= History of Milan =

Historical affiliations

Celtic tribe belonging to the Insubres group 590–222 BC
Roman Republic 222–27 BC
Roman Empire 27 BC–AD 395
Western Roman Empire 395–476
Kingdom of Italy 476–493
Ostrogothic Kingdom 493–553
Eastern Roman Empire 553–569
Lombard Kingdom 569–774
Carolingian Empire 774–781
Regnum Italiae 781–1014
Holy Roman Empire 1014–1114
Free Commune 1114–1259
Lordship of Milan 1259–1395
Duchy of Milan 1395–1447
Golden Ambrosian Republic 1447–1450
Duchy of Milan 1450–1796
Transpadane Republic 1796-1797
Cisalpine Republic 1797–1802
Italian Republic 1802–1805
Kingdom of Italy 1805–1814
Kingdom of Lombardy–Venetia 1815–1859
Kingdom of Sardinia 1859–1861
Kingdom of Italy 1861–1943
Italian Social Republic 1943–1945
Kingdom of Italy 1945–1946
Italian Republic 1946–present

Milan is an ancient city in northern Italy first settled under the name Medhelanon in about 590 BC by a Celtic tribe belonging to the Insubres group and belonging to the Golasecca culture. It was conquered by the ancient Romans in 222 BC, who Latinized the name of the city into Mediolanum. The city's role as a major political centre dates back to the late antiquity, when it served as the capital of the Western Roman Empire.

From the 12th century until the 16th century, Milan was one of the largest European cities and a major trade and commercial centre, as the capital of the Duchy of Milan, one of the greatest political, artistic and fashion forces in the Renaissance. Having become one of the main centres of the Italian Enlightenment during the early modern period, it then became one of the most active centres during the Restoration, until its entry into the unified Kingdom of Italy. From the 20th century onwards Milan became the industrial and financial capital of Italy, one of the economic capitals of Europe and a global financial centre.

== Toponymy ==
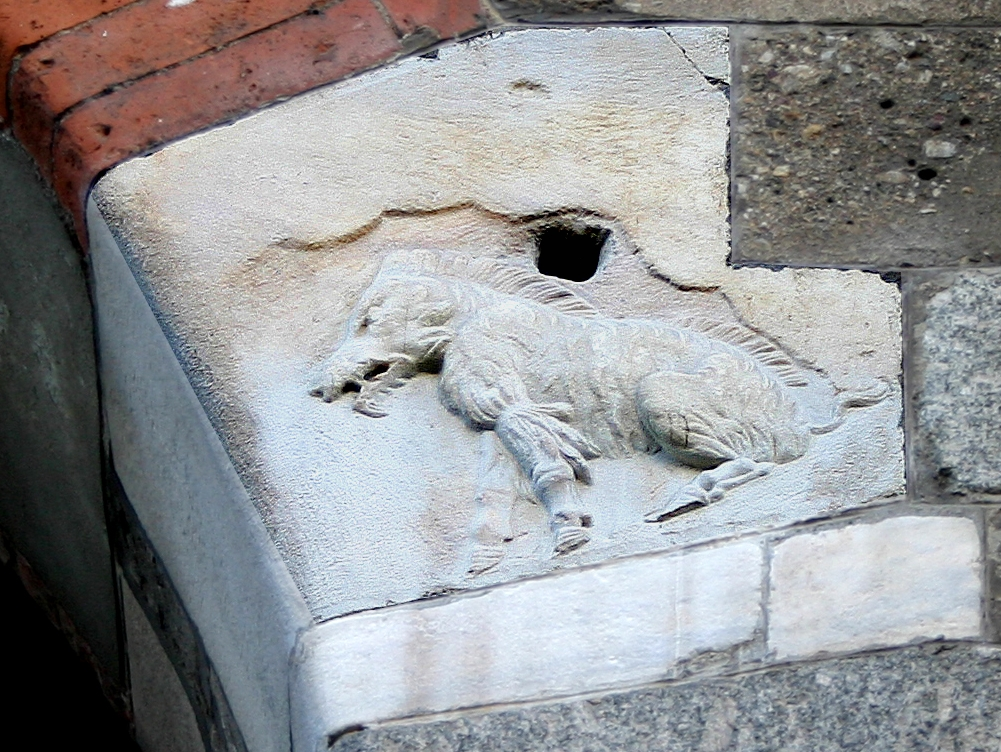
Bas-relief sculpted on the Palazzo della Ragione of the scrofa semilanuta ("half-woolly sow") from which, according to tradition, the city's toponym derives

Milan was founded with the Celtic name of Medhelanon, later Latinized by the ancient Romans into Mediolanum. In Celtic language medhe- meant "middle, centre" and the name element -lanon is the Celtic equivalent of Latin -planum "plain", meant "(settlement) in the midst of the plain", or of "place between watercourses" (Celtic medhe = "in the middle, central"; land or lan = "land"), given the presence of the Olona, Lambro, Seveso rivers and the Nirone and Pudiga streams.

The dh sound, which has disappeared from the modern Milanese dialect, was instead present in the ancient local idiom once spoken in Milan. It is found, among others, as well as in Medhelanon, in the ancient Milanese words doradha ("golden"), crudho ("abrupt person"), mudha ("change") and ornadha ("ornate"). In Milanese dialect, the oldest name of which documented traces have been found is Miran.

The Latin name Mediolanum comes from the Latin words medio (in the middle) and planus (plain). However, some scholars believe that lanum comes from the Celtic root lan, meaning an enclosure or demarcated territory (source of the Welsh word llan, meaning "a sanctuary or church", ultimately cognate to English/German Land) in which Celtic communities used to build shrines.

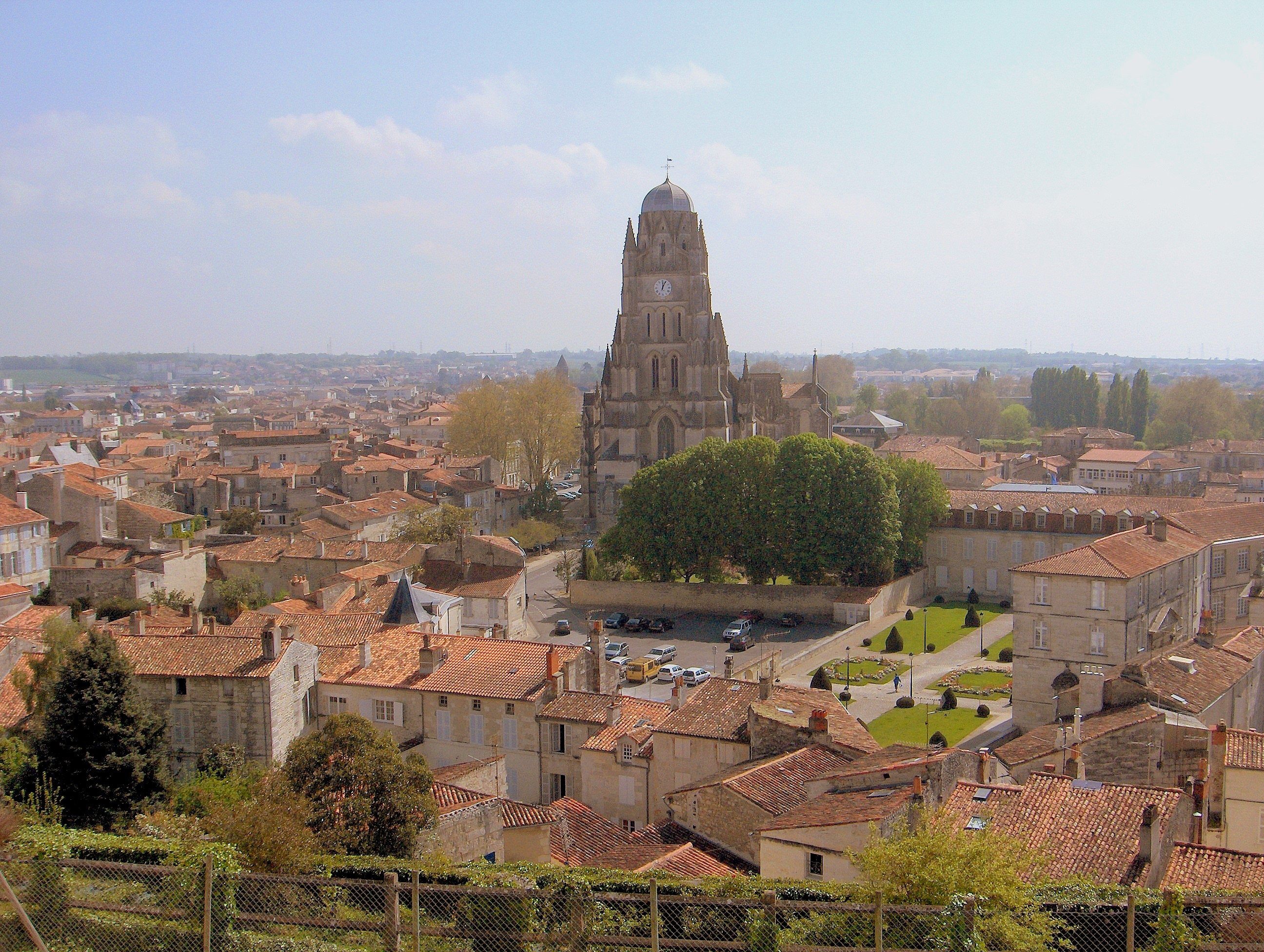
Panorama of Saintes, a French municipality in the Charente-Maritime department, known in Roman times as Mediolanum Santonum

Hence Mediolanum could signify the central town or sanctuary of a Celtic tribe. Indeed, about sixty Gallo-Roman sites in France bore the name "Mediolanum", for example: Saintes (Mediolanum Santonum) and Évreux (Mediolanum Aulercorum). In addition, another theory links the name to the scrofa semilanuta ("half-woolly sow") an ancient emblem of the city, fancifully accounted for in Andrea Alciato's Emblemata (1584), beneath a woodcut of the first raising of the city walls, where a boar is seen lifted from the excavation, and the etymology of Mediolanum given as "half-wool", explained in Latin and in French.

According to this theory, the foundation of Milan is credited to two Celtic peoples, the Bituriges and the Aedui, having as their emblems a ram and a boar; therefore "The city's symbol is a wool-bearing boar, an animal of double form, here with sharp bristles, there with sleek wool." Alciato credits Ambrose for his account.

== Place of foundation ==
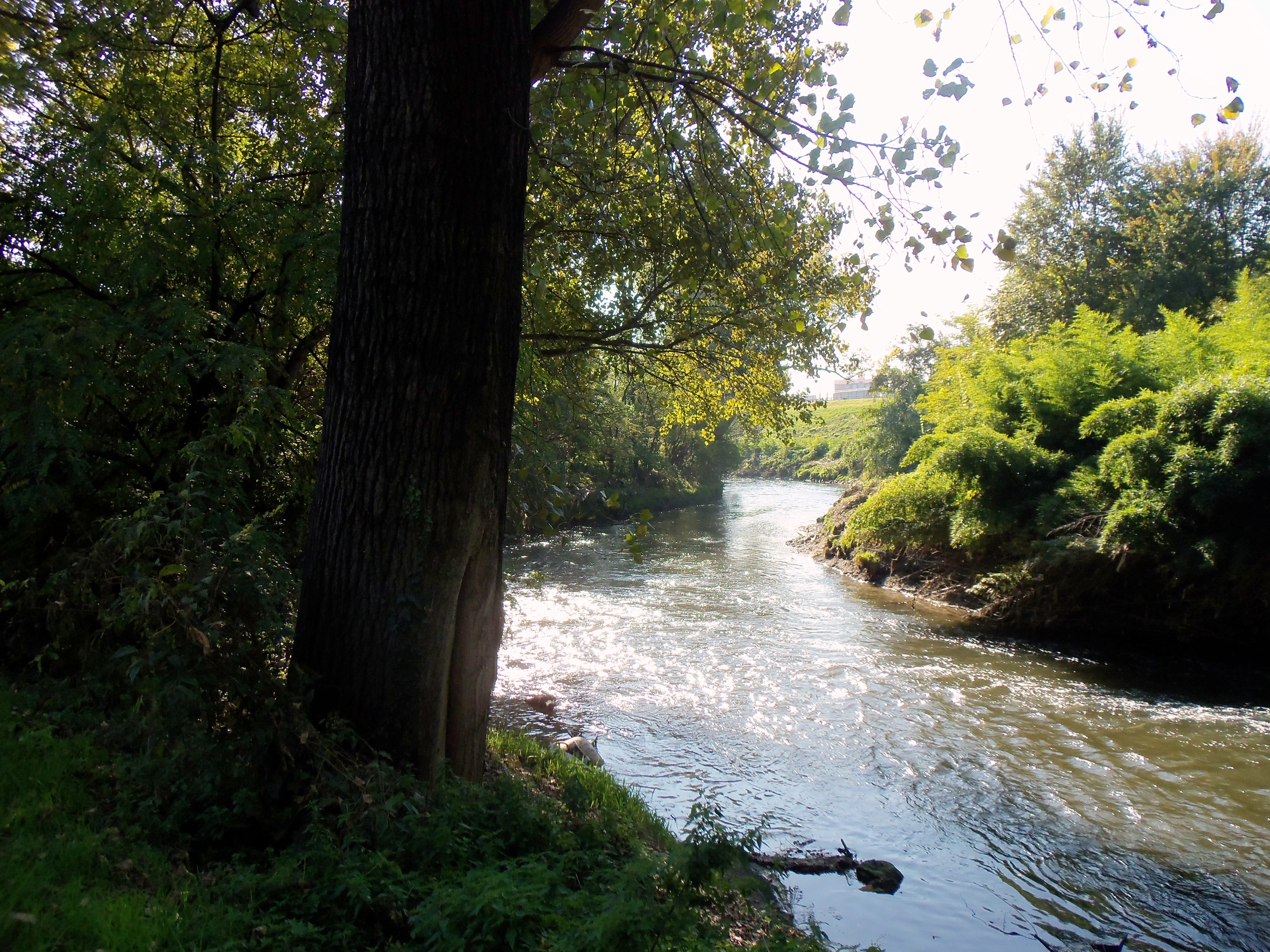
Lambro river in Milan

Three hypotheses are considered regarding the location choice of the territory of Milan, which are based on the etymology of the name Medhelanon and on the archaeological investigations carried out in modern times on the Milanese territory:

- the choice of place may have been dictated by the presence of the "line of springs" where there is a meeting, underground, between geological layers with different permeability, a type of terrain that allows deep waters to spontaneously resurface on the surface. This could mean that Medhelanon was born on a spit of land that originally overlooked a swamp, and therefore in a well-defensible place;
- the presence of five watercourses in its surroundings may have been decisive: the Seveso and the Lambro to the east, and the Pudiga, the Nirone and the Olona to the west.
- finally, Medhelanon may have been founded near an important and pre-existing Celtic sanctuary which was located near the modern Piazza della Scala.

== Celtic era ==
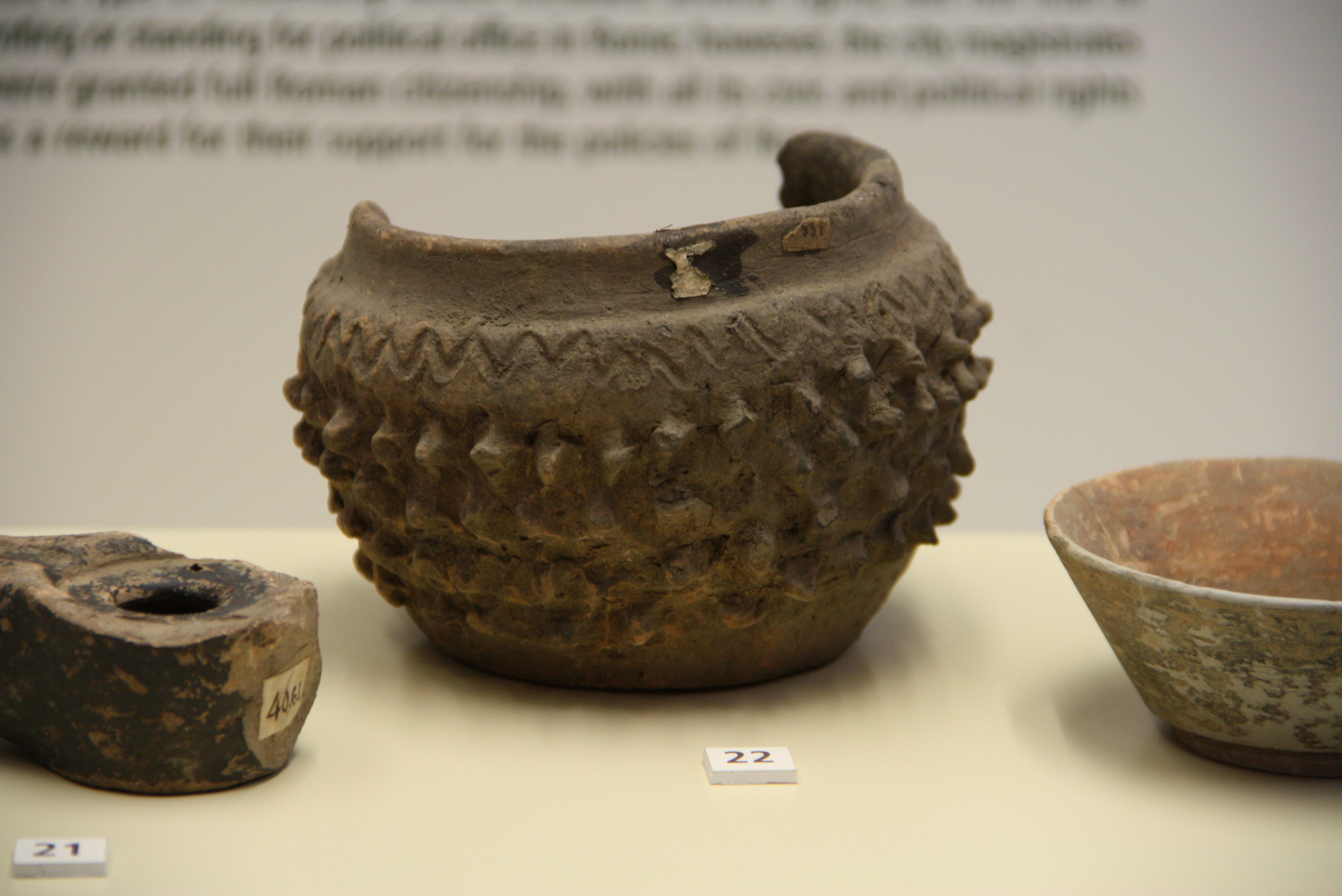
Celtic finds dating back to the period preceding the Roman conquest (3rd-2nd century BC), which is preserved in the Civic Archaeological Museum of Milan

Around 590 BC a Celtic tribe belonging to the Insubres group and belonging to the Golasecca culture settled the city under the name Medhelanon. According to Titus Livy's comments, the city was founded around 600 B.C. by Belloveso, chief of the Insubres. Legend has it that Belloveso found a mythological animal known as the scrofa semilanuta (in Italian: "half-wooly boar") which became the ancient emblem of the city of Milan (from semi-lanuta or medio-lanum). Several ancient sources (including Sidonius Apollinaris, Datius, and, more recently, Andrea Alciato) have argued that the scrofa semilanuta is connected to the etymology of the ancient name of Milan, "Mediolanum", and this is still occasionally mentioned in modern sources, although this interpretation has long been dismissed by scholars. Nonetheless, wool production became a key industry in this area, as recorded during the early Middle Ages.

Medhelanon, in particular, was developed around a sanctuary, which was the oldest area of the village. The sanctuary, which consisted of a wooded area in the shape of an ellipse with a central clearing, was aligned according to precise astronomical points. For this reason, it was used for religious gatherings, especially in particular celebratory moments. The sanctuary of Medhelanon was an ellipse with axes of 443 m (1,453 ft) and 323 m (1,060 ft) located near Piazza della Scala. The urban planning profile was based on these early paths, and on the shape of the sanctuary, reached, in some cases, up to the 19th century and even beyond. For example, the route of the modern Corso Vittorio Emanuele, Piazza del Duomo, Piazza Cordusio and Via Broletto, which is curvilinear, could correspond to the south side of the ellipse of the ancient sanctuary of Medhelanon.

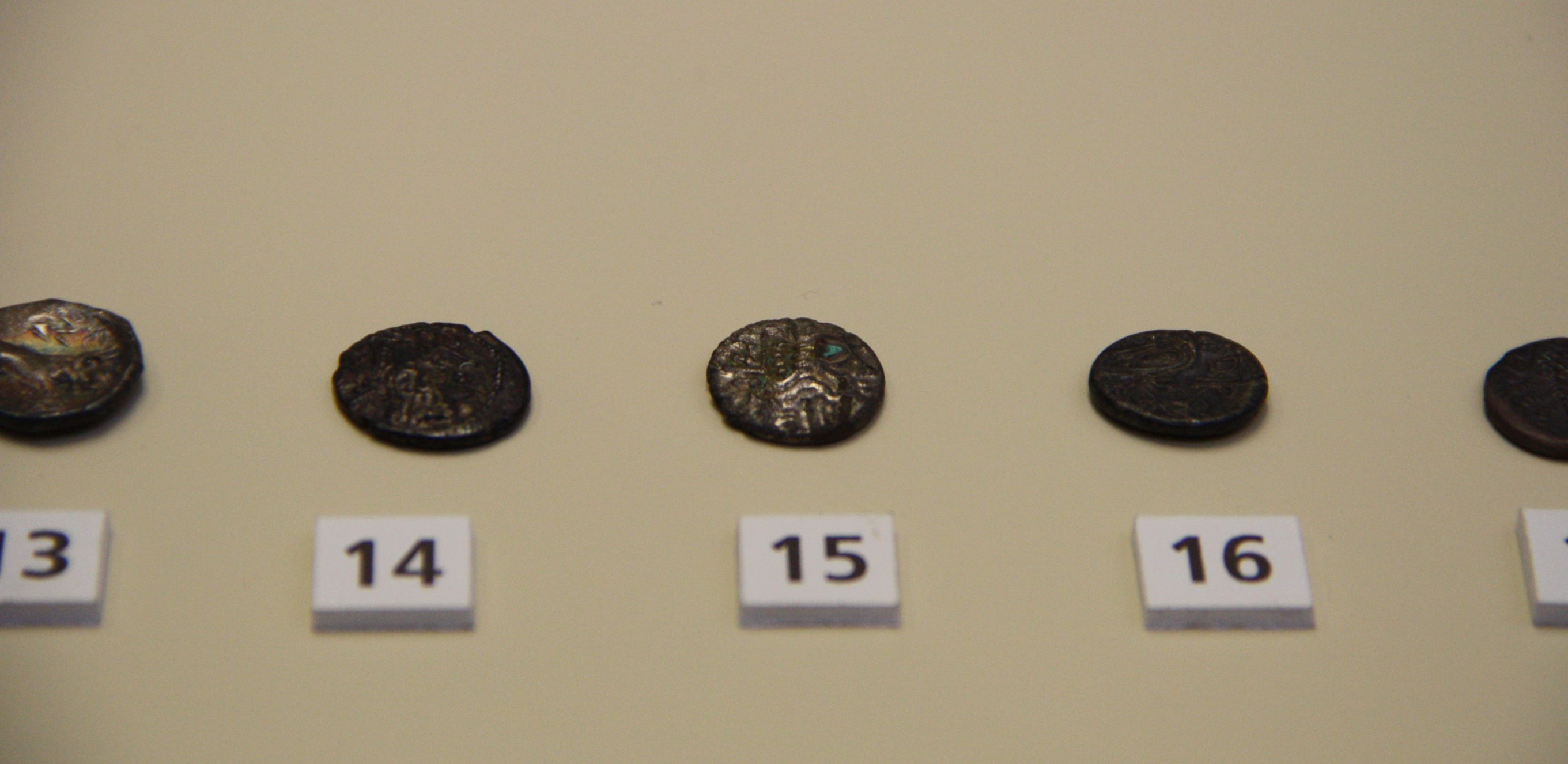
Celtic silver drachmas, minted in Milan in imitation of the Ancient drachmas of Massalia (Marseille), dating back to the period preceding the Roman conquest (2nd-1st century BC), which are preserved in the Civic Archaeological Museum of Milan. Some have writings in Etruscan characters

The Celtic sanctuaries, and that of Medhelanon was not an exception, were equipped with a moat, which had the purpose of sacredly defining the urban space, distinguishing the "inside" and the "outside", and at the same time had to protect it from the flowing waters in the territory. One axis of the Medhelanon sanctuary was aligned towards the heliacal rising of Antares, while the other towards the heliacal rising of Capella. The latter coincided with a Celtic spring festival celebrated on 24 March, while the heliacal rising of Antares corresponded with 11 November, which opened and closed the Celtic year and which coincided with the point where the Sun rose on the winter solstice. About two centuries after the creation of the Celtic sanctuary, the first residential settlements began to be built around it. Medhelanon then transformed from a simple religious center to an urban and then military centre, thus becoming a real village.

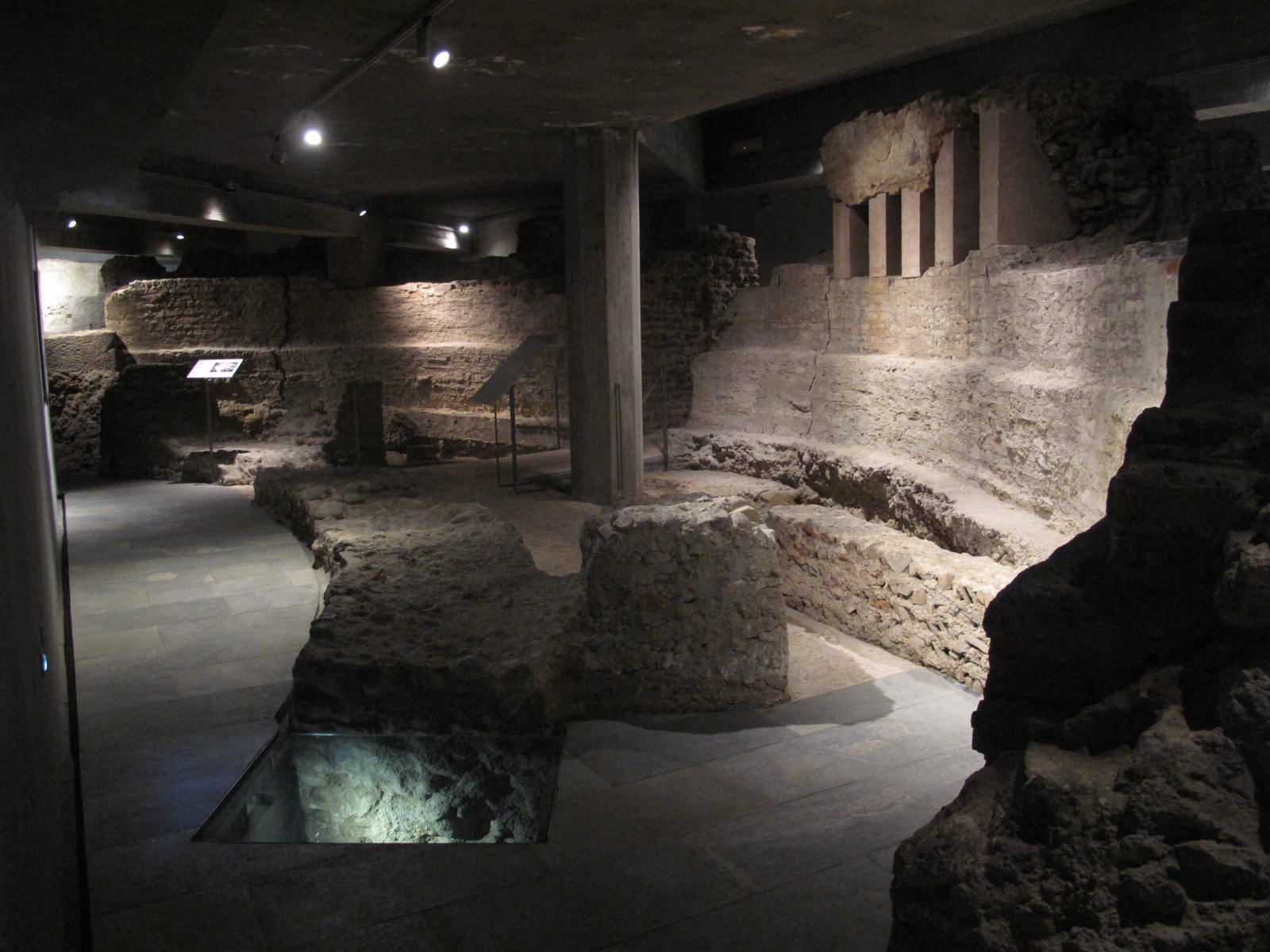
The ruins of the basilica of Santa Tecla, which are located under the Milan Cathedral. Among them, remains of a temple were found, perhaps of the Celtic one dedicated to Belisama or of the subsequent Roman temple dedicated to Minerva

The first homes were built just south of the Celtic sanctuary, near the modern Royal Palace of Milan. Subsequently, with the growth of the town centre, other important buildings for the Medhelanon community were built. First, a temple dedicated to the goddess Belisama was built, which was located near the modern Milan Cathedral. Then, near the modern Via Moneta, which is located near today's Piazza San Sepolcro, a fortified building with military functions was built which was surrounded by a defensive moat.

At the current Biblioteca Ambrosiana, in Piazza San Sepolcro, archaeological excavations have revealed the presence, under the stone floor dating back to the 1st century AD. of the Roman forum of Milan, of a neighborhood of wooden houses dating back to the Celtic settlement of the 5th century BC. Other important findings attributable to the Celtic era were found along the south-west side of the Royal Palace, where, five meters below the modern road surface, remains of houses and a furnace were discovered which date back to a period between 5th and 4th centuries BC.

Among the remains of the Basilica of Santa Tecla, which are located under the Milen Cathedral, there is what remains of a square-based building with a side of 17 m (56 ft) perhaps associated with the temple dedicated to Belisama, or with a subsequent Roman temple dedicated to Minerva. The moat of the fortified military building, which dated back to the 4th century BC, was found in Via Moneta.

== Roman times ==
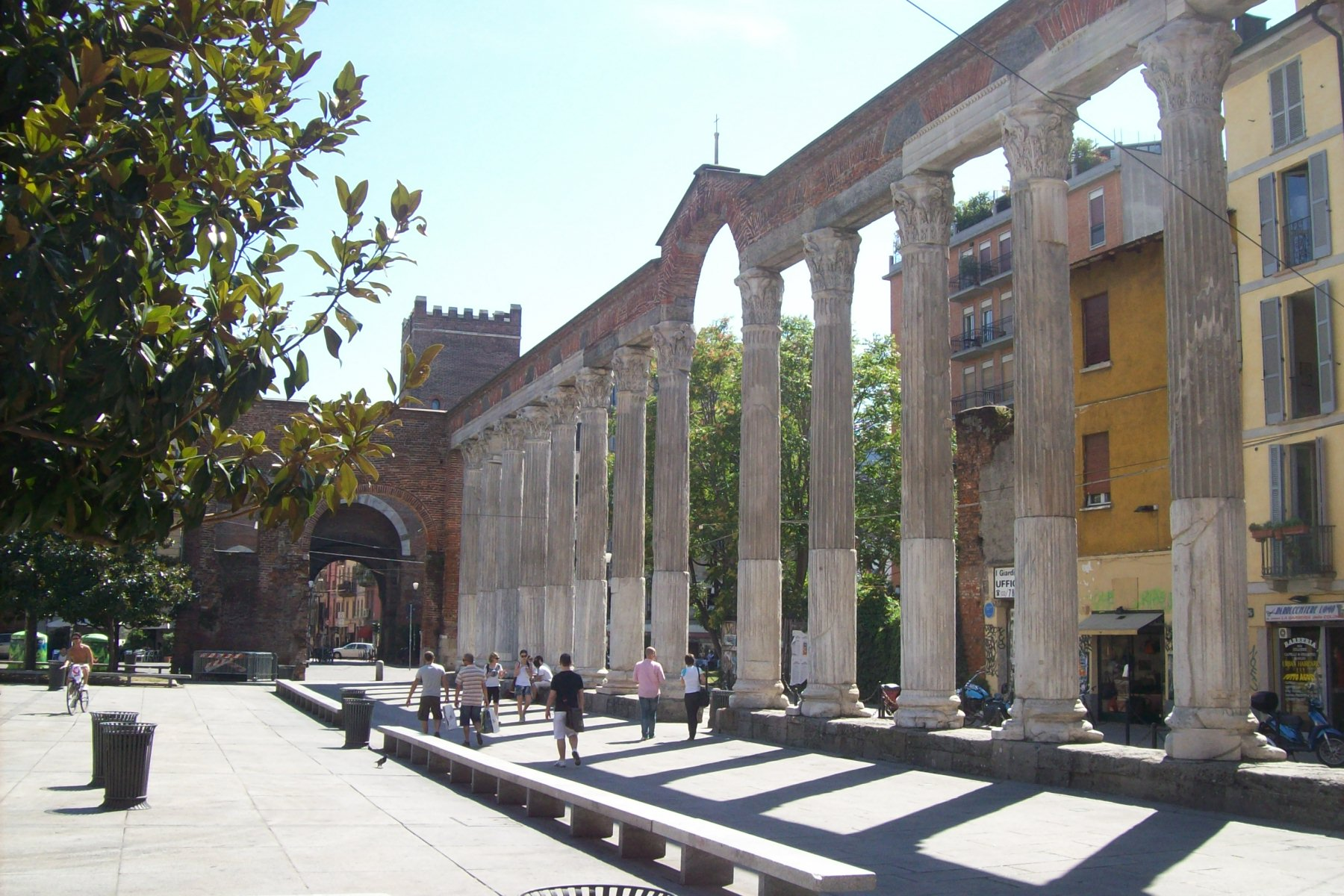
Roman ruins in Milan: the Columns of San Lorenzo

During the Roman Republic, the Romans, led by consul Gnaeus Cornelius Scipio Calvus, fought the Insubres and captured the settlement in 222 BC. The chief of the Insubres then submitted to Rome, giving the Romans control of the settlement. The Romans eventually conquered the entirety of the region, calling the new province "Cisalpine Gaul" (Latin: Gallia Cisalpina)—"Gaul this side of the Alps"—and may have given the city its Latinized name of Mediolanum: in Gaulish *medio- meant "middle, centre" and the name element -lanon is the Celtic equivalent of Latin -planum "plain", thus *Mediolanon (Latinized as Mediolānum) meant "(settlement) in the midst of the plain". Mediolanum became the most important center of Cisalpine Gaul and, in the wake of economic development, in 49 BC, was elevated, within the Lex Roscia, to the status of municipium.

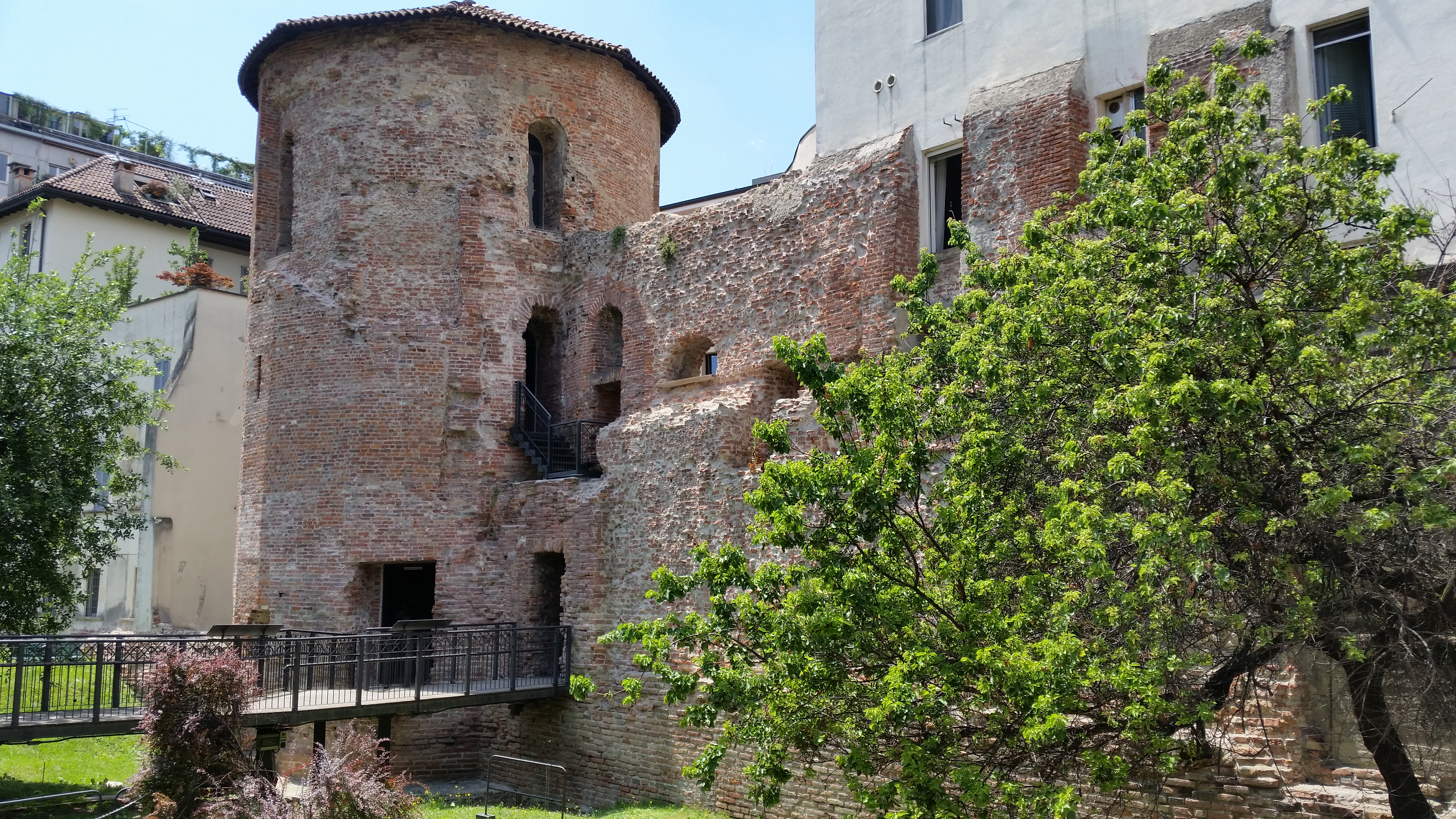
Remains of the Roman walls of Milan located inside the Civic Archaeological Museum of Milan

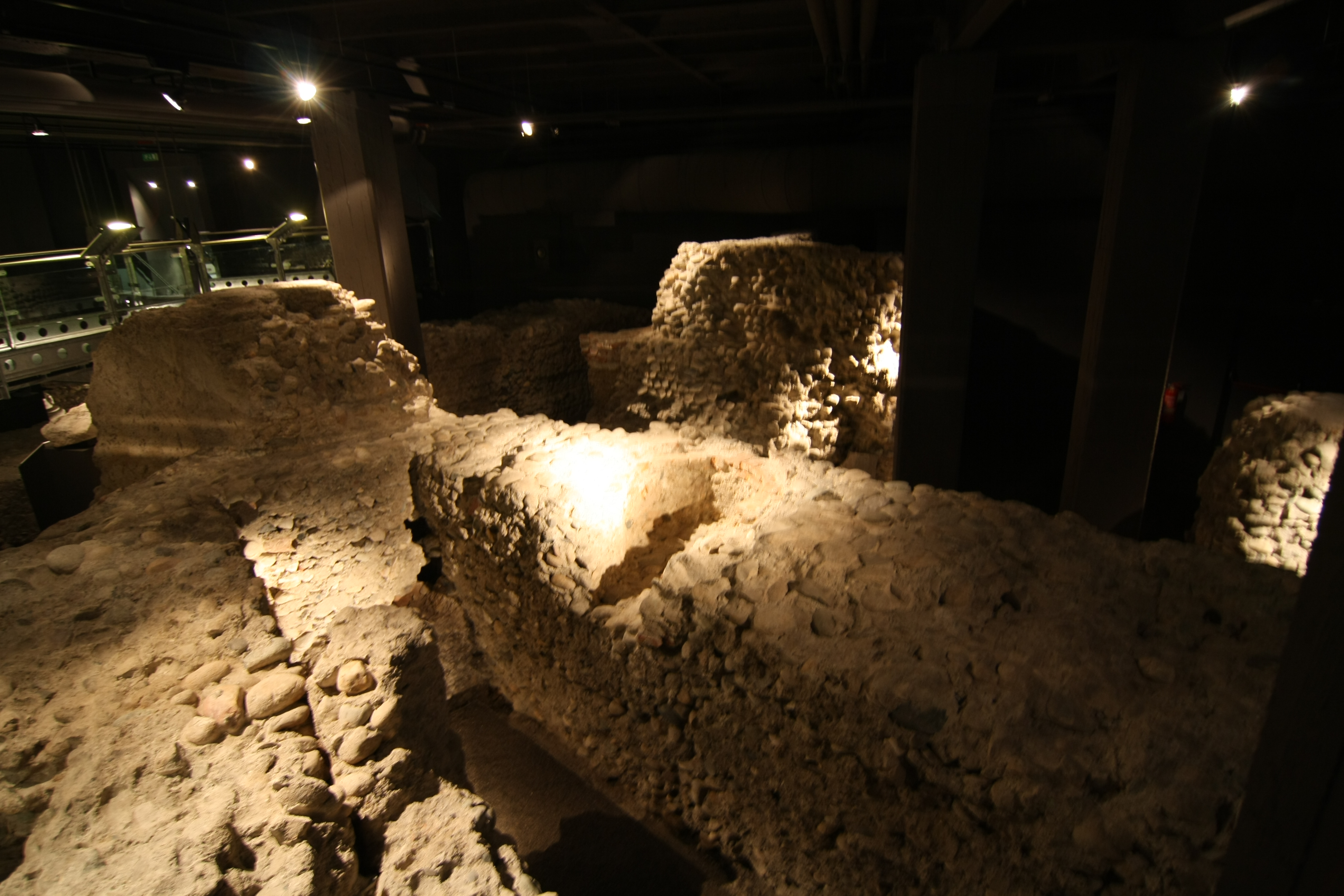
Remains of the Roman theater of Milan, which can be visited in the museum located in the basement of Palazzo Turati at the city's chamber of commerce

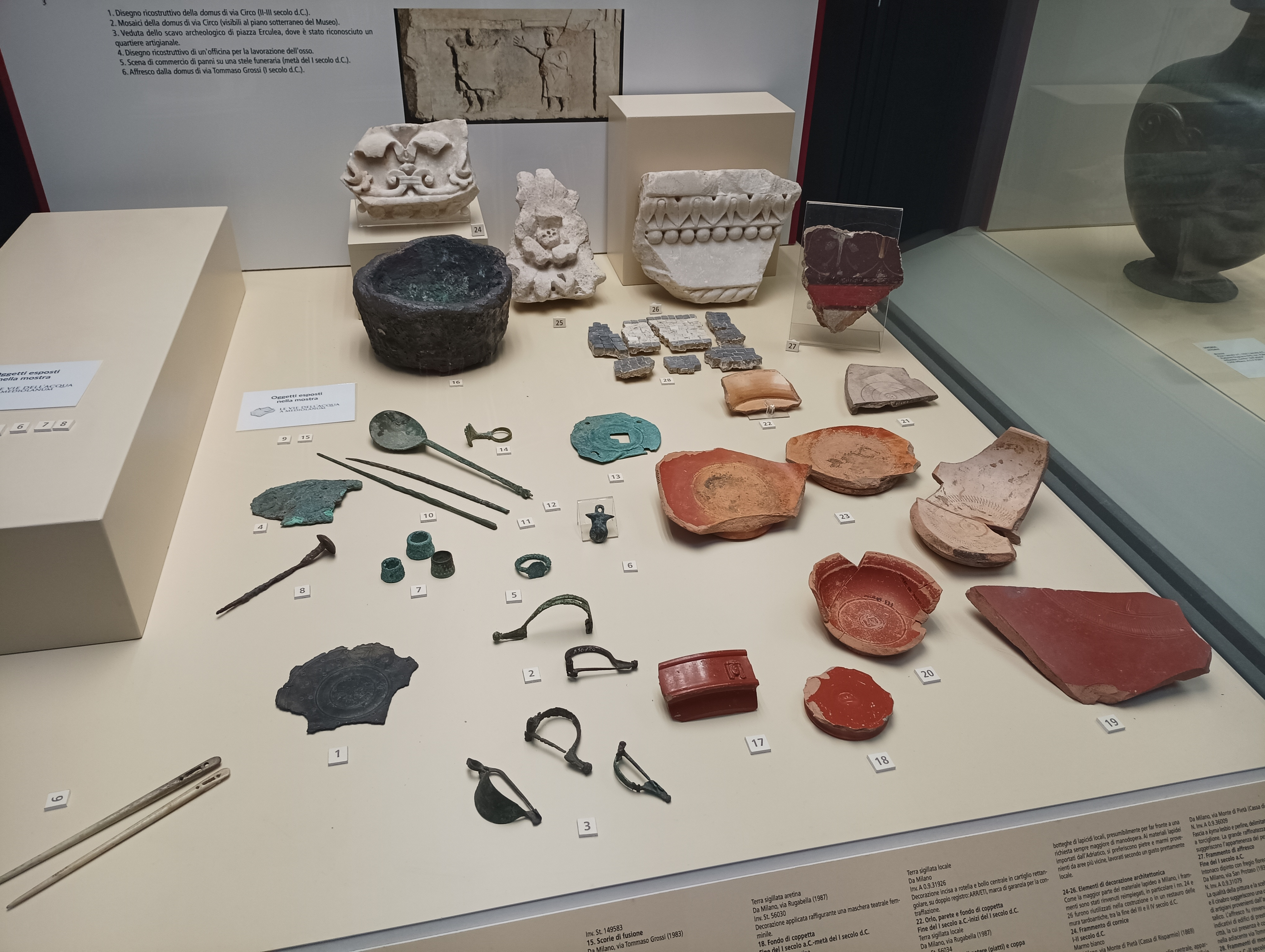
Ancient Roman pottery in the Civic Archaeological Museum of Milan

The ancient Celtic settlement was, from a topographic point of view, superimposed and replaced by the Roman one. The Roman city was then gradually superimposed and replaced by the medieval one. The urban center of Milan has therefore grown constantly and rapidly, until modern times, around the first Celtic nucleus. The original Celtic toponym Medhelanon then changed, as evidenced by a graffiti in Celtic language present on a section of the Roman walls of Milan which dates back to a period following the Roman conquest of the Celtic village, in Mesiolano. Mediolanum was important for its location as a hub in the road network of northern Italy. Polybius describes the country as abounding in wine, and every kind of grain, and in fine wool. Herds of swine, both for public and private supply, were bred in its forests, and the people were well known for their generosity.

Ruins of the Emperor's palace in Milan located in Via Gorani. Here Constantine and Licinius issued the Edict of Milan.

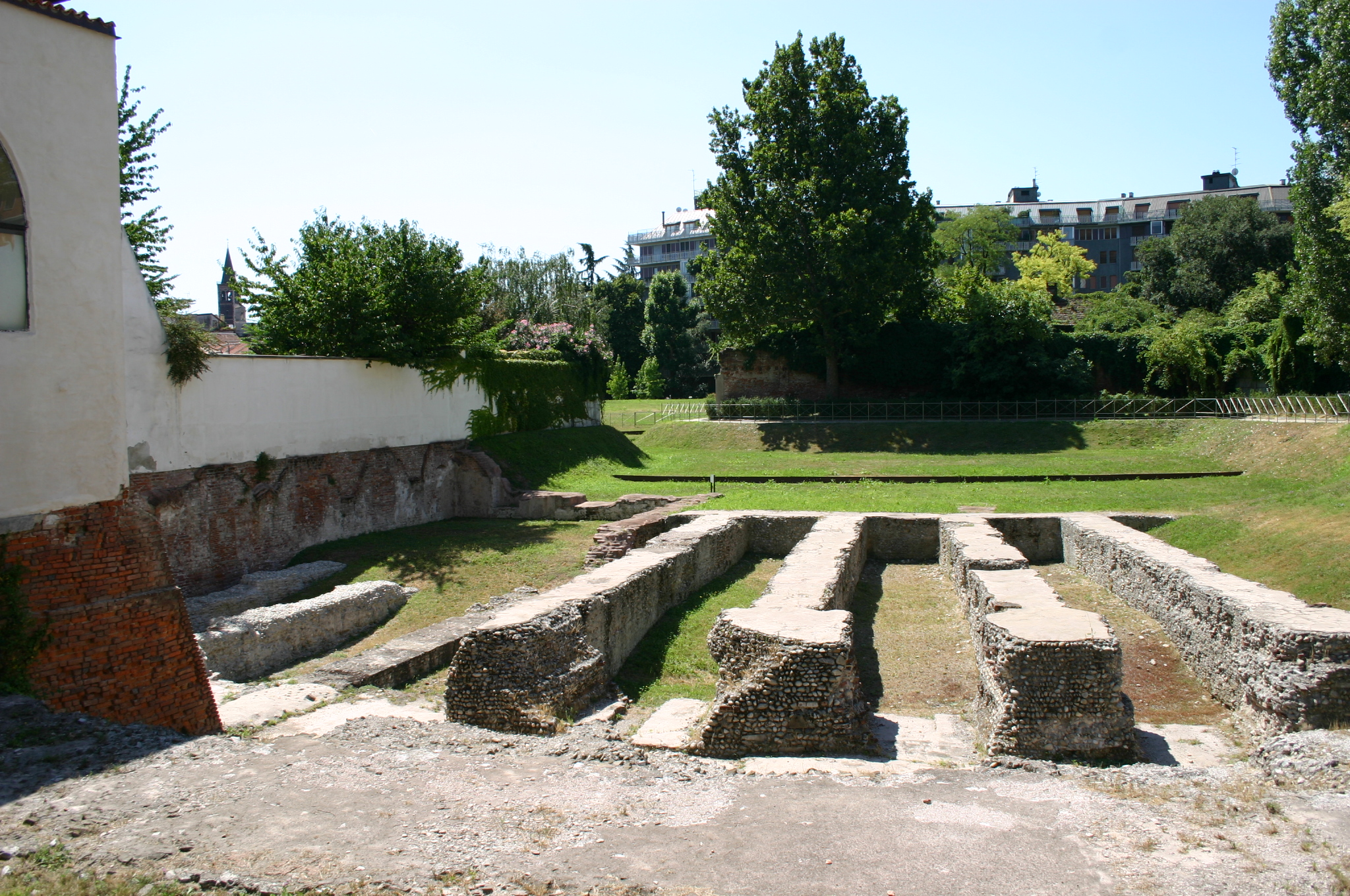
The remains of the Roman amphitheater of Milan, which are located in the courtyard of the Antiquarium of Milan

During the Augustan age Mediolanum was famous for its schools; it possessed a theatre and an amphitheatre (129.5 X 109.3 m), the third largest in Roman Italy after the Colosseum in Rome and the vast amphitheatre in Capua. A large stone wall encircled the city in Caesar's time, and later was expanded in the late third century AD, by Maximian. Mediolanum was made the seat of the prefect of Liguria (Praefectus Liguriae) by Hadrian, and Constantine made it the seat of the vicar of Italy (Vicarius Italiae). In the third century Mediolanum possessed a mint, a horreum and imperial mausoleum. In 259, Roman legions under the command of Emperor Gallienus soundly defeated the Alemanni in the Battle of Mediolanum. In 286, the Roman Emperor Diocletian moved the capital of the Western Roman Empire from Rome to Mediolanum. Diocletian himself chose to reside at Nicomedia in the Eastern Empire, leaving his colleague Maximian at Milan.

Maximian built several gigantic monuments: the large circus (470 × 85 metres), the thermae or Baths of Hercules, a large complex of imperial palaces and other services and buildings of which few visible traces remain. Maximian increased the city area to 375 acres by surrounding it with a new, larger stone wall (about 4.5 km long) with many 24-sided towers. The monumental area had twin towers; the one included later in the construction of the convent of San Maurizio Maggiore remains 16.6 m high.

In Mediolanum there was no need for aqueducts, given that the water was abundant and easily accessible: it emerged from the ground from springs and flowed nearby in rivers and streams, and this fully responded to the needs of the city's daily life. Given that over the centuries Mediolanum had grown and needed new water for the most varied uses (for artisans as well as for public, domestic and defensive uses) the ancient Romans the Seveso river, the Nirone river and the Olona river, which flowed just outside the town centre, towards the city, flowing into the moat of the Roman walls of Mediolanum.

It was from Mediolanum that the Emperor Constantine issued what is now known as the Edict of Milan in AD 313, granting tolerance to all religions within the Empire, thus paving the way for Christianity to become the dominant religion of the Empire. Constantine was in Mediolanum to celebrate the wedding of his sister to the Eastern Emperor, Licinius. There were Christian communities in Mediolanum, which contributed its share of martyrs during the persecutions, but the first bishop of Milan who has a firm historical presence is Merocles, who was at the Council of Rome of 313. In the mid-fourth century, the Arian controversy divided the Christians of Mediolanum; Constantius supported Arian bishops and at times there were rival bishops. Auxentius of Milan (died 374) was a respected Arian theologian.

At the time of the bishop St. Ambrose (bishop 374–397), who quelled the Arians, and emperor Theodosius I, Mediolanum reached the height of its ancient power. The city also possessed a number of basilicas, added in the late fourth century AD. These are San Simpliciano, San Nazaro, San Lorenzo and the chapel of San Vittore, located in the basilica of Sant'Ambrogio. In general, the Late Empire encouraged the development of the applied arts in Mediolanum, with ivory and silver work being common in public building projects. In the crypt of the Duomo are ruins of the ancient church of Saint Tecla and the baptistry where St. Augustine of Hippo was baptized.

In 402, the Visigoths besieged the city and the Emperor Honorius moved the Imperial residence to Ravenna. In 452, Attila besieged the city, but the real break with the city's Imperial past came in 539, during the Gothic War, when Uraias (a nephew of Witiges, formerly King of the Italian Ostrogoths) carried out attacks in Milan, with losses, according to Procopius, being about 300,000 men. The Lombards took Ticinum as their capital in 572 (renaming it Papia – the modern Pavia), and left early-medieval Milan to the governance of its archbishops.

During the Roman imperial era and the Lombard Kingdom, the civic and social center of Milan was the Cordusio area. In the Celtic era, in correspondence with the modern Piazza Cordusio, the castrum, or rather the Roman military camp (placed there to attack the Celtic center of Medhelanon) which then gave rise to Mediolanum, while in the Lombard era there was a presence in the Cordusio the palace of the Lombard duke, was located near the modern square of the same name, hence the origin of this toponym: from De curte ducis (or Curia ducis, i.e. the "court of the Lombard dukes"), to Cortedoxi, then Corduce and finally Corduso or Cordusio. The Cordusio began to lose this primacy after the year 1000 when it was joined, as a reference area, by other districts of Milan.

== Middle Ages ==
The Duchy of Milan in its period of greatest expansion, between the end of the 14th century and the beginning of the 15th century

In 539, the Ostrogoths conquered and destroyed Milan during the Gothic War against Byzantine Emperor Justinian I. In the summer of 569, a Germanic tribe, the Lombards (from which the name of the Italian region Lombardy derives), conquered Milan, overpowering the small Byzantine army left for its defense. Some Roman structures remained in use in Milan under Lombard rule, but the city was eclipsed by the nearby Lombard capital of Pavia during the next two centuries.

Milan surrendered to Charlemagne and the Franks in 774. The aristocracy and majority of the clergy had taken refuge in Genoa. In 774, when Charlemagne took the title of "King of the Lombards", he established his imperial capital of Aachen in what is today Germany. Before then the Germanic kingdoms had frequently conquered each other, but none had adopted the title of King of another people. The Iron Crown of Lombardy (i.e. referring to Charlemagne's kingdom and not to the Italian region), which was worn by Charlemagne, dates from this period. Milan's domination under the Franks led by Charlemagne did nothing to improve the city's fortune, and the city's impoverishment increased and Milan became a county seat.

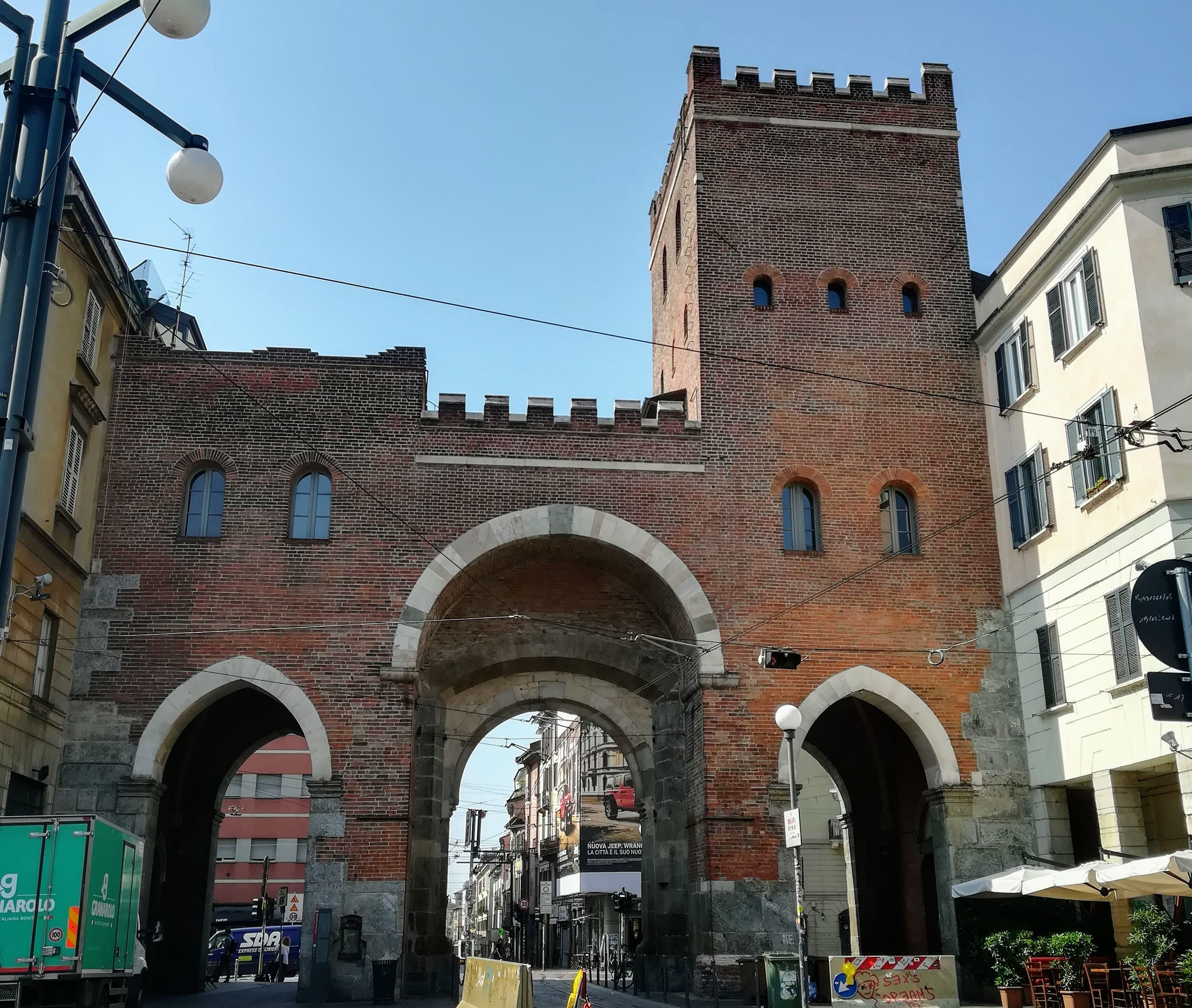
The Medieval Porta Ticinese (12th century), one of the remaining gates from the medieval walls of Milan

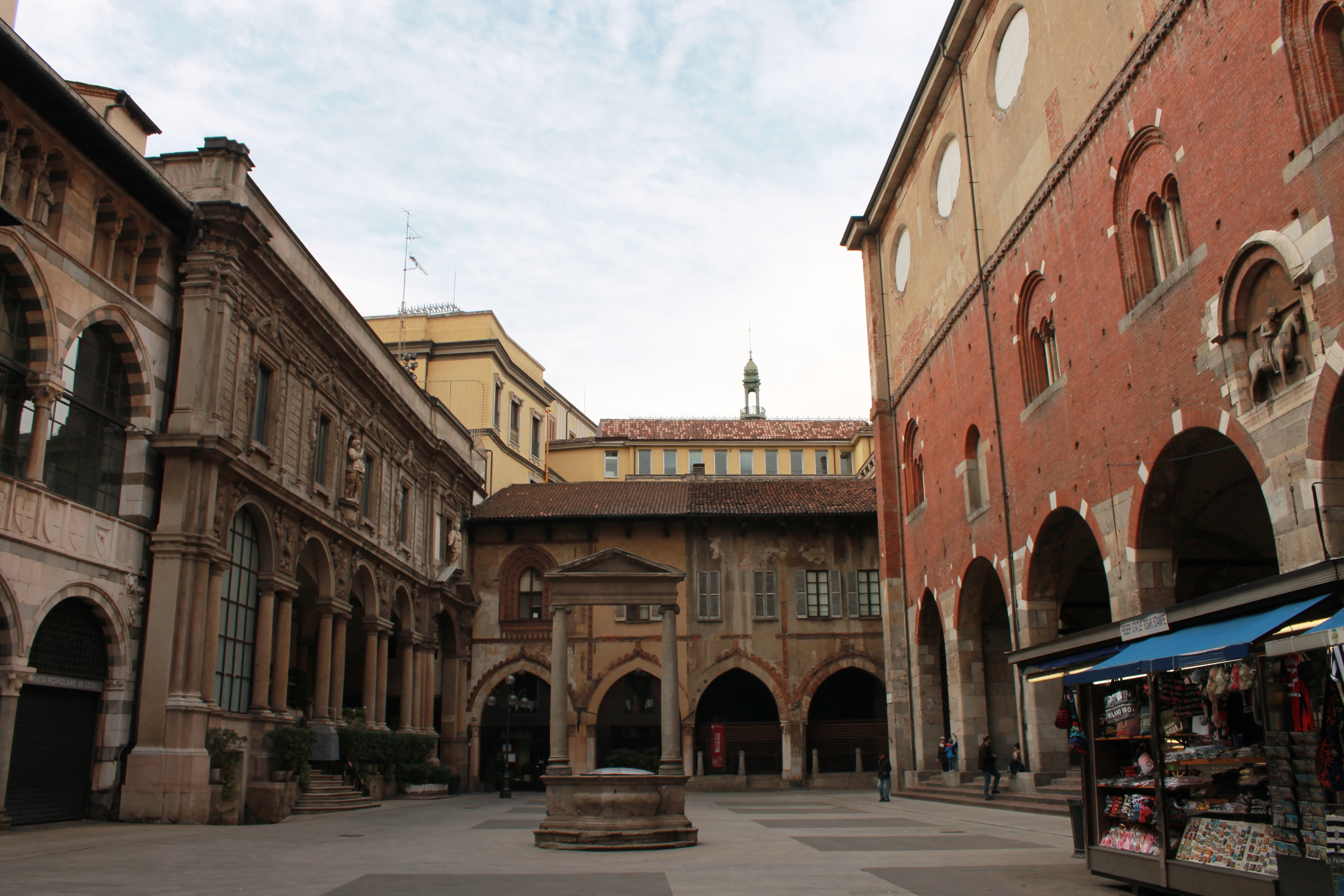
Piazza Mercanti used to be the heart of the city in the Middle Ages

The 11th century saw a reaction against the control of the Holy Roman Emperors. The city-state was born, an expression of the new political power of the city and its will to fight against feudal overlords. Milan was no exception. It did not take long, however, for the city states to begin fighting each other to try to limit neighbouring powers. The Milanese destroyed Lodi and continuously warred with Pavia, Cremona and Como, who in turn asked Frederick I Barbarossa for help. In a sally, they captured Empress Beatrice and forced her to ride a donkey backwards out through the city. These acts brought the destruction of much of Milan in 1162. A fire destroyed the storehouses containing the entire food supply, and within just a few days Milan was forced to surrender.

A period of peace followed and Milan prospered as a centre of trade due to its geographical position. During this time, the city was considered one of the largest European cities. As a result of the independence that the Lombard cities gained in the Peace of Constance in 1183, Milan returned to the commune form of local government first established in the 11th century. In 1208 Rambertino Buvalelli served a term as podestà of the city, in 1242 Luca Grimaldi, and in 1282 Luchetto Gattilusio. The position was a dangerous one: in 1252 Milanese heretics assassinated the Church's Inquisitor, later known as Saint Peter Martyr, at a ford in the nearby contado; the killers bribed their way to freedom, and in the ensuing riot the podestà was almost lynched. In 1256 the archbishop and leading nobles were expelled from the city. In 1259 Martino della Torre was elected Capitano del Popolo by members of the guilds; he took the city by force, expelled his enemies, and ruled by autocratic powers, paving streets, digging canals, and taxing the countryside. He also brought the Milanese treasury to collapse; the use of often reckless mercenary units further angered the population, granting an increasing support for the della Torre's traditional enemies, the Visconti. The most important industries in this period were armaments and wool production, a whole catalogue of activities and trades is given in Bonvesin della Riva's "de Magnalibus Urbis Mediolani".

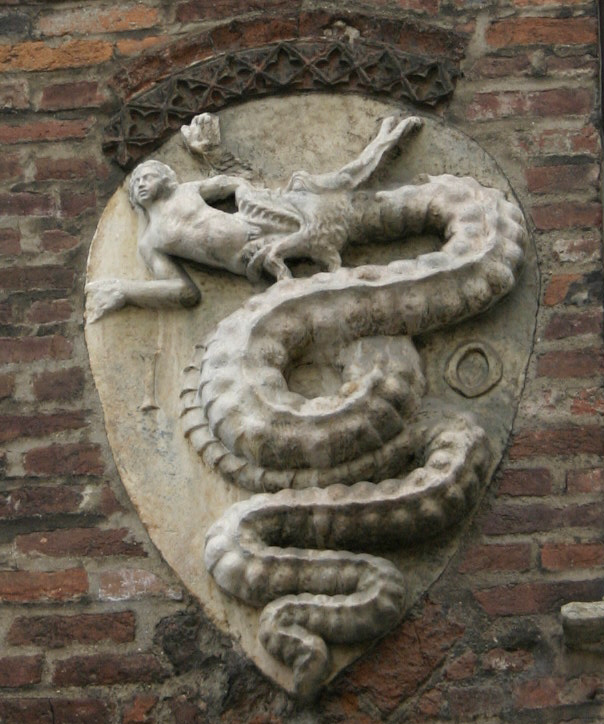
A historic symbol of the city, the Biscione: the coat of arms of the House of Visconti, from the Archbishops' palace in Piazza Duomo

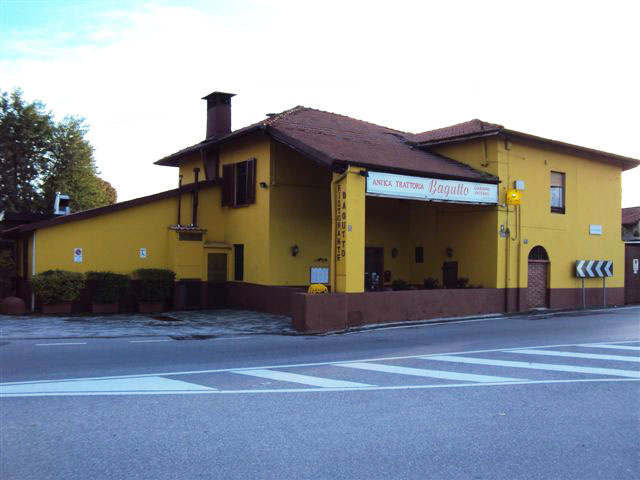
The Antica trattoria Bagutto in Milan, the oldest restaurant in Italy and the second in Europe.

On 22 July 1262, Ottone Visconti was made archbishop of Milan by Pope Urban IV, against the candidacy of Raimondo della Torre, Bishop of Como. The latter started to publicise allegations that the Visconti had ties to the heretic Cathars and charged them with high treason. The Visconti, who accused the della Torre of the same crimes, were then banned from Milan and their properties confiscated. The ensuing civil war caused more damage to Milan's population and economy, lasting for more than a decade. Ottone Visconti unsuccessfully led a group of exiles against the city in 1263, but after years of escalating violence on all sides, in the Battle of Desio (1277) he won the city for his family. The Visconti succeeded in ousting the della Torre permanently, and proceeded to rule Milan and its possessions until the 15th century. Milan is home to the oldest restaurant in Italy and the second in Europe, the Antica trattoria Bagutto, which has existed since at least 1284.

Much of the prior history of Milan was the tale of the struggle between two political factions: the Guelphs and the Ghibellines. Most of the time the Guelphs were successful in the city of Milan. Eventually, however, the Visconti family were able to seize power (signoria) in Milan, based on their "Ghibelline" friendship with the Holy Roman Emperors. In 1395, one of these emperors, Wenceslaus IV of Bohemia (1378–1400), raised Milan to the dignity of a duchy. Also in 1395, Gian Galeazzo Visconti became Duke of Milan. The Ghibelline Visconti family was to retain power in Milan for a century and a half from the early 14th century until the middle of the 15th century.

The episcopal complex of Milan superimposed on the modern Piazza del Duomo. The episcopal complex, which was demolished to allow the construction of the modern Milan Cathedral (Duomo di Milano), consisted of the basilica of Santa Tecla, the baptistery of San Giovanni alle Fonti, the cathedral of Santa Maria Maggiore and the baptistery of Santo Stefano alle Fonti

In the place where the modern Milan Cathedral stands, there was once the ancient cathedral of Santa Maria Maggiore (original early Christian names basilica vetus or basilica minor), established in 313, and the basilica of Santa Tecla (original early Christian names basilica maior or basilica nova), established in 350, which together formed the episcopal complex with the baptistery of San Giovanni alle Fonti and the baptistery of Santo Stefano alle Fonti. The presence of two very close basilicas was in fact common in Northern Italy during the Constantinian age and could be found, in particular, in cities with bishoprics.

In 1386, Archbishop Antonio de' Saluzzi, supported by the population, promoted the reconstruction of a new and larger cathedral (12 May 1386), which was built on the site of the oldest religious heart of the city. For the new Milan Cathedral, basilica of Santa Tecla, the baptistery of San Giovanni alle Fonti, the cathedral of Santa Maria Maggiore and the baptistery of Santo Stefano alle Fonti began to be demolished, Basilica vetus was demolished first, Basilica maior later, in 1461–62 (partially rebuilt in 1489 and definitively demolished in 1548).

In 1447 Filippo Maria Visconti, Duke of Milan, died without a male heir; following the end of the Visconti line, the Ambrosian Republic was enacted. The Ambrosian Republic took its name from St. Ambrose, popular patron saint of the city of Milan. Both the Guelph and the Ghibelline factions worked together to bring about the Ambrosian Republic in Milan. Nonetheless, the Republic collapsed when, in 1450, Milan was conquered by Francesco Sforza, of the House of Sforza, who made Milan one of the leading cities of the Italian Renaissance. Under the House of Sforza, Milan experienced a period of great prosperity, which in particular saw the development of mulberry cultivation and silk processing.

Following this economic growth, works such as the Sforza Castle (already existing in the Visconti era under the name of Porta Giovia Castle, but re-adapted, enlarged and completed by the Sforza family) and the Ospedale Maggiore were completed. The Sforzas also managed to attract to Milan personalities such as Leonardo da Vinci, who redesigned and improved the function of the navigli and painted The Last Supper, and Bramante, who worked on the church of Santa Maria presso San Satiro, on the basilica of Sant'Ambrogio and to the church of Santa Maria delle Grazie, influencing the development of the Lombard Renaissance.

== Early modern ==
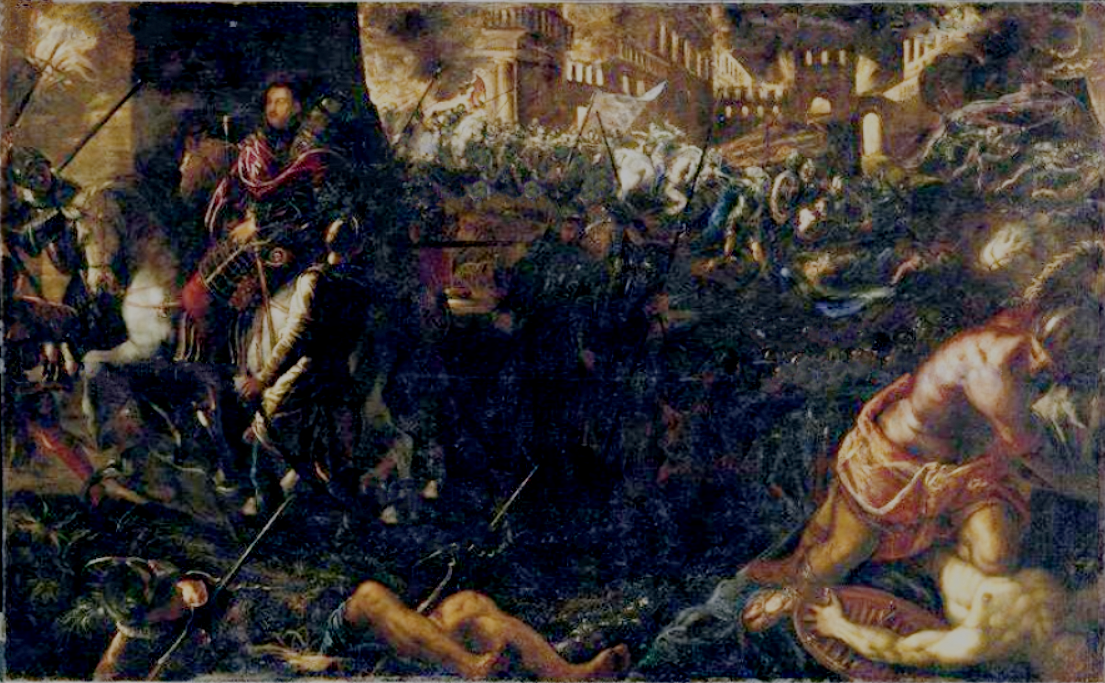
Duke Federico II Gonzaga enters Milan victorious after the Siege

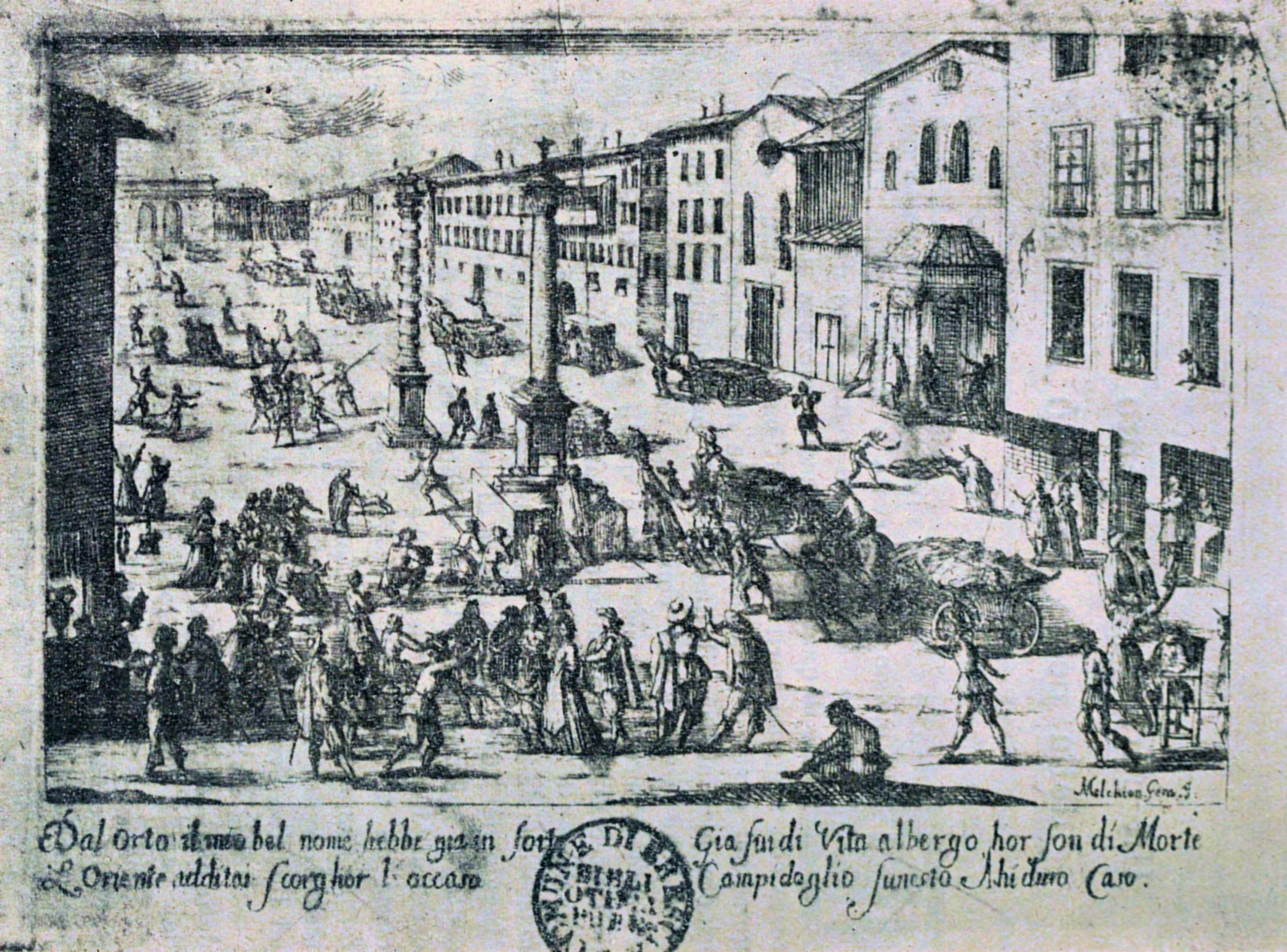
Milan during the plague of 1630: plague carts carry the dead for burial.

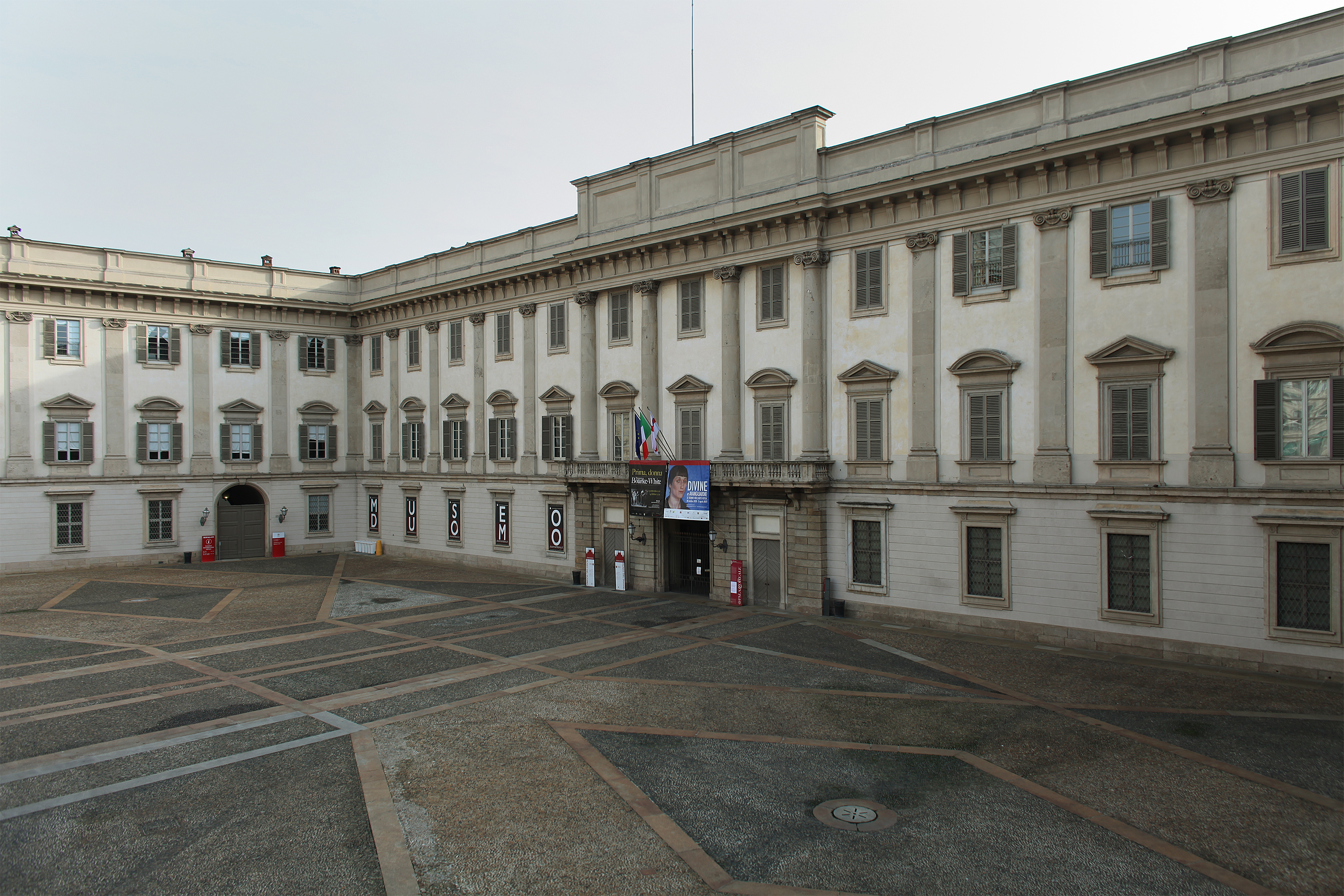
The Royal Palace of Milan, the seat of government of the city for many centuries, as redesigned by Piermarini from 1773 to 1778

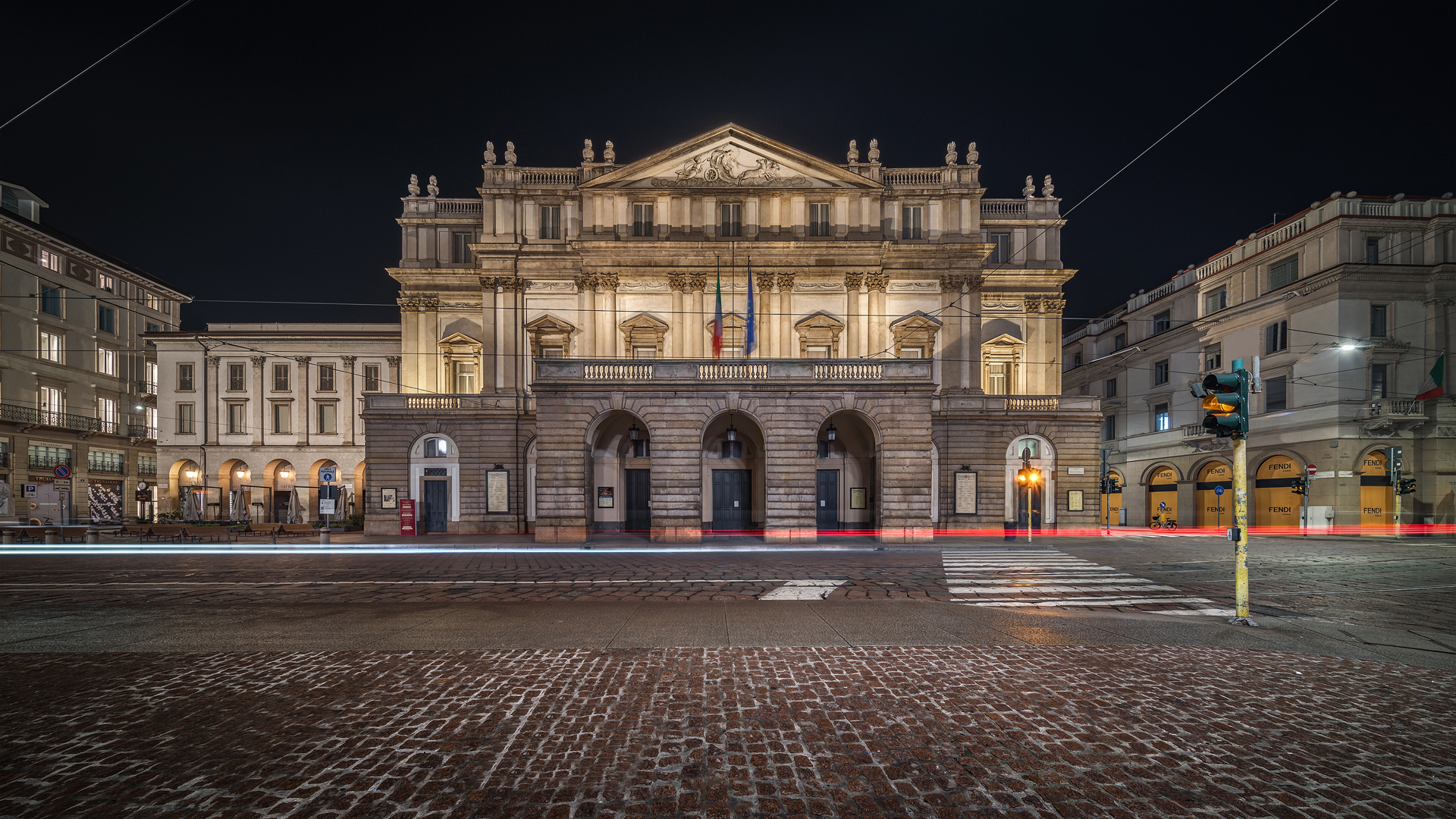
Founded in 1778, La Scala is the world's most famous opera house.

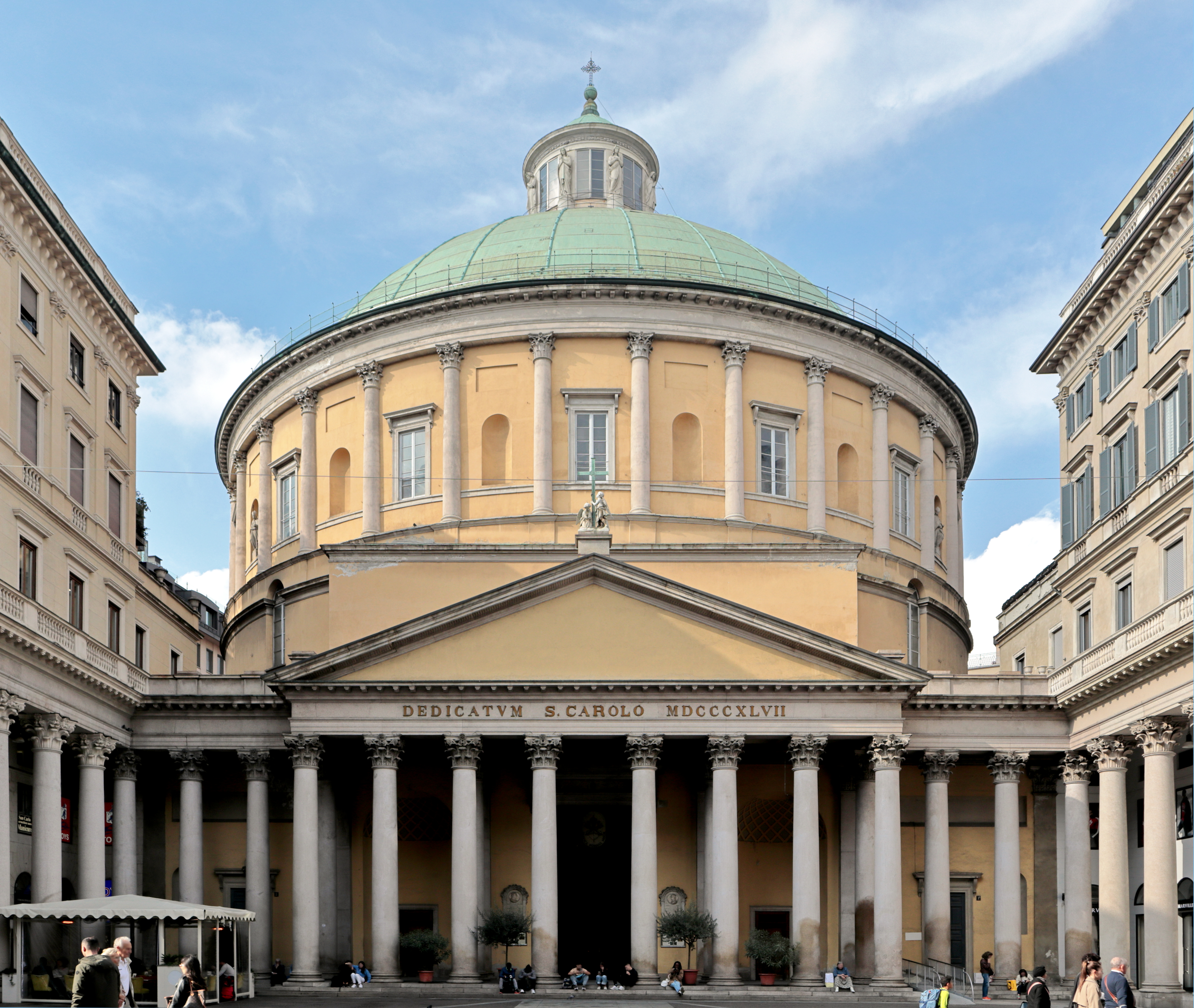
San Carlo al Corso, a neo-classic church in the center of Milan

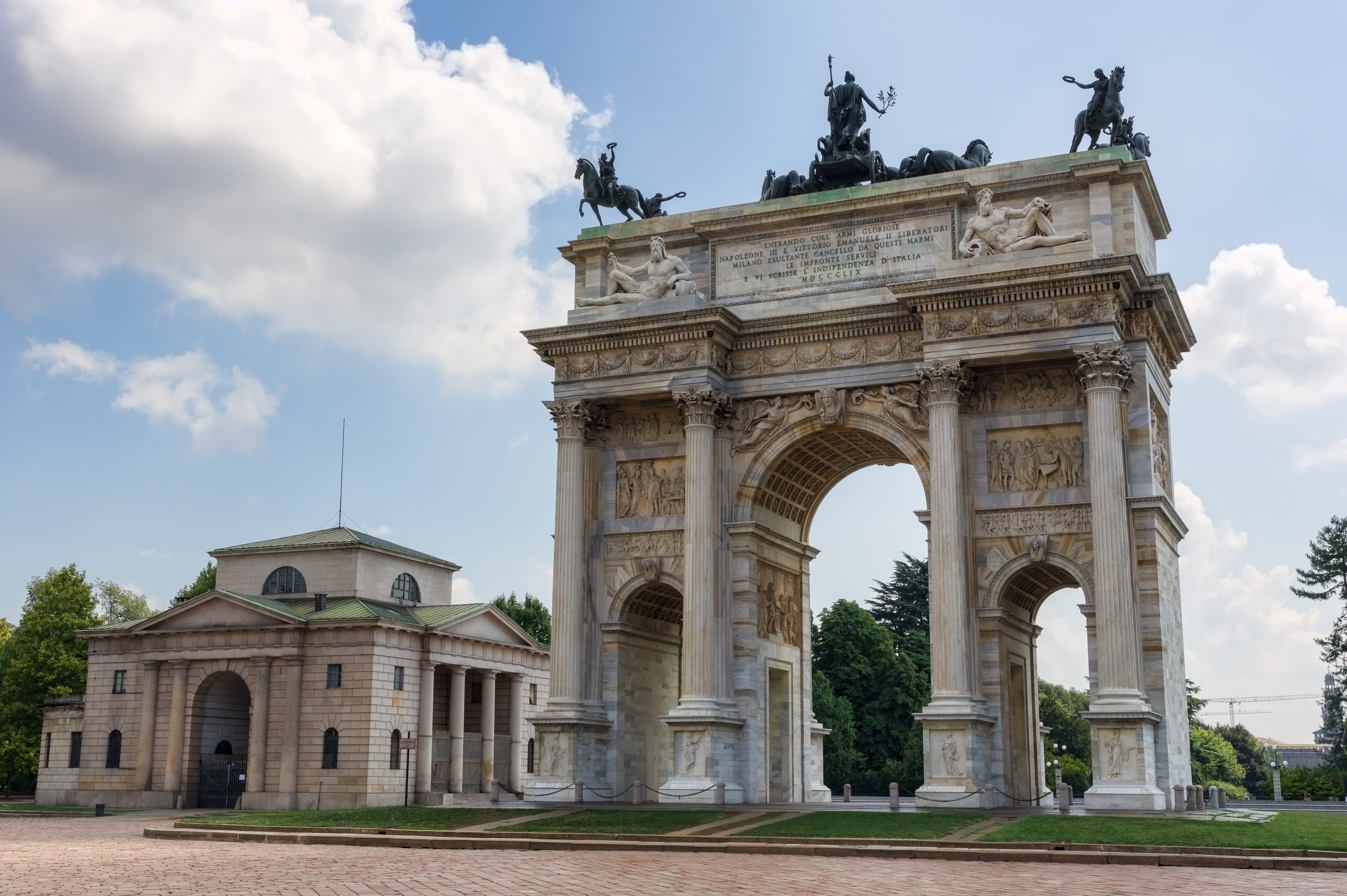
The Arch of the Peace, dating back to the 19th century, although its origins can be traced back to a gate of the Roman walls of Milan

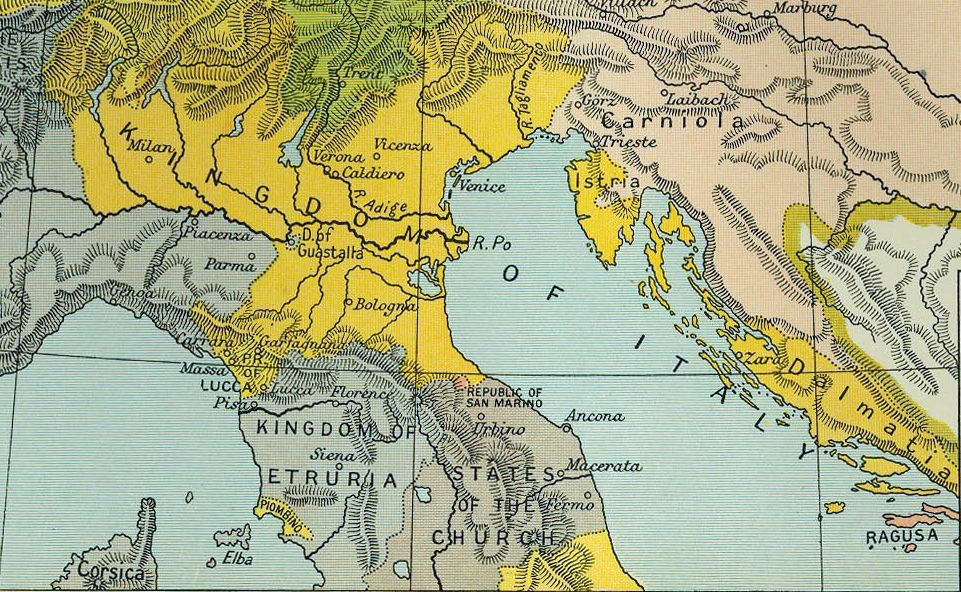
Highlighted in yellow, the Napoleonic Kingdom of Italy, which had Milan as its capital

The Italian Wars were a series of conflicts from 1494 to 1559 that involved, at various times, most of the city-states of Italy, the Papal States, the Republic of Venice, and later most of the major states of Western Europe. Milan's last independent ruler, Lodovico Sforza, called French king Charles VIII into Italy with the expectation that France might be an ally in inter-Italian wars. The future King of France, Louis of Orléans, took part in the expedition and realised Italy was virtually defenceless. This prompted him to return a few years later in 1500, and claim the Duchy of Milan for himself, his grandmother having been a member of the ruling Visconti family. At that time, Milan was also defended by Swiss mercenaries. After the victory of Louis's successor Francis I over the Swiss at the Battle of Marignan, the duchy was promised to the French king. When the Holy Roman Emperor and King of Spain Charles V defeated Francis I at the Battle of Pavia in 1525, northern Italy, including Milan, returned to Francesco II Sforza, passing to the Emperor 10 years later when he died.

In 1556, Charles V abdicated in favour of his son Philip II and his brother Ferdinand I. Charles's Italian possessions, including Milan, passed to Philip II and remained with the Spanish line of Habsburgs, while Ferdinand's Austrian line of Habsburgs ruled the Holy Roman Empire. A 150-year period of Spanish domination then began. These years saw the rather oppressive ideological and fiscal control of the Spanish governors. There was a revival of the economy until the beginning of the 16th century, also as a consequence of the end of a long period of turbulence.

Under the Spanish viceroys from 1535, Milan became one of the contributors to the Spanish king's army. At the time, Lombardy was a valuable tool for the Spanish military; an armory of paramount strategic importance. In addition to resources, Milan also provided soldiers. During the 1635–1659 Franco-Spanish War, Milan sent and paid for on average 4,000 soldiers per year to the Spanish crown, with many of these men serving in the Low Countries against the Dutch States Army.

The Great Plague of Milan in 1629–31 killed an estimated 60,000 people out of a population of 130,000. This episode is considered one of the last outbreaks of the centuries-long pandemic of plague that began with the Black Death. There was then a profound demographic and economic crisis around 1630 due to the plague (the same one described by Alessandro Manzoni in the novel The Betrothed) and the arrival of the German army; then there were phenomena of economic stagnation which fit into a situation of depression which was generally found in the Italian peninsula until the mid-18th century.

In 1700 the Spanish line of Habsburgs was extinguished with the death of Charles II. After his death, the War of the Spanish Succession began in 1701 with the occupation of all Spanish possessions by French troops backing the claim of the French Philippe of Anjou to the Spanish throne. In 1706, the French were defeated at the Battle of Turin and were forced to yield northern Italy to the Austrian Habsburgs. In 1713–1714 the Treaties of Utrecht and Rastatt formally confirmed Austrian sovereignty over most of Spain's Italian possessions including Lombardy and its capital, Milan.

A period of lively reforms began around the middle of the 18th century under the reign of Maria Theresa of Austria and continued with the reign of Joseph II of Austria. In this period, Milan began to play a primary role again both on a cultural level (sensitivity and contributions towards the Age of Enlightenment) and on an economic level. There are several institutions, still active today, that were founded or sponsored by the Austrians, in the first or second period. Among these are the Teatro alla Scala, the schools and the Brera Academy (housed in a convent confiscated from the Jesuits), the Brera Botanical Garden (containing one of the oldest Ginkgo biloba trees in Europe), the Braidense National Library (Maria Teresa made it public after it was previously private) and the Cassa di Risparmio delle Provincie Lombarde.

Between the second half of the 18th century and the first half of the 19th century, Neoclassicism flourished in Milan. During the end of the reign of Maria Theresa of Austria, throughout the subsequent Napoleonic Kingdom of Italy and the return of Austrian, Milan was the protagonist of a strong cultural and economic rebirth, during which Neoclassicism was the dominant artistic style and the greatest expression. The Milanese neoclassical season was therefore among the most important in Italy and Europe.

Notable developments of the Milanese neoclassical season include construction of the Teatro alla Scala, the restyled Royal Palace, and the Brera institutions including the Academy of Fine Arts, the Braidense Library and the Brera Astronomical Observatory. Neoclassicism also led to the development of monumental city gates, new squares and boulevards, as well as public gardens and private mansions. Latterly, two churches, San Tomaso in Terramara and San Carlo al Corso, were completed in Neoclassical style before the period came to an end in the late 1830s.

Napoleon invaded Italy in 1796. Milan was the capital of the Transpadane Republic from 1796 to 1797, of the Cisalpine Republic from 1797 to 1802, of the Napoleonic Italian Republic from 1802 to 1805 and of the Napoleonic Kingdom of Italy from 1805 to 1814. On 26 May 1805, Napoleon crowned himself King of Italy in the Milan Cathedral with the Iron Crown.

He conceived the completion of the Sforza Castle with the Foro Buonaparte, a project he later rejected due to the excessive cost, but which generated the current road semicircle, which was envisaged around the surviving nucleus of the Sforza Castle (not yet renovated at the time) a new seat of the republican government formed by an imposing Doric colonnade and some buildings that would become the new political center of the city; the only part of the Foro Buonaparte that was actually built were the Arena Civica and the Parco Sempione.

For Napoleon, in 1807, the Arco della Pace was begun, which was completed during the second Austrian domination. Designed by Luigi Cagnola and conceived as the "Victory Arch" to celebrate the French victory in the Battle of Jena, it was built starting in late 1807. The work was two thirds complete when, with the fall of Napoleon (1814), the project was abandoned and then resumed in 1826 during the reign of the Habsburg emperor Francis I of Austria, who changed the dedication. The Arco della Pace ('Arch of Peace') was then completed in 1838.

Once Napoleon's occupation ended, the Congress of Vienna returned Lombardy, and Milan, along with Veneto, to Austrian control in 1814. During this period, Milan became a centre of lyric opera. Here in the 1770s Mozart had premiered three operas at the Teatro Regio Ducale. Later La Scala became the reference theatre in the world, with its premieres of Bellini, Donizetti, Rossini and Verdi. Verdi himself is interred in the Casa di Riposo per Musicisti, which he initially founded. In the 19th century, other important theatres were La Cannobiana and the Teatro Carcano.

== Late modern ==
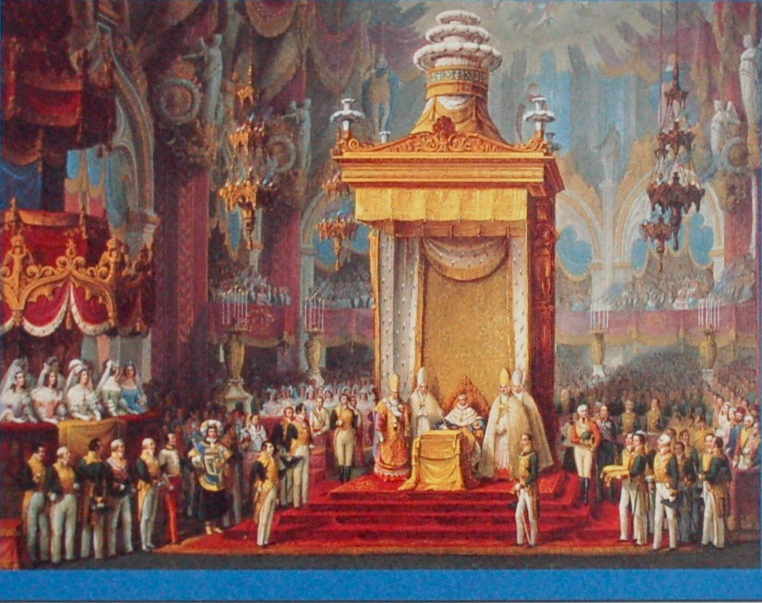
Coronation ceremony of Ferdinand I as second King of Lombardy-Veneto in the Duomo (1838)

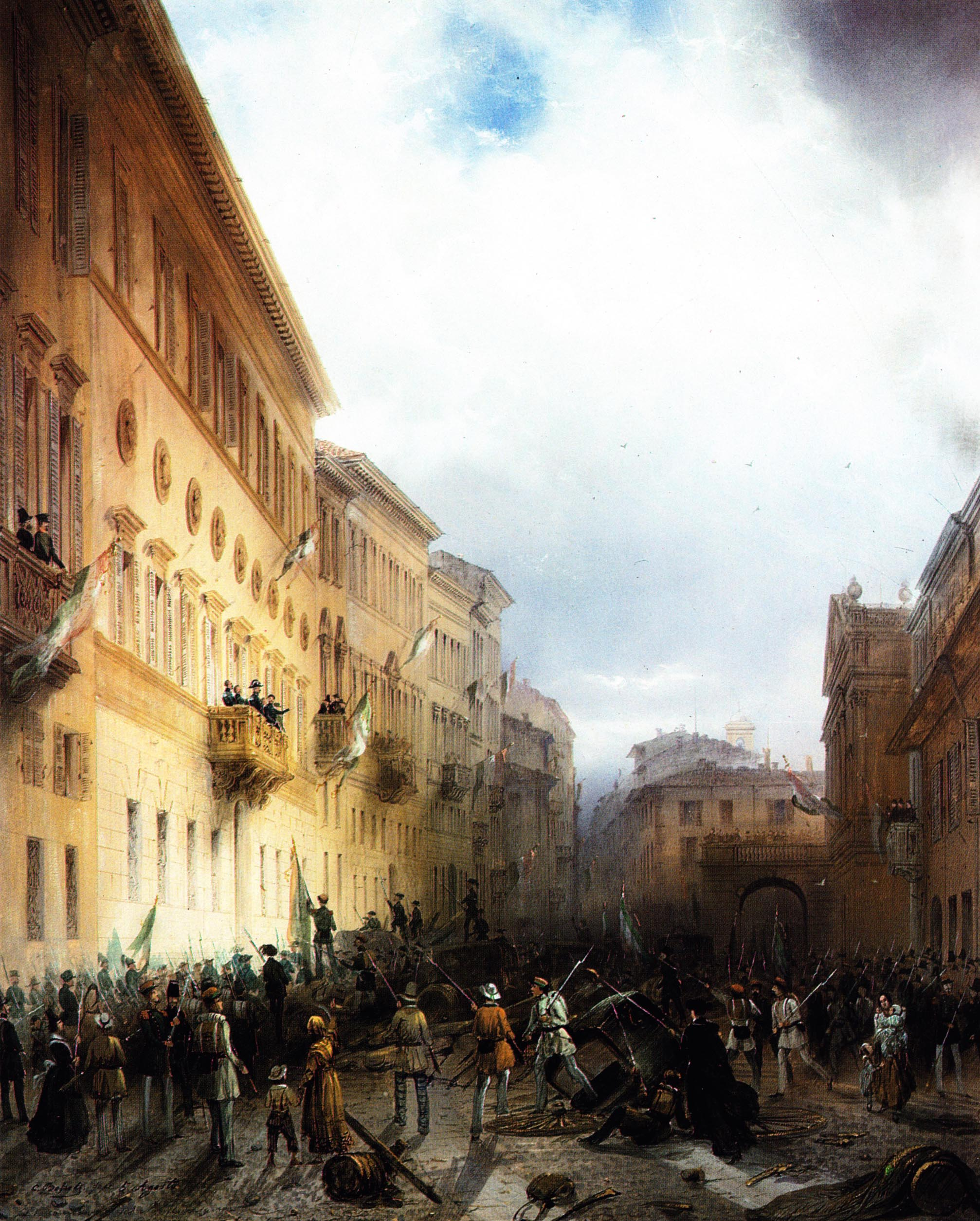
King Carlo Alberto he is acclaimed by the Milanese citizens during first independence war (1848)

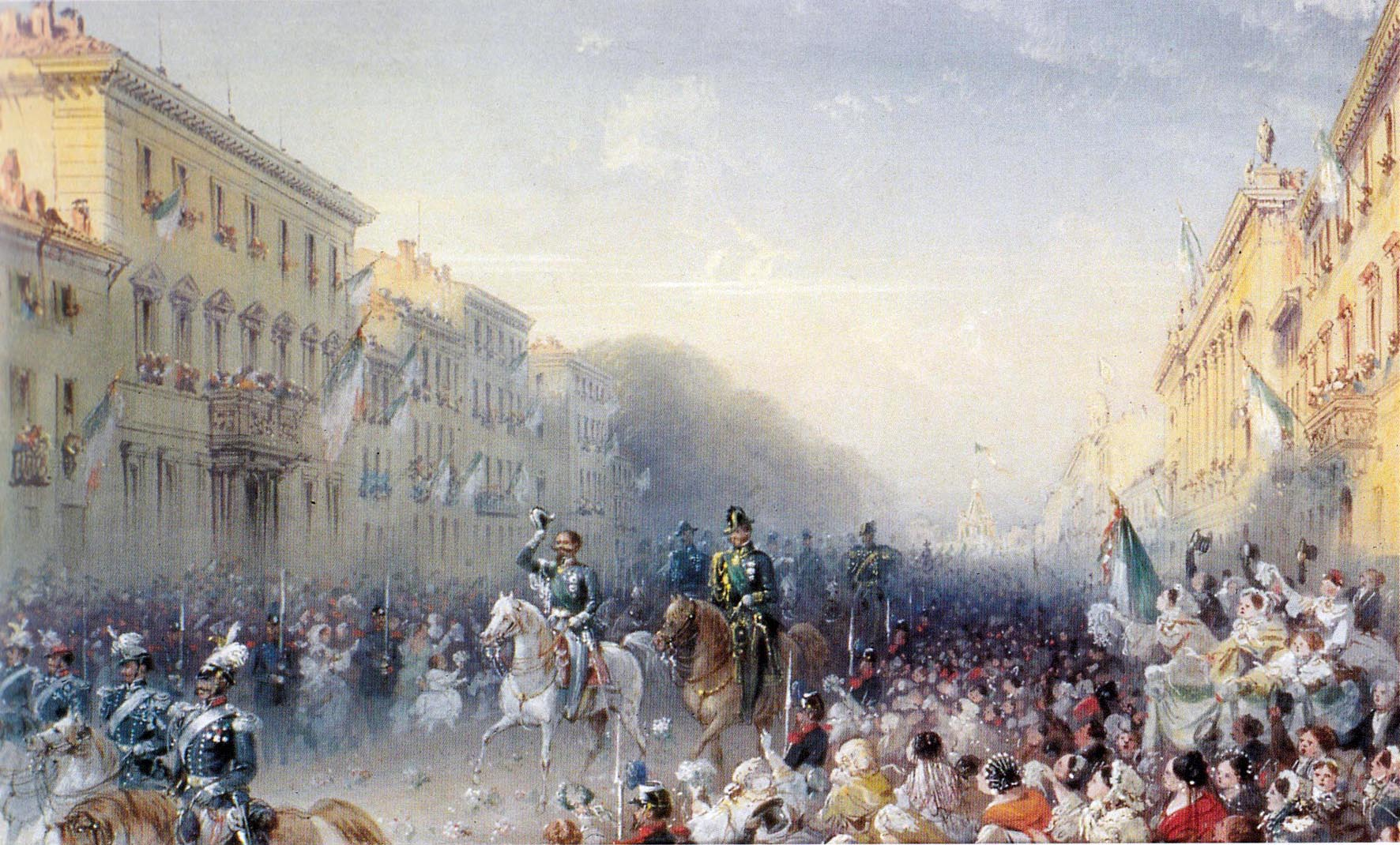
King Victor Emmanuel II entrer Milan during the Second Italian War of Independence (1859)

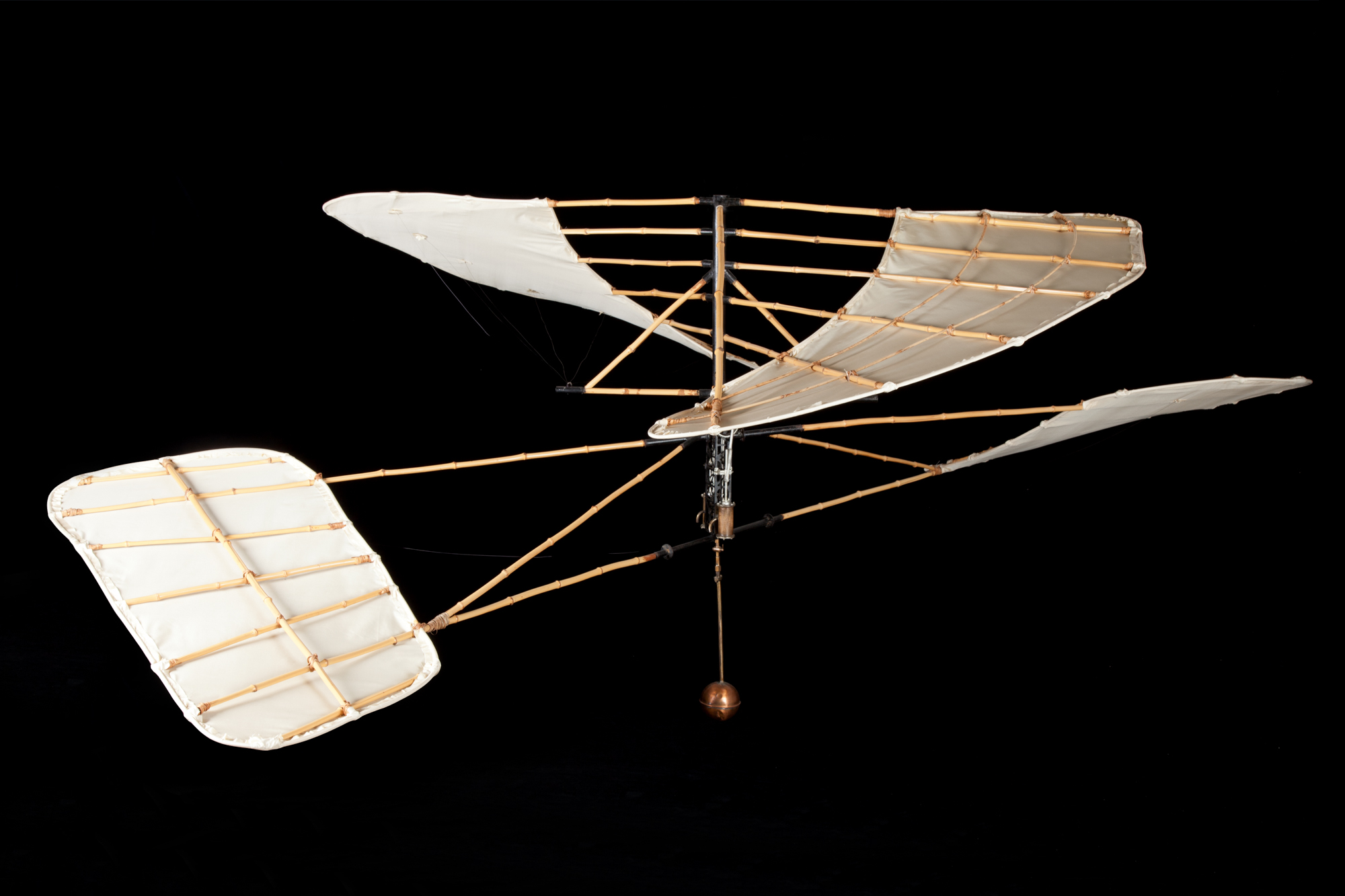
Experimental helicopter by Enrico Forlanini (1877), exposed at the Museo nazionale della scienza e della tecnologia Leonardo da Vinci of Milan

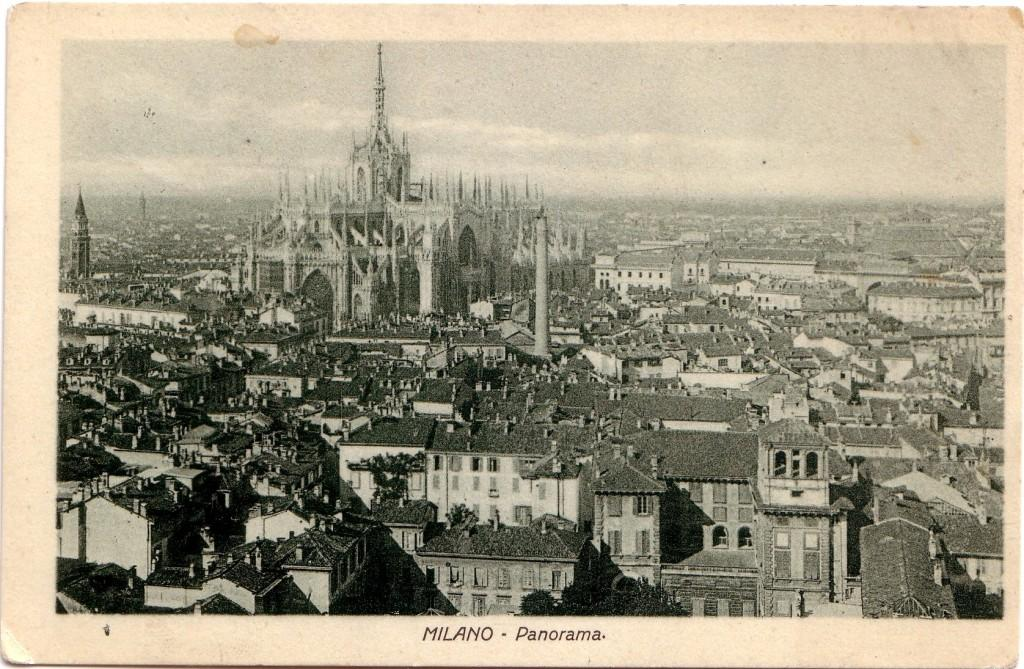
A view of Milan in 1910. The chimney of the Santa Radegonda plant near Milan Cathedral is clearly visible. The plant, built in 1883, was the first power plant in Continental Europe

The new territorial structure of Italy was decided at the Congress of Vienna. On 7 April 1815, the constitution of the Austrian States in Italy was announced. Milan became the capital of the Kingdom of Lombardy-Venetia, formally independent, but in reality subject to the Austrian Empire. Administratively the Kingdom of Lombardy–Venetia comprised two independent governments (Gubernien) in its two parts, which officially were declared separate crown lands in 1851. Each part was further subdivided into several provinces, roughly corresponding with the départements of the Napoleonic Kingdom of Italy.

For the first time since 1428, Lombardy reappeared as an entity, the first time in history that the term "Lombardy" was officially used to call specifically that entity and not for the whole of Northern Italy. The Kingdom of Lombardy-Venetia administration used Italian as its language in its internal and external communications and documents, and the language's dominant position in politics, finance or jurisdiction was not questioned by the Austrian officials. The Italian-language Gazzetta di Milano was the official newspaper of the kingdom. The highest governorships were also reserved for Austrian aristocrats.

The second Austrian period was turbulent and characterized by continuous tension due to the patriotic ferments that were widespread throughout Italy, including Milan, whose objective was to unify Italy by freeing it from foreigners. In this historical period, which is called the Risorgimento, on 18 March 1848, Milan effectively rebelled against Austrian rule, during the so-called "Five Days" (Italian: Le Cinque Giornate), that forced Field Marshal Radetzky to temporarily withdraw from the city. The bordering Kingdom of Piedmont–Sardinia sent troops to protect the insurgents, starting the First Italian War of Independence, and organised a plebiscite that ratified by a huge majority the unification of Lombardy with Piedmont–Sardinia. But just a few months later the Austrians were able to send fresh forces that routed the Piedmontese army at the Battle of Custoza on 24 July and to reassert Austrian control over northern Italy.

About 10 years later, however, Italian nationalist politicians, officers and intellectuals such as Cavour, Garibaldi and Mazzini were able to gather a huge consensus and to pressure the monarchy to forge an alliance with the new French Empire of Napoleon III to defeat Austria during the Second Italian War of Independence and establish a large Italian state in the region. At the Battle of Solferino in 1859 French and Italian troops heavily defeated the Austrians that retreated under the Quadrilateral line. Following this battle, Milan and the rest of Lombardy were incorporated into Piedmont-Sardinia, which then proceeded to annex all the other Italian statelets and proclaim the birth of the Kingdom of Italy on 17 March 1861.

The political unification of Italy enhanced Milan's economic dominance over northern Italy. On 5 March 1876, the first issue of the newspaper Corriere della Sera was published, founded and directed by Eugenio Torelli Viollier, which would become the first Italian newspaper in terms of circulation and political relevance. In 1883, the Santa Radegonda Power Plant was inaugurated in Milan, in the street of the same name (next to the Milan Cathedral), the first power station in continental Europe, second in all of Europe compared to the Holborn Viaduct power station in London, in operation since April 1882, which however illuminated the only viaduct from which it took its name.

In 1877, Enrico Forlanini developed an early helicopter powered by a steam engine. It was the first of its type that rose to a height of 13 metres, where it remained for some 20 seconds, after a vertical take-off from a park in Milan. Milan has dedicated to Enrico Forlanini its city airport, also named Linate Airport, as well as the nearby park, the Parco Forlanini. In Milan he also has an avenue named after him, Viale Enrico Forlanini.

A dense rail network, whose construction had started under Austrian patronage, was completed in a brief time, making Milan the rail hub of northern Italy and, with the opening of the Gotthard (1882) and Simplon (1906) railway tunnels, the major South European rail hub for goods and passenger transport. Indeed, Milan and Venice were among the main stops of the Orient Express that started operating from 1919. Abundant hydroelectric resources allowed the development of a strong steel and textile sector and, as Milanese banks dominated Italy's financial sphere, the city became the country's leading financial centre.

In May 1898, Milan was shaken by the Bava Beccaris massacre, a riot named after the Italian General Fiorenzo Bava Beccaris related to soaring cost of living. In Italy the suppression of these demonstrations is also known as Fatti di Maggio (Events of May) or I moti di Milano del 1898 (the Milan riots of 1898). At least 80 demonstrators were killed, as well as two soldiers, and 450 wounded, according to government sources. The overreaction of the military led to the demise of Antonio Di Rudinì and his government in July 1898 and created a constitutional crisis, strengthening the opposition. The events of May marked a height of popular discontent with government, the military and the monarchy.

On 16 December 1899 AC Milan was founded, from which in 1908, due to internal disagreements, the city rival Inter Milan was split. AC Milan has a long-standing rivalry with Inter Milan, with whom they contest the Derby della Madonnina, one of the most followed derbies in football. It is called Derby della Madonnina in honour of one of the main sights in the city of Milan, the statue of the Virgin Mary on the top of the Duomo, which is often referred to as the Madonnina ("Little Madonna" in Italian). In the past, Inter Milan (commonly abbreviated to Inter) was seen as the club of the Milan bourgeoisie (nicknamed bauscia, a Milanese term meaning "braggart"), whereas AC Milan was supported mainly by the working class (nicknamed casciavid, meaning "screwdriver", with reference to the blue-collar worker).

== 20th century ==
=== First half of the century ===
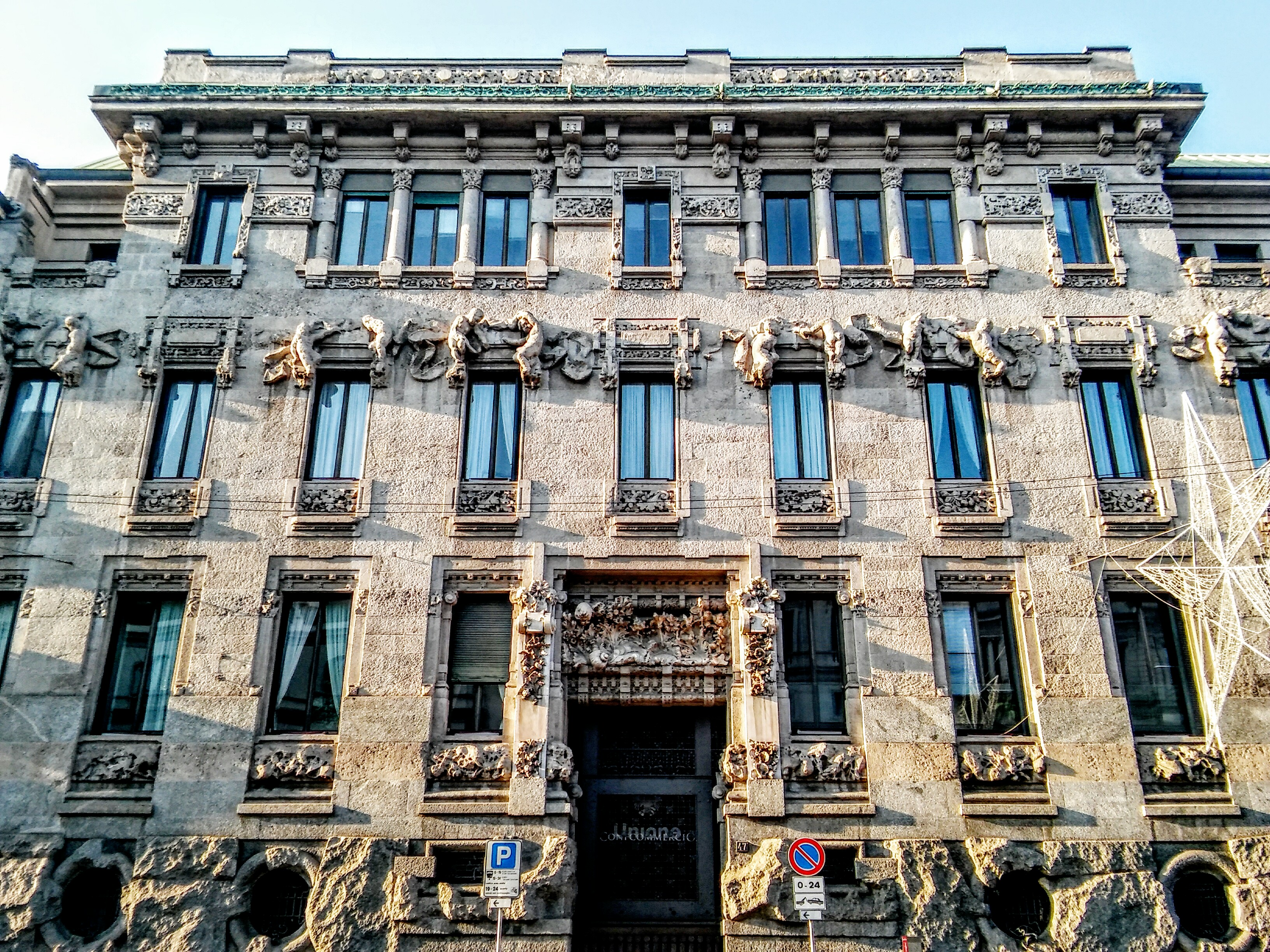
Palazzo Castiglioni, an Art Nouveau palace of Milan

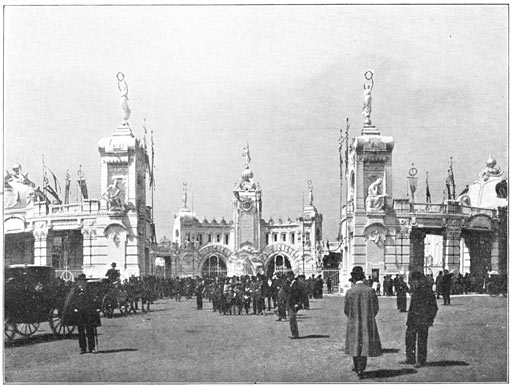
Expo 1906, which took place in Milan

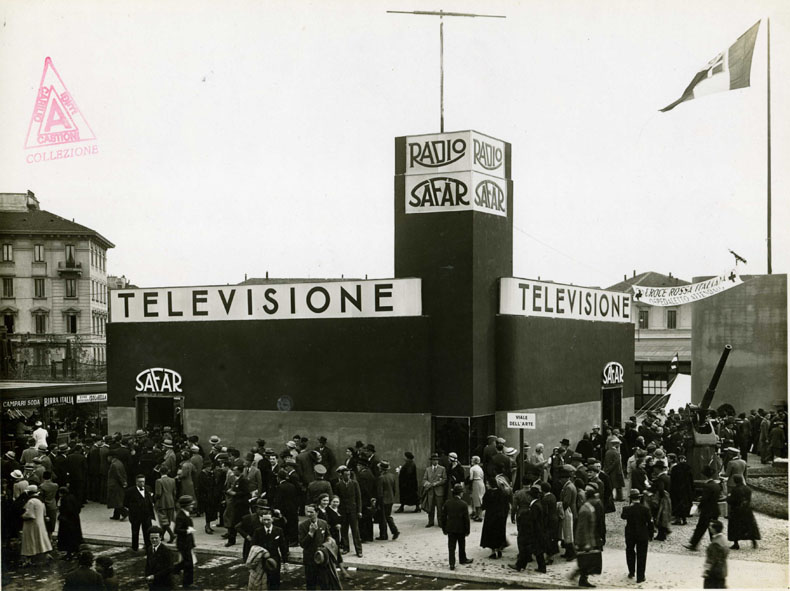
Fiera di Milano in 1933

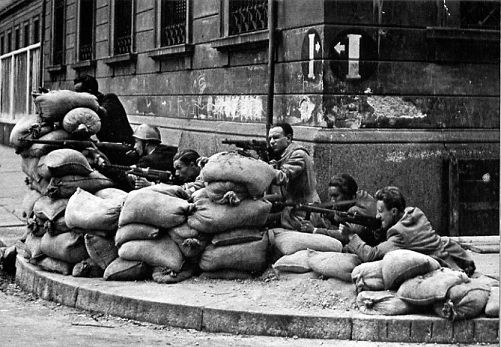
Italian partisans in Milan during the final insurrection leading to the liberation of Italy in April 1945

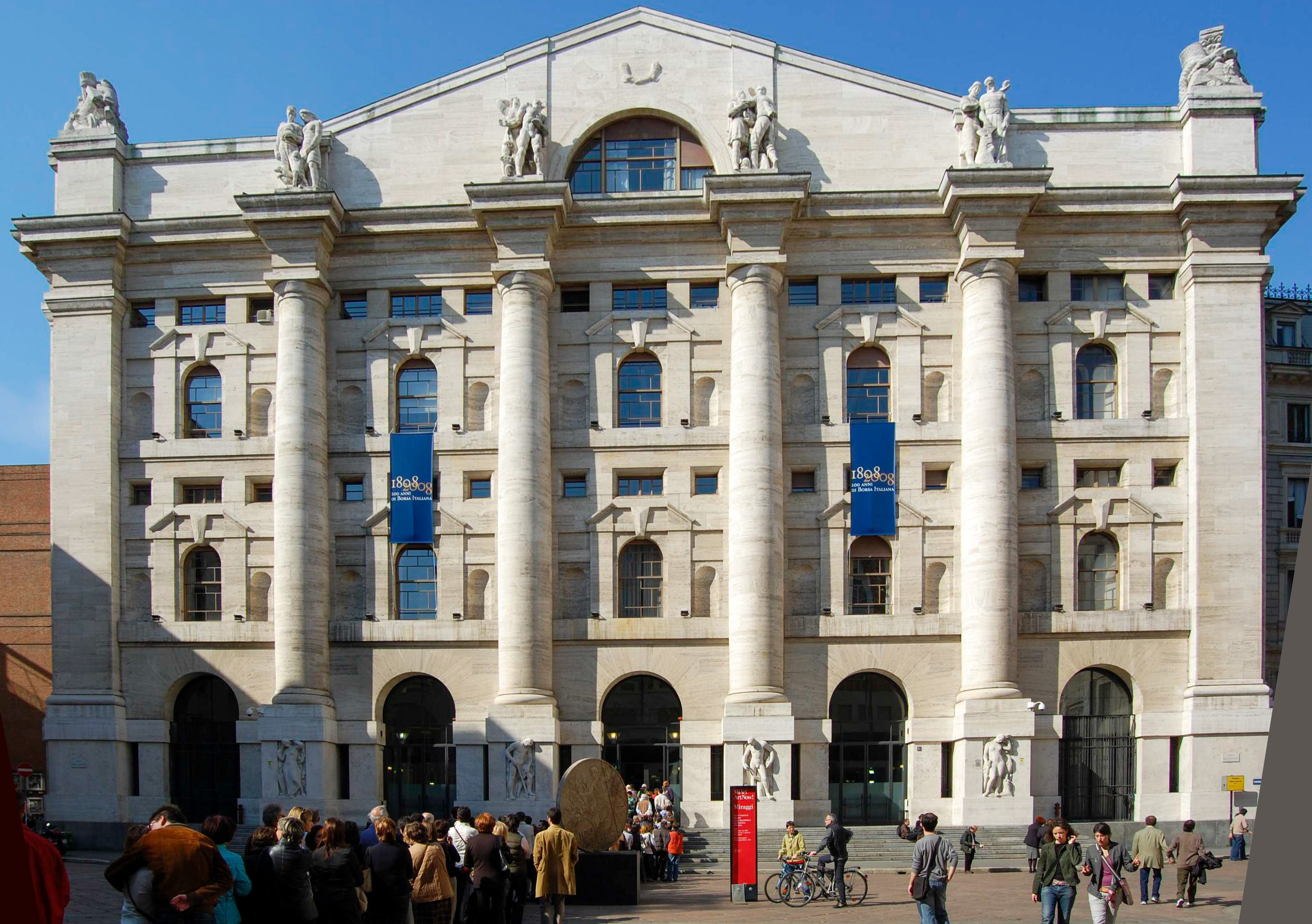
Palazzo Mezzanotte in Milan, the seat of the Italian stock exchange

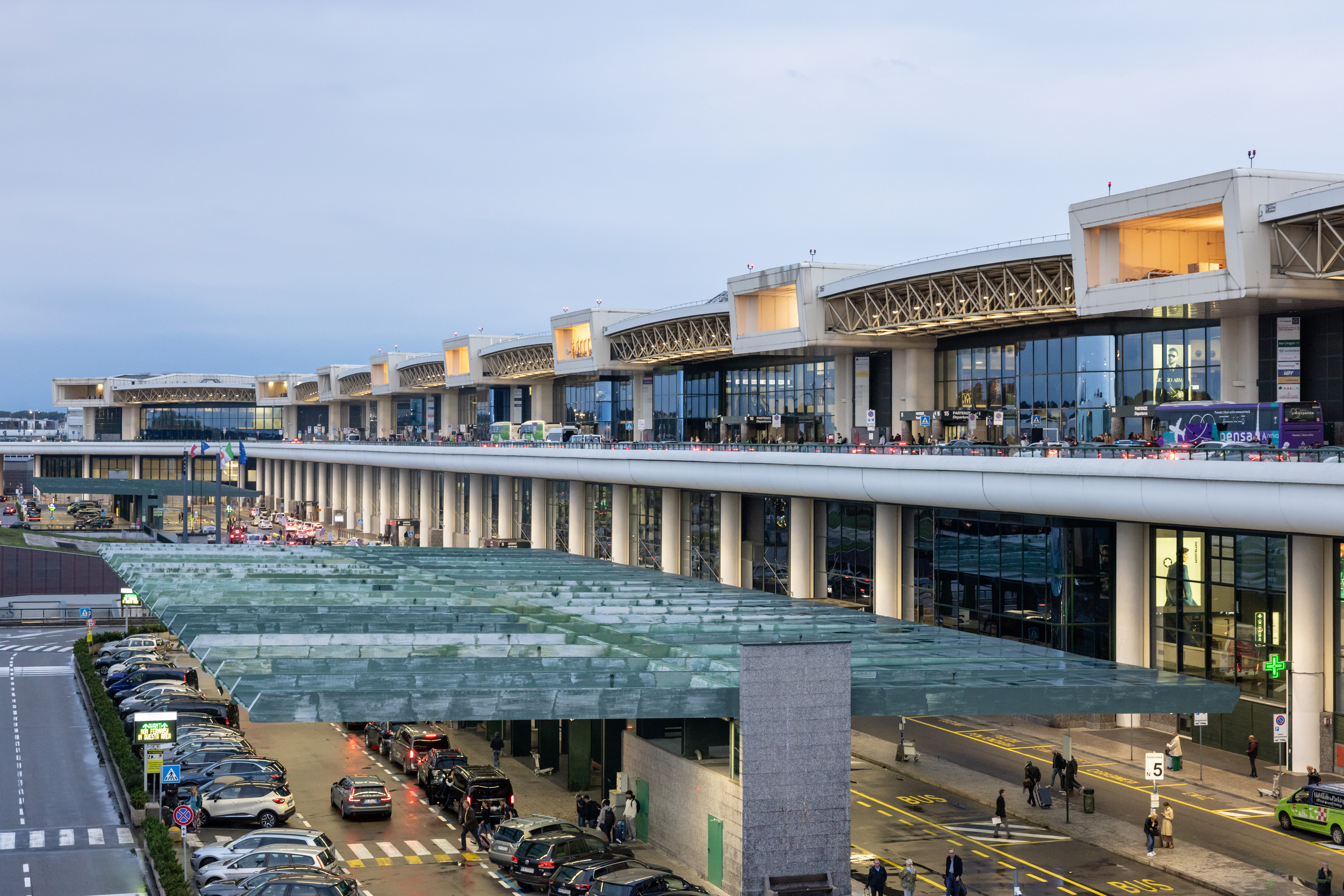
Milan Malpensa Airport

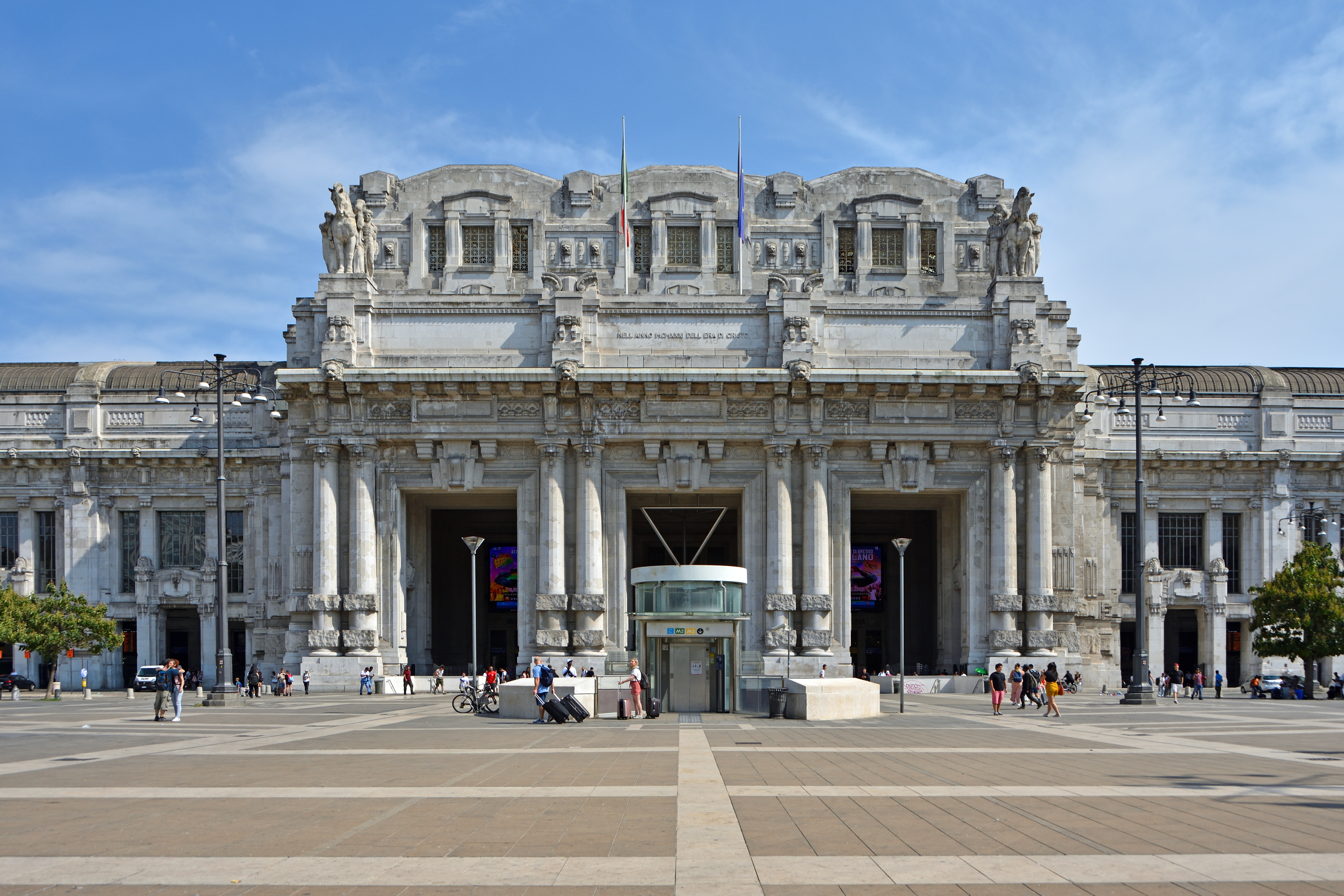
Milano Centrale railway station

From the 20th century onwards Milan became the industrial and financial capital of Italy, one of the economic capitals of Europe and a global financial centre. Milan was the site of the Expo 1906, which occupied the entire area of Sempione Park and the area that would subsequently be occupied by the Fiera di Milano, now redeveloped under the name of CityLife. Very little remains from that time; the most significant work remaining is the Civic Aquarium of Milan, which is the third oldest aquarium in Europe. At the beginning of the 20th century, Milan was a socialist city of workers' struggles; in 1911 the headquarters of the official socialist newspaper Avanti! was moved there. The election of Emilio Caldara, the city's first socialist mayor, took place in 1914. At the same time it was the intellectual center of Italian Futurism. On 14 November 1914, again in Milan, the printing of Il Popolo d'Italia began, the interventionist newspaper founded by Benito Mussolini, who was still part of the Italian Socialist Party at the time.

Borsa Italiana, based in Milan at Palazzo Mezzanotte, is the Italian stock exchange. The Borsa di commercio di Milano (Milan Stock Exchange) was established by Eugène de Beauharnais, viceroy of the Napoleonic Kingdom of Italy, through decrees dated 16 January and 6 February 1808. It overtook the historically poorly regulated Borsa di Genova, later becoming Italy's main stock exchange after the Panic of 1907. It operated under public ownership until 1998, when it was privatized. In 1997, all the Italian stocks were merged. Before that year, other smaller stock exchanges were based in Naples, Turin, Trieste, Venice, Genoa, Florence, Bologna, Rome, and Palermo. In 1991, the electronic exchanges were approved, and in 1994, the market with grids (A, B, C) was abolished. In Milan were also the currencies exchange rates fixing and the commodities fixing.

Milan Malpensa Airport was opened in 1909 by Giovanni Agusta and Gianni Caproni to test their aircraft prototypes, before switching to civil operation in 1948. The airport is the largest international airport in northern Italy, serving Lombardy, Piedmont and Liguria, as well as the Swiss canton of Ticino. The airport is located 49 kilometres (30 mi) northwest of Milan, next to the Ticino river dividing Lombardy and Piedmont. The airport is located inside the Parco naturale lombardo della Valle del Ticino, a nature reserve included by UNESCO in the World Network of Biosphere Reserves. Malpensa Airport is 9th in the world and 6th in Europe for the number of countries served with direct scheduled flights. In 2022, Malpensa Airport handled 21.3 million passengers and was the 23rd busiest airport in Europe in terms of passengers and 2nd busiest airport in Italy in terms of passengers after Rome Fiumicino Airport. It is the busiest airport in Italy for freight and cargo, handling 721,254 tons of international freight annually (2022).

At the beginning of the 20th century the Milanese bourgeois class formed as a result of industrialization and already becoming masters of the social and economic life of the city, found in the new Art Nouveau style, called Stile Liberty in Italian, a "symbol of status" and the occasion to show its power and at the same time underline the clear departure from the noble class and its neoclassical and baroque residences. Art Nouveau in Milan found, due to its close relationship with the rampant industrial bourgeoisie of the time, a fertile ground for its rapid development, during which it oscillated between the influences of French Art Nouveau, German Jugendstil and eclecticism.

During World War I, the city played a rearguard role, a shelter for wounded soldiers convalescing (including Ernest Hemingway, who remembered his days in Milan in the famous novel A Farewell to Arms) and as a center for the production of war material, being directly hit from the war on the occasion of a single Austrian air raid on 14 February 1916, which caused the death of 18 people. Milan's northern location in Italy closer to Europe, secured also a leading role for the city on the political scene. It was in Milan that Benito Mussolini built his political and journalistic careers, and his fascist Blackshirts rallied for the first time in the city's Piazza San Sepolcro; here the future Fascist dictator launched his March on Rome on 28 October 1922.

Linate Airport was built next to Idroscalo of Milan in the 1930s when Taliedo Airport, located 1 km (0.62 mi) from the southern border of Milan and one of the world's first aerodromes and airports, became too small for commercial traffic. Linate was completely rebuilt in the 1950s and again in the 1980s. Its name comes from the small village where it is located in the town of Peschiera Borromeo. Its official name is Airport Enrico Forlanini, after the Italian inventor and aeronautical pioneer born in Milan. Linate airport buildings are located in the Segrate Municipality, and the field is located for a large part in the Peschiera Borromeo Municipality. It served 7,719,977 passengers in 2022 with 101,956 aircraft movements in 2022 making it one of the busiest airports in Italy.

The 20 years of fascism saw the creation of a series of public works in Milan, with administrators such as Ernesto Belloni, the first mayor of Milan of the new fascist administrative system, who took office in 1926: On 23 May 1930 the Milan Planetarium given to the city by the publisher Ulrico Hoepli opened. On 28 October the Idroscalo was inaugurated, construction of which had begun in 1928, while the Palace of Justice was built from 1932 to 1940. Milano Centrale railway station, built from 1913 to 1931, is the second railway station in Italy for passenger flow (after Roma Termini) and the largest railway station in Europe by volume. Milano Centrale railway station has no definite architectural style, but is a blend of many different styles, especially Liberty and Art Deco, but not limited to those. It is adorned with numerous sculptures.

During World War II, Milan's large industrial and transport facilities suffered extensive damage from Allied bombings that often also hit residential districts. When Italy surrendered in 1943, German forces occupied and plundered most of northern Italy, fueling the birth of a massive resistance guerrilla movement. On 29 April 1945, the American 1st Armored Division was advancing on Milan but, before it arrived, the Italian resistance seized control of the city and executed Mussolini along with his mistress and several regime officers, that were later hanged and exposed in Piazzale Loreto, where one year before some resistance members had been executed. On 25 April 1945, with Allied troops approaching and German troops fleeing the city, the National Liberation Committee proclaimed the city's insurrection. On the same day the city was liberated. The day was proclaimed the Anniversary of the Liberation of Italy, and the city was awarded the Gold Medal of Military Valor for Resistance merits. The contribution given by the Milanese factories and the nearby Sesto San Giovanni was decisive in all phases of the Milanese Resistance.

=== Second half of the century ===
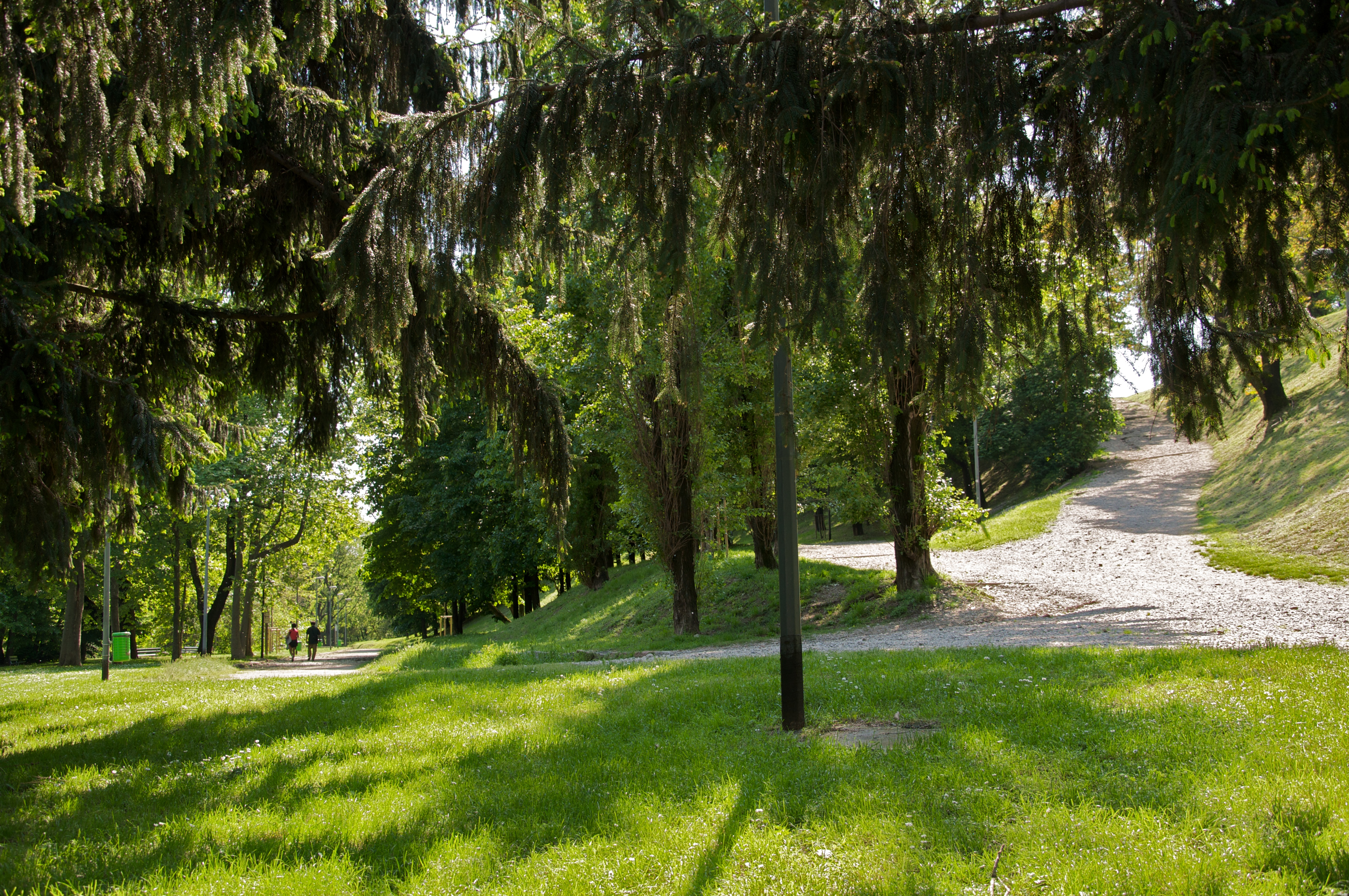
Monte Stella

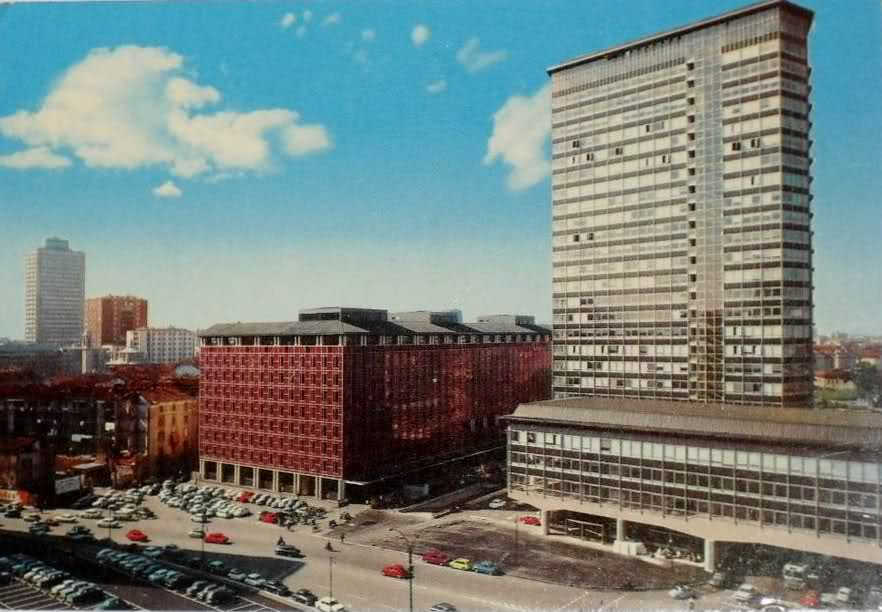
Skyscrapers and large buildings in the 1960s, such as that of the Centro Direzionale di Milano, iconographically represent the Italian economic miracle.

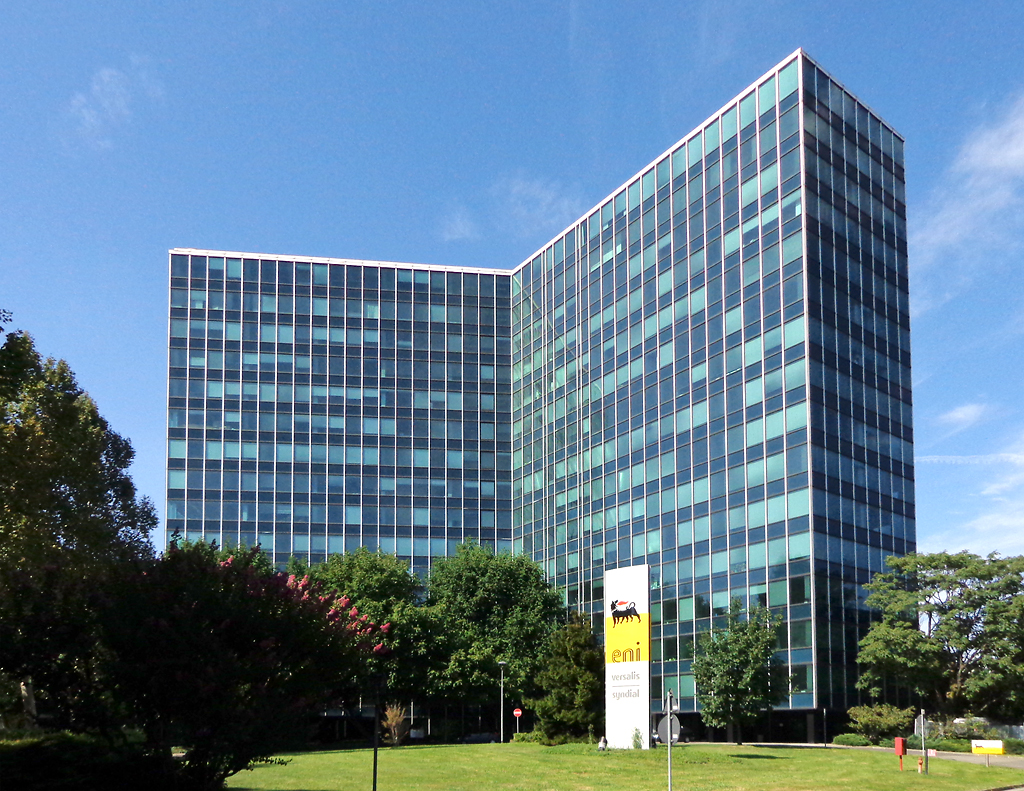
Eni headquarters in Metanopoli (frazione of San Donato Milanese) at the southern border of Milan. Eni is considered one of the world's oil and gas "Supermajors"

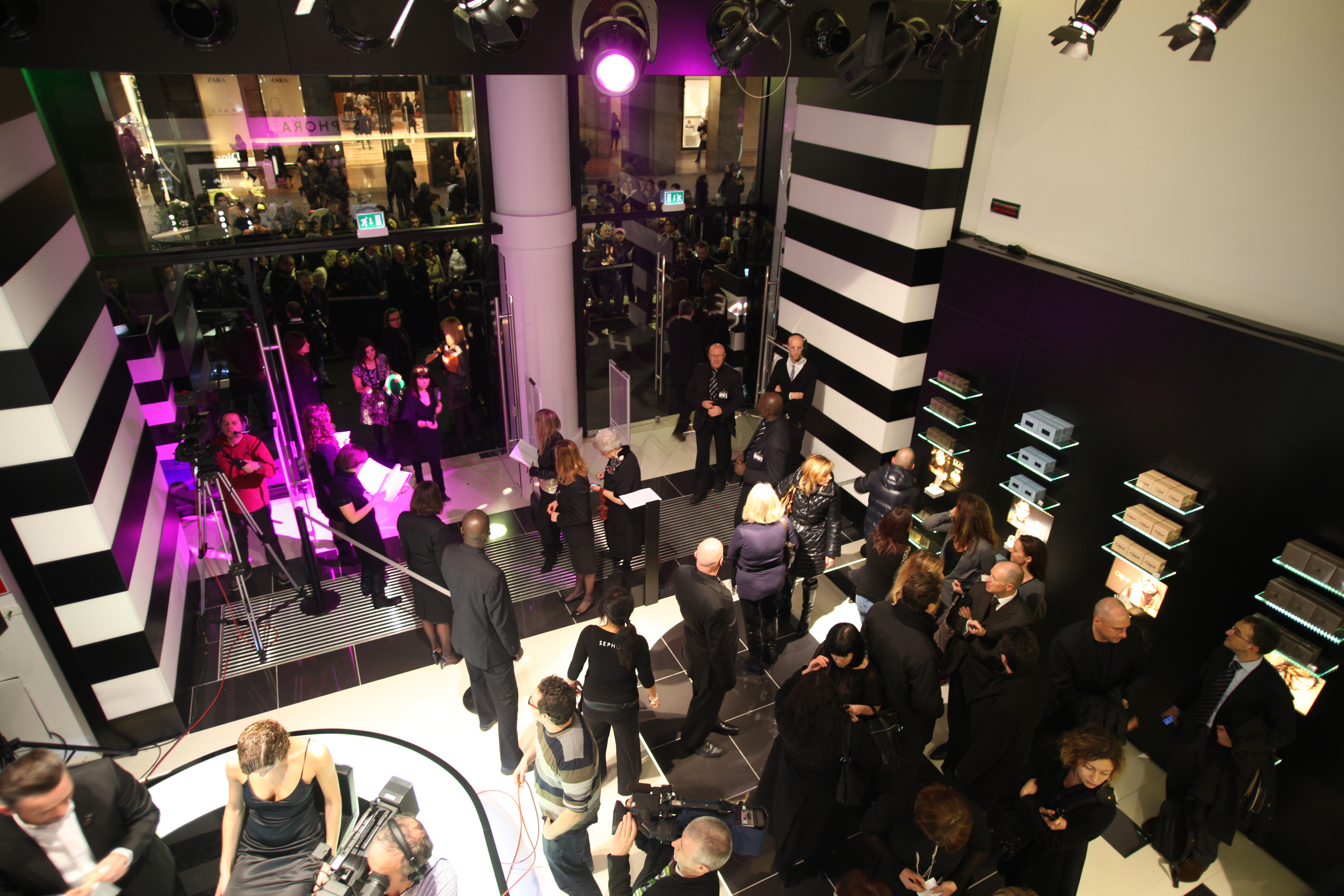
Milan Fashion Week

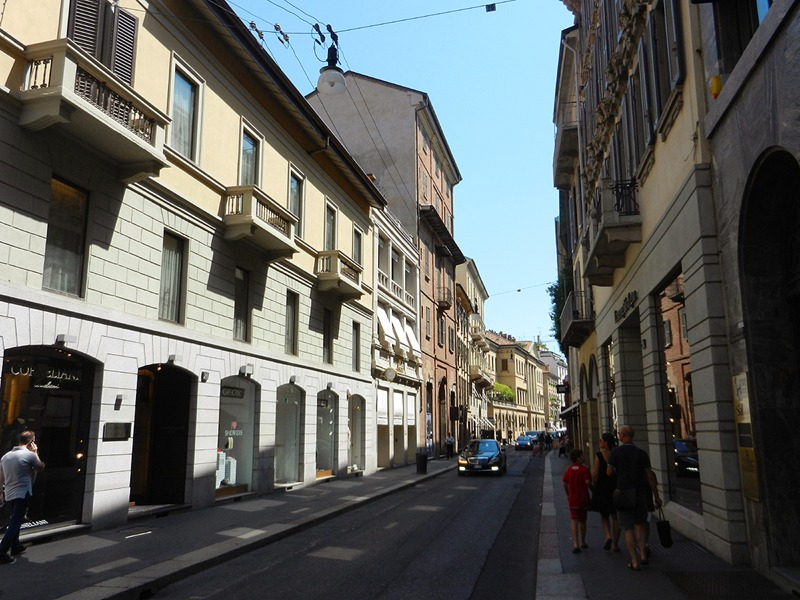
Via Monte Napoleone is Europe's most expensive street and the second-most-expensive street in the world after Fifth Avenue in New York City (2023).

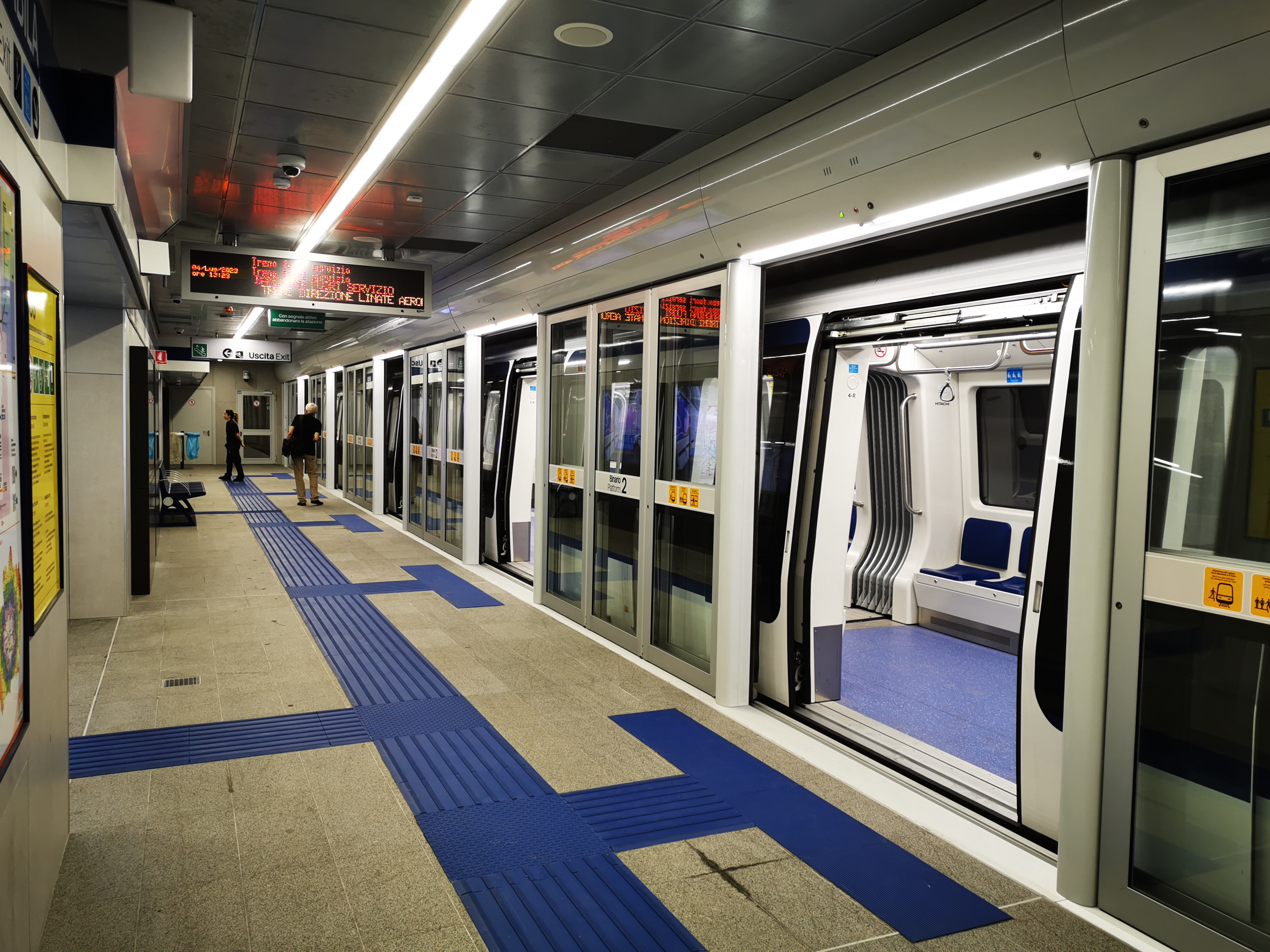
Milan Metro is the largest rapid transit system in Italy in terms of length, number of stations and ridership; and the fifth longest in the European Union and the eighth in the Europe.

The reconstruction of the city from the damage of the war took place quickly and on 11 May 1946 the restored Teatro alla Scala was inaugurated, rebuilt from the damage in just one year by the destruction caused by aerial bombing. The inaugural concert, which was directed by Arturo Toscanini who specially returned from his long American exile, psychologically marked the social imaginary of Italians, becoming a point of reference in the reconstruction, including psychological, of the nation.

Behind the Duomo the city's urban planning changed, taking advantage of the bombing ruins. Space was found to create Corso Europa and streamline city traffic. During this period, Milan was rapidly rebuilt, with the construction of several innovative and modernist skyscrapers, such as the Torre Velasca and the Pirelli Tower, that soon became the symbols of this new era of prosperity.

Monte Stella ("Starmount"), an artificial hill and surrounding city park in Milan, was created using the debris from the buildings that were bombed during World War II, as well as from the last remnants of the Spanish walls of the city, demolished in the mid 20th century. Even at only 25 m (82 ft) height, the hill provides a panoramic view of the city and hinterland, and in a clear day, the Alps and Apennines can be distinguished from atop. A notable area of the park is called "Giardino dei Giusti" (Garden of the Just), which is a memorial to distinguished opponents of genocide and crimes against humanity; each tree in the garden is dedicated to one such person. Notable people who have been dedicated a tree in the Giardino dei Giusti include Moshe Bejski, Andrej Sakharov, Svetlana Broz, and Pietro Kuciukian.

After the reconstruction, the "industrial triangle", that is, that highly industrialized area formed by Milan, Turin and Genoa, was the driving force behind the Italian economic miracle. It was during these years that the first natural gas field in Italy was discovered in the Po Valley. Due to this discovery, Eni, under the leadership of Enrico Mattei, was not dissolved as originally intended and began to play a decisive role in the economic growth of the country, then building its headquarters in Metanopoli (frazione of San Donato Milanese) at the southern border of Milan.

The new economic development caused a demographic growth in the city that saw a large internal immigration from southern Italy to Milan. The large industries managed to attract the laborers they needed also by posting posters in the towns of southern Italy offering them a bed in company housing for the time needed to settle in. The population grew from 1.3 million in 1951 to 1.7 million in 1967. In 1964, after seven years of construction work, the first section of the Milan Metro was inaugurated, part of what would become the Milan Metro Line 1. Line 2 opened five years later in 1969, Line 3 in 1990, Line 5 in 2013, and Line 4 in 2022.

The economic prosperity was, however, overshadowed in the late 1960s and early 1970s during the so-called Years of lead, when Milan witnessed an unprecedented wave of street violence, labour strikes and political terrorism. The apex of this period of turmoil occurred on 12 December 1969, when a bomb exploded at the National Agrarian Bank in Piazza Fontana, killing 17 people and injuring 88.

In the 1980s, with the international success of Milanese houses (like Armani, Prada, Versace, Moschino and Dolce & Gabbana), Milan became one of the world's fashion capitals. The city has hosted the Milan Fashion Week twice every year since 1975 (which previously took place in Florence), curated by the Camera Nazionale della Moda Italiana, based in Milan. Most of the shops of the most important Italian fashion houses and beyond are concentrated in the fashion district of Milan, the so-called "Quadrilatero della moda", i.e. via Monte Napoleone, via della Spiga, via Sant'Andrea, via Borgospesso, via Manzoni, via Santo Spirito, corso Venezia, corso Matteotti, via Bigli, via Senato and via Bagutta. Other shopping areas are the Galleria Vittorio Emanuele II, defined as "the oldest shopping center" in the world, Corso Buenos Aires, one of the longest shopping streets in Europe, Piazza del Duomo, Via Torino, Corso di Porta Ticinese, Via Vittorio Emanuele II, Piazza San Babila, Via Dante, Corso Vercelli and Corso Genova.

This period led the mass media to nickname the metropolis "Milano da bere", literally "Milan to be drunk", a journalistic expression that recalled the widespread well-being, the careerist and opulent rampantism flaunted by the emerging social classes and the "fashionable" image of the city. But in the 1990s Milan was badly affected by Tangentopoli, a political scandal in which many politicians and businessmen were tried for corruption. The city was also affected by a severe financial crisis and a steady decline in textiles, automobile and steel production. Berlusconi's Milano 2 and Milano 3 projects were the most important housing projects of the 1980s and 1990s in Milan and brought to the city new economical and social energy.

The city also saw a marked rise in international tourism, notably from the United States and Japan, while the stock exchange increased its market capitalisation more than five-fold. The city boasts several popular tourist attractions, such as the Milan Cathedral and Piazza del Duomo, the Teatro alla Scala, the San Siro Stadium, the Galleria Vittorio Emanuele II, the Castello Sforzesco, the Pinacoteca di Brera and the Via Montenapoleone. Most tourists visit sights such as Milan Cathedral, the Castello Sforzesco and the Teatro alla Scala; however, other main sights such as the Basilica di Sant'Ambrogio, the Navigli and the Brera district are less visited and prove to be less popular. The city also has numerous hotels, including the ultra-luxurious Town House Galleria, which is the world's first seven-star hotel according to Société Générale de Surveillance (five-star superior luxury according to state law, however) and one of The Leading Hotels of the World.

== 21st century ==
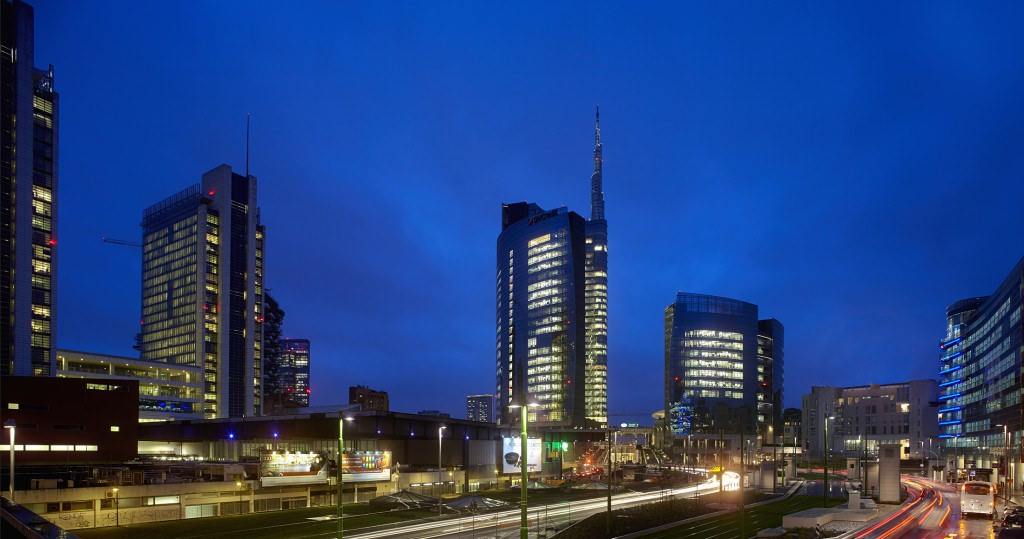
The skyscrapers of Porta Nuova business district

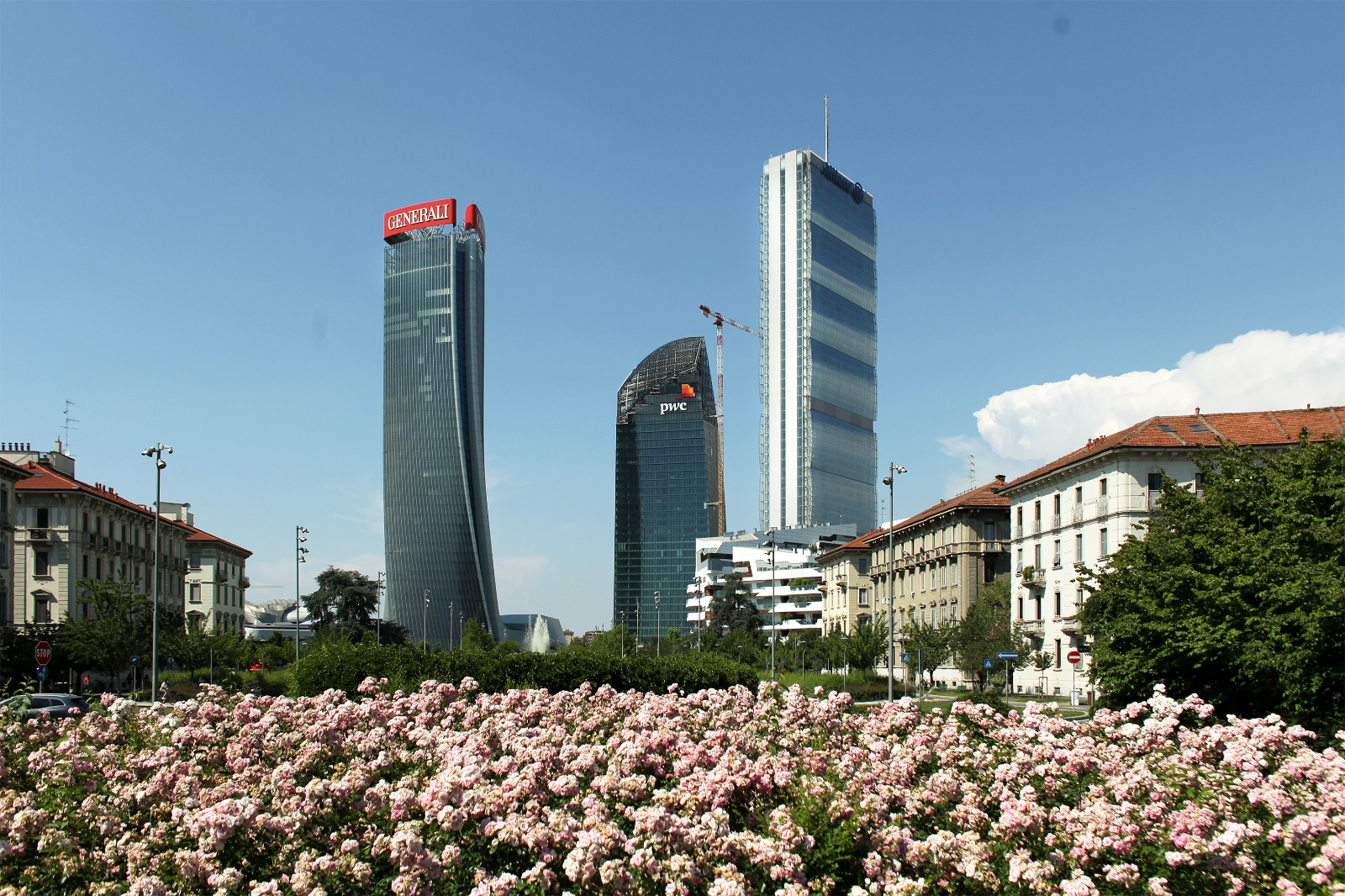
The skyscrapers of CityLife business district

On 8 October 2001, the city was shocked by the most serious plane crash in the history of Italy: at 08:10 local time a McDonnell Douglas MD-80 of the Scandinavian Airlines was taking off from Milan-Linate Airport, collided with a private Cessna Citation which, due to thick fog and difficult to read signs, had followed a different route from the one indicated by the control tower and had mistakenly entered the take-off runway. After the impact, the MD-87 crashed into the baggage depot located on the extension of the runway. The impact and the fire that subsequently broke out left no escape for all the occupants of both aircraft and for four of the five baggage sorters working in the depot. There were 118 victims that perished.

In the early 21st century, Milan underwent a series of sweeping redevelopments over huge former industrial areas. Two new business districts, Porta Nuova and CityLife, were built in the span of a decade, radically changing the skyline of the city. Porta Nuova has a 2017 city GDP of €400 billion, which makes it Europe's richest district within any city. A concentration of companies are based in Porta Nuova, with 4% of all institutions and conglomerates found in Italy, while Milan has 40% of all these business, and Milan's Lombardy region has 53% of it. The former industrial district of Bovisa was renovated with the transformation of the former industrial buildings into the second campus of the Polytechnic University of Milan, while the new University of Milano-Bicocca was built where the industrial complexes stood in the Bicocca district.

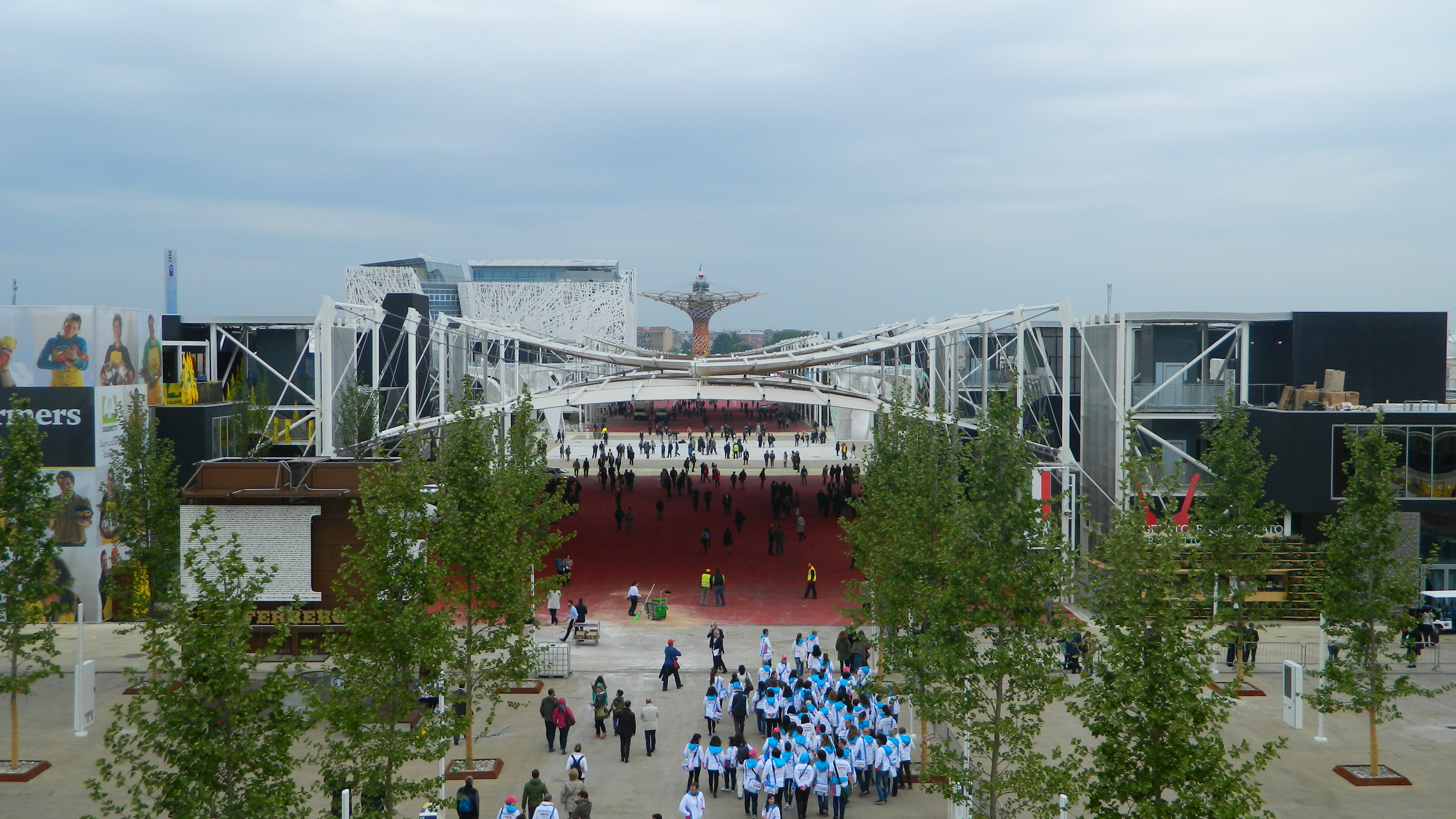
Expo 2015, which took place in Milan

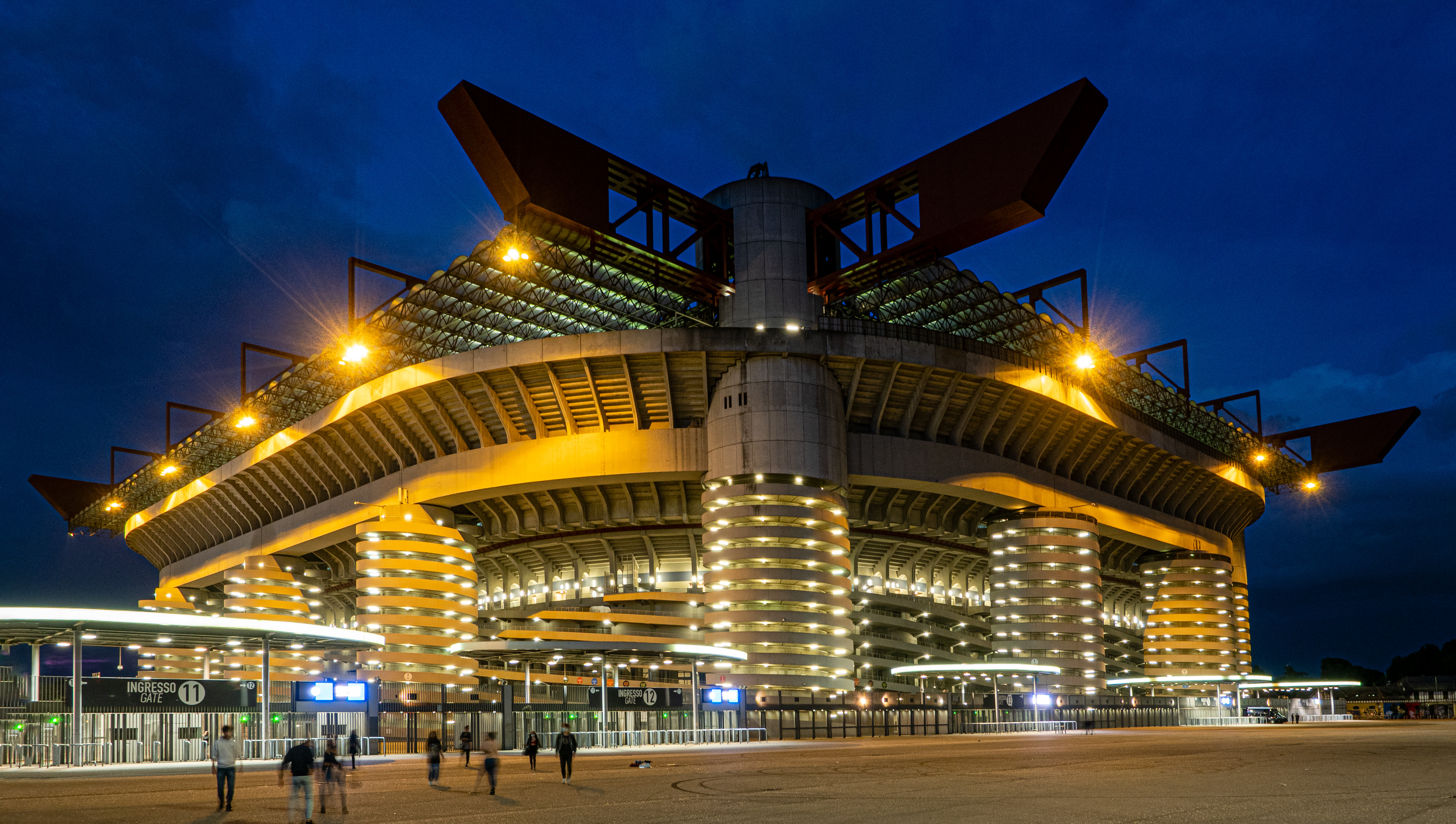
San Siro Stadium in Milan will also host the opening ceremony of the 2026 Winter Olympics of Milan and Cortina d'Ampezzo

Its exhibition centre moved to a much larger site. Opened in 2005, is a fairground complex designed by architect Massimiliano Fuksas, located in an area on the border between the towns of Rho and Pero replacing the former grounds which were developed into the new CityLife district of Milan. The Fiera Milano Rho location is mainly used for industrial trade shows. The firm is the most important trade fair organiser in Italy and the world's fourth largest. Fiera Milano mainly operates in the fields of management and organisation of exhibitions, trade fairs and conferences. It hosts about 70 shows (of which about one-third are directly organized) and 30,000 exhibitors every year.

The long decline in traditional manufacturing has been overshadowed by a great expansion of publishing, finance, banking, fashion design, information technology, logistics and tourism. The city's decades-long population decline seems to have partially reverted in recent years, as the comune gained about 100,000 new residents since the last census. The successful re-branding of the city as a global capital of innovation has been instrumental in its successful bids for hosting large international events such as Expo 2015 and 2026 Winter Olympics.

Expo 2015's theme was "Feeding the Planet, Energy for Life", encompassing technology, innovation, culture, traditions and creativity and how they relate to food and diet. The exposition developed themes introduced in earlier expos (such as water at Expo 2008 in Zaragoza) in light of new global scenarios and emerging issues, focusing on the right to healthy, secure and sufficient food for the world's inhabitants. Futuristic concerns about food security are compounded by forecasts of increasing uncertainty about the quantity of food which will be available globally. Expo 2015's concept was designed by a committee of four architects: Stefano Boeri, Richard Burdett, Mark Rylander and Jacques Herzog. The main idea was to trace two avenues (a main and a secondary avenue), representing the ancient Roman layout of a cardo and a decumanus.

2026 Winter Olympics will be the fourth Olympic Games hosted in Italy, which previously hosted the 2006 Winter Olympics in Turin, the 1956 Winter Olympics in Cortina d'Ampezzo and the 1960 Summer Olympics in Rome. It will be the first Olympic Games officially featuring multiple host cities and will be the first Winter Olympics since Sarajevo 1984 where the opening and closing ceremonies will be held in different venues. Events will also take place in seven other northeastern Italian cities. The games will mark the 20th anniversary of the Winter Olympics in Turin, the 70th anniversary of the Winter Olympics in Cortina d'Ampezzo and the first time that Milan will host an Olympic Games.

== See also ==
- Timeline of Milan
- History of architecture and art in Milan
- History of Italy
- History of Lombardy

== Bibliography ==
=== Published in the 16th-19th century ===
in English

- Jedidiah Morse; Richard C. Morse (1823), "Milan", A New Universal Gazetteer (4th ed.), New Haven: S. Converse
- David Brewster, ed. (1830). "Milan". Edinburgh Encyclopaedia. Edinburgh: William Blackwood.
- Josiah Conder (1834), "Milan", Italy, The Modern Traveller, vol. 31, London: J.Duncan
- Mariana Starke (1839), "Milan", Travels in Europe (9th ed.), Paris: A. and W. Galignani
- Valery (1842). "Milan". Italy and its Comforts. London: Longman.
- "Milan", Black's Guide to Italy, Edinburgh: Adam and Charles Black, 1869
- William Smith, ed. (1872) [1854]. "Mediolanum". Dictionary of Greek and Roman Geography. London: John Murray. hdl:2027/hvd.ah5cur.
- "Milan", Ballou's Monthly Magazine, Boston: Thomes & Talbot, February 1875, hdl:2027/nyp.33433081755823
- Fin Bec (August 1876), "Under Foreign Mahogany: Hotel Life in Milan", Gentleman's Magazine, London
- George Henry Townsend (1877), "Milan", A Manual of Dates (5th ed.), London: Frederick Warne & Co., hdl:2027/wu.89097349427
- "Milan", Cook's Tourist's Handbook for Northern Italy, London: T. Cook & Son, 1881
- J. Hardmeyer (1884), Milan, Illustrated Europe, Zurich: Orell Füssli & Co.
- W. Pembroke Fetridge (1884), "Milan", Harper's Hand-Book for Travellers in Europe and the East (23rd ed.), New York: Harper & Brothers, hdl:2027/nyp.33433066588363
- "Milan", Appleton's European Guide Book, New York: D. Appleton & Co., 1888
- "Milan", Bradshaw's Illustrated Hand-book to Italy, London: W.J. Adams & Sons, 1894
- "Milan", Hand-book for Travellers in Northern Italy (16th ed.), London: John Murray, 1897, OCLC 2231483

in other languages

- Corio, Bernardino (1554), L'historia di Milano (in Italian), Vinegia: Giovan Maria Bonelli, OL 22885135M
- Morigia, Paolo (1595), La nobiltà di Milano, Milan: Pontio; 2nd edn (1619) with additions by Girolamo Borsieri, Milan: Bidelli.
- Guide des étrangers à Milan et dans les environs de cette ville (in French), Milan: Pierre et Joseph Vallardi, 1819, OL 25596877M
- Pietro Verri (1850), Storia di Milano (in Italian), Milano: Oliva, OL 24138005M
- "Milano". Nuova Enciclopedia Italiana (in Italian) (6th ed.). Torino: Unione Tipografico-Editrice Torinese. 1887. hdl:2027/nnc1.cu08476810.

=== Published in the 20th century ===
in English

- George Charles Williamson (1901), "Milan", Cities of Northern Italy, New York: A. Wessels company, OCLC 6516634
- Cecilia M. Ady (1907), History of Milan under the Sforza, London: Methuen & Co., OCLC 4369439, OL 6994215M
- Milan, Mediaeval Towns, London: J.M. Dent & Co., 1908
- Brown, Horatio Robert Forbes; Ashby, Thomas (1910). "Milan" . Encyclopædia Britannica. Vol. 18 (11th ed.). pp. 437–441.
- Benjamin Vincent (1910), "Milan", Haydn's Dictionary of Dates (25th ed.), London: Ward, Lock & Co., hdl:2027/loc.ark:/13960/t89g6g776 – via HathiTrust
- "Milan", Northern Italy (14th ed.), Leipzig: Karl Baedeker, 1913 + 1870 ed.
- W.J. Rolfe (1914), "Milan", Satchel Guide for the Vacation Tourist in Europe, Boston: Houghton Mifflin, hdl:2027/mdp.39015065280888
- John Foot (1995). "The Family and the 'Economic Miracle': Social Transformation, Work, Leisure and Development at Bovisa and Comasina (Milan), 1950-70". Contemporary European History. 4 (3): 315–338. doi:10.1017/s0960777300003507. JSTOR 20081556. S2CID 145084971.
- Trudy Ring, ed. (1996). "Milan". Southern Europe. International Dictionary of Historic Places. Vol. 3. Fitzroy Dearborn. OCLC 31045650.
- John Foot (1999). "Television and the City: The Impact of Television in Milan, 1954-1960". Contemporary European History. 8 (3): 379–394. doi:10.1017/S0960777399003033. JSTOR 20081718. PMID 20120561. S2CID 35221104.
- Stefano D'Amico (2000). "Crisis and Transformation: Economic Organization and Social Structures in Milan, 1570-1610". Social History. 25 (1): 1–21. doi:10.1080/030710200363249. JSTOR 4286606. S2CID 145362967.

in Italian

- Francesco Malaguzzi Valeri (1906), Milano (in Italian), Bergamo: Istituto Italiano d'Arti Grafiche, OL 22335383M
- "Milano". Piemonte, Lombardia, Canton Ticino. Guida d'Italia (in Italian). Milan: Touring Club Italiano. 1916. p. 5+. hdl:2027/uiuo.ark:/13960/t1rf92c9w.
- Storia di Milano (in Italian). Fondazione Treccani. OCLC 461149469. 1953-1966 (17 volumes)
- Luigi Ganapini. Una città in guerra (Milano, 1939–1951) (Milan: Angeli, 1988)
- Achille Rastelli. Bombe sulla città. Gli attacchi aerei alleati: le vittime civili a Milano (Milan: Mursia, 2000)

=== Published in the 21st century ===
in English

- "History of Italy". HistoryWorld. p. 2.
- Lecco, Alberto; Foot, John (2020). "Milan Italy". Encyclopedia Britannica. Encyclopedia Britannica, Inc.
- Stefano D'Amico (2001). "Rebirth of a City: Immigration and Trade in Milan, 1630-59". The Sixteenth Century Journal. 32 (3): 697–721. doi:10.2307/2671508. JSTOR 2671508. PMID 18939327.
- Anna Trono; Maria Chiara Zerbi (2002). "Milan: The city of constant renewal". GeoJournal. 58 (1): 65. Bibcode:2002GeoJo..58...65T. doi:10.1023/B:GEJO.0000006569.84532.7d.
- Elisabetta Merlo; Francesca Polese (2006). "Turning Fashion into Business: The Emergence of Milan as an International Fashion Hub". Business History Review. 80 (3): 415–447. doi:10.1017/S0007680500035856. JSTOR 25097225. S2CID 156857344.
- ""Venice and Northern Italy, 1400–1600 A.D." Heilbrunn Timeline of Art History". The Met. The Metropolitan Museum of Art. 2019.
- "Insider's Guide to Milan", Wall Street Journal, 2 October 2010
- "You Know You're a Milan Insider When". New York Times. 15 October 2010.
- Chris Wickham (2015). "Milan". Sleepwalking into a New World: The Emergence of Italian City Communes in the Twelfth Century. Princeton University Press. pp. 21–66. ISBN 978-1-4008-6582-6.
