= 1277 =

1277 in various calendars
- Gregorian calendar: 1277; MCCLXXVII
- Ab urbe condita: 2030
- Armenian calendar: 726; ԹՎ ՉԻԶ
- Assyrian calendar: 6027
- Balinese saka calendar: 1198–1199
- Bengali calendar: 683–684
- Berber calendar: 2227
- English Regnal year: 5 Edw. 1 – 6 Edw. 1
- Buddhist calendar: 1821
- Burmese calendar: 639
- Byzantine calendar: 6785–6786
- Chinese calendar: 丙子年 (Fire Rat); 3974 or 3767 — to — 丁丑年 (Fire Ox); 3975 or 3768
- Coptic calendar: 993–994
- Discordian calendar: 2443
- Ethiopian calendar: 1269–1270
- Hebrew calendar: 5037–5038
- Hindu calendars
- Vikram Samvat: 1333–1334
- Shaka Samvat: 1198–1199
- Kali Yuga: 4377–4378
- Holocene calendar: 11277
- Igbo calendar: 277–278
- Iranian calendar: 655–656
- Islamic calendar: 675–676
- Japanese calendar: Kenji 3 (建治３年)
- Javanese calendar: 1187–1188
- Julian calendar: 1277; MCCLXXVII
- Korean calendar: 3610
- Minguo calendar: 635 before ROC 民前635年
- Nanakshahi calendar: −191
- Thai solar calendar: 1819–1820
- Tibetan calendar: མེ་ཕོ་བྱི་བ་ལོ་ (male Fire-Rat); 1403 or 1022 or 250 — to — མེ་མོ་གླང་ལོ་ (female Fire-Ox); 1404 or 1023 or 251

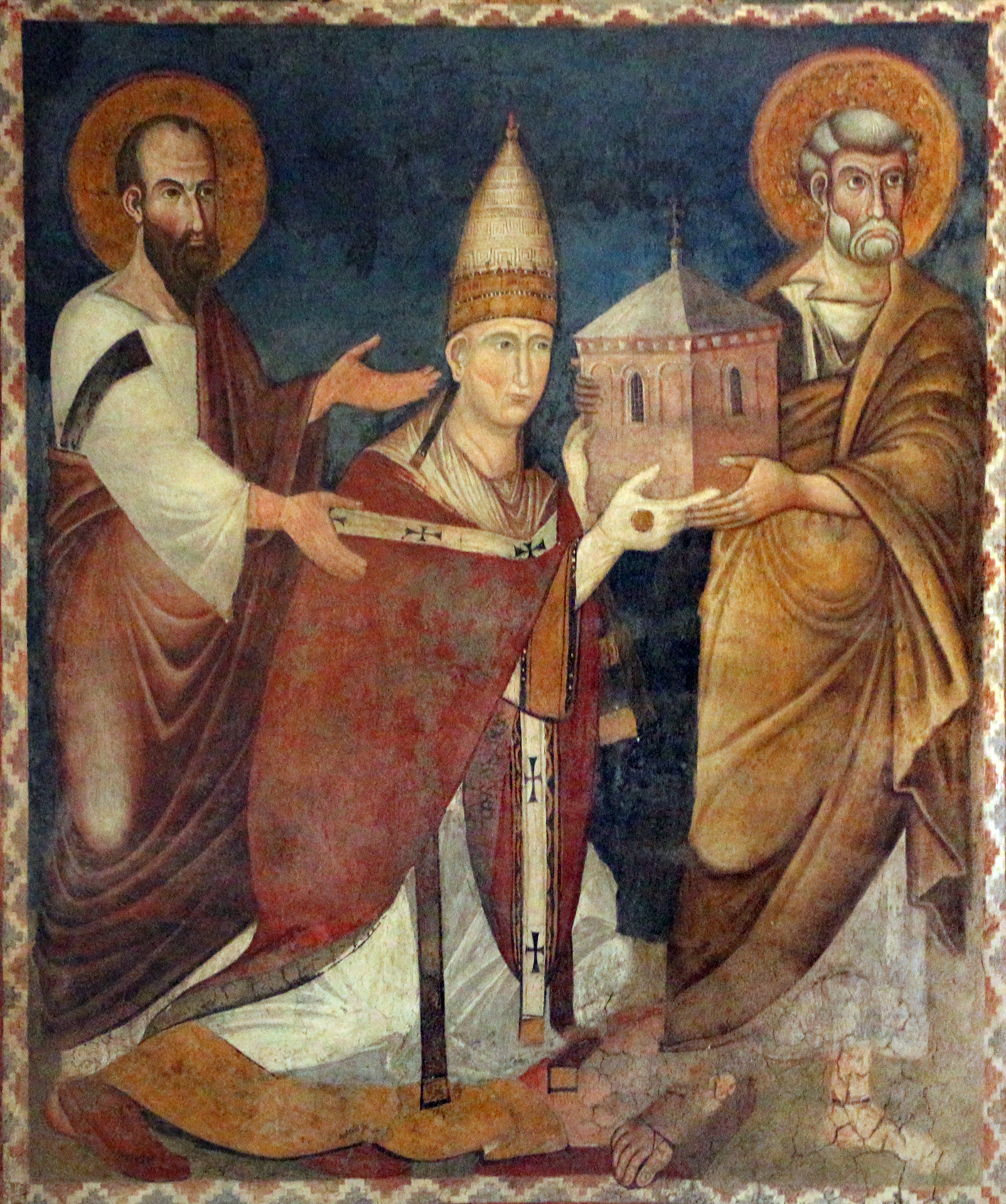
Pope Nicholas III (middle) offering the church to Christ (fresco 13th century).

Year 1277 (MCCLXXVII) was a common year starting on Friday of the Julian calendar.

== Events ==
=== By place ===
==== Byzantine Empire ====
- March 19 – Byzantine–Venetian Treaty: Emperor Michael VIII Palaiologos concludes an agreement with the Republic of Venice. Stipulating a two-year truce, and renewing Venetian commercial privileges in the Byzantine Empire. Michael keeps the Venetians and their fleet from participating in the attempts of Charles I, king of Sicily, to organize an anti-Byzantine crusade, while the Venetians can retain their access to the Byzantine market.
- Summer – Uprising of Ivaylo: An uprising under Ivaylo breaks out in northeastern Bulgaria against the failure of Emperor Konstantin Tih to cope with the constant Mongol invasions which have devastated the country for years. Ivaylo confronts and defeats the plundering Mongols, and by autumn all Mongols are driven out of Bulgarian territory. In return, Konstantin gathers a small army and tries unsuccessfully to suppress the revolt but is himself killed in battle.
- Late – Battle of Pharsalus: Michael VIII sends a Byzantine expeditionary army under John Synadenos to invade Thessaly. The Byzantines are ambushed and defeated by Greek forces under John I Doukas, Latin ruler of Thessaly, near (Old) Pharsalus. During the battle, Synadenos is captured and Michael Kaballarios, commander of the Latin mercenaries, dies shortly afterward of his wounds.

==== Europe ====
- January 21 – Battle of Desio: Lombard forces under Archbishop Ottone Visconti defeat the Della Torre family troops for the rule of Milan. Later, Ottone enters the city in triumph, and imprisons Napoleone della Torre in the Castello Baradello at Como (Northern Italy).
- February – The Duke of Wrocław Henry IV Probus is kidnapped from his estates in Jelcz, and moved to Legnica by Bolesław II the Horned.
- March – Siger of Brabant, Dutch teacher and philosopher, is condemned by the French Inquisition for his advocacy of the Averroist doctrine that reason is separate from Christian faith.
- March 18 – Charles I, king of Sicily, buys the title to the Kingdom of Jerusalem from Maria of Antioch, for 1,000 bezants and an annual payment of 4,000 livres tournois.
- May 12 – Mehmet I of Karaman, Seljuk vizier, issues a firman (decree) ordering the Turkish language to be used, instead of Arabic or Persian in government offices.
- August – Marinid forces led by Sultan Abu Yusuf cross the Strait of Gibraltar and marches north, ravaging the districts of Jerez de la Frontera, Seville and Córdoba.

==== Britain ====
- November 10 – Treaty of Aberconwy: Prince Llywelyn ap Gruffudd and King Edward I of England sign a peace treaty which leaves Llywelyn only with the western part of Gwynedd.
- Roger Bacon, Franciscan friar and University of Oxford lecturer, is arrested for spreading anti-Church views; specifically, the Church's stance on Greek philosopher Galen.

==== Levant ====
- April 15 – Battle of Elbistan: A Mamluk army (some 14,000 men) under Sultan Baibars marches from Syria into the Mongol-dominated Sultanate of Rum and attacks the Mongol occupation force at Elbistan. Baibars, with at least 10,000 horsemen, defeats and overwhelms the Mongol forces. After the battle, he marches unopposed to Kayseri in the heart of Anatolia in triumph and enters the city on April 23.

==== Asia ====
- Battle of Ngasaunggyan: A Burmese army (some 80,000 men) led by King Narathihapate (or Sithu IV) invades Mongol territory in Yunnan. The invasion is repelled by the Mongol forces, who counterattack, reaching as far south as the fortress city of Kaungsin ("Gold Teeth"), which guards the Bhamo Pass in northern Myanmar. Later, the Burmese Pagan Empire begins to disintegrate after several Mongol invasions under Kublai Khan.
- Migration of the (Southern) Song dynasty: Some 50,000 citizens of the Song dynasty in China become the first recorded inhabitants of Macau, as they seek refuge from the invading armies of the Yuan dynasty. They also stay for a short period in (New) Kowloon.
- In Japan, a 20 kilometer stone wall defending the coast of Hakata Bay at Fukuoka on the island of Kyushu is completed; it is built in response to the attempted Yuan dynasty Mongol invasion of Japan in 1274.

=== By topic ===
==== Religion ====
- March 7 – Condemnation of 1277: Pope John XXI instructs Étienne Tempier, bishop of Paris, to investigate the complaints of theologians in France. By order 219 propositions of philosophical and theological doctrines such as Averroism are prohibited from discussion in the University of Paris, under a decree promulgated by Tempier.
- April – John XXI sends a papal embassy to Constantinople to force Michael VIII Palaiologos, his 18-year-old son and heir Andronikos and Patriarch John XI Bekkos to reaffirm their allegiance to the Union of Lyon in the Palace of Blachernae. Michael refuses to accept a religious union of the Greek Orthodox Church with Rome.
- May 20 – John XXI dies after an 8-month pontificate at Viterbo. He is succeeded by Nicholas III as the 188th pope of the Catholic Church (until 1280).

== Births ==
- January 7 – Kanzan Egen, Japanese monk (d. 1360)
- January 21 – Galeazzo I Visconti, Italian nobleman (d. 1328)
- March 26 – Christina Ebner, German mystic (d. 1356)
- April 17 – Michael IX Palaiologos, Byzantine emperor (d. 1320)
- Akamatsu Norimura, Japanese governor (shugo) (d. 1350)
- Bernard V, German bishop (House of Lippe) d. 1341)
- George I Šubić of Bribir, Croatian nobleman (d. 1302)
- Gerhard IV, German nobleman and knight (d. 1323)
- Ingeborg Magnusdotter Swedish princess, queen consort of Denmark (d. 1319)
- Isabella of Mar, Scottish noblewoman, wife of Robert the Bruce (d. 1296)
- Martha of Denmark, queen consort of Sweden (d. 1341)
- Meihō Sotetsu, Japanese Zen Buddhist monk (d. 1350)
- Smbat I Hetumian (or Sempad), king of Cilician Armenia (d. 1310)
- Wei Yilin, Chinese physician and surgeon (d. 1347)

== Deaths ==
- January/March – Philip of Sicily, king of Sardinia (House of Anjou)
- January 12 – Philippe de Toucy, French nobleman
- January 17 – Chen Wenlong, Chinese general (b. 1232)
- February 14 – Ulrich von Güttingen, German abbot
- February – Simone Paltanieri, Italian archpriest and cardinal
- April – Joachim Gutkeled, Hungarian nobleman and knight
- May 1 – Stefan Uroš I ("the Great"'), king of Serbia
- May 14 – Nicholas I of Werle, German nobleman
- May 20 – John XXI, pope of the Catholic Church
- June 20 (or May 1279) – Shams al-Din Mehmed of Karaman, Seljuk nobleman and vizier
- July 1 – Baibars (or Abu al-Futuh), Mamluk sultan
- July 14 – Humbert of Romans, French friar and writer
- August 2 – Mu'in al-Din Parwana, Seljuk statesman
- September 29 – Balian of Arsuf, Cypriot nobleman
- October 17 – Beatrice of Falkenburg, German queen consort
- October 26 – Mastino I della Scala, Italian nobleman
- October 27 – Walter de Merton, bishop of Rochester
- December 21 – Al-Nawawi, Seljuk scholar (b. 1233)
- December 13 – John I, German nobleman (b. 1242)
- Konstantin Tih, Bulgarian nobleman and ruler, killed in revolt
- Folke Johansson Ängel ("Angelus"'), Swedish archbishop
- Frederick II, German nobleman (House of Isenburg)
- Frederick of Castile, Spanish prince (infante), executed (b. 1223)
- Guo Kan, Chinese general and politician (b. 1217)
- Jacopo da Leona, Italian secretary, jurist and poet
- Licoricia of Winchester, English Jewish businesswoman, murdered
- Madog II ap Gruffydd, Lord of Dinas Bran, Welsh prince and nobleman, killed in battle
- Muhammad I al-Mustansir, Hafsid sultan and writer
- Muhaqqiq al-Hilli, Persian scholar, poet and writer
- Paolo Navigajoso, Venetian nobleman (megadux), ruler of Lemnos, killed in battle
- Savakanmaindan, Malayan ruler of Tambralinga
- Squarcino Borri (or Scarsini), Italian condottiero
- Ulrich of Strasburg, German monk and theologian
- William of Saliceto, Italian scholar and surgeon
