= Squarcino Borri =

Italian nobleman (1230–1277)

Squarcino Borri, also called Scarsini (1230–1277), was an Italian condottiero and lord of the lands of Santo Stefano Ticino.

== Biography ==
Born in Santo Stefano Ticino in 1230, Squarcino was the son of Lanfranco of Borri (end of 12th – early 13th century), the local feudal lord of the city of Santo Stefano Ticino. The Borri family was one of the most respected in Milan, and a late tradition, with no historical basis, associates saint Monas of Milan, Bishop of Milan, with the Borris. Even in his youth, Squarcino (unlike his father) undertook a military career and placed himself at the head of the noble exiles from Milan after the Torriani family took power in that city. He remained a faithful supporter of the Visconti family, and distinguished himself as a captain in the service of Ottone Visconti in the famous Battle of Desio in January 1277.

In 1254, he married Antonia (1236–?), of an unknown lineage, and they had a daughter, Bonacossa Borri, who in 1269 married Matteo I Visconti, a future Lord of Milan. At the same time, the family Borri were reconfirmed in their feudal rights over their lands, and the same Squarcino also became lord of the lands of Castellazzo de' Stampi in Corbetta in 1275. He remained in office until his death, in Invorio, in 1277.

== See also ==
- Corbetta, Lombardy
