= Corrado della Torre =

Italian politician and condottiero

Corrado della Torre, also called Mosca (c. 1251 – 24 October 1307) was an Italian medieval politician and condottiero, a member of the Torriani family.

== Biography ==
Corrado was the son of Napo della Torre and Marguerite of Baux, a Provençal noblewoman. Around 1266 he was podestà of Mantua and in 1277 he took part in the battle of Desio, in which he was captured and imprisoned in the Castello Baradello, near Como, together with his father and brothers. Napo died there in 1278, while Corrado and his brother were later able to escape. He became governor of Istria in 1277–1278 and 1293–1297, and, in 1293, podestà of Trieste, all under the aegis of his uncle Raimondo, then patriarch of Aquileia. In 1284–1285 he took part in the defence of Trieste, besieged by the Venetians. In 1289 he fought against Asti alongside William VII of Montferrat.

In 1302 he participated in the anti-Visconti alliance which forced Matteo Visconti to leave Milan, which was returned to the della Torre. In 1305 he led an expedition against Matteo in Brescia, defeating him. Two years later, Visconti set a plot to kill Corrado and his cousin Guido, but the attempt failed; Corrado died in October 1307, at Milan. He was buried in the church of San Francesco Grande.

Among his sons, Cassone (or Gastone) was Archbishop of Milan from 1308 to 1316 and patriarch of Aquileia from 1317 to 1318.

== Sources ==
- Page at the Dizionario biografico degli Italiani (in Italian)
