= Lodovico della Torre =

Lodovico della Torre (died July 30, 1365) was Patriarch of Aquileia from 1359 until 1365.

== Biography ==
His family had included several patriarchs of Aquileia: his great-uncle Raimondo della Torre (1273–1299), and his distant cousins Pagano (1319–1332) and Cassono (1316–1318).

Lodovico started his career as a canon in Aquileia. He was then subsequently bishop of Trieste, Olena and Coron in Greece, where he had been transferred in 1357. Between 1340 and 1350, he stayed for a while at the papal court in Avignon. He was again in Avignon when he was appointed patriarch of Aquileia on 10 May 1359. A certain Benvenuto of Udine tried to prevent the appointment, claiming that the family della Torre had taken part in the murder of Patriarch Bertram of St. Genesius. He was not successful, but Lodovico seemed to have had many enemies in the patriarchate before he arrived there.

One of his competitors, Pileo di Prata, was the candidate of the lord of Padua, Francesco I da Carrara. The second competitor, Paul Praunspeck von Jägendorf, was the candidate of the Hungarian king Louis I. Against all these powers, Lodovico had to fight very hard to be appointed, but with Pope Innocent VI's support, he succeeded.

The new patriarch established diplomatic contacts inside and outside the Patriarchate. After a long time of peace, Rudolf of Habsburg planned in July 1361 to attack Aquileia. He made an alliance with the emperor Charles IV and declared war. Aquileia was conquered very fast, almost without fighting, and a peace contract was signed on 12 September 1361. Lodovico was forced to travel to Vienna together with Rudolf's brother Frederick. Two other hostages accompanied the Patriarch: Francesco di Savorgnano and Simone di Valvasone. They managed to flee at the end of January 1362. Count Rudolf arrived in Vienna in February 1362. His territorial claims were immense and meant a total isolation for Aquileia. Political changes brought a slight modification of Rudolf's claims in favour of Aquileia. A treaty was signed on 21 April 1362, and Lodovico was set free. When he returned, he realised that his enemies, as for example, the family di Spilimbergo, had gained strength. In September 1363, Habsburg troops invaded the Patriarchate again. Because of a new alliance against the Habsburg power, Charles IV was interested in supporting Aquileia. There was yet another reason – the emperor was planning a channel between the Danube and the Vltava in order to simplify trade between Venice and Prague.

After a long time of hesitation, Rudolf declared war again in June 1365. During the military preparation, Rudolf died on 27 July 1365, in Milan. Three days later, on 30 July, Lodovico died in the castle of Soffumbergo after a short sickness. The general confusion was enormous. The Venetian Republic and the Pope spoke up for peace. There were just some skirmishes, and the patriarchate gained the upper hand. With the appointment of the next Patriarch, Marquard of Randeck, the emperor’s candidate, the situation was stabilised.

== Sources ==
- Bianchi, G. (1877). Documenti per la storia del Friuli dal 1200 al 1400. Tip. J.E. Colmegna.
- Guerra. Otium Foriiulii. Manoscritti. Museo Archeologico, Cividale.
- Tirelli, R. (2000). I patriarchi. La spada e la croce XV secoli di storia. Pordenone.

Preceded by Nicolaus of Luxemburg	Patriarch of Aquileia; 1359–1365	Succeeded by Marquard of Randeck
