= 1309 =

1309 in various calendars
- Gregorian calendar: 1309; MCCCIX
- Ab urbe condita: 2062
- Armenian calendar: 758; ԹՎ ՉԾԸ
- Assyrian calendar: 6059
- Balinese saka calendar: 1230–1231
- Bengali calendar: 715–716
- Berber calendar: 2259
- English Regnal year: 2 Edw. 2 – 3 Edw. 2
- Buddhist calendar: 1853
- Burmese calendar: 671
- Byzantine calendar: 6817–6818
- Chinese calendar: 戊申年 (Earth Monkey); 4006 or 3799 — to — 己酉年 (Earth Rooster); 4007 or 3800
- Coptic calendar: 1025–1026
- Discordian calendar: 2475
- Ethiopian calendar: 1301–1302
- Hebrew calendar: 5069–5070
- Hindu calendars
- Vikram Samvat: 1365–1366
- Shaka Samvat: 1230–1231
- Kali Yuga: 4409–4410
- Holocene calendar: 11309
- Igbo calendar: 309–310
- Iranian calendar: 687–688
- Islamic calendar: 708–709
- Japanese calendar: Enkyō 2 (延慶２年)
- Javanese calendar: 1220–1221
- Julian calendar: 1309; MCCCIX
- Korean calendar: 3642
- Minguo calendar: 603 before ROC 民前603年
- Nanakshahi calendar: −159
- Thai solar calendar: 1851–1852
- Tibetan calendar: ས་ཕོ་སྤྲེ་ལོ་ (male Earth-Monkey); 1435 or 1054 or 282 — to — ས་མོ་བྱ་ལོ་ (female Earth-Bird); 1436 or 1055 or 283

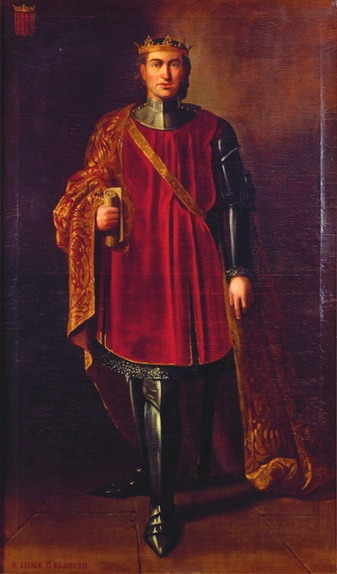
King James II (the Just) (1267–1327)

Year 1309 (MCCCIX) was a common year starting on Wednesday of the Julian calendar.

== Events ==
=== January – March ===
- January 6 – The coronation of Henry of Luxemburg as "King of the Romans", the person first-in-line to succeed the Holy Roman Emperor, takes place at Aachen (now in Germany). He will become the Emperor in 1312.
- February 2 – At Avignon, Pope Clement V begins the investigation and posthumous trial of the late Pope Boniface VIII, who was accused of heresy and sodomy after his death in 1303, in papers circulated by Guillaume de Nogaret.
- February 15 – King Denis of Portugal grants the Magna Charta Privilegioum, charter for Portugal's first university, now the University of Coimbra. Joseph M. M. Hermans and Marc Nelissen, Charters of Foundation and Early Documents of the Universities of the Coimbra Group (Leuven University Press, 2005) p. 38.
- February 24 – In Spain, King Ferdinand IV of Castile agrees to assist the neighboring Crown of Aragon (led by King, King Jaume II, to wage war against the Islamic Emirate of Granada.
- March 9 – Pope Clement V officially transfers the headquarters of the Roman Catholic Pontiff from Rome to the French city of Avignon, his residence and at this time part of the Kingdom of Arles, starting the Avignon Papacy. Since 1305, the papal court had been at Poitiers, and the move is justified by violence in Rome. The papal seat becomes part of the Holy Roman Empire, and its absence from Rome is referred to as the "Babylonian captivity of the Papacy".
- March 14 – (1 Shawwal 708 AH) Sultan Muhammad III is deposed during a palace coup after a 7-year reign, and is replaced by his half-brother Abu al-Juyush Nasr, as ruler of the Emirate of Granada. Muhammad III is spared and allowed to live in Almuñécar, but his vizier, Abu Abdallah ibn al-Hakim, is killed.

=== April – June ===
- April 24 – Spanish kings James II of Aragon and Ferdinand IV of Castile persuade Pope Clement V to grant the papal bull Indesinentis cure, authorizing them approval and church financial support for a crusade to rid the Iberian peninsula of Islam, as well as to conquer Corsica and Sardinia. The two monarchs fail to mention their collaboration with the Muslim Marinid Empire, and use the papal bull to plan a blockade of the Strait of Gibraltar with their combined fleet of 40 warships on their mission to expel the Saracen forces from Spain.
- April 29 – Pope Clement V issues the papal bull Prioribus decanis granting King Ferdinand IV 1/10th of clergy taxes collected in Castile, in order to finance the war against Granada.
- April – After his ascent to the throne, the Emir Nasr ad-Din Muhammad of Granada sends envoys to the Marinid court at Fez, in Morocco.
- May 5 – Robert the Wise becomes the new King of Naples upon the death of his father, Charles the Lame.
- May 12 – Marinid Sultan Abu al-Rabi Sulayman launches an attack on Ceuta. He concludes an alliance with King James II of Castile, and concedes commercial benefits to Castilian merchants. Abu al-Rabi also sends 1,000 measures of wheat to Aragon. A few months later, Marinid forces, without Castilian support, occupy Ceuta and expel Saracen forces from Morocco.
- June 15 – The second coronation of Charles I as King of Hungary takes place at Székesfehérvár after a first attempt in 1301 was not recognized.

=== July – September ===
- July 3 – Portugal joins forces with the kingdoms of Castile and Aragon in their attack on Gibraltar.
- July 18 – King James II of Aragon and his navy depart from Valencia on their expedition to begin the Siege of Almería.
- July 21 – The north African territory of Ceuta, controlled by the Emirate of Granada, is conquered by a fleet of ships, led by Eimeric de Bellveí, from the Kingdom of Aragon.
- July 30 – (21 Safar 709 A.H.) Siege of Algeciras: Castilian forces led by Ferdinand IV "the Summoned"") begin the siege of Algeciras, capital of the Emirate of Granada. King Denis I of Portugal ("the Poet King") sends a contingent of 700 knights to support the siege. He provides Ferdinand, in accordance with his friendship, a loan of 16,600 silver marks.
- August 11 – Siege of Almería: Aragonese forces (some 12,000 men) under King James II of Aragon ("James the Just") land on the coast of Almería and begin blockading the city with his fleet. His forces include siege engines such as mangonels and trebuchets. James orders multiple unsuccessful assaults on the city and is forced (due to a shortage of supplies) to make a truce in December.
- August 15 – Conquest of Rhodes: The Byzantine garrison of the city of Rhodes surrenders to the Crusader forces of the Knights Hospitaller under Grand Master Foulques de Villaret – completing their conquest of Rhodes. The knights establish their headquarters on the island and rename themselves as the Knights of Rhodes.
- August 23 – A relief force from the Emirate of Granada attempts to drive out the Kingdom of Aragon forces at Almeria, but loses thousands of men.
- September 12 – Siege of Gibraltar: Castilian forces under Juan Núñez II de Lara and Alonso Pérez de Guzmán besiege and conquer the Saracen fortress at Gibraltar, which had been held by them for nearly 600 years (since the year 711). During the siege, the port is blockaded. Ferdinand IV of Castile orders repairs of the damaged city walls.

=== October – December ===
- October 1 – In Italy, the Archbishop of Milan, Cassone della Torre, is imprisoned by troops sent by his cousin Guido della Torre to attack the archbishop's palace.
- October 18
  - At Avignon, Pope Clement V signs a mandate consenting "for any persons who wanted to proceed against the memory of Boniface VIII to proceed" and sends it to the Bishop of Paris for the posthumous trial of Boniface for heresy.
  - King Edward II summons a council to meet at York, but several nobles (the earls of Lancaster, Lincoln, Warwick, Oxford and Arundel) refuse to attend due to Piers Gaveston's attendance. Since he returned from exile, Gaveston tries to alienate the nobles from the king.
- October 20 – In what is now central Myanmar, the coronation of Thihathu as the monarch of the Myinsaing Kingdom takes place.
- October 22 – The trial of the Knights Templar arrested in England begins and will continue for the next five months, ending on March 18, 1310.
- October 29 – Archbishop Cassone della Torre of Milan is exiled to Bologna by his cousin Guido, who is later excommunicated.
- October 31 – In India, Alauddin Khalji, Sultan of Delhi, orders General Malik Kafur to invade the Kakatiya kingdom, ruled by Prataparudra, and to besiege its capital, Warangal (now in India's Telangana state).
- October – About 500 knights led by John of Castile, Lord of Valencia de Campos, uncle of King James II of Castile, desert the Castilian encampment during the Siege of Algeciras because they are not getting paid and because one-sixth of Granada will be ceded to the Kingdom of Aragon. King Ferdinand of Aragon continues the siege.
- November 4 – Pope Clement V declares that Knights Hospitaller will not be sent to the Holy Land and Jerusalem, and that they will be limited to defending the Mediterranean Sea including Cyprus and Rhodes.
- November 13 – After a layover in Masudspur, the Delhi Sultanate Army of General Kafur resumes its march toward Warangal, stopping at Sultanpur on November 19, at Khandar on December 5 and at Nikanth on December 27.
- November 19 – Pope Clement V reverses the excommunication of Flemish hero Willem van Saeftinghe and grants him absolution, but requires him to join the Knights Hospitaller in their crusade at the island of Rhodes.
- December 18 – In Spain, three months after the September 19 death of Alonso Pérez de Guzmán, Fernando Ponce de León is made the new ruler of Marchena, as well as Bornos, Espera, Rota and Chipiona by King Ferdinand IV of Castile.

=== By place ===
==== England ====
- Alnwick Castle in Northumberland is bought by the House of Percy, later Earls of Northumberland.

==== Cities and Towns ====
- The village of Lukáčovce in Slovakia first appears in the historical records.

== Births ==
- March 25 – Robert de Ferrers, English nobleman and knight (d. 1350)
- June 9 – Rupert I, German nobleman and count palatine (d. 1390)
- December 6 – Humphrey de Bohun, English nobleman (d. 1361)
- probable – Aldona of Lithuania (or "Anna"), queen consort of Poland (d. 1339)
- Conrad of Megenberg, German scholar and scientist (d. 1374)

== Deaths ==
- January 4 – Angela of Foligno, Italian nun, mystic and writer (b. 1248)
- February 9 – Nanpo Shōmyō, Japanese monk and priest (b. 1235)
- March 7 – Lovato Lovati, Italian scholar, judge and writer (b. 1241)
- April 10 (probable) – Elisabeth von Rapperswil, Swiss noblewoman (b. 1251)
- May 5 – King Charles II "the Lame" of Naples), son of Charles I of Anjou (b. 1254)
- May 19 – Agostino Novello, Italian priest and prior general (b. 1240)
- July 13 – John I, Dutch nobleman and bishop (House of Nassau)
- July 16 – James Stewart, Scottish nobleman and knight (b. 1260)
- August 10 – Giovanni Boccamazza, Italian cardinal and archbishop
- September 19 – Alonso Pérez de Guzmán, Spanish nobleman (b. 1256)
- October 6 – Frederick VII, German nobleman (House of Hohenzollern)
- October 18 – Tettsū Gikai, Japanese monk and Zen Master (b. 1219)
