= Guido della Torre =

Lord of Milan (1302–1312)

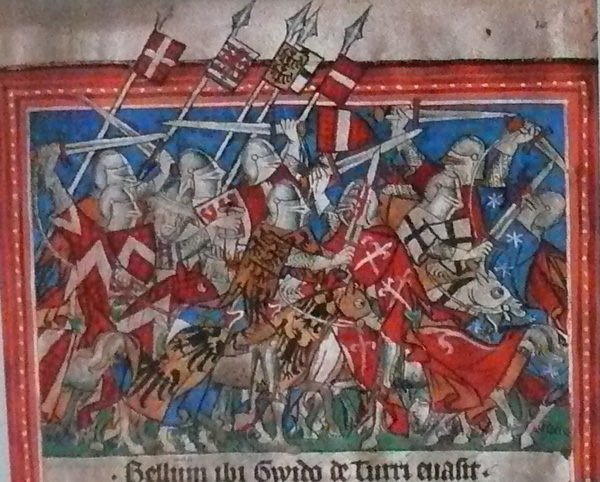
The knights of Henry VII defeat the Torriani revolt, 12 February 1311.

Guido della Torre (27 September 1259 – summer 1312) was a Lord of Milan between 1302 and 1312.

== Early life ==
He was the son of Francesco della Torre (brother of Napoleone della Torre), Podestà of Novara (d. 1277) and his wife, Giulia, daughter of Corrado Castiglioni, Podestà di Tortona and Isola Lampugnani.

== Biography ==
As part of the factional turmoil between the Guelphs and Ghibellines, the conflict of Guido’s Guelph family with the Ghibelline Visconti, led by Ottone Visconti, dominated much of his childhood. In 1277, after the Battle of Desio, in which he lost his father, he was taken prisoner with his uncle Napoleone, and imprisoned in the castle of Baradello at Como. He escaped from this castle in 1284, with the help of Loterio Rusca, the Lord of Como and William VII, Marquess of Montferrat. He fled with his uncle Raimondo della Torre, who was the Patriarch of Aquileia. In 1287 Guido became Podestà of Treviso.

After he escaped from the castle Baradello, Guido led the Guelphs in the riots that took place in Milan in the last years of the thirteenth century. In 1302, a group of Guelphs, including the Lords of Piacenza and Parma, Alberto Scotti and Ghiberto da Correggio, compelled the Visconti to leave Milan. After twenty-five years of exile, Guido della Torre and his family regained their power in Milan.

Being the head of the della Torre family helped Guido in his election to Milan’s Captain of the People in 1307. The following year Milan elected him as a perpetual capitano del popolo. However, in 1311 Guido entered in conflict with his cousin Cassone della Torre, archbishop of Milan: after an unsuccessful revolt against king Henry VII, he was forced to flee, first to Lodi, then to Cremona where Guido died in the summer of 1312.

== Marriages and issue ==
Guido sought to forge new alliances through marriages: He married firstly in 1276 to Beatrice Guidi (d. 1302), the daughter of Simon Guidi, Count of Batifolle. After her death, he married Brunissenda Langosco, the daughter of Filippo Langosco, Count Palatine of Lomello; his eldest son, Amurat, married Margherita di Ceva, his second son, Simone, married Antiochia, daughter of Pietro Visconti and finally, his younger son, Francesco, who served as the governor of Istria, married Costanza, a niece of Alberto Scotti, Lord of Piacenza (1270-1318).

Italian nobility
| Preceded by Matteo I Visconti | Lord of Milan; 1302–1311 | Succeeded by Matteo I Visconti |
