= Bonacossa Borri =

Milanese noblewoman (1254–1321)

Bonacossa Borri, also known as Bonaca, Bonacorsa, Buonacosa, Bonaccossi, and Bonacosta (1254–1321), was Lady of Milan by marriage from 1269 to 1321.

== Biography ==
Bonacossa was the daughter of Squarcina Borri (1230–1277, also called Scarsini), captain of exiles from Milan from the advent of the Torriani family, and a loyal supporter of the Visconti, and Antonia (1236–?), daughter of Guglielmo I de Suavis, who married in 1254. Borri's family was originally from the town of Santo Stefano Ticino, together with some feudal lands of nearby Corby. The Borri family was one of the most respected of Milan, and counted among its ranks a saint, Monas of Milan, Bishop of Milan.

Once the Visconti had conquered Milan, Squarcina Borri gave his daughter in marriage to Matteo I Visconti, Lord of Milan in 1269 to cement those bonds essential to maintaining the rule of the Visconti. Bonacossa was Matteo I Visconti's second wife, and they had many children together.

Bonacossa and her husband co-founded the chapel of St. Thomas in the Basilica of Sant'Eustorgio of Milan, where they were buried, along with their son Stefano and his two daughters Beatrice and Catherine, and the brother of Matteo, Uberto III Visconti.

She died in Milan on 13 January 1321.

== Descendants ==
- Galeazzo I Lord of Milan. He married Beatrice d'Este
- Beatrice (b. 1280), married Spinetta Malaspina of Verucola
- Caterina (b. 1282 – d. 1311), married Alboino della Scala
- Luchino (b. 1285) Lord of Milan, married Violente di Saluzzo
- Stefano (b. 1287) Count of Arona, married Valentina Doria
- Marco (b. 1289)
- Giovanni (b. 1291), Archbishop of Milan
- Zaccaria (b. 1295), married Otto Rusconi
- Floramonda, married Guido Mandelli, count of Maccagno
- Agnese, married Cecchino della Scala

== See also ==
- Corbetta, Lombardy
- Santo Stefano Ticino
