= Matteo I Visconti =

Lord of Milan (1250–1322)

- Lord of Milan; Imperial Vicar
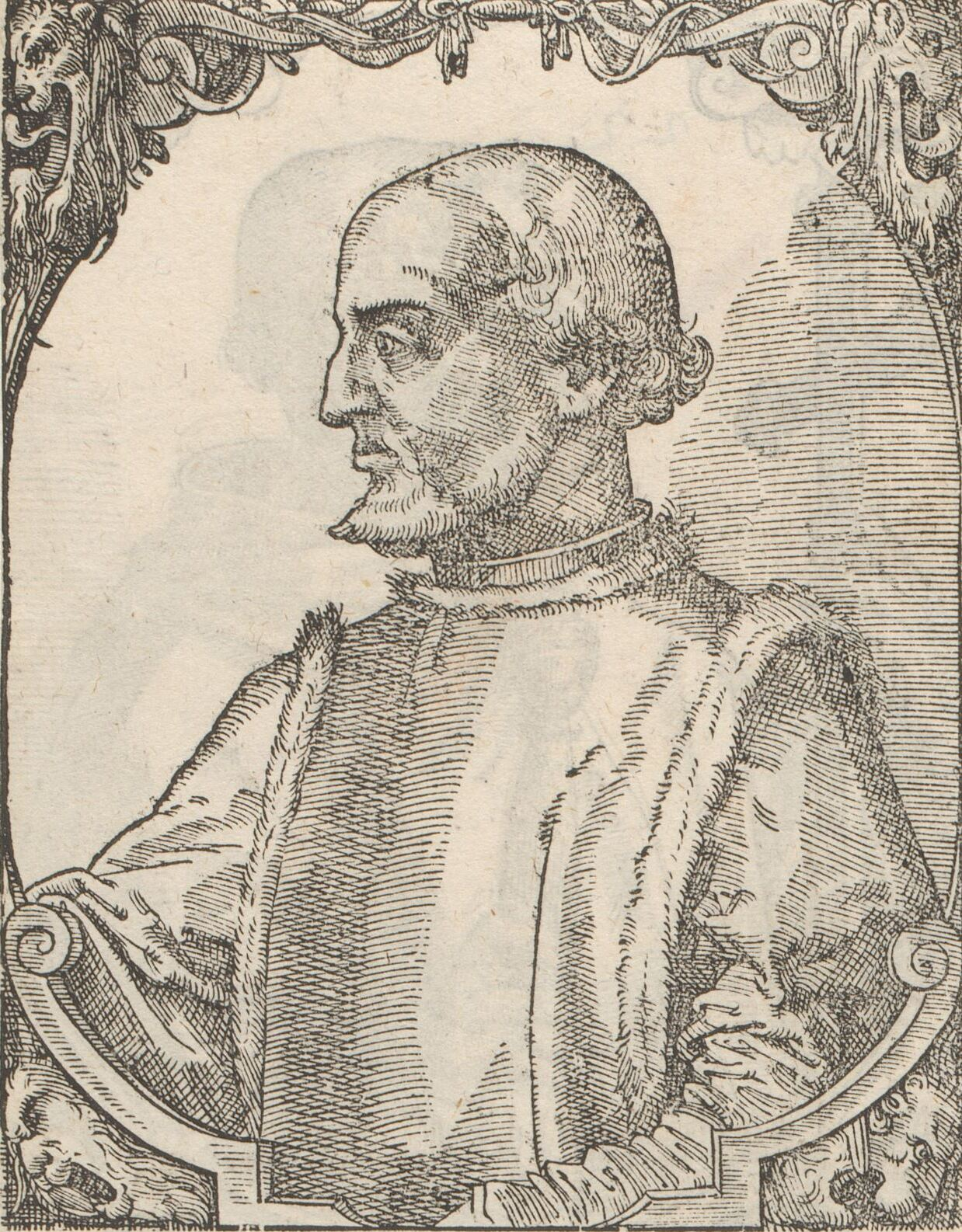
- Engraved portrait of Matteo I Visconti by Tobias Stimmer

Lord of Milan
- Rule: 1295–1301, 1311–1322
- Predecessor: Ottone Visconti
- Successor: Galeazzo I Visconti
- Born: 1250
- Died: 24 June 1322 (aged 71–72); Crescenzago
- Noble family: Visconti
- Spouse: Bonacossa Borri
- Issue: Galeazzo I, Lord of Milan; Luchino, Lord of Milan; Stefano, Count of Arona; Giovanni, Archbishop of Milan; Marco (Balatrone), Lord of Lucca and Rosate
- Father: Teobaldo Visconti
- Mother: Anastasia Pirovano

Matteo I Visconti (1250 – 24 June 1322) was the second of the Milanese Visconti family to govern Milan. Matteo was born to Teobaldo Visconti and Anastasia Pirovano.

In 1287, Matteo's uncle Ottone Visconti, archbishop and first lord of Milan, nominated him as capitano del popolo of Milan. Following his uncle's death in 1295, he succeeded him as lord of Milan. Matteo was appointed numerous times as Imperial Vicar over the whole of Lombardy, while expanding, with the assistance of his sons, his sphere of influence to Piedmont, Emilia, Bologna, and Genoa. Caught between the Papal and Imperial power struggle over northern Italy, Matteo would renounce his imperial title as "General Lord of the Milanese People". Found guilty on the charge of necromancy, excommunicated, and facing a crusade, Matteo resigned his position and died months later. He was succeeded by his son Galeazzo I.

== Life ==
=== The early years ===
Matteo was the son of Teobaldo Visconti, and the great-nephew of the first lord (that is, governor) of Milan, Ottone Visconti. His mother was Anastasia Pirovano. In August, 1269, Matteo married Bonacossa Borri. His great-uncle Ottone appointed him Capitano del Popolo [Captain of the People] of Milan, after winning the battle of Desio in 1277. In 1289 and 1294, the citizens of Milan re-elected him Captain of the people.

=== Imperial influence ===
Following the death of William VII, Marquess of Montferrat in 1292, Matteo expanded his influence westward, taking Casale, gaining the lordships of Novara and Vercelli, and the captaincy of Alessandria. His expansion was temporary as William's son, John of Monferrat, re-took Alessandria and forced the Ghibellines out of Novara and Vercelli.

Despite this setback, Matteo was appointed Imperial Vicar of Lombardy in 1294 by Adolf of Nassau. The next year, after the death of Ottone, a period of struggle for domination of Milan began anew between the Ghibellines (the supporters of the Kings of the Romans and Holy Roman Emperors and thus also of Matteo as Imperial Vicar) and the Guelphs, the partisans of the Pope led by the traditional enemies of the Visconti, the Della Torre family. In 1299, Albert I of Germany reappointed him as Imperial Vicar.

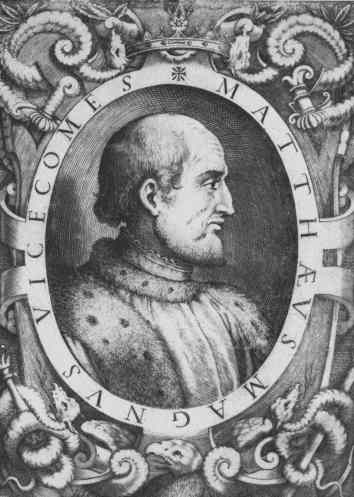
Visconti, Matteo Magno

Matteo managed to remain at the helm of the city until June 1302, when Guido della Torre again took the lordship of Milan, through a league formed by the Torriani and the anti-Visconti families of the cities of Cremona, Pavia, Piacenza, Novara, Vercelli, Lodi, Crema, and Monferrato led by Alberto Scotti and Ghiberto da Correggio. Matteo's home in Milan was attacked and looted. Forced into exile, Matteo remained for several years a guest of the Scaliger family at Nogarola (Motteggiana).

In 1311, Matteo met the German King Henry VII at Asti and from this, received a mandate to reach a peace agreement in Lombardy. On 4 December that year, Matteo and the archbishop Cassone della Torre signed an agreement. Between December 1310 and February 1311, the German King, who was crowned King of Italy on 6 January by Cassone della Torre, tried to find common ground between the Torriani and Visconti. However, on 12 February, German soldiers of Henry VII faced an armed Torriani force, led by Guido della Torre, who did not accept the treaty between their cousin Cassone and Matteo. The King's forces prevailed and Guido della Torre fled Milan. Due to his suspected involvement in della Torre's downfall, Matteo was exiled for a time, but on 13 July 1311 King Henry sold the title of imperial vicar for Milan to Matteo. They then organized a league that included Milan, Como, Novara, Vercelli, Bergamo, Brescia, Lodi, Cremona, and Piacenza, which had all become Ghibelline cities loyal to the Emperor. Just over a year later, the Emperor died on 24 August 1313 at Buonconvento in Tuscany. In 1314, claiming descent from the fictitious counts of Angera, Matteo occupied Angera castle, property of the archbishop of Milan. He commissioned a fresco in the main hall of the castle which illustrated the victory of the Visconti family over Napoleone della Torre at the battle of Desio.

=== Suppression of the Guelphs ===
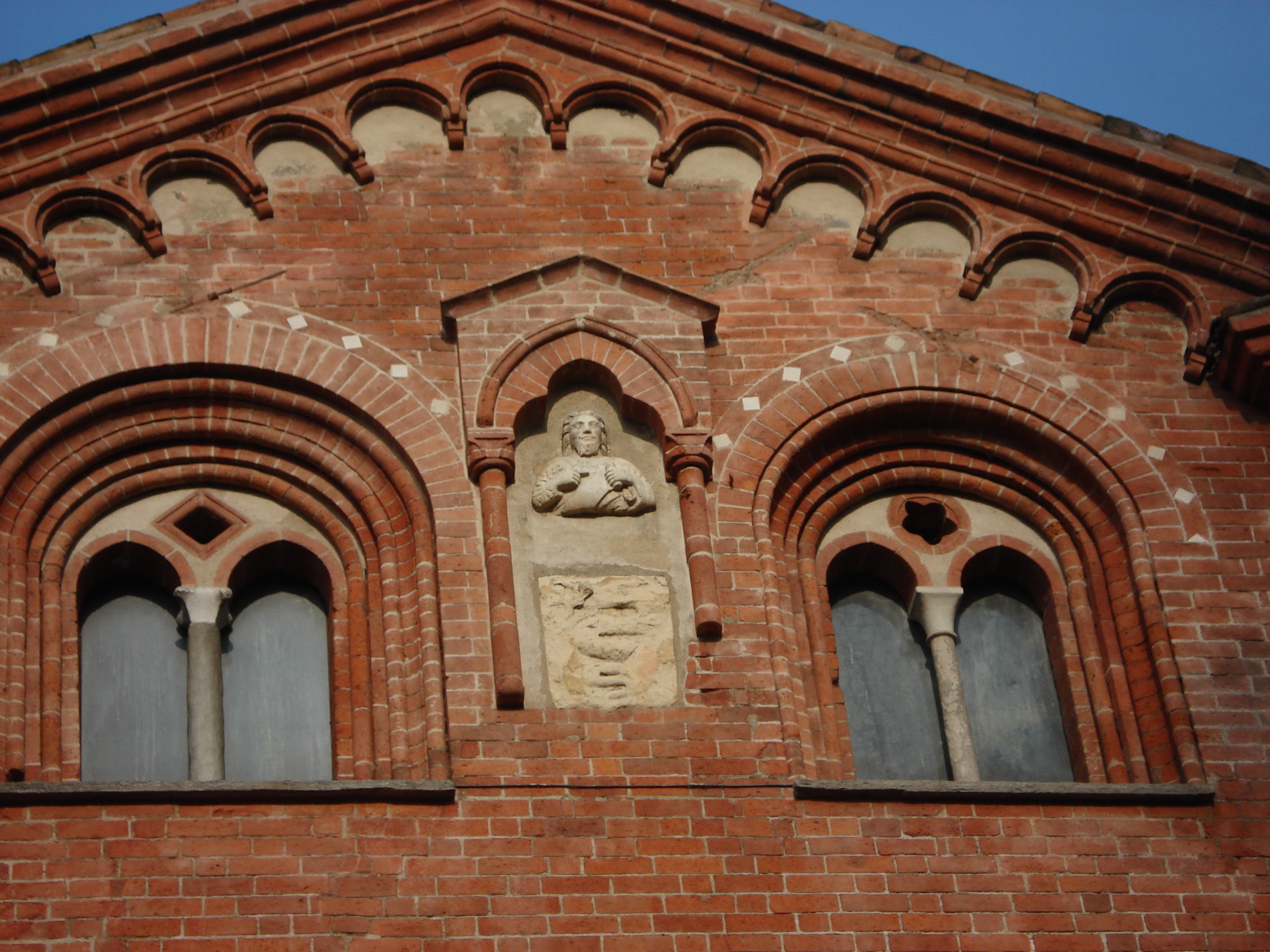
The bust and coat-of-arms of Matteo Visconti at the Basilica of Sant'Eustorgio, in Milan. It is located on the outer wall of the chapel of St. Thomas, also known as Visconti Chapel. Visconti had it constructed in 1297 when he was 47 years old, and at this time his portrait was carved.

Matteo, despite his lack of military talent, had warlike sons who were directly involved in the war against the Guelphs. In October 1315 Matteo's sons, Marco Visconti and Luchino Visconti defeated the Tuscan Guelphs on the Scrivia River near Voghera, which was followed by the capture of Pavia. This re-established Ghibelline control. For security, Matteo built a castle with a Milanese garrison in the city, captained by his son Luchino.

== Conflict with the Church ==
In an attempt to halt imperial influence over northern Italy, Pope John XXII declared in his bull of 1317, Si fratrum, that anyone claiming the title "Imperial Vicar" without papal consent would be excommunicated. This bull was specifically directed at Matteo of Milan, Cangranda della Scala in Verona and Este in Ferrara. In response, Matteo took the title "General Lord of the Milanese People". The pope appointed two emissaries, Bernard Gui and Bertrand de la Tour, to investigate the Ghibelline areas of Milan, Lombardy, and Romagna. These emissaries insisted on the freeing and restoration of Guelphs. When their peace efforts failed, the pope entrusted the bishops of Asti and Como to enforce the peace accords with the threat of excommunication and interdict. In September, the pope appointed Aicardo Camodeia, a Franciscan, as Archbishop of Milan. During this time, the papal legate, Cardinal Bertrand du Poujet, proclaimed from Asti a holy crusade against the Visconti.

=== Excommunication ===
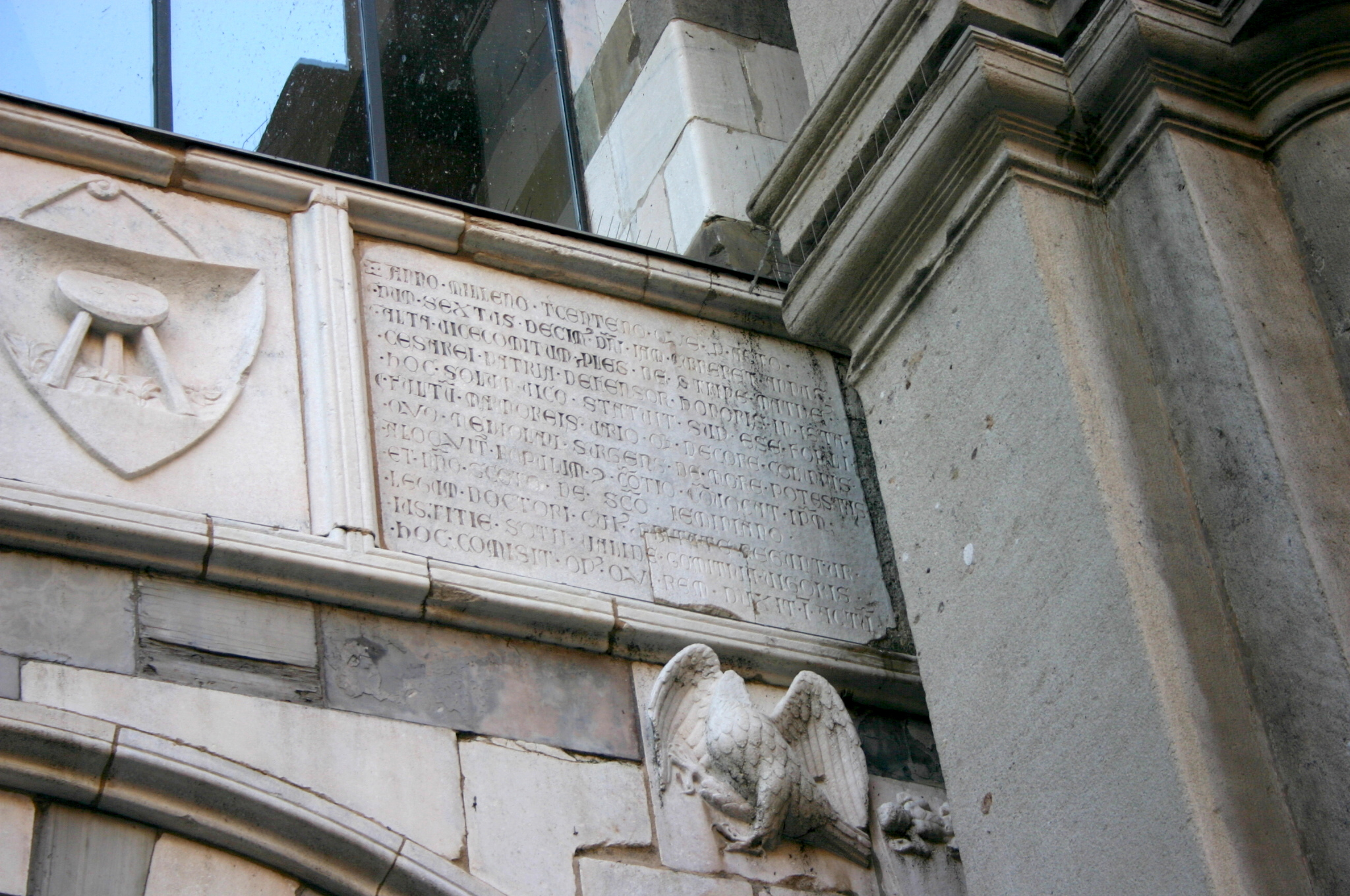
A plaque on the Osii Loggia in Piazza Mercanti ("Merchant square") in Milan, built in 1316 by Scoto da San Gimignano for Matteo I Visconti. Picture by Giovanni Dall'Orto

In 1322 at Avignon, Pope John XXII raised the charge of necromancy against Matteo. Matteo refused to appear before the court in the papal city, citing his age and the precarious state of health. The next month the court convicted Matteo in absentia of necromancy. In December, the Pope asked his appointee, the de jure Archbishop of Milan, Aicardo da Camodeia, to open a new case of heresy against Matteo and his son, Galeazzo. Archbishop Camodeia judged them as heretics, condemned Matteo, and ordered the confiscation of his property and the vacating of all his offices.

At the end of May 1322, Matteo ceded power to his son Galeazzo and retired to Crescenzago. Matteo died on 24 June 1322.

== Family ==
Matteo married Bonacossa Borri; they had:

- Floramonda, who married Guido Mandelli, the Count of Maccagno;
- Galeazzo I (b. 1277), Lord of Milan, who married Beatrice d'Este, daughter of Obizzo II d'Este and widow of Nino Visconti;
- Beatrice (about n.1280), who married Spinetta Malaspina, Marquis of Verucola (Fivizzano);
- Catherine (b. about 1282), who married Alboino I della Scala
- Luchino (b. about 1285) Lord of Milan, married three times: to Violante of Saluzzo, daughter of Thomas I of Saluzzo, then to Caterina Spinola, daughter of Obizzo Spinola, and, in 1349, to Isabella Fieschi, niece of Pope Adrian V;
- Stefano (b. about 1287), Count of Arona, married Valentina Doria, daughter of Bernabò Doria and Eliana Fieschi;
- Marco (b. about 1289)
- Giovanni (b. about 1291), archbishop of Milan;
- Zaccarina (b. around 1295), who married Otto Rusconi;
- Agnese, who married Cecchino della Scala

== See also ==
- List of rulers of Milan

== Sources ==
- Andenna, Giancarlo (2014-11-28). "The Lombard Church in the Late Middle Ages". In Gamberini, Andrea (ed.). A Companion to Late Medieval and Early Modern Milan. Leiden: Brill. pp. 69–92. doi:10.1163/9789004284128. ISBN 9789004284128. OCLC 897378766.
- Applauso, Nicolino (2018). "Sarcasm and its Consequences in Diplomacy and Politics in Medieval Italy". In Baragona, Alan; Rambo, Elizabeth L. (eds.). Words that tear the flesh : essays on sarcasm in medieval and early modern literature and cultures. Berlin; Boston: De Gruyter. pp. 119–142. ISBN 9783110563252. OCLC 1020699568.
- Armstrong, Edward (1932). "Italy in the time of Dante". In Bury, J. B.; Brooke, Z. N.; Tanner, J. R.; Previté-Orton, C. W. (eds.). The Cambridge Medieval History Volume VII : Decline of Empire and Papacy. Cambridge, UK: University Press. pp. 1-48. ISBN 0521045398. OCLC 317825301.
- Beattie, Blake R (2007). Angelus pacis: the legation of Cardinal Giovanni Gaetano Orsini, 1326-1334. Medieval Mediterranean. Vol. v. 67. Leiden Boston: Brill. ISBN 9789047411000. OCLC 290558761.
- Benedetti, Marina (2009). "La costruzione ideologico-giuridica di una rete di rapporti in Lombardia all'inizio del Trecento". In Rigon, Antonio; Veronese, Francesco (eds.). L'età dei processi : inchieste e condanne tra politica e ideologia nel '300 (in Italian). Roma Ascoli Piceno: Istituto storico italiano per il Medio Evo; Istituto superiore di studimedievale Cecco d'Ascoli. pp. 7–30. ISBN 9788889190593. OCLC 535488027.
- Black, Jane (2009-10-08). Absolutism in Renaissance Milan: Plenitude of Power Under the Visconti and the Sforza 1329-1535. Oxford University Press. doi:10.1093/acprof:oso/9780199565290.001.0001. ISBN 9780199565290. OCLC 1007134403.
- Campbell, Gordon, ed. (2003). "Visconti family". The Oxford dictionary of the Renaissance. Oxford; New York: Oxford University Press. pp. 801–802. doi:10.1093/acref/9780198601753.001.0001. ISBN 9780191727795. OCLC 62347805.
- Clarke, M. V. (2016) [1926]. The medieval city state : an essay on tyranny and federation in the later Middle Ages. Oxon: Routledge. ISBN 9781317287650. OCLC 933433255.
- Dunlop, Anne (2009). Painted palaces : the rise of secular art in early Renaissance Italy. University Park, Pa: Pennsylvania State University Press. ISBN 9780271034089. OCLC 233485670.
- Gamberini, Andrea (2014-11-28). "Milan and Lombardy in the Era of the Visconti and the Sforza". In Gamberini, Andrea (ed.). A Companion to Late Medieval and Early Modern Milan. Leiden: Brill. pp. 19–30. doi:10.1163/9789004284128. ISBN 9789004284128. OCLC 897378766.
- Godthardt, Frank (2012). "The Life of Marsilius of Padua". In Moreno-Riaño, Gerson; Nederman, Cary J (eds.). A companion to Marsilius of Padua. Boston: Brill. pp. 13–56. doi:10.1163/9789004215092. ISBN 9789004215092. OCLC 900297087. OCLC 767696227, 900297087.
- Herde, Peter (1995). "The empire: (a) From Adolph of Nassau to Lewis of Bavaria, 1292–1347". In Jones, Michael (ed.). The New Cambridge medieval history. Vol. VI. Cambridge, England; New York, NY, US: Cambridge University Press. pp. 515–550. ISBN 9780521362900. OCLC 29184676.
- Law, John (1995). "Italy in the age of Dante and Petrarch: (a) The Italian north". In Jones, Michael (ed.). The New Cambridge medieval history. Vol. VI. Cambridge, England; New York, NY, US: Cambridge University Press. pp. 442–468. ISBN 9780521362900. OCLC 29184676.
- Lee, Alexander (2018). Humanism and empire : the imperial ideal in fourteenth-century Italy. Oxford: Oxford University Press. ISBN 978-0-19-166264-5. OCLC 1023576095.
- Lodge, Richard (1904) [1902]. "Chapter II: Italy and the Papacy, 1273–1313". The close of the middles ages, 1273–1494. London: Rivingtons. pp. xiii–xv, 36, 40–41, 545. ISBN 9781330354872. OCLC 613237859.
- Marina, Areli (2013). "The Langobard Revival of Matteo il Magno Visconti, Lord of Milan". I Tatti Studies in the Italian Renaissance. 16 (1/2). University of Chicago Press: 377–414. doi:10.1086/673405. ISSN 0393-5949. OCLC 5530286111. S2CID 194035594.
- Paoletti, John T; Radke, Gary M (1997). "Genealogies (appendix)". Art in Renaissance Italy. New York: H.N. Abrams. p. 548. ISBN 9780810919785. OCLC 36482283.
- Peterson, Janine Larmon (2008). "The Politics of Sanctity in Thirteenth-Century Ferrara". Traditio. 63 (1). New York: Fordham University Press: 307–326. doi:10.1353/trd.2008.0008. ISSN 2166-5508. OCLC 4894028887. S2CID 143965335.
- Russell, Jeffrey Burton (1972). Witchcraft in the Middle Ages. Ithaca, NY: Cornell University Press. ISBN 9780801492891. OCLC 246888.
- Starn, Randolph (1982). Contrary commonwealth : the theme of exile in medieval and Renaissance Italy. Berkeley: University of California Press. ISBN 9780520046153. OCLC 8052509.
- Williams, George L. (1998). Papal genealogy: The families and descendants of the popes. Jefferson, NC, US: McFarland. ISBN 9780786403158. OCLC 1056200577.
- Williman, Daniel (2010). "Visconti family". In Bjork, Robert E. (ed.). The Oxford Dictionary of the Middle Ages. Oxford University Press. ISBN 978-0-19-866262-4.

Italian nobility
Preceded by Ottone Visconti	Lord of Milan; 1294–1302	Succeeded by Guido della Torre
Preceded by Guido della Torre	Lord of Milan; 1311–1322	Succeeded by Galeazzo I Visconti
