= Martino della Torre =

Ruler of Milan (died 1263)

- Ruler of Milan
- Reign: 1259–1263
- Died: 20 November 1263; Lodi, Lombardy
- Buried: Abbazia di Chiaravalle
- Noble family: Della Torre
- Spouse: A sister of Paolo da Soresina
- Father: Jacopo della Torre

Martino della Torre (died 1263) was an Italian condottiero and statesman.

== Early life ==
Martino della Torre was a son of Jacopo della Torre and a nephew of Pagano I, who established the power of the della Torre family (also known as Torriani) in Milan. In 1241, he opposed the nomination as podestà of the city of Paolo da Soresina, and married one of da Soresina's sisters, with whom he had no children.

== Career ==
Leader of the popular party, in 1259, he was elected in the Council of the Elder, but when he abused his power, the ousted nobles called the Ghibelline leader Ezzelino III da Romano to fight him. The latter was defeated at Cassano d'Adda by the Guelph league led by Martino and Oberto Pallavicino: della Torre obtained the estates of Lodi, Como, Vercelli, and Bergamo.

He subsequently struggled against the election of Ottone Visconti as archbishop of Milan by Pope Urban IV, but ended up succeeding. After defeating the allies of the Visconti, he received the ruler of Novara.

== Death ==
Martino della Torre probably died in Lodi, Lombardy on 20 November 1263 and he was buried at the Abbazia di Chiaravalle alongside his father and Pagano.

== Bibliography ==
- Rosati, Elio; Carassiti, Anna Maria (2006) [1996]. Dizionario delle battaglie. Rome: Rusconi Libri. p. 383. ISBN 9788818021073.
