= Ottone Visconti =

Archbishop of Milan

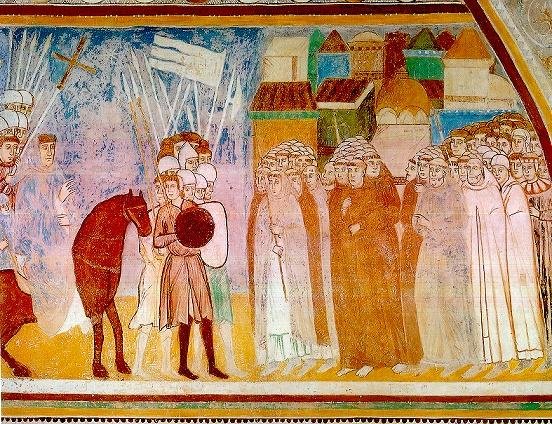
- Fresco in the Hall of Justice of the Rocca Borromeo di Angera depicting the victorious entry of Archbishop Ottone Visconti into Milan.

Lord of Milan
- Rule: 21 January 1277 – 8 August 1295
- Predecessor: Napoleone della Torre
- Successor: Matteo I Visconti
- Born: 1207; Invorio, Massino's Court, Italy
- Died: 8 August 1295 (aged 88); Chiaravalle Abbey, Milan, Italy
- Buried: 1295; Milan Cathedral
- Noble family: Visconti
- Father: Uberto Visconti
- Mother: Berta Pirovano
- Archbishop of Milan
- Church: Catholic Church
- Archdiocese: Milan
- See: Milan Cathedral
- Appointed: 22 July 1262
- In office: 1262–1295
- Predecessor: Leone da Perego
- Successor: Ruffino da Frisseto

Personal details
- Motto: Vipereos Mores Non Violabo

Ottone Visconti (1207 – 8 August 1295) was Archbishop of Milan and Lord of Milan, the first of the Visconti line. Under his rule, the commune of Milan became a strong Ghibelline city and one of the Holy Roman Empire's seats in Italy.

== Biography ==
=== Early life ===
Born in Invorio, near Novara, Ottone was one of the six children of Uberto Visconti, lord of Massino, and Berta Pirovano. Along with his brother Azzone (later Bishop of Ventimiglia), Ottone was forced into an ecclesiastical career by his family. He became canon of Desio and in 1247 chamberlain of the powerful Cardinal Ottaviano degli Ubaldini. Under his patronage, Ottone was appointed by Archbishop of Milan Leone da Perego as his envoy to France in 1252, gaining the trust of Pope Innocent IV, becoming his chaplain.

After the death of Leone da Perego in 1257, Ottone was supported by Cardinal Ubaldini as successor to the Archdiocese of Milan, against Raimondo della Torre's candidacy. This action displeased the city's lord Martino della Torre (relative of Raimondo), who claimed the historical autonomy of Milan on Archbishop appointments. Despite Martino's opposition, Pope Urban IV chose Ottone as the new archbishop of Milan on 22 July 1262.

=== Power struggle in Milan ===
Ottone's insigne as Archbishop

The Pope's choice did not stop the hostility of Martino della Torre, who occupied Milan Cathedral on August 1262, resulting in his excommunication by the papal legate Filippo di Pistoia. This act started a war between Martino's family, the Della Torre or Torriani, and the Visconti. The two families were also politically opposed: the Della Torre were historically Guelphs and allies of Charles I of Anjou, while the Visconti were Ghibellines and exponents of low nobility.

Still in Montefiascone, near Viterbo, where he received Pope's appointment, Ottone marched to Arona on 1 April 1263, where he met several nobles who had fled Milan owing to their opposition to Della Torre. Informed of Ottone's presence in Lombardy, Martino sent his troops to put Arona under siege. Ottone, who occupied the near Rocca of Angera, was forced to surrender on 5 May 1263. Back in Montefiascone, Ottone lost his powerful ally Urban IV, who died in October 1264. Della Torre, however, never obtained Raimondo's formal appointment, and after Martino's death, the once-loyal Pallavicino family switched to the Visconti side, plotting the assassination of Paganino della Torre, podestà of Vercelli, in January 1266. In response, the new lord of Milan, Napoleone della Torre, executed 53 nobles, suspected of scheming. This vicious act undermined Della Torre's grip on Milan, aggravated by Pope Gregory X, a Visconti of Piacenza, who in 1273 confirmed Ottone Visconti as legal Archbishop of Milan. Napoleone della Torre reacted by exiling all noble families who did not support him, causing the formation of an émigré coalition in Novara and Pavia. Using their financial and military support, Ottone's nephew Teobaldo Visconti led an army in Vercelli, occupying Castelseprio. Defeated by Torriani's forces, Teobaldo fled to Lurate, near Como, but after a battle in Gallarate, his last forces were defeated, and he was beheaded by Napoleone della Torre in 1276. Ottone returned to Lombardy in the same year, recruited his supporters near Desio, where he was canon, and after a bloody battle in January 1277, Visconti emerged victorious. Napoleone della Torre was imprisoned and tortured to death in Castel Baradello, while his brother Francesco was executed after the battle. Ottone entered Milan on 22 January 1277, becoming the first Visconti de facto ruler of the city.

=== Rule and final years ===
Having become Lord of Milan at the age of 69, Ottone tried to strengthen his family's power in the city and Lombardy. The years of his rule were not peaceful: Della Torre still claimed the signoria (Italian for "lordship") and conquered Lodi and Castelseprio, ruling as a rogue power in the region between the Adda and Ticino rivers. Ottone sought the support of his ally William VII, Marquess of Montferrat, who demanded the city's government as Capitano generale (general-captain), granted to him in 1278. After William VII's side switched in 1281, Ottone re-acquired full powers on the city, and in the battle of Vaprio d'Adda of 1281, his forces defeated Cassone della Torre, who was killed in the battle, while Raimondo, the elder claimant to Milan Archdiocese, fled to Friuli.

In 1287, the old Ottone appointed his grand-nephew Matteo I Visconti as new Capitano generale and left political affairs to him. In August 1291, following the fall of Acre in the Holy Land to Muslim forces, Pope Nicholas IV appealed to Ottone, urging him to hasten the convening of a new provincial council to determine how the city might be regained and to levy a special tax on the clergy to support that effort. In 1294, Matteo Visconti also gained the title of Imperial vicar by Adolf, King of Germany. In his final years, Ottone never got involved in the politics of Milan, concentrating only on religious affairs. He died on 8 August 1295, aged 88, in the Abbey of Chiaravalle, and was buried in Milan Cathedral.

== Sources ==
- Andenna, Giancarlo (2015). "The Lombard Church in the Late Middle Ages". In Gamberini, Andrea (ed.). A Companion to Late Medieval and Early Modern Milan. Brill. pp. 69–92. ISBN 978-90-04-28409-8.70-71
- Caso, Anna (1989). "Della Torre, Napoleone, detto Napo". Treccani (in Italian). Vol. 37. Dizionario Biografico degli Italiani.
- Gamberini, Andrea (28 November 2014). "Milan and Lombardy in the Era of the Visconti and the Sforza". In Gamberini, Andrea (ed.). A Companion to Late Medieval and Early Modern Milan. Leiden: Brill. pp. 19–30. doi:10.1163/9789004284128. ISBN 9789004284128. OCLC 897378766.
- Lee, Alexander (2018). Humanism and empire : the imperial ideal in fourteenth-century Italy. Oxford: Oxford University Press. ISBN 978-0-19-166264-5. OCLC 1023576095.
- Motta, Antonio (1931). "Della Torre". Enciclopedia Italiana (in Italian).
- Rapelli, Paola (2011). Symbols of Power in Art. The J. Paul Getty Trust. ISBN 978-1-60606-066-7.
- Pyle, Cynthia M. (1993). "Towards the Biography of Gaspar Ambrogio Visconti". Bibliothèque d'Humanisme et Renaissance. 55 (3): 565–582.
- Simeoni, Luigi (1937). "VISCONTI, Ottone". In Forni Urso (ed.). Enciclopedia Italiana (in Italian).
- Visconti (2025). "Ottone Visconti". Treccani (in Italian). Istituto della Enciclopedia Italiana fondata da Giovanni Treccani.

Italian nobility
Preceded by Napo della Torre	Lord of Milan; 1277–1294	Succeeded by Matteo I Visconti
