= Pagano della Torre =

Patriarch of Aquileia

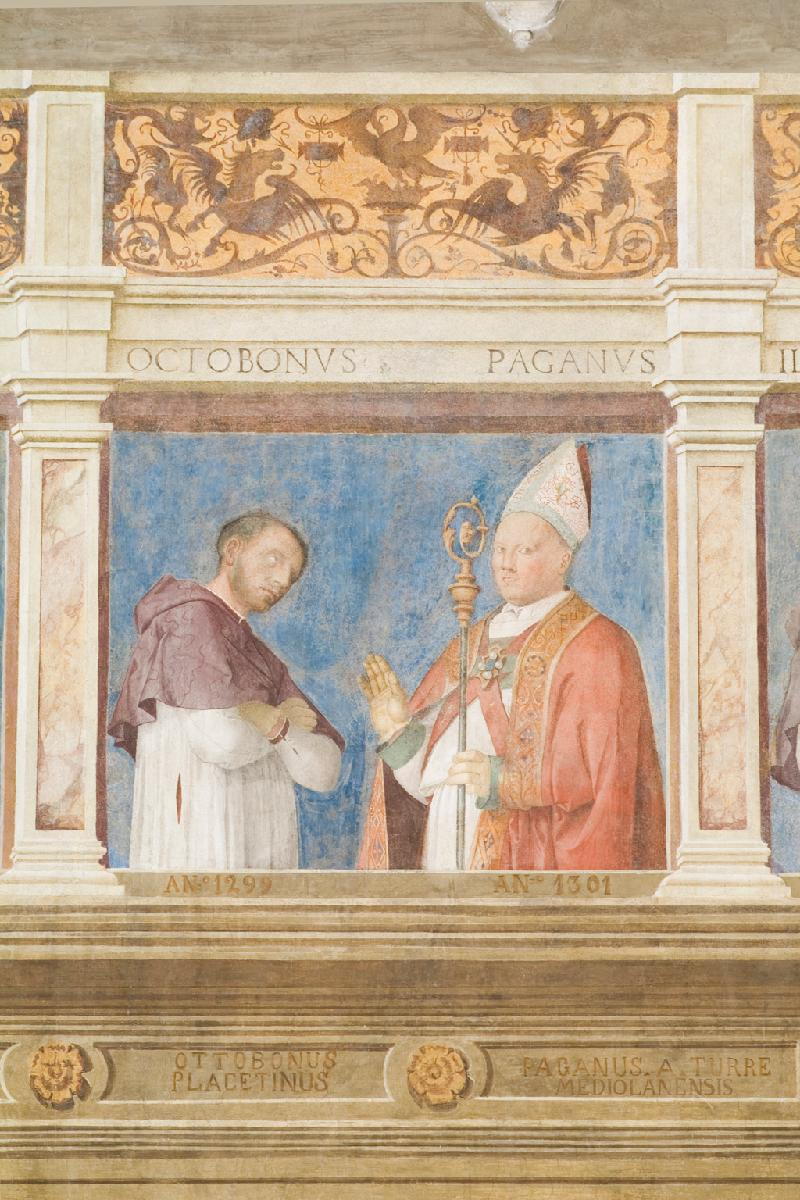
Pagano (right) and his predecessor, Ottobuono di Razzi, in a painting by Bartolomeo Montagna in the diocesan museum of Padua

Pagano della Torre (died 30 July 1365) was Patriarch of Aquileia from 1319 until 1332. Another with the same name, Pagano I della Torre, was a Guelph military leader and lord of the Valchiavenna during the first half of the 13th century (died 1256). Among his grandchildren were Martino, Napoleone, Guido, and Filippo della Torre, all involved in regional conflicts of Lombardy.

The son of Florimondo della Torre, he was a member of a family which had moved to Friuli after the Visconti had ousted them from Milan. Pagano was bishop of Padua in 1302–1319, and succeeded his uncle Cassono as secular patriarch of Aquileia at the latter's death, after having been a candidate to the same position also in 1302. In 1318, he was also made capitano in Trieste.

Pagano participated in the crusade against the Visconti, which was financed by selling indulgences in Trieste. However, he was defeated first at Bassignana (6 July 1322) and then at Vaprio (16 August 1324). The della Torre renounced Milan forever, and Pagano established his residence in Udine. However, the taxes he imposed to replenish the state treasury led to the secession of several cities (including Rovinj, Pula and Bale) during the 1330s, in favour of the Republic of Venice. The patriarch replied, ordering the sack of Venetian territories in Istria, but he was captured by the enemy commander Giovanni Corner. The situation was set with a treaty of peace with the mediation of Pope John XXII (1332).

In the same year, Pagano had to face an invasion of Friuli by emperor Louis IV's troops, which he was able to stop with the help of Mastino II della Scala, lord of Verona. He died late in 1332 and was buried in the basilica of Aquileia.

== Bibliography ==
- Bianchi, G. (1877). Documenti per la storia del Friuli dal 1200 al 1400. Tip. J.E. Colmegna.
- Guerra. Otium Foriiulii. Manoscritti. Museo Archeologico, Cividale.
- Tirelli, R. (2000). I patriarchi. La spada e la croce XV secoli di storia. Pordenone.

Catholic Church titles
Preceded by Cassono della Torre	Patriarch of Aquileia; 1319-1332	Succeeded by Bertram of St. Genesius
