= Uberto Visconti =

Italian nobleman (c. 1170–1248)

- Born: c. 1170; Italy
- Died: 1248
- Spouse: Bertha (Pirovano) Visconti
- Issue: 6, including Ottone
Names
- Uberto Visconti
- House: Visconti
- Father: Ruggero Visconti

Uberto Visconti (or Umberto Visconti; c. 1170 – 1248) was an Italian nobleman and feudal lord, lord of Massino, Albizzate and Besnate. He is named the progenitor of the dynasty of Milan.

== Biography ==
Uberto was probably born in 1170. Not much is known about his life other than being part of the Italian house of Visconti; he was the son of Ruggero Visconti, who was one of those sent by Frederick Barbarossa to reconcile with the inhabitants. Uberto was the one that gave origin to the lords and dukes of Milan. He probably gained the title of lord of Massino, Albizzate and Besnate by Frederick II. Uberto married Bertha (Pirovano) Visconti and had 6 sons, which 2 were the most known are Ottone and Azzo (or Azzone). Uberto died in 1248.
