= Cassone della Torre =

Italian medieval condottiero and feudal lord

- Patriarch of Aquileia
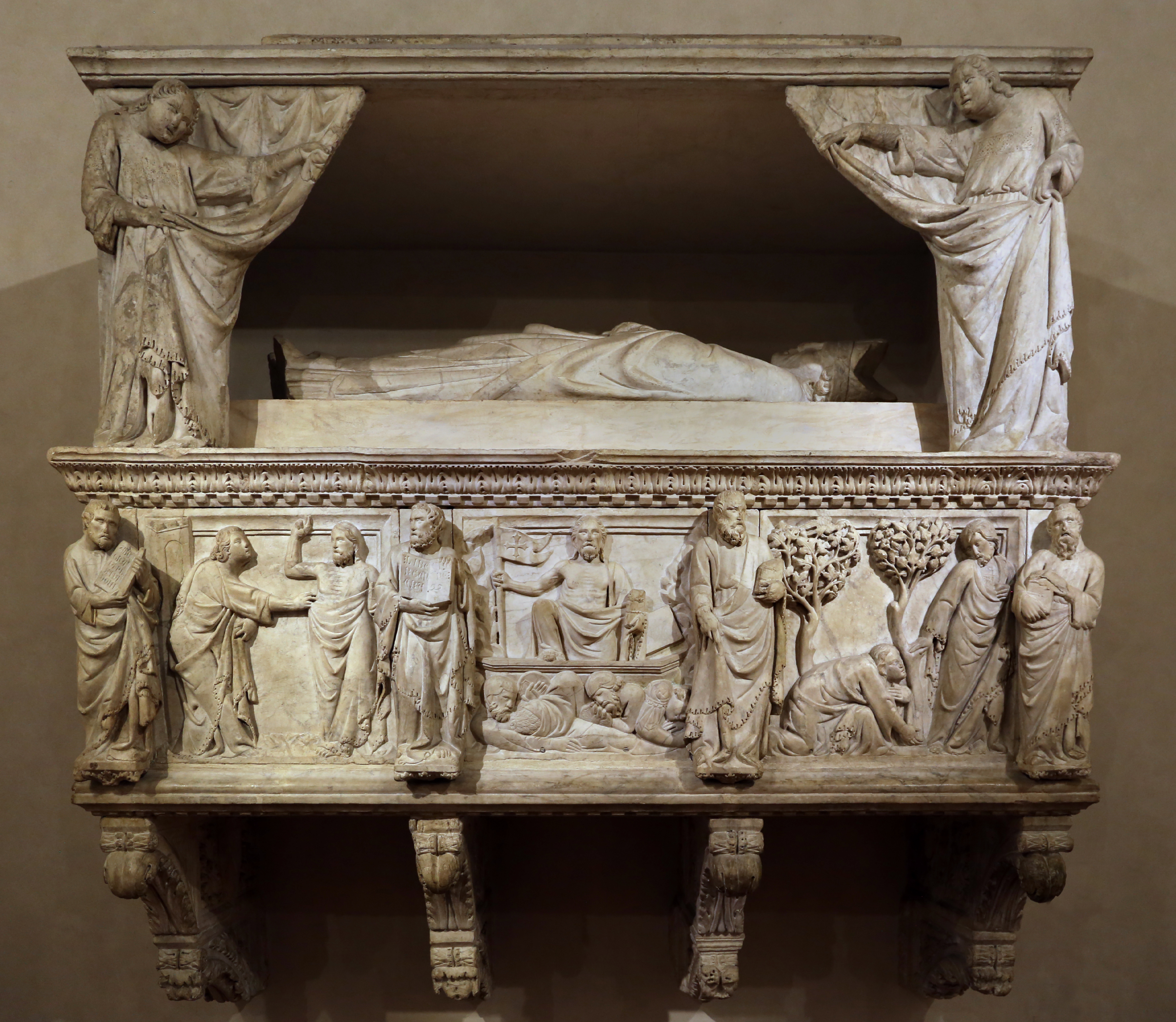
- Funerary monument to Cassone della Torre by Tino da Camaino
- Church: Catholic Church
- See: Aquileia
- Appointed: 31 December 1316
- Term ended: 20 August 1318
- Predecessor: Gillo of Villalta
- Successor: Pagano della Torre
- Previous post: Archbishop of Milan

Orders
- Consecration: 12 Oct 1308 (Bishop) by Ugaccione Borromeo, bishop of Novara

Personal details
- Died: 20 August 1318 near Florence
- Buried: Basilica of Santa Croce, Florence

Cassone della Torre (or Casso, Cassono, Castone, Gastone), also called Mosca (died 20 August 1318) was an Italian medieval condottiero and feudal lord. A member of the Torriani family, he was Archbishop of Milan from 1308 to 1316 and patriarch of Aquileia from 1317 to 1318.

== Biography ==
Cassone was the second son of Corrado della Torre and grandson of Napo della Torre. In his youth, he stayed in Friuli, then ruled by his grand-uncle Raimondo as patriarch of Aquileia: here most members of the family lived in exile from Milan after their arch-rival House of Visconti had been able to seize the power in that city.

Cassone was appointed canon of Cividale in 1296. When the della Torre were able to return to Milan in 1302, Cassone was appointed canon of the Cathedral of Milan.

In 1308, he succeeded Francesco da Parma as Archbishop of Milan, being elected by the Chapter of the Cathedral of Milan, confirmed by Pope Clement V and consecrated bishop in Milano by Ugaccione Borromeo, bishop of Novara on about 12 October 1308.

His appointment as Archbishop of Milano spurred a conflict with his cousin Guido della Torre, who was afraid that Cassone could ally with the Visconti against him (two of the archbishop's brothers were married to nephews of Matteo Visconti's wife). In 1309, he took part in a successful papal military expedition against the Republic of Venice, returning to Milan with great honours. On 1 October 130,9 Guido's troops attacked the archbishop's palace in Milan and imprisoned him. On 29 October 1309, he was exiled from Milan. He moved to Bologna where the papal legate excommunicated Guido della Torre.

Emperor Henry VII appointed Cassone mediator between the claims of the families Torriani and Visconti, who were in long conflict for ruling Milan. Cassone found an agreement between the two families, but it was not accepted by Guido della Torre; Emperor Henry VII then forced Guido della Torre to flee from Milan and sold the title of imperial vicar for Milan to Matteo I Visconti. Cassone re-entered Milan, and on 6 January 1311, he crowned Henry VII as King of Italy. The debt due to the Emperor by the citizens of Milan created dissatisfaction and the Torriani instigated a revolt, which was suppressed by the Visconti, supported by the soldiers of the Emperor. Cassone then fled from Milan. Following the sacking of the episcopal palace in Milan in 1314, he excommunicated Matteo I Visconti.

On 31 December 1316, Cassone renounced the title of See of Milan and was appointed as secular patriarch of Aquileia by Pope John XXII. However, he never took the post Friuli since he died in a fall from horse at Florence. There he was buried in the church of Santa Croce; his funerary monument was crested by Tino da Camaino.

Catholic Church titles
Preceded by Gillo of Villalta	Patriarch of Aquileia; 1316-1318	Succeeded by Pagano della Torre

== Sources ==
- Andenna, Giancarlo (2015). "The Lombard Church in the Late Middle Ages". In Gamberini, Andrea (ed.). A Companion to Late Medieval and Early Modern Milan: The Distinctive Features of an Italian State. Brill.
