= Della Torre =

Italian noble family

- Coat of arms of the Della Torre (1274)
- Founded: 11th century
- Founder: Martino "Gigante" Della Torre
- Final ruler: Guido della Torre
- Titles: Lord of Milan (1259‍–‍1277, 1302‍–‍1311)

The House of Della Torre (Torriani or Thurn) is an Italian noble family who dominated Lombardy and much of northern Italy between the 12th and 14th centuries. They owned the Lordship of Milan before being expelled by the Visconti at the Battle of Desio. They were members of the party of the Guelphs. Over the centuries, various branches of the family have acquired numerous titles, including barons, counts, marquesses, and even dukes and princes. Many members of the family have also been awarded various titles related to orders of knighthood. After being expelled from Milan, some branches prospered in Friuli, in the Patriarchate of Aquileia, and in Austrian and German lands. Some agnatic branches still survive today.

== History ==
The della Torre family erected a tower (tower house) in the Porta Nuova district of Milan, from which they derived their name (torre is Italian for "tower"). According to an alternative theory, they adopted the name from the village of Torre in Ticino, having migrated there from the Como area. They were subsequently granted the County of Valsassina in the late 13th century – located in the present-day province of Lecco – as a fief by the Archdiocese of Milan; the county's fortified main settlement was Primaluna. The granting of the fief may have occurred following a marriage into the family of an heiress of the local lords.

Numerous divergent and fanciful legends are associated with this event. The construction of lineage legends – typical of the late Middle Ages and especially the Renaissance, and sometimes tracing back to antiquity and mythology – led in the case of the Torriani to the unsubstantiated claim that a certain Frankish knight named Ariprand de la Tour, who "hailed from the sovereign House of France" (i.e., the Capetians), married Eurilla, the heiress of the Count of Valsassina, in 1095. Another theory traces the lineage back even further, positing that two brothers whose ancestry is traced back to Anscar I of Ivrea married two daughters of "Count Tacius" in Val Sassina – as early as the year 1000. Ariprand’s (or the brothers′) royal lineage is a legend likely linked to the sceptre adorned with golden lilies found in the Torriani coat of arms. However, the lily was the symbol of the pro-papal Guelph faction – led for a time in Lombardy by the Torriani – and originated from the fleur-de-lis coat of arms of the Capetian Charles of Anjou, who, with papal support, fought against the pro-imperial Hohenstaufen party from 1263 onwards.

=== The Torriani in Lombardy ===
The Della Torre family had been enfeoffed by the archdiocese of Milan with vast territories reaching as far as the Canton Ticino, whose main body was the county of Valsassina, with the fortified village of Primaluna in the centre.

The first notable member was Martino, nicknamed Il Gigante ("The Giant"), who fought in the Holy Land during the Crusades and died after 1147. His son, Jacopo, married Berta Visconti and was captain of Milan. Another son, Pagano the Elder, became podestà of Padua in 1195; his brother Cassone held the same office in Orvieto in 1204, and their nephew Pagano the Younger served in Brescia in 1227 and Bergamo in 1228. He became capitano del popolo of Milan in 1240, holding the position until his death in 1247. His brother Martino della Torre imposed his personal power over the city, beginning the Torriani lordship, which lasted some 50 years. He died in 1263 and was succeeded by another brother, Filippo.

Among the ten sons of Pagano the Younger were seven podestà who governed numerous cities in Northern Italy (Bologna, Florence, Pisa, Bergamo, Piacenza, Sacile, Novara, Brescia, Alessandria, Cremona, Mantua, Vercelli), as well as a bishop, Raimondo della Torre; the latter ascended the archiepiscopal see of Milan in 1261 but was forced to vacate it in favor of Ottone Visconti in 1262. He then served as Bishop of Como from 1262 to 1273 and subsequently as Patriarch of Aquileia until 1299; in the latter capacity, he waged war against the Republic of Venice from 1283 to 1291. Martino della Torre, a nephew of Pagano the Younger, ruled the city of Milan as podestà and signore from 1256 onwards; as leader of the popular faction – the Popolari – he thus established the fifty-year rule of the della Torre family in Milan, a family that headed the pro-papal Guelph faction, whereas the rival Visconti family led the pro-imperial Ghibellines.

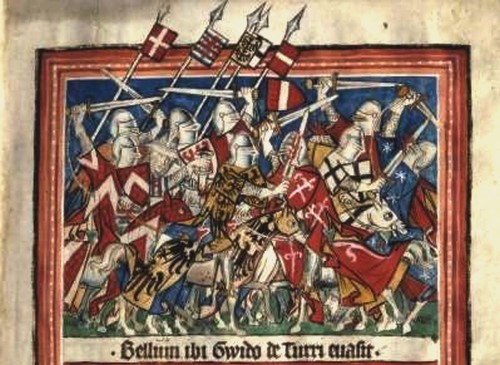
Guido della Torre fights against Imperial troops in 1311

Napoleone della Torre, one of the ten sons of Pagano the Younger, served as Imperial vicar of Lombardy under King Rudolf I of Germany, the first elected ruler from the House of Habsburg, from 1265 to 1277; however, Napoleone was defeated by Archbishop Ottone Visconti in the Battle of Desio in 1277 and died a prisoner in the Castello Baradello in Como. With the simultaneous defeat and death of Napoleone’s powerful brother Francesco – who had been podestà of Brescia, Alessandria, Bergamo, Lodi and Novara – the Visconti family secured power in Milan and throughout Lombardy. The territory ruled by Patriarch Raimondo della Torre in Aquileia and Friuli became a haven for the Torriani and other noble Guelph families. It was there and in the surrounding regions that they expanded their sphere of activity and influence: Napoleone’s son, Corrado Mosca della Torre, who had been signore of Milan between 1277 and 1281, became governor of Istria and Trieste. When Matteo I Visconti was temporarily driven out of Milan in 1302, Corrado Mosca managed to regain power there, which he held until 1307, when he was succeeded by his son Guido della Torre. Having tried to incite the people against Emperor Henry VII, Guido was forced to flee and died in 1312.

Florimondo della Torre, another son of Corrado Mosca, attempted in vain to regain power in Milan. His son Pagano della Torre was bishop of Padua and Patriarch of Aquileia from 1319 to 1332. Cassono della Torre (or Gastone), another son of Corrado Mosca, had become Archbishop of Milan in 1308 but soon came into conflict with his uncle Guido, by whom he was first imprisoned and then banished; however, from 1316 to 1318, he served as Patriarch of Aquileia. He was succeeded by Pagano della Torre, who held the office from 1319 to 1332. Paganino, Corrado's youngest son, became podestà of Como and Senator of Rome. Lodovico della Torre was also Patriarch of Aquileia (1359–65).

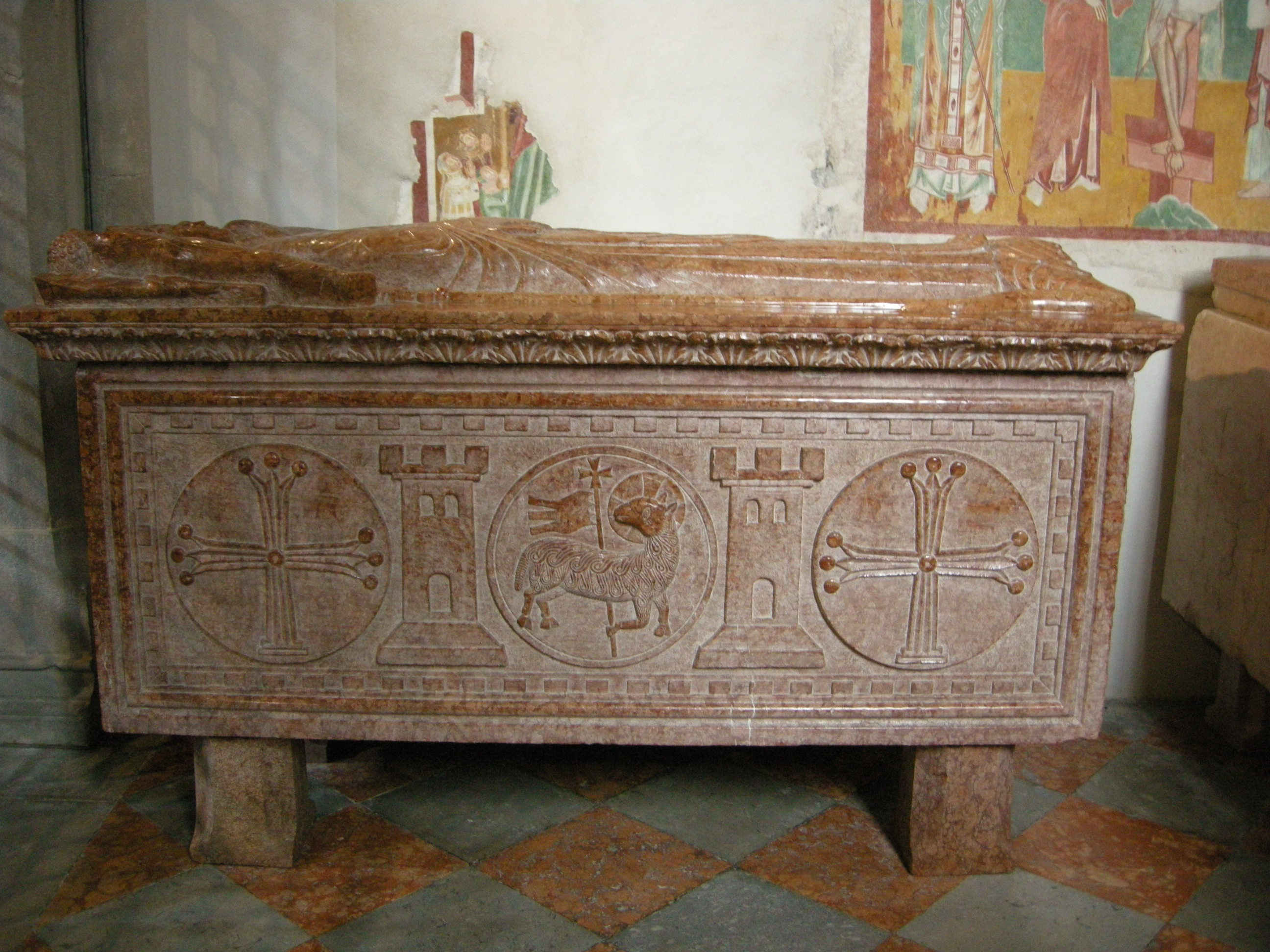
Sarcophagus of Patriarch Raimondo della Torre (d. 1299) in the Basilica of Aquileia

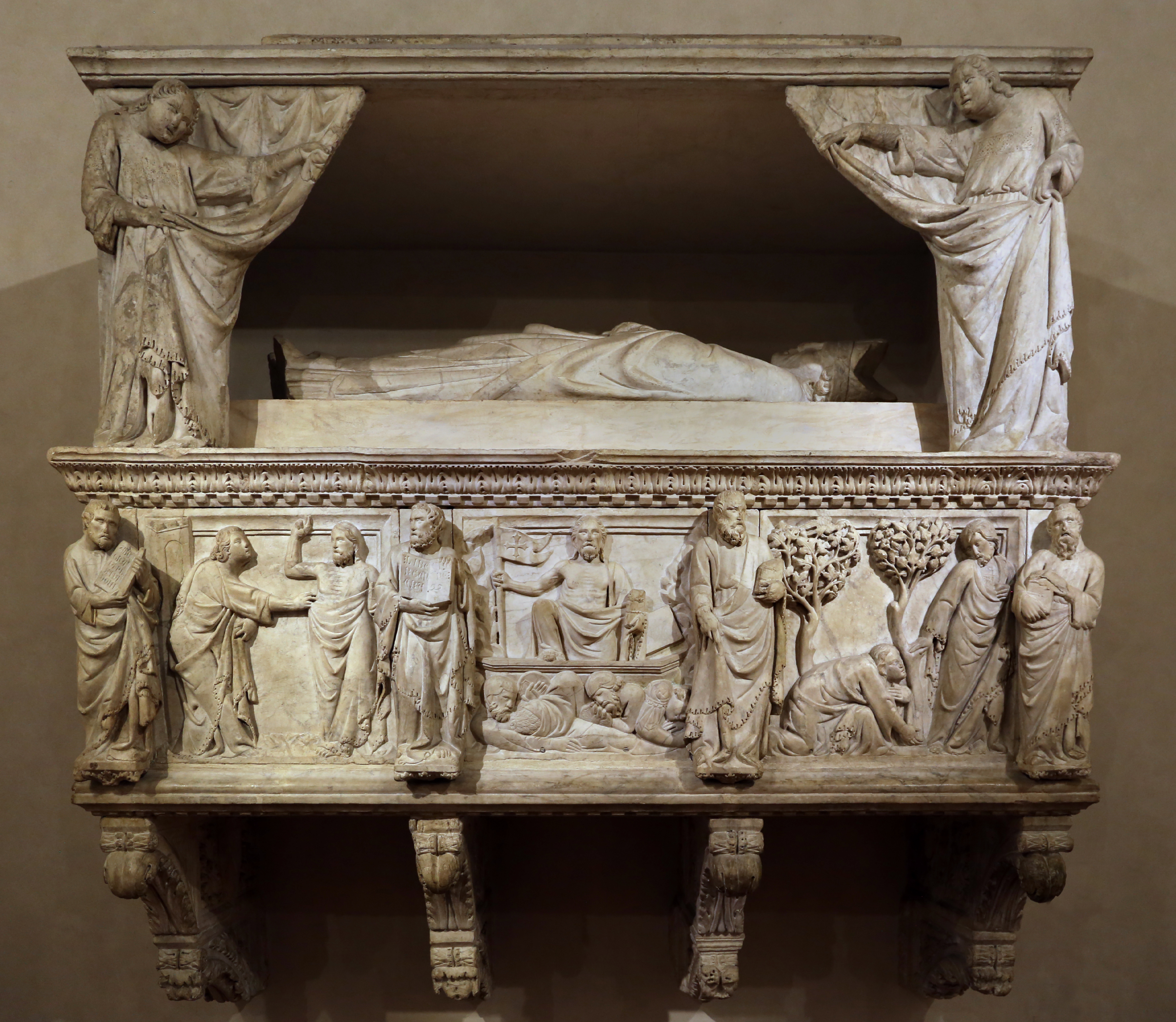
Tomb of Patriarch Cassono della Torre (d. 1318) in Santa Croce, Florence

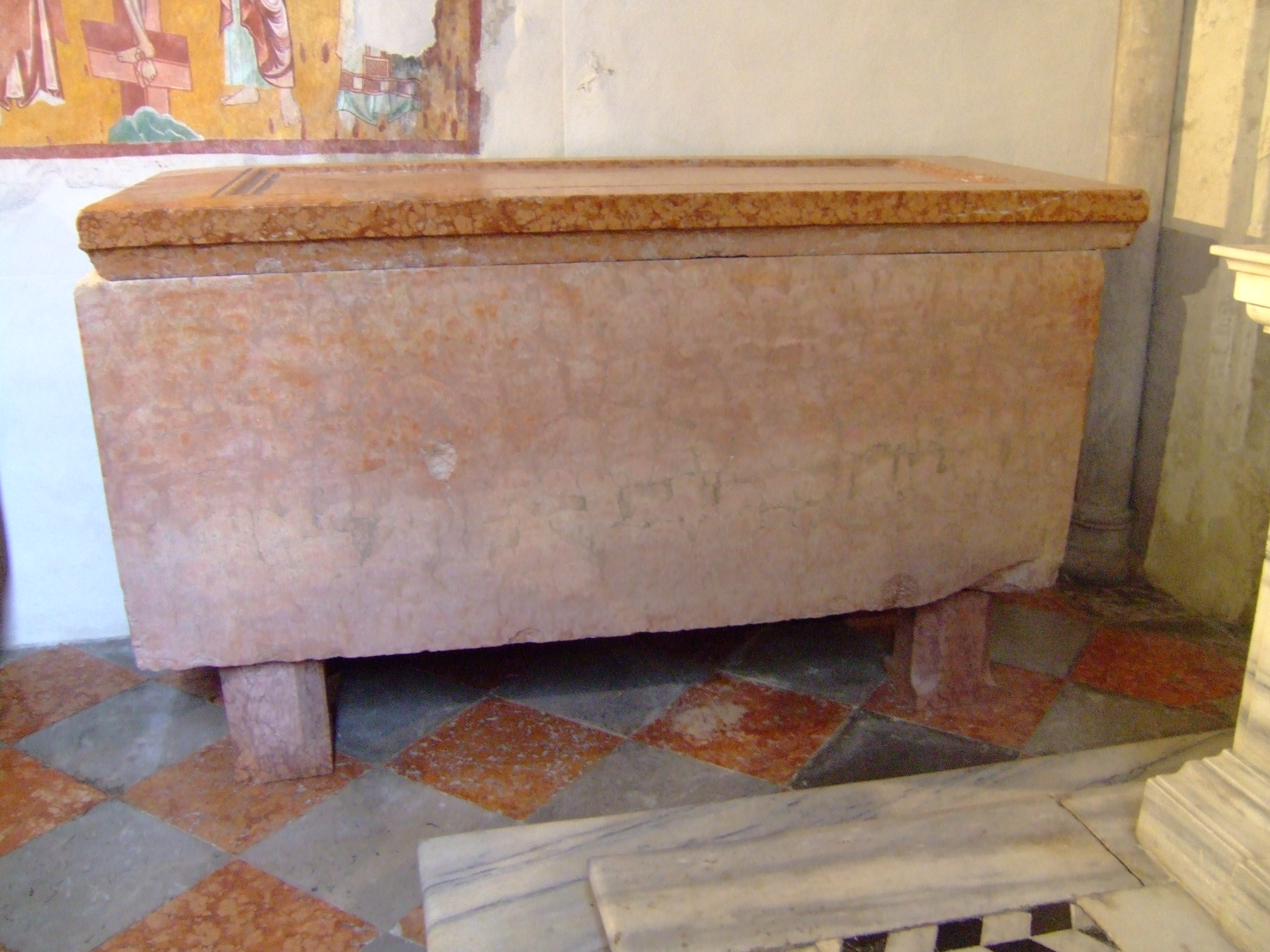
Sarcophagus of Patriarch Pagano della Torre (d. 1332), Aquileia

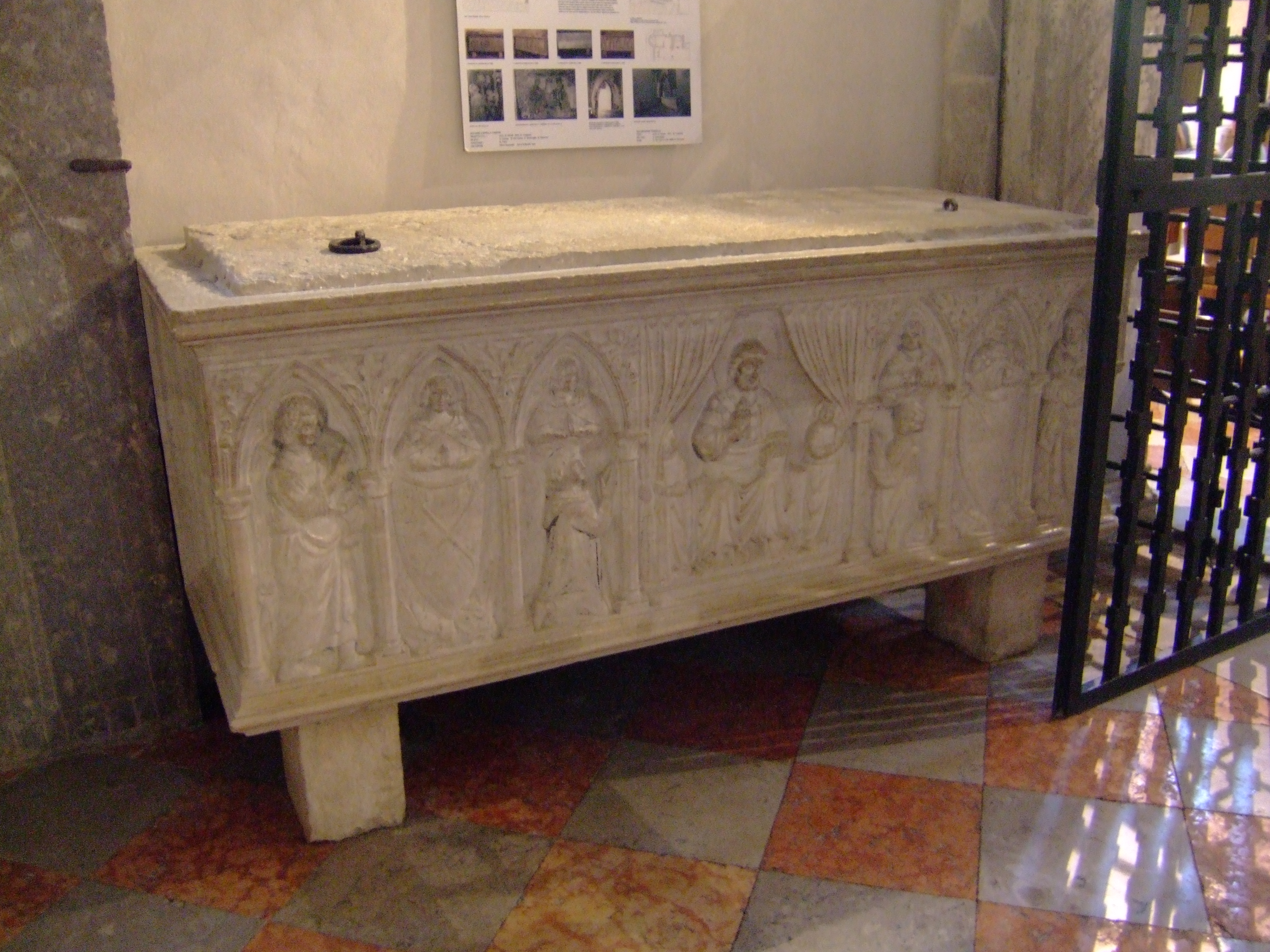
Sarcophagus of Patriarch Ludovico della Torre (d 1365), Aquileia

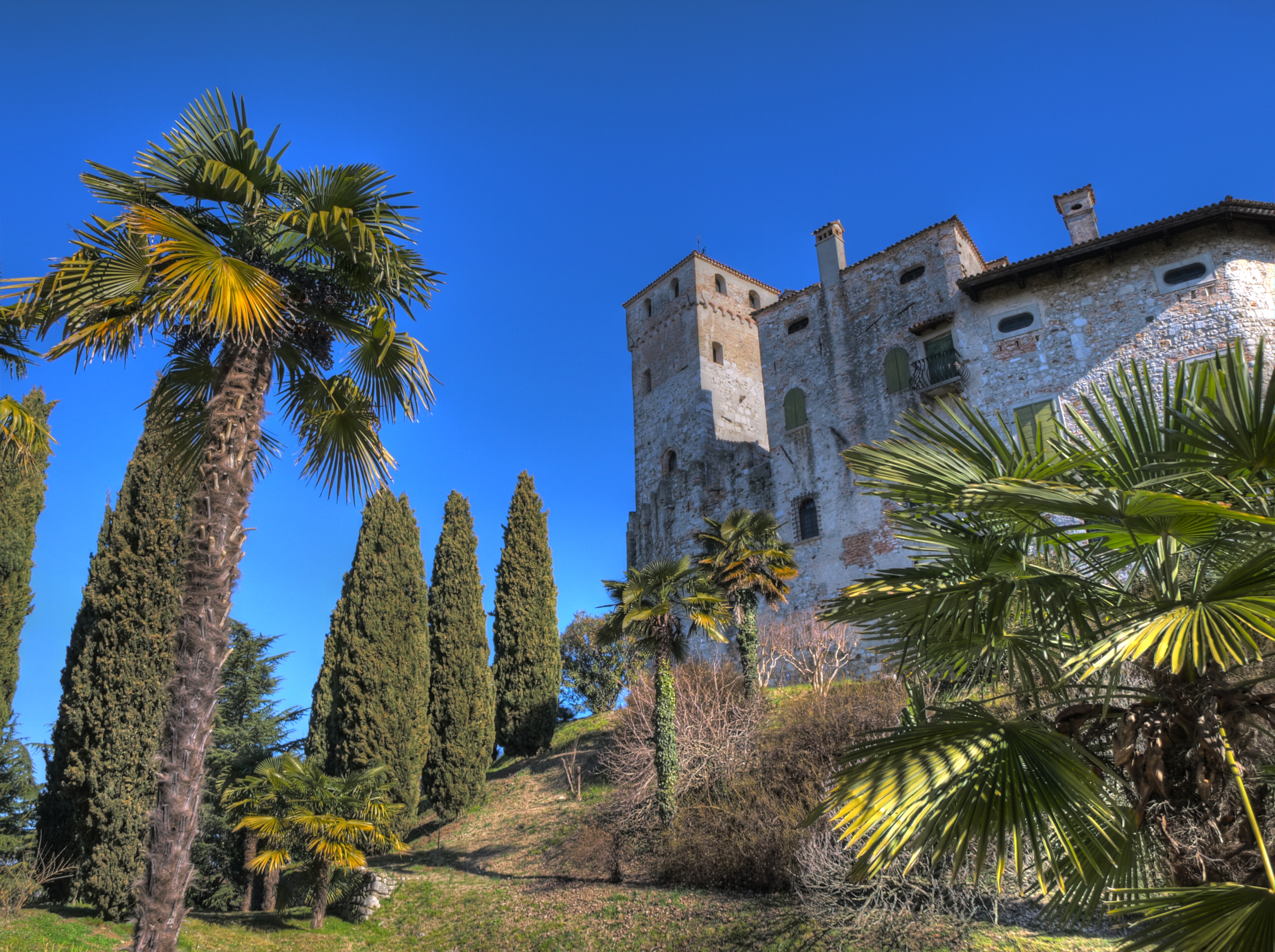
Villalta Castle

Over time, the family lost influence. Various branches spread across Lombardy (Como), Veneto (Verona), Friuli (residing at Villalta Castle near Fagagna from 1453 to 1905), and Piedmont (Alessandria); others moved to Carinthia, Carniola, and Bohemia. Some served the House of Savoy, while others served the Habsburgs. The Milanese churches of Santa Maria delle Grazie and Sant'Eustorgio house the 15th-century funerary chapels of the Milanese Torriani (descendants of Napoleone). In 1533, Emperor Charles V confirmed the family's ancient title of Count of Valsassina and granted the title of Baron of Vercelli to Girolamo − a descendant of Napoleone from the Udine line – as well as to his brothers and a cousin; Girolamo acquired estates in Moravia (Leipritz) and died in Venice in 1530. Napoleone's line became extinct in 1842 with the Counts della Torre di Madrisio (near Fagagna).

=== Gorizia Line ===
Duino castle, Italy

Francesco della Torre (1518–1565), of the Gorizia branch (descendants of Ermanno, Napoleone's eldest brother), was a councillor to Emperor Ferdinand I and became Imperial envoy to Venice in 1558; he was elevated to the rank of Imperial Baron of Thurn and Valsassina. His son Raimund married, in succession, two sisters of the Hofer von Hohenfels family – heiresses to Duino Castle – and in 1572 became an Imperial Count of Thurn-Hofer and Valsassina. The last descendant of this branch, Theresa Maria (d. 1893), bequeathed Duino to her daughter, Princess Marie von Thurn und Taxis, née Princess of Hohenlohe-Waldenburg, the patron of Rainer Maria Rilke. Princess Marie's son, Prince Alexander von Thurn und Taxis (later "Alessandro della Torre e Tasso"), became in 1934 1st Duke of Castel Duino in the Italian nobility (title created by King Victor Emmanuel III). The castle remains in the possession of her descendants to this day.

=== Carinthian branch ===
Another of Napoleone's brothers, Salvino, podestà of Vercelli, died after 1281, founded a line that reached Carinthia with his great-grandson Richard I of Thurn-Valsassina; there, the family intermarried with established landed noble houses and remains resident to this day on several estates in Carinthia and Lower Austria.

Made Barons zum Creutz by the Holy Roman Emperor in 1532, the Carinthian branch, called von Thurn und Valsassina-Como-Vercelli, became Imperial counts in 1541, acquiring Bleiburg castle in 1601, still the family seat. In 1552, they obtained the post of hereditary marshal in the County of Gorizia, where their ancestral nobility had been recognized in the person of Valveno della Torre in 1329. A later member of the Torriani, Girolamo, was named Count of Valsassina by Emperor Charles V, and held possessions in Moravia until he died in Venice in 1530. Francesco Torriani was counsellor of Emperor Ferdinand I and baron of the Holy Roman Empire: he was ambassador to Venice (1558). Carlo Torriani was governor of Trieste in 1666.

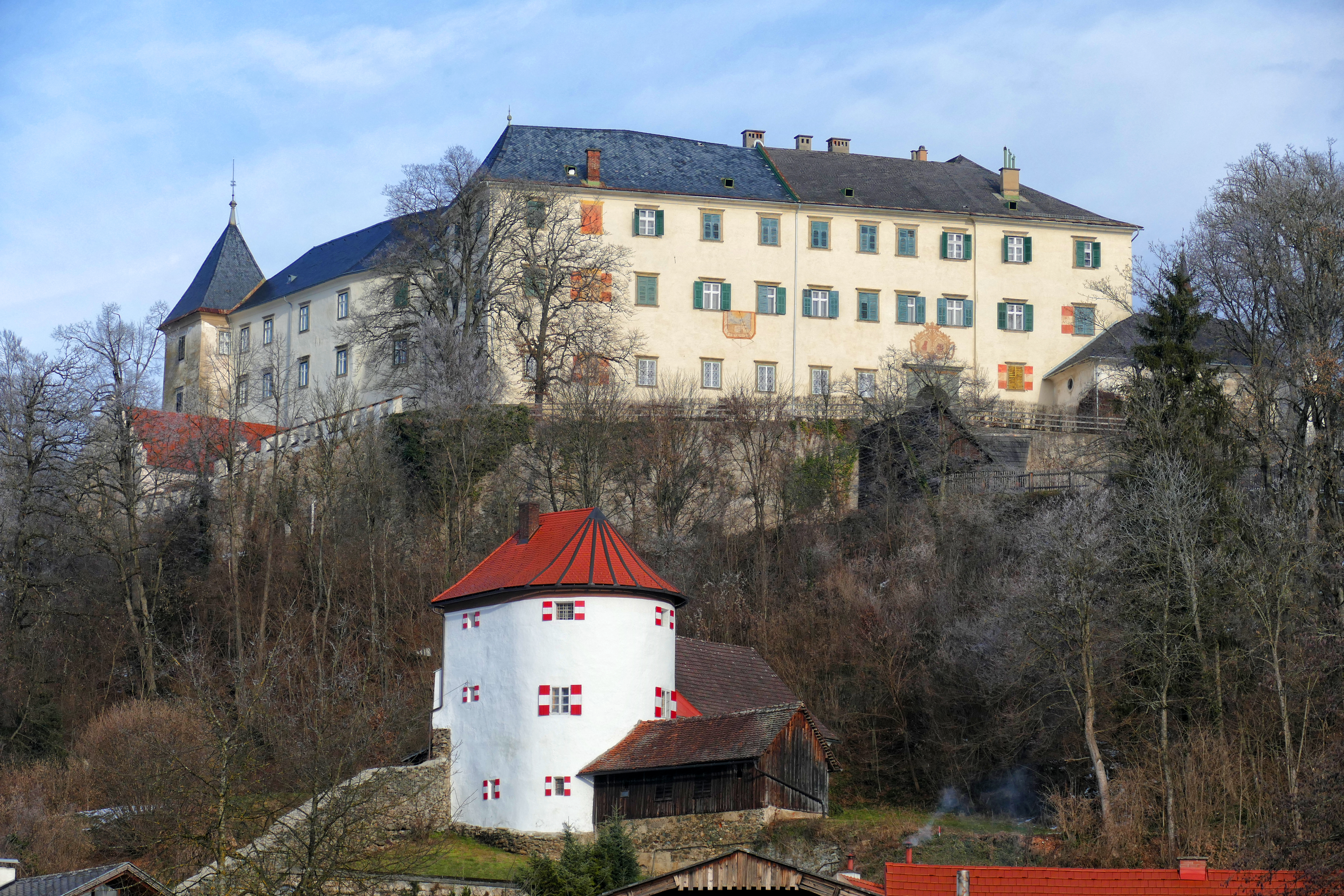
Schloss Bleiburg, family seat since 1601

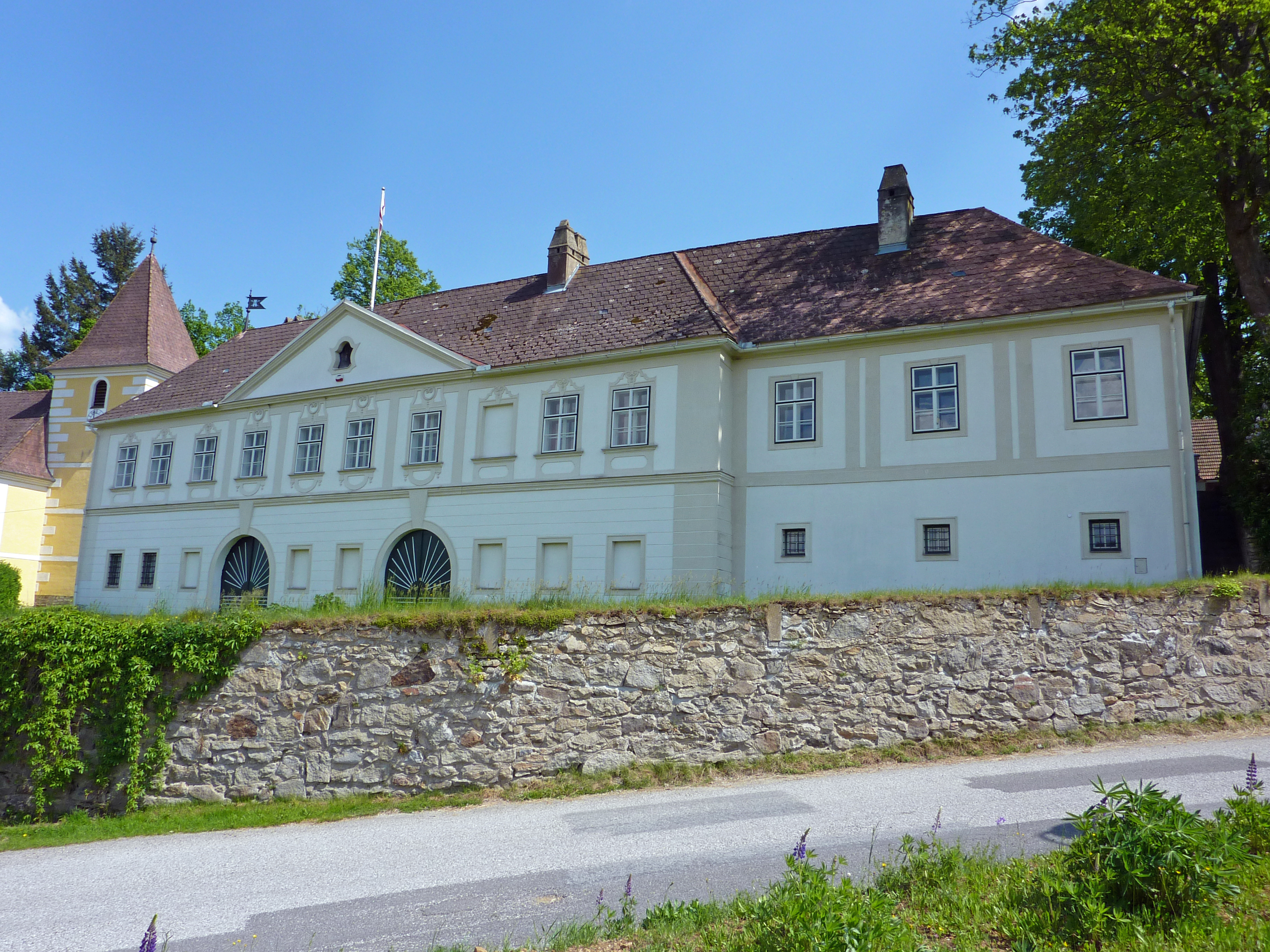
Schloss Niedernondorf, owned by the family since 1872

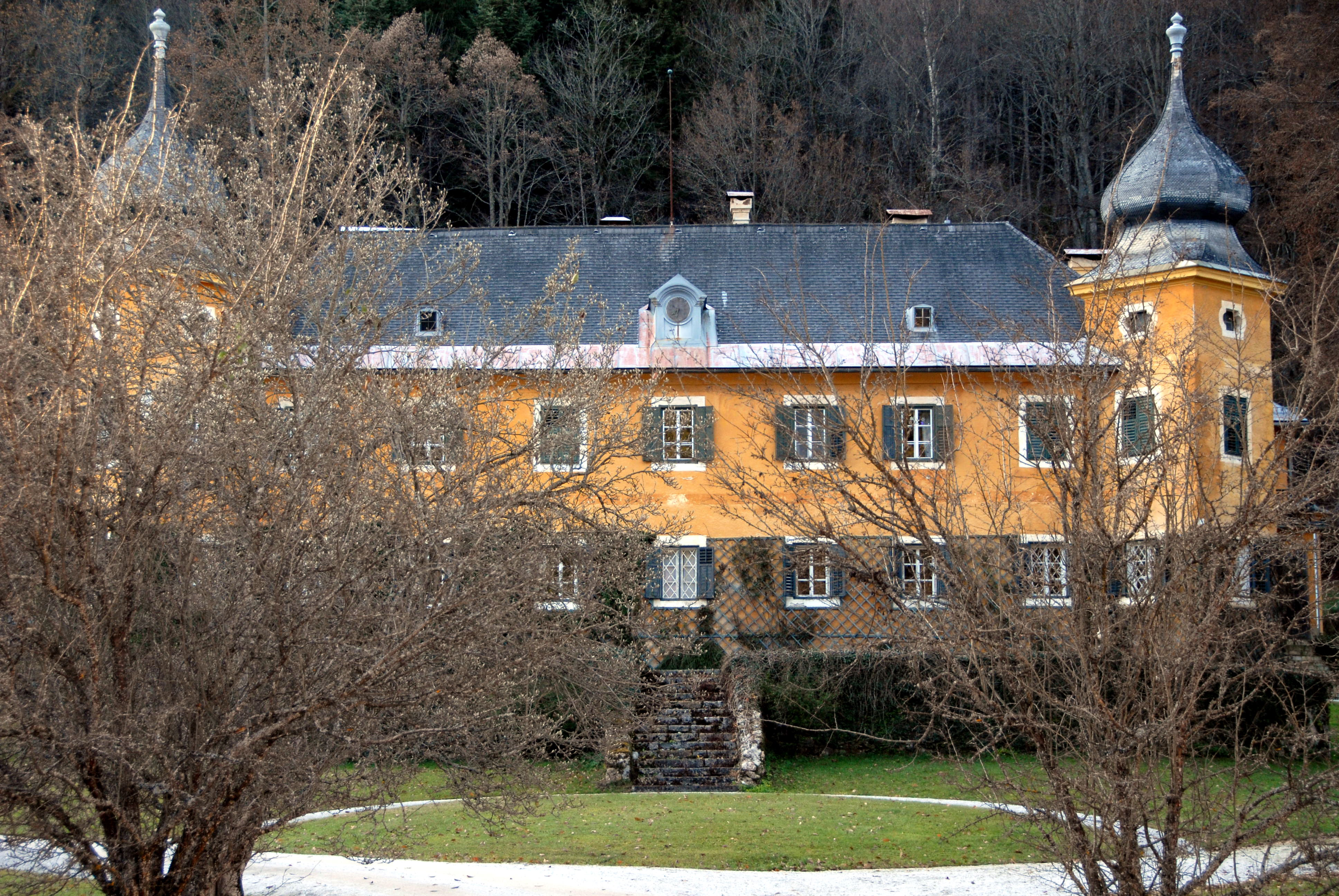
Schloss Hagenegg, owned by the family since 1887

== Other namesakes ==
Other families took on the name della Torre (or German von Thurn) without being male descendants of the Milan family like the countess Alexandrine von Taxis in 1650, changing the family name of her late husband's (and her son's) family to Thurn und Taxis, after having commissioned dubious genealogical derivations, primarily to acquire an illustrious lineage after being created counts, with according additions to the coat of arms, or cardinal Carlo Rezzonico, who in 1758 became Pope Clement XIII and who pursued similar motives with his adopted surname. It cannot even be conclusively proven that either family descended from the della Torre, even through the female line. The House of Thurn und Taxis was raised to the dignity of Prince of the Holy Roman Empire in 1695 by Leopold I, Holy Roman Emperor, only to be mediatised in 1806 after the dissolution of the Holy Roman Empire.

== Notable members ==
- Martino della Torre (died 1263), Italian condottiero
- Napoleone della Torre (died 1278), Lord of Milan
- Raimondo della Torre (died 1299), Patriarch of Aquileia
- Heinrich Matthias von Thurn und Valsassina (1567–1640), leader of the Protestant Bohemian Revolt
- Giovanni Maria Della Torre (1713–1782), Italian scientist
- Maria Antonietta Torriani, Italian writer who published as Marchesa Colombi
- Isabella von Thurn und Valsássina-Como-Vercelli (1962–1988), Princess of Hanover
