= Castello Baradello =

Military Fortification

Coordinates: 45°47′38″N 9°05′10″E

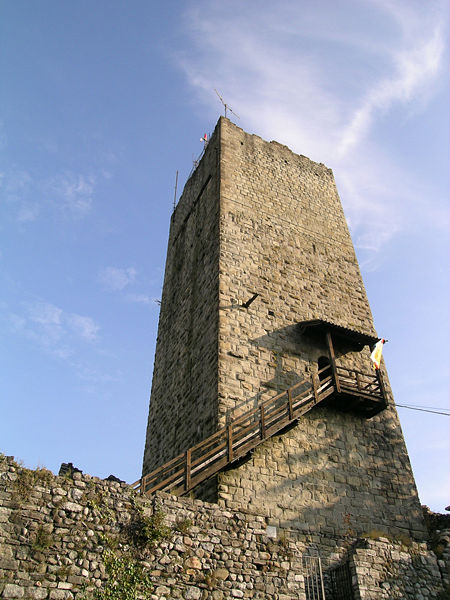
The watchtower.

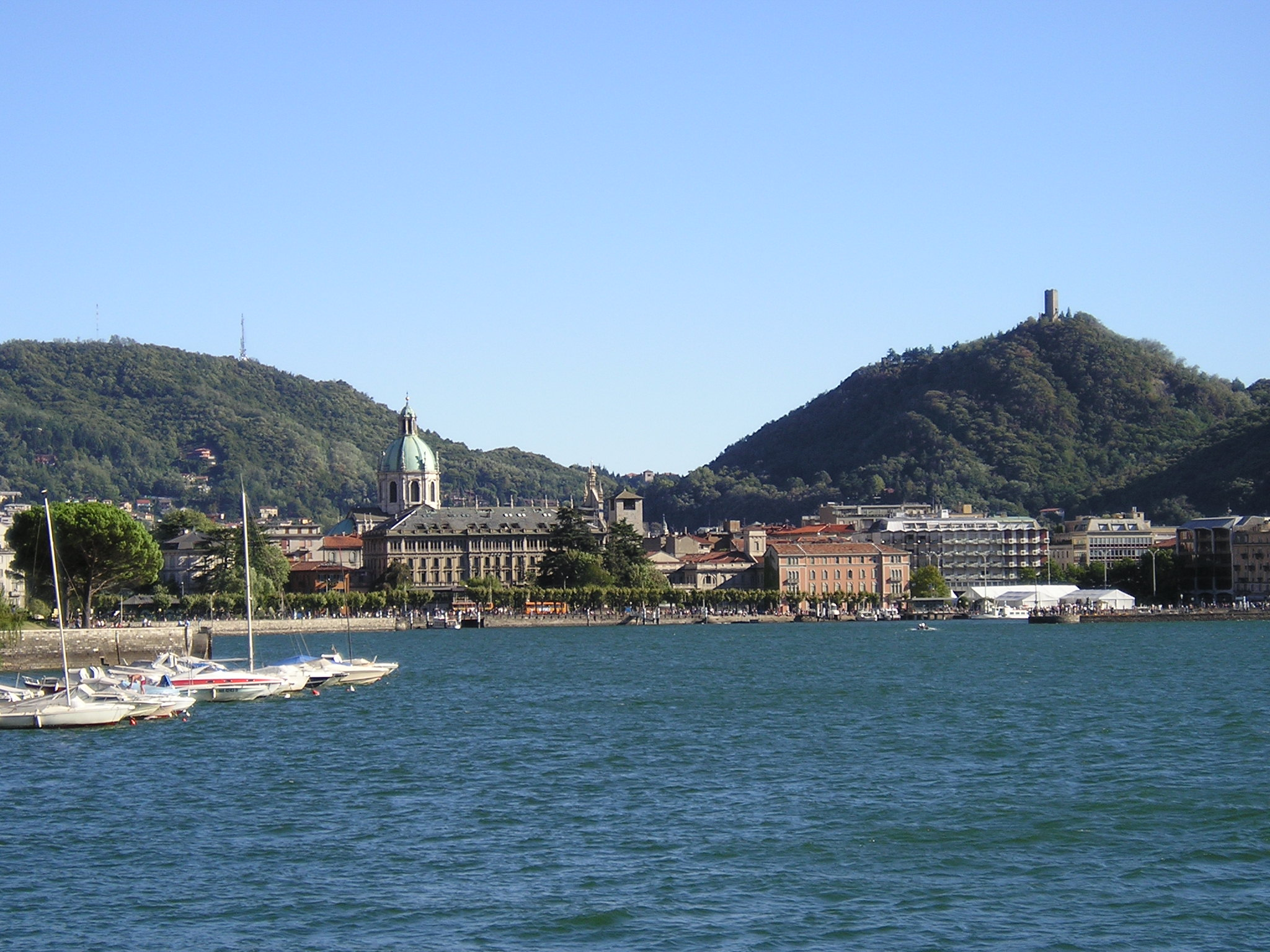
Castel Baradello, on the right, overlooking the city of Como.

The Castello Baradello is a military fortification located on a 430 m (1,410 ft) high hill next to the city of Como, northern Italy.

== History ==
The castle occupies the ancient site of Comum Oppidum, the original settlement of Como, dating from the 1st millennium BC. Later it was one of the last Byzantine strongholds in the area, surrendering to the Lombards in 588. The castle was restored during the War of the Lombard League, with the help of emperor Frederick Barbarossa (1158). Barbarossa officially donated it to the citizens of Como in 1178.

Napoleone della Torre died here in 1278, having been imprisoned here by Ottone Visconti after the Battle of Desio; his nephew Guido was able to escape in 1283, as well as his brothers Corrado and Enrico the following year. Azzone Visconti restored and enlarged the fortification after conquering Como in 1335, and built another castle, the Castello della Torre Rotonda ("Castle of the Round Tower", now lost) and a citadel.

In 1527, by order of emperor Charles V, the castle was dismantled, with the exception of the tower, to prevent it from falling in hands of the French troops that had invaded the duchy of Milan. After belonging to monks and then to private individuals, the castle was restored in 1971.

== Description ==
The most preserved element is a square tower, measuring 8.20 m × 8.35 m (26.9 ft × 27.4 ft) at the base, and standing at 27.50 m (90.2 ft). It once had Guelph-type merlons. The walls are of Byzantine origin (6th-7th century); these were later heightened and provided with Guelph merlons, while another external line of walls was added.

Also from the 6th century are the Chapel of St. Nicholas and quadrangular tower (4.40 m × 4.15 m (14.4 ft × 13.6 ft) at the base), which was used as the castellan's residence. Napoleone della Torre was buried in the Chapel of St. Nicholas.

== Sources ==
- Belloni, L. M. (1980). Il Castello Baradello. Como.
