= Napoleone della Torre =

Lord of Milan (died 1278)

- Lord of Milan
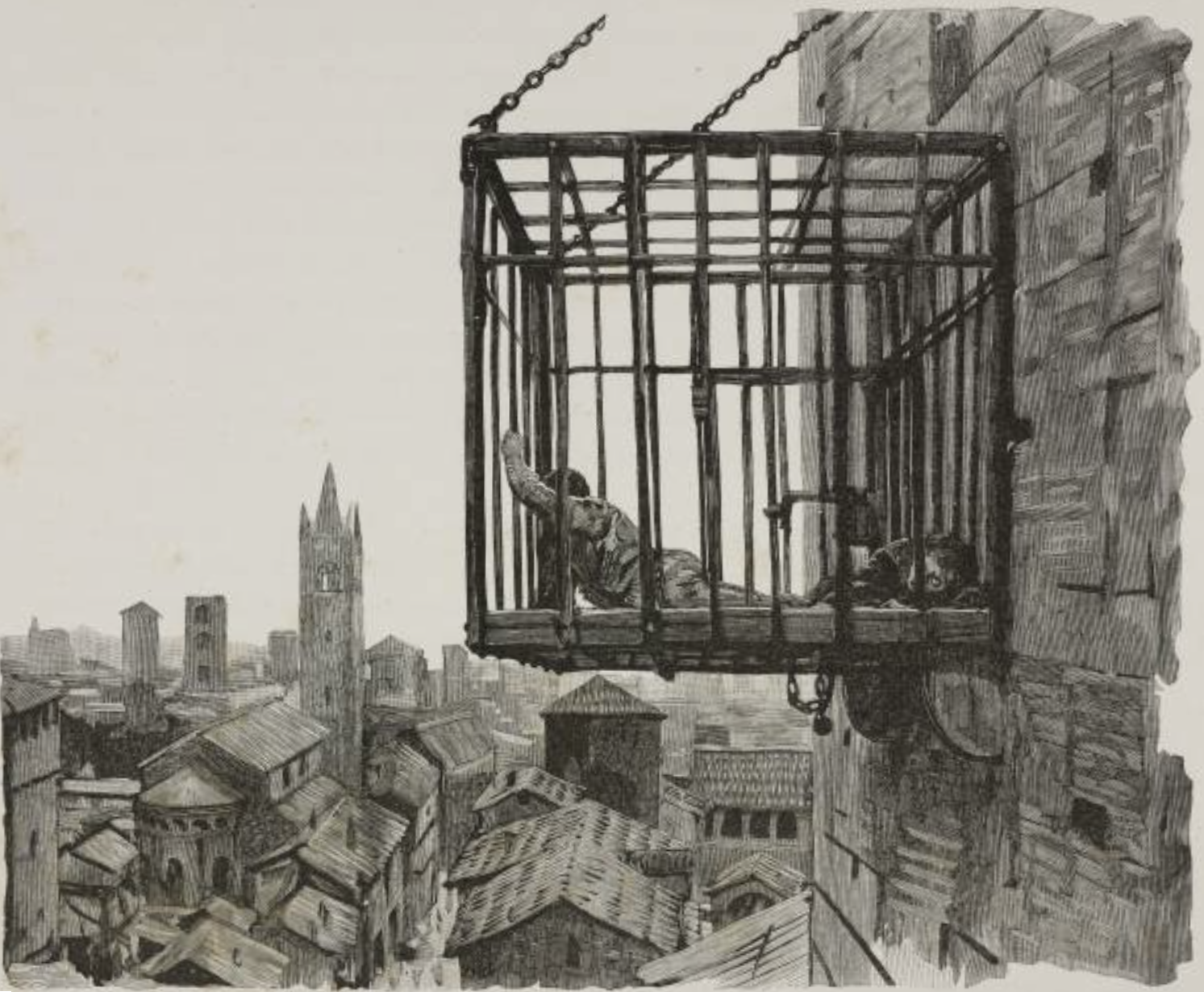
- Reign: 1265–1277
- Other titles: Podestà of Piacenza (1260); Anziano del Popolo of Milan (from 1265); Podestà of Como, Novara, Bergamo and Lodi (from 1265); Imperial vicar in Lombardy (1274)
- Died: 16 August 1278; Castel Baradello, Como
- Buried: Church of St Nicholas, Castel Baradello, Como
- Noble family: Della Torre
- Issue: Corrado della Torre
- Father: Pagano I della Torre

Napoleone della Torre (died 16 August 1278), also known as Napo della Torre or Napo Torriani, was an Italian nobleman, who was effective Lord of Milan in the late 13th century. He was a member of the della Torre family, the father of Corrado della Torre and the brother of Raimondo della Torre.

== Early life ==
Napoleone was the son of Pagano I della Torre.

== Career ==
In 1260 he was podestà of Piacenza.

He took power in Milan in 1265, succeeding his cousin Filippo as Anziano del Popolo ("Elder of the People") and, at the same time, podestà of Como, Novara, Bergamo and Lodi. He continued the family policy of support of Charles of Anjou and the Guelph party against the Ghibellines and the Kingdom of Sicily.

The Angevin victory at Benevento of the following year meant a triumph of the Guelphs in Italy; in 1267, the main members of the party met in Milan to renew the league against the new Ghibelline leader, the German Conradin. Napo was named commander of the league together with his brother Raimondo and William VII of Montferrat. Napo, however, did not attack Conradin, who was in Pavia, perhaps due to personal problems with the Papacy. After Conradin's death in the battle of Tagliacozzo (1268) and his definitive conquest of southern Italy, Charles of Anjou tried to extend his power to the whole peninsula: Napo refused to support his moves, provoking Angevin revenge in the form of rebellions against him.

In 1269, his brother Raimondo, bishop of Como, was captured by Conrad Venosta von Matsch (a minor vassal of Valchiavenna); Napo intervened and freed him in 1273. In the same year, after the election of Rudolph of Habsburg as Holy Roman Emperor, Napo switched to the imperial party in order to counter the dominance of Charles of Anjou. His reward was the title of imperial vicar in Lombardy (1274).

At this point,Ottone Visconti (who had been named archbishop of Milan in 1262 but had never been able to enter his seat), and now the main exponent of the opposition in Milan and in Brianza against the Della Torre, waged war against him. Napo initially defeated Visconti's troops in the battle of Guazzera (near Lake Maggiore), but, on 21 January 1277, he was beaten and captured in the battle of Desio together with his son Corrado and his nephew Guido. His imprisonment marked the end of della Torre's rule in Milan, replaced by the Visconti, who held it until the 15th century.

== Imprisonment and death ==
Napo della Torre was held in a cage hanging outside the tower at Castel Baradello at Como, where he remained for 19 months until his death in 1278. He was buried in the church of St. Nicholas in the castle.

== See also ==
- Wars of Guelphs and Ghibellines
