= Raimondo della Torre =

Italian clergyman (died 1299)

- Patriarch of Aquileia
- Church: Catholic Church
- Archdiocese: Patriarchate of Aquileia
- Appointed: 21 December 1273
- In office: 1273–1299
- Predecessor: Philip of Spanheim
- Successor: Konrad II the Hunchback
- Other posts: Archpriest of Monza (1251–1262); Archbishop of Milan (1261–1262; nominal); Bishop of Como (1262–1274)

Personal details
- Died: 23 February 1299
- Buried: Basilica of Aquileia

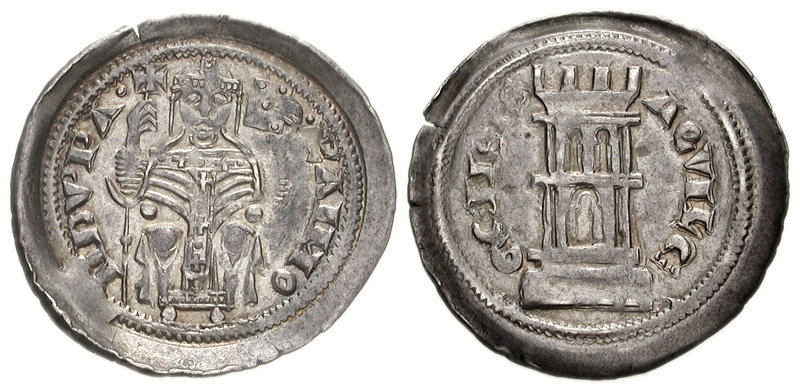
Denaro of Raimondo della Torre; the family's symbol, a torre, is on the verso.

Raimondo della Torre (died 23 February 1299) was an Italian clergyman who was patriarch of Aquileia from 1273 until his death.

== Early life ==
By birth member of the House of Della Tore, a Guelph noble family that ruled Milan, he was the son of Pagano I della Torre (1175–1241), Lord of Milan and Valsassina and his wife, Agathe of Genève (born 1179). Raimundo's brother was Napo della Torre.

== Career ==
He was archpriest of Monza in 1251–1262, archbishop of Milan in 1261–1262 (though only named), and bishop of Como from 1262 to 1274.

In 1269, he was captured by Conrad Von Matsch, lord of the castle of Boffalora near Madesimo, and publicly exhibited in a cage at Sondalo in Valtellina. Napo's troops freed him and destroyed the castle on 25 September 1273.

A leading exponent of the Guelph (pro-papal) side in the struggle between papacy, the Holy Roman Emperor and the Italian communes, Raimondo was appointed as patriarch/lord of Aquileia on 21 December 1273. After the battle of Desio, the defeated members of the della Torre family took shelter under him in Friuli.

During his tenure as patriarch, he constantly warred against the nearby Republic of Venice, first in the conflict for Capodistria (1274–1279) and then for Trieste (1283–1291). After raising an army of some 45,000 infantry and 5,000 horsemen, he was able to storm the fortress of Moccò in 1289, and after the peace of Treviso (1291), he annexed Trieste to the patriarchate. He later pushed back an assault by the Da Camino of Treviso and suppressed several rebellions of his vassals. In 1297, he also quenched a rebellion of the counts of Gorizia.

== Death ==
Raimondo died in 1299 and was buried in the basilica of Aquileia.

Catholic Church titles
Preceded by Philip of Spanheim	Patriarch of Aquileia; 1273-1299	Succeeded by Konrad II the Hunchback
