= Rulers of Milan =

Rulers of Milan may refer to:

- Lord of Milan (1259–1395)
- List of dukes of Milan (1395–1814)
