= Castiglione =

Castiglione may refer to:

== Places ==
=== Italy ===
Many of which were simply called Castiglione prior to the unification of Italy in the 19th century:

Abruzzo

- Castiglione a Casauria, in the province of Pescara
- Castiglione della Valle (now Colledara), in the province of Teramo
- Castiglione Messer Marino, in the province of Chieti
- Castiglione Messer Raimondo, in the province of Teramo

Calabria

- Castiglione Cosentino, in the province of Cosenza
- Castiglione Marittimo, in the province of Catanzaro

Campania

- Castiglione del Genovesi, in the province of Salerno

Emilia-Romagna

- Castiglione dei Pepoli, in the province of Bologna

Lazio

- Castiglione in Teverina, in the province of Viterbo

Lombardia

- Castiglione d'Adda, in the province of Lodi
- Castiglione delle Stiviere, in the province of Mantova - also the site of the Battle of Castiglione
- Castiglione d'Intelvi, in the province of Como
- Castiglione Olona, in the province of Varese

Liguria

- Castiglione Chiavarese, in the province of Genoa

Piedmont

- Castiglione Falletto, in the province of Cuneo
- Castiglione Tinella, in the province of Cuneo
- Castiglione Torinese, in the province of Torino

Sicily

- Castiglione di Sicilia, in the province of Catania

Tuscany

- Castiglion Fibocchi, in the province of Arezzo
- Castiglion Fiorentino, in the province of Arezzo
- Castiglione della Pescaia, in the province of Grosseto
- Castiglione di Garfagnana, in the province of Lucca
- Castiglione d'Orcia, in the province of Siena

Umbria

- Castiglione del Lago, in the province of Perugia

=== Corsica ===
- Castiglione, Haute-Corse, a commune of the Haute-Corse département in France, on the island of Corsica

=== Algeria ===
- Bou Ismaïl, known under French colonial rule as Castiglione

== People ==
- Castiglione (surname)
- Virginia Oldoini, Countess of Castiglione

== See also ==
- Castiglioni
- Castigliano
- Castione (disambiguation)
