= Castiglioni =

Castiglioni is an Italian surname. People with this surname include:

- Giannino Castiglioni (1884–1971), Italian artist
- Achille Castiglioni (1918–2002), Italian architect and industrial designer
- Livio Castiglioni (1911–1979), Italian architect and industrial designer
- Pier Giacomo Castiglioni (1913–1968), Italian architect and industrial designer
- Francesco Saverio Castiglioni (1761–1830), Pope Pius VIII
- Goffredo da Castiglione / Godfrey Castiglioni (died 1241), Pope Celestine IV
- St. Buono Castiglioni (818–822), Bishop of Milan
- St. Honoratus Castiglioni (568–572), Bishop of Milan
- Teresa Ciceri Castiglioni (1750–1821) was an Italian inventor, agronomist
- Arturo Castiglioni (1874–1952), Italian-American medical historian
- Camillo Castiglioni (1879–1961), Austrian financier and banker
- Consuelo Castiglioni, b. 1959, Chilean-Italian fashion designer
- Luis Alberto Castiglioni Soria, former vice president of Paraguay
- Niccolò Castiglioni (1932–1996), Italian composer and pianist

== See also ==
- Palazzo Castiglioni (disambiguation)
- The Castiglioni Brothers (film)
- Castigliano
- Castiglione (disambiguation)
- Castiglione (surname)
- Via Fratelli Castiglioni (street in Milan named after Achille, Livio, and Pier Giacomo Castiglioni)
