= Palazzo Castiglioni =

The Castiglioni were a prominent family from the Lombard aristocracy since the 10th Century. Several buildings that were the property of this family are named Palazzo Castiglioni, including:

- Palazzo Castiglioni (Milan)
- Palazzo Castiglioni (Cingoli), Marche
- Palazzo Bonacolsi (formerly Palazzo Castiglioni), Mantua
