= Palazzo Bonacolsi =

Building in Mantua, Italy

Coordinates: 45°09′36″N 10°47′47″E

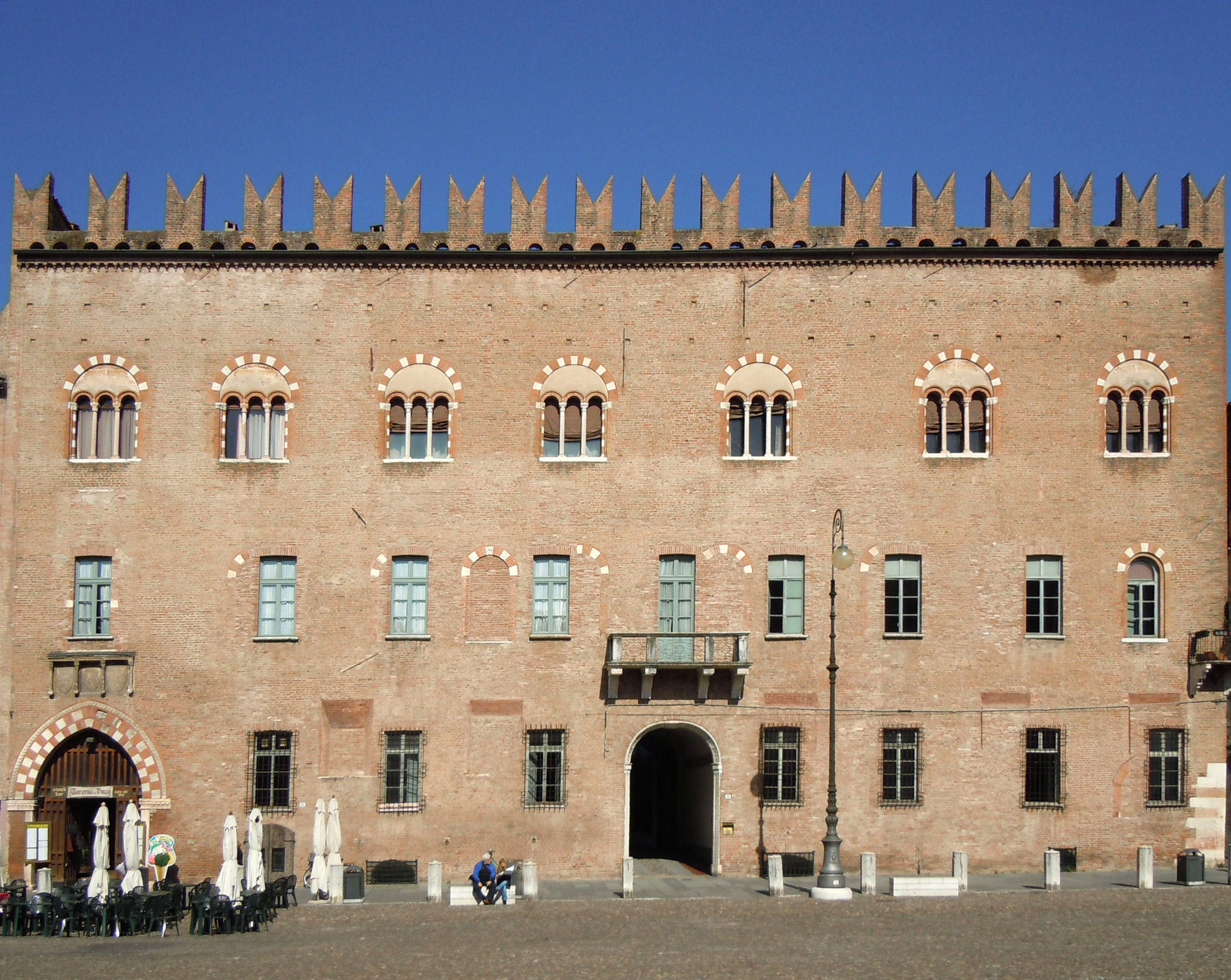
Mantua, Palazzo Bonacolsi.

The Palazzo Bonacolsi, also known as Palazzo Castiglioni, is a 13th-century Gothic-style aristocratic palace located in the center of the town in Piazza Sordello in front of the Ducal Palace in Mantua, region of Lombardy, Italy.

== History ==
The Bonacolsi family ruled Mantua during the thirteenth century, until on August 16, 1328, when the Rinaldo Bonacolsi was overthrown in a revolt backed by the Ludovico Gonzaga I, who seized power.

The Castiglioni had been one of the most prominent Lombard aristocratic families since the 10th century. Most of the members were traditionally based in Milan: the Mantuan branch originated in 1440 from Baldassarre Castiglione the elder, the grandfather of author of the Libro del Cortigiano. Another descendant, also with the name Baldassare bought the palace in 1804.

== History ==
The roofline of the brick palace is topped by Ghibelline battlements. The top floor has mullioned windows. The palace was built in the late thirteenth century by the Pinamonte Bonacolsi on land purchased from Rolandino de Pacis. Pinamonte also bought adjacent palaces and buildings in civitas vetus, including the tower of the cage, symbol of the power of Bonacolsi. The most prestigious palace was left by his father to his second son Bardellone, his successor as leader of the city.

Bonacolsi family ruled Mantua during the thirteenth century until, August 16, 1328, the last Bonacolsi, Rinaldo, was overthrown in a revolt backed by Luigi Gonzaga, who also took property of the palace. From 1479 to 1487 was the home town of the Countess of Rodigo Antonia del Balzo, wife of Gianfrancesco Gonzaga, founder of the Gonzaga Sabbioneta and Bozzolo.

The building is also part of the mighty tower house, located in the adjacent lane, built by Pinamonte Bonacolsi in 1280 about protection of the buildings owned by the family in the central piazza San Pietro.
