= Castione (disambiguation) =

Castione is a Swiss village in Ticino. It may also refer to some places in Italy:

- Castione Andevenno, a municipality of the Province of Sondrio, Lombardy
- Castione della Presolana, a municipality of the Province of Bergamo, Lombardy
- Castione (Bergamo), in Lombardy region of northern Italy
- Castione (Brentonico), a hamlet of Brentonico (TN), Trentino-Südtirol
- Castione (Loria), a hamlet of Loria (TV), Veneto
- Castione dei Marchesi, a hamlet of Fidenza (PR), Emilia-Romagna

== See also ==
- Castiglione (disambiguation)
- Battle of Castione, a battle of 1449 between the Golden Ambrosian Republic and the canton of Uri
