= Rocca Borromeo di Angera =

Building in Angera, Italy

Rocca Borromeo
- Angera, Lombardy in Italy
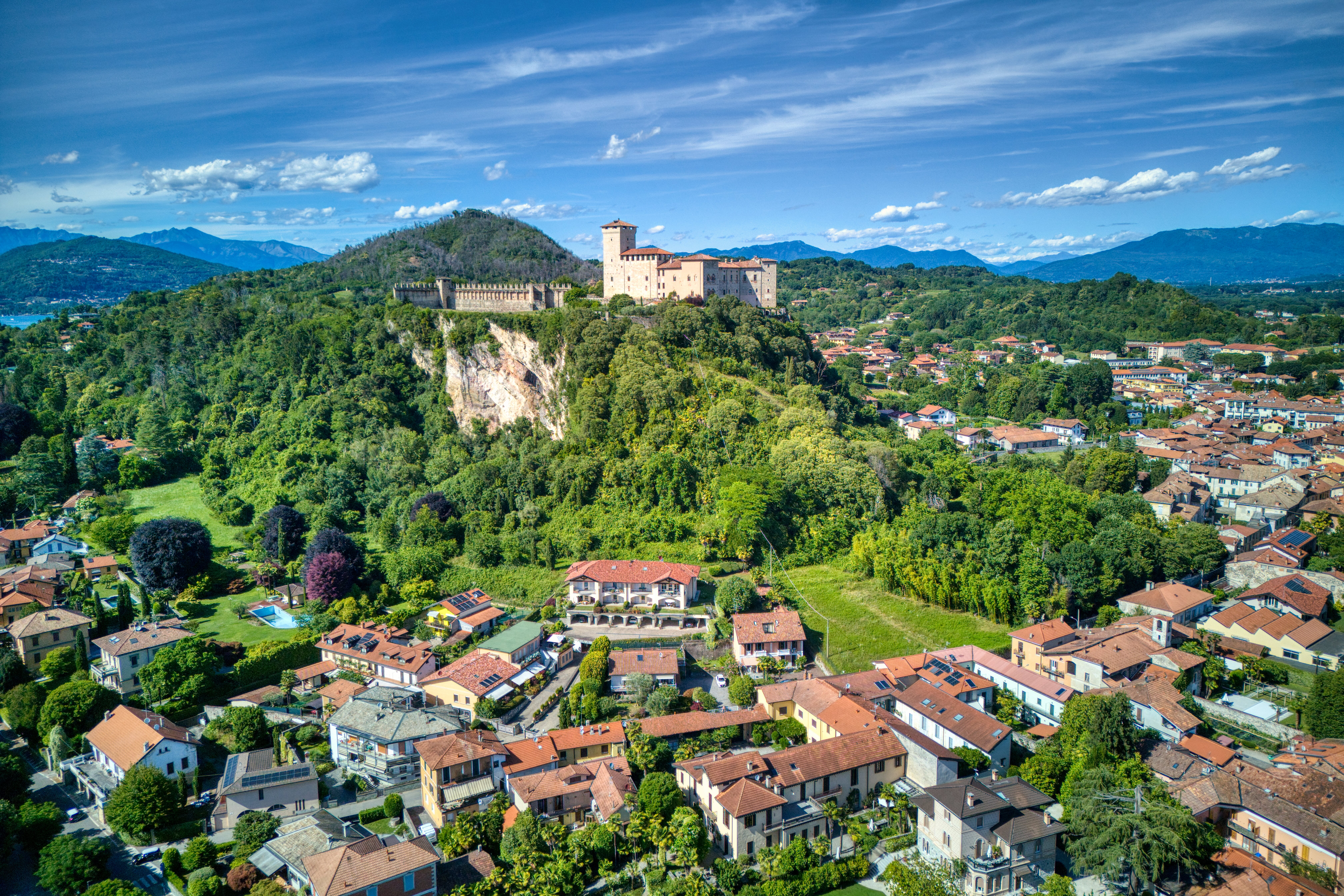

Site information
- Type: Rocca
- Owner: House of Borromeo
- Open to the public: Yes (daily from mid-April to September, Friday to Sunday from mid-March to mid-April)
- Condition: Excellent

Location
- Location within Northern Italy
- Coordinates: 45°46′27″N 8°34′17″E

Site history
- Built: 13th and 14th centuries
- Built by: Ottone Visconti, Bernabò Visconti, and House of Borromeo
- Materials: Local stone

The Rocca Borromeo di Angera, or Rocca d'Angera, also called Borromeo Castle, is a rocca on a hilltop above the town of Angera in the Province of Varese on the southern shores of Lago Maggiore. It has medieval origins and initially belonged to the Milanese archbishop. It passed then to the Visconti of Milan and later to the Borromeos, who are still the owners.

It is visible across the lake from Arona, where the remains of another castle with the same property history, the Rocca di Arona, stand.

The fortress comprises four parts, built in different periods, that enclose an internal courtyard. On the northeastern side, a wall with corner turrets extends outside the building and bends towards the lake until the edge of the cliff enclosing a garden.

== History ==
=== Origins ===
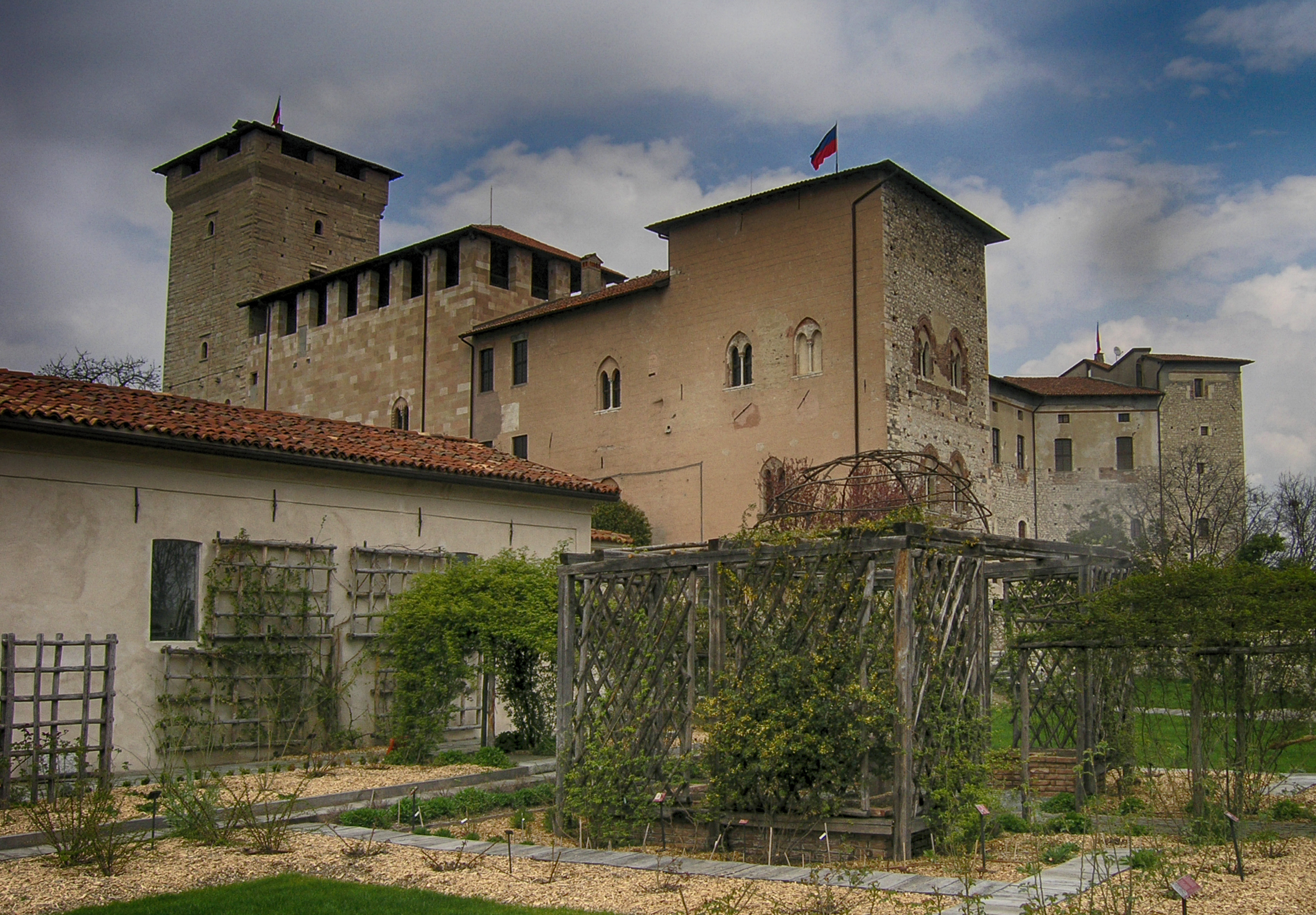
General view of the different parts forming the castle

The origin of the Rocca traces back to an early medieval watchtower, around which the other parts of the building later developed. The tower belonged to the Milanese church, and in the 13th century, it was the refuge of Archbishop Leone da Perego after being forced to flee Milan by the city faction led by the Della Torre family.

=== Visconti period ===
The Della Torre were defeated by the Visconti family, leader of the party of the Milanese nobility, in the battle of Desio in 1277. Ottone Visconti, archbishop and first lord of Milan, expanded the fortress, adding a new wing today called the Ottonian or Visconti wing. After Ottone's death, the Viscontis took possession of the Rocca and other properties belonging to the Milanese church. They paid great attention to Angera because they considered it their legendary place of origin.

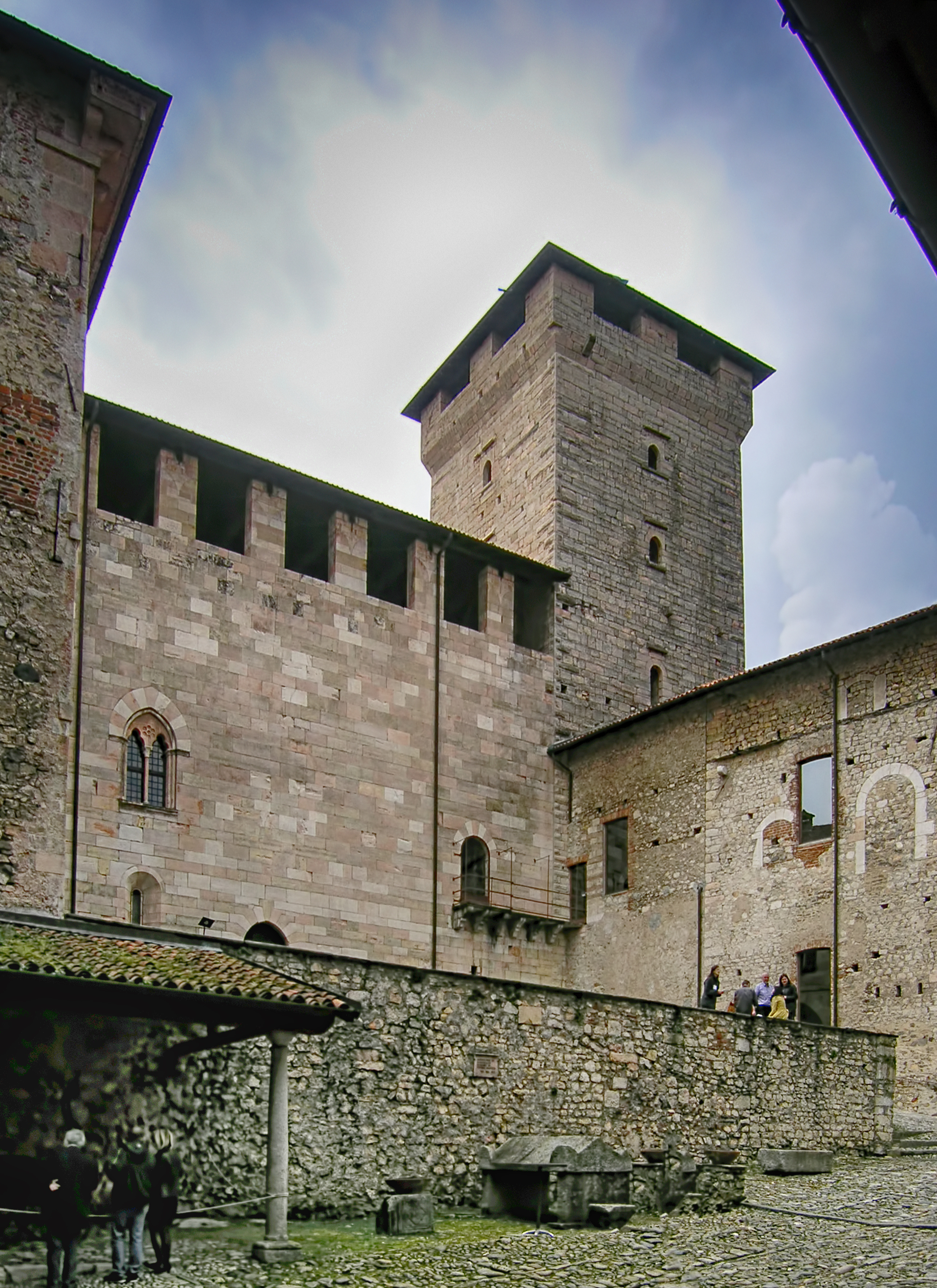
The keep and the Ottonian wing on the left

Entirely built in squared and smooth local stone, the Ottonian wing is an excellent example of 13th-century residential architecture. It has a front marked by simple narrow windows on the ground floor and mullioned windows on the upper floor. The body of the building was erected against the ancient keep, closing off the original access to the keep.

The Ottonian wing contains the Hall of Justice, decorated by an unknown painter with frescoes representing episodes from the life of Archbishop Ottone Visconti, his victory against the Della Torre, and the subsequent pacification of Milan. The frescoes were probably commissioned by Ottone's nephew, Matteo Visconti, to celebrate his memory. They underline the magnanimity of Ottone Visconti and his will to peacefully obtain the city's government, as shown by the constant presence of the Christian cross above his head. Astrological symbols accompany Ottone's events in the upper part of the wall. The frescoes had to cover the six sides of the Hall of Justice to house all twelve zodiacal signs. A wall, whose frescoes have partly survived, shows the Wheel of Fortune to symbolize the alternation of events that saw the Della Torre pass from dominating the city of Milan to their defeat.

Between 1375 and 1385, for his wife Regina Della Scala, Bernabò Visconti built a third wing known as Ala Scaligera (Della Scala wing).

=== Borromeo period ===
The political instabilities in Milan following the death of Gian Galeazzo Visconti (1402) led to the loss of the direct influence of the dukes of Milan over Angera. Initially, Gaspare Visconti of Uberto, a powerful count of nearby Arona and a distant cousin of the dukes, took advantage of it, obtaining rights over Angera town and perhaps its castle.

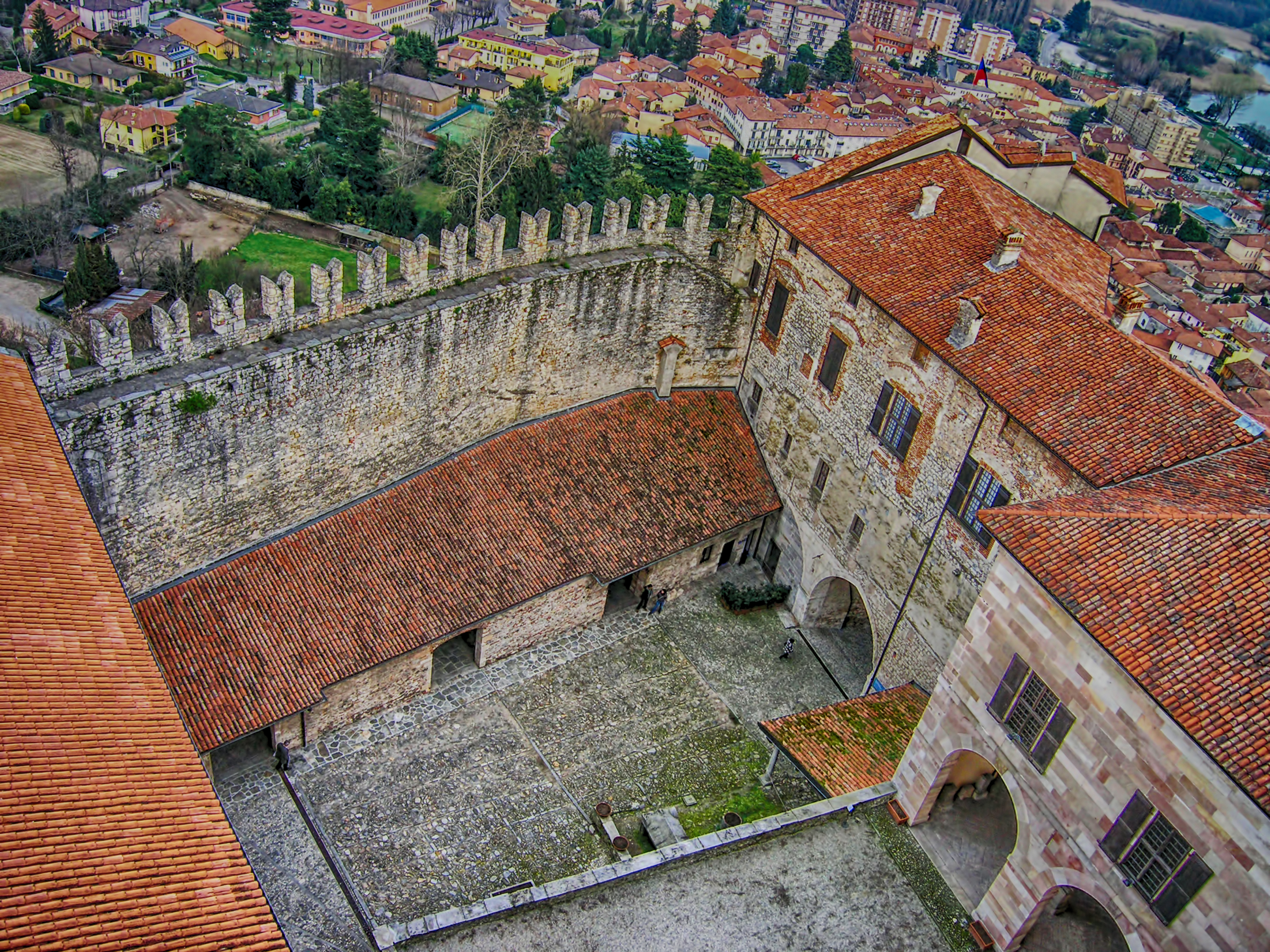
Internal courtyard

In 1439 Duke Filippo Maria, trying to cancel the domain of Gaspare's descendants over the southern portion of Lake Maggiore, ceded Arona to his treasurer Vitaliano Borromeo, a descendant of a wealthy family of Paduan and Tuscan merchants and bankers. Ten years later, in 1449, the new count of Arona acquired jurisdiction over Angera for 12,800 lire. From that moment, Angera became a part of the small state the Borromeos were building around Lake Maggiore. Except for the brief period after 1497, when Angera returned under the direct control of the Sforzas, new dukes of Milan, the Rocca di Angera always belonged to the Borromeos, who still hold it today.

The fourth building, which is called the Borromean wing, closes the Rocca to the southeast. Initially built by the Visconti, it was transformed between 1564 and 1631 during the Borromean period.

== Today ==
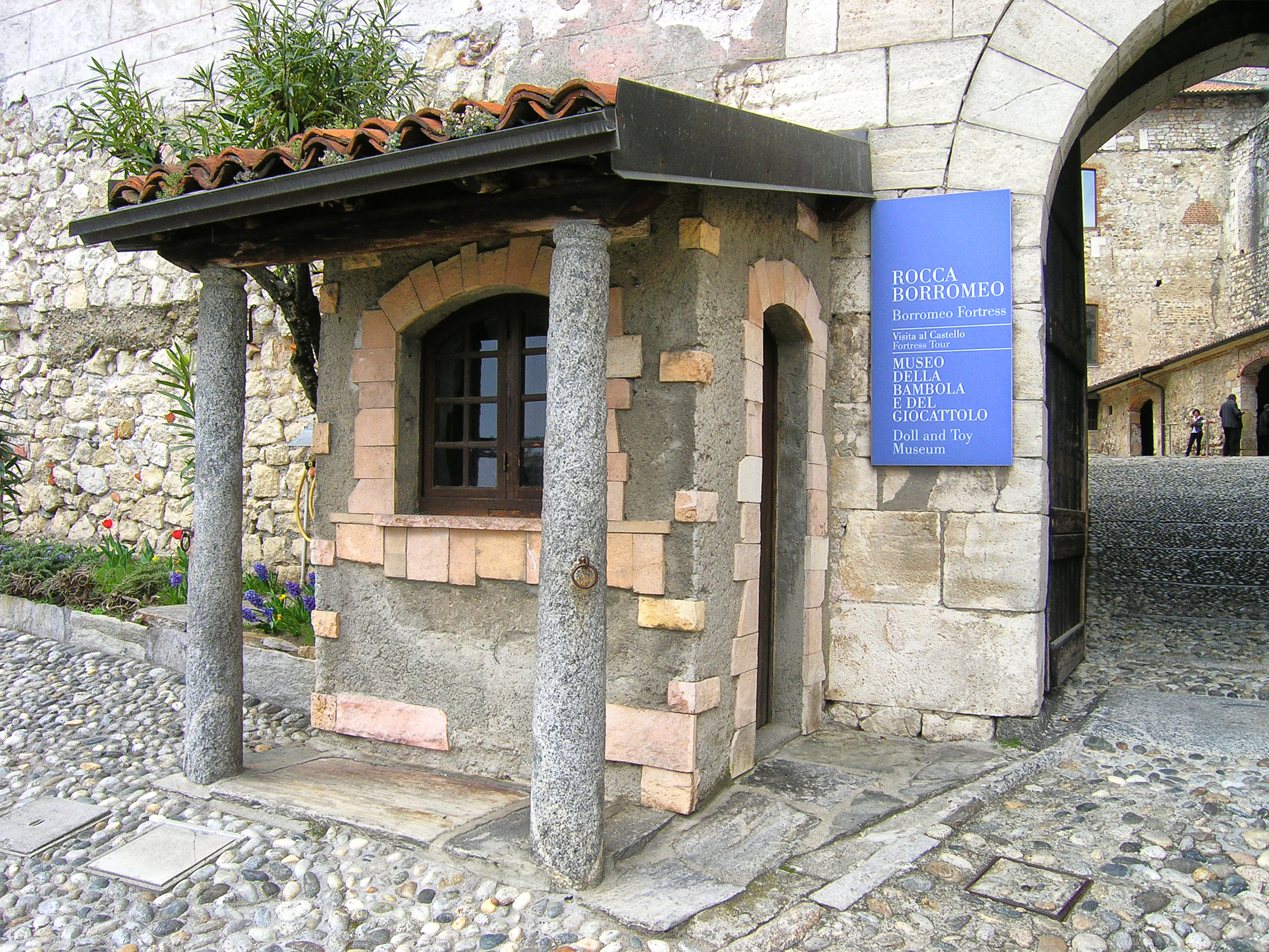
Entrance

Rocca di Angera is today in excellent condition and opens for visitors. The internal courtyard (Corte Nobile) is the castle's first part after the entrance. The nearby former stables house a mighty winepress, considered one of the largest in Europe.

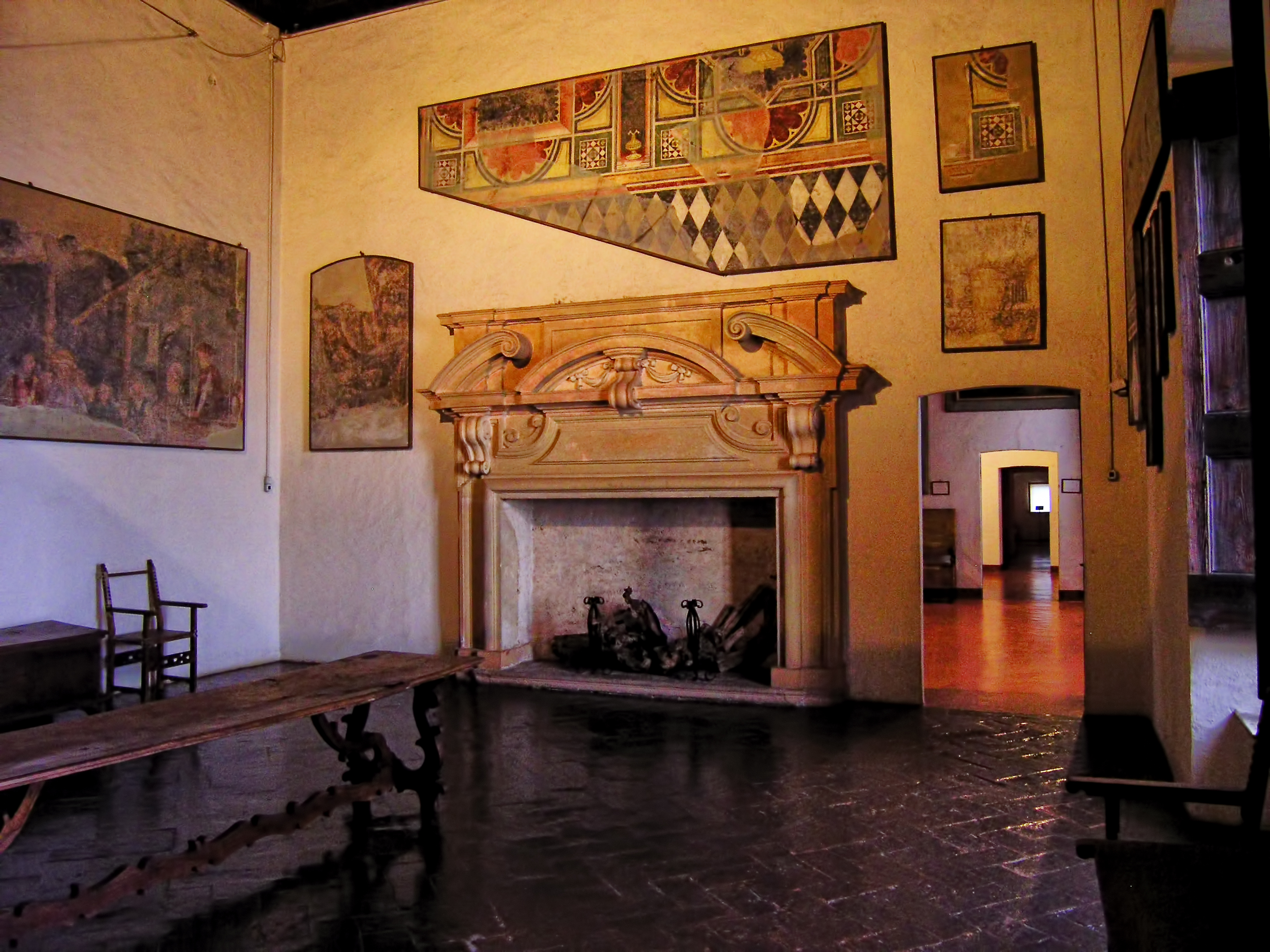
Hall of the ceremonies

The Rocca is best known for the Hall of Justice with its significant frescos. Two other rooms are the Sala delle Cerimonie (Hall of the Ceremonies), with 15th-century frescoes recovered from the Palazzo Borromeo in Milan after the bombings of the Second World War, and the Sala dei Fasti Borromeo (Hall of the Borromean Splendors), containing paintings glorifying the Borromeo family.

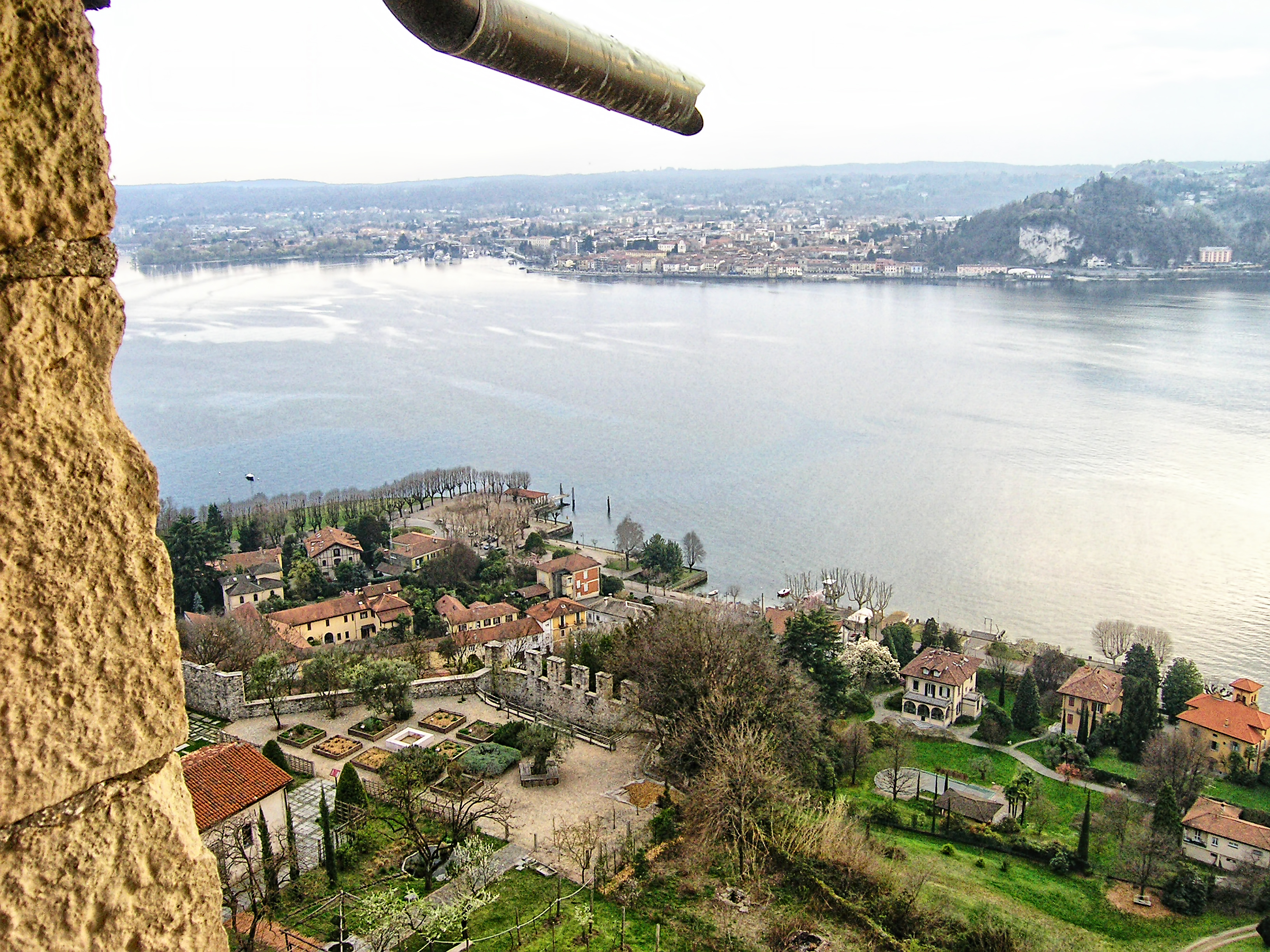
View of the lake from the tower

The castle also contains a Museo della Bambola e del Giocattolo (Museum of the Doll and Toy), founded in 1988 by Princess Bona Borromeo Arese, displaying over a thousand dolls from all over the world made between the 18th century and the present day. The keep offers a broad view of the southern Lake Maggiore region.

Externally, toward the lake, a medieval garden stands with medicinal plants, aromatic herbs, and a vineyard.

Hall of Justice
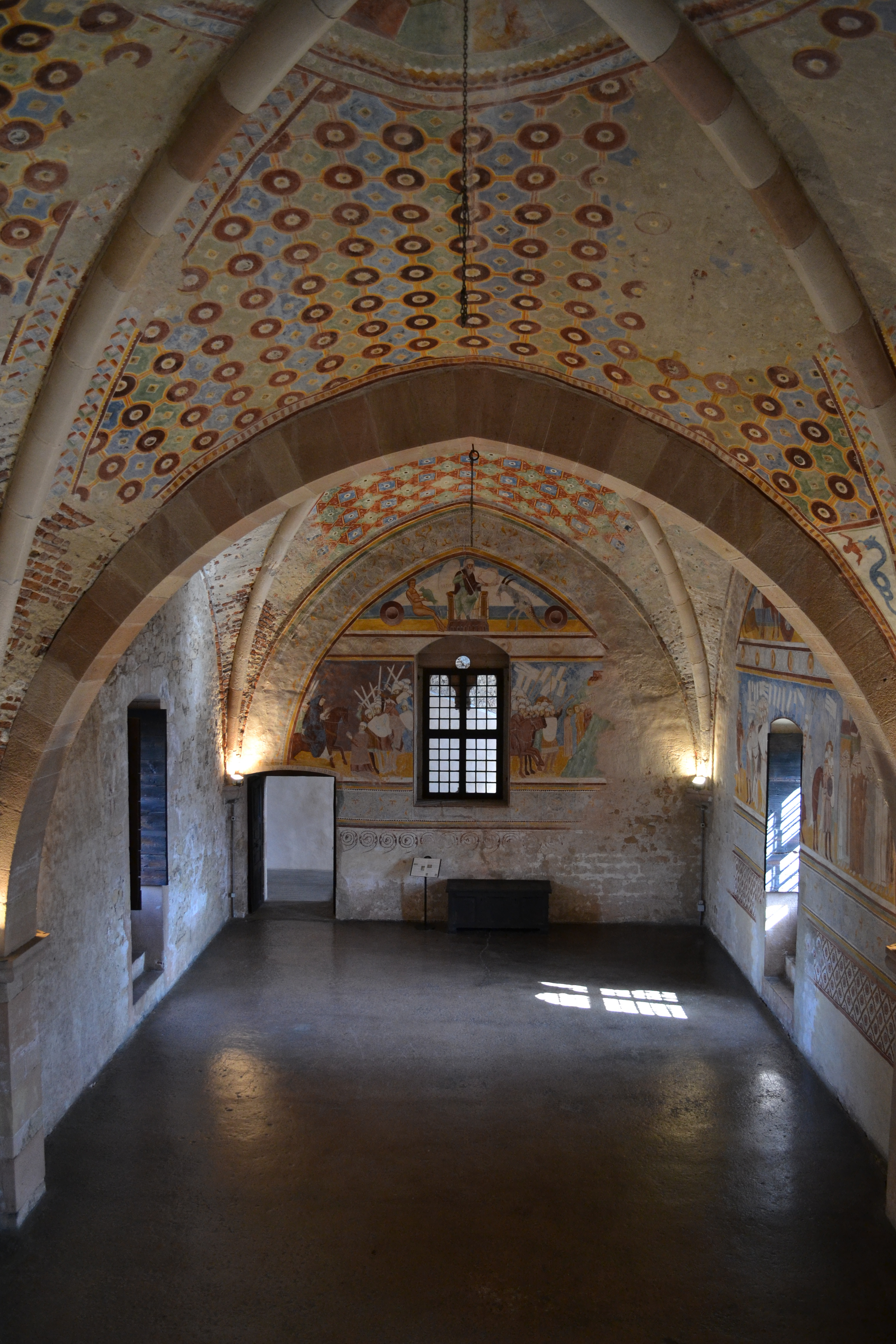
Overall view

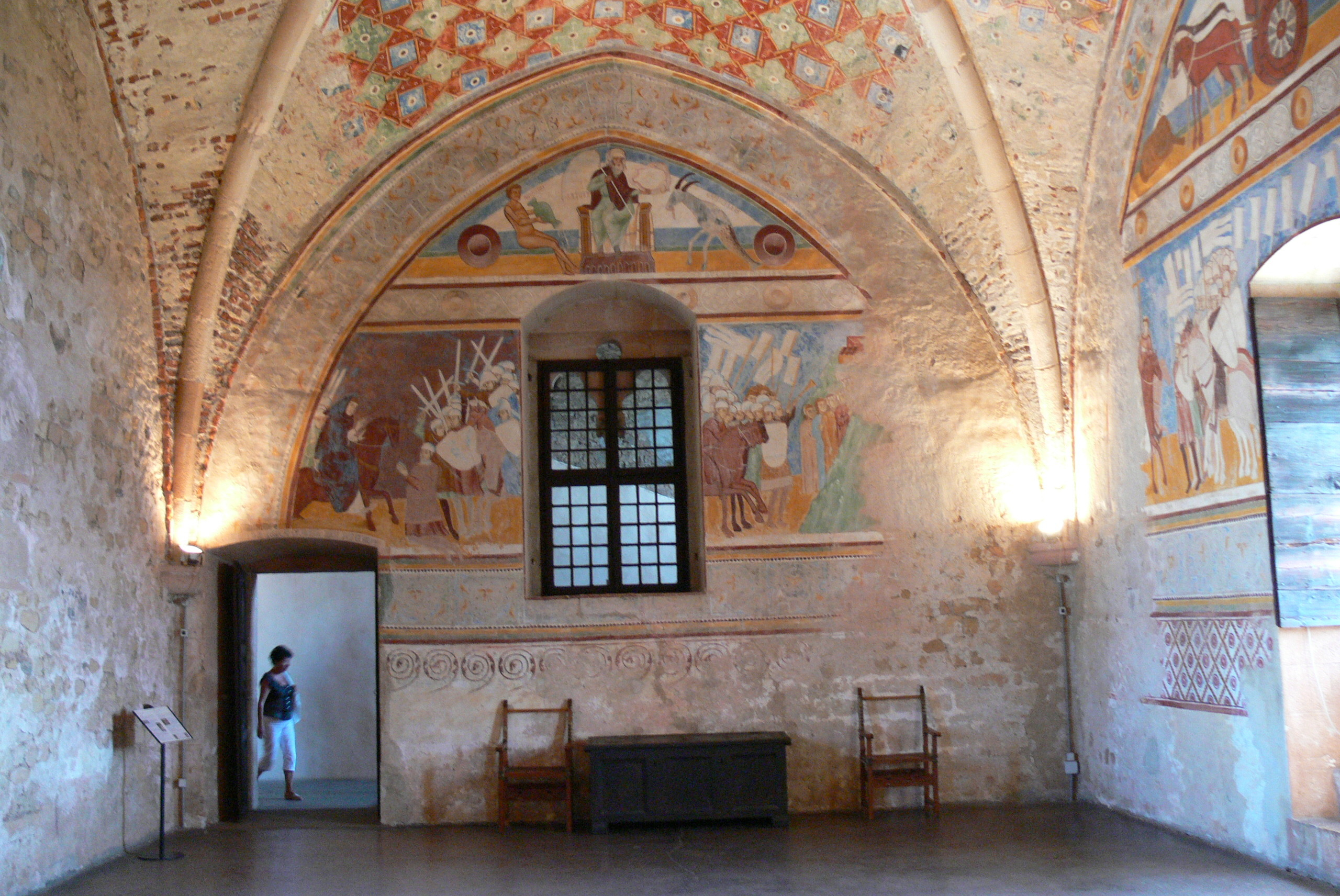
Bay 1

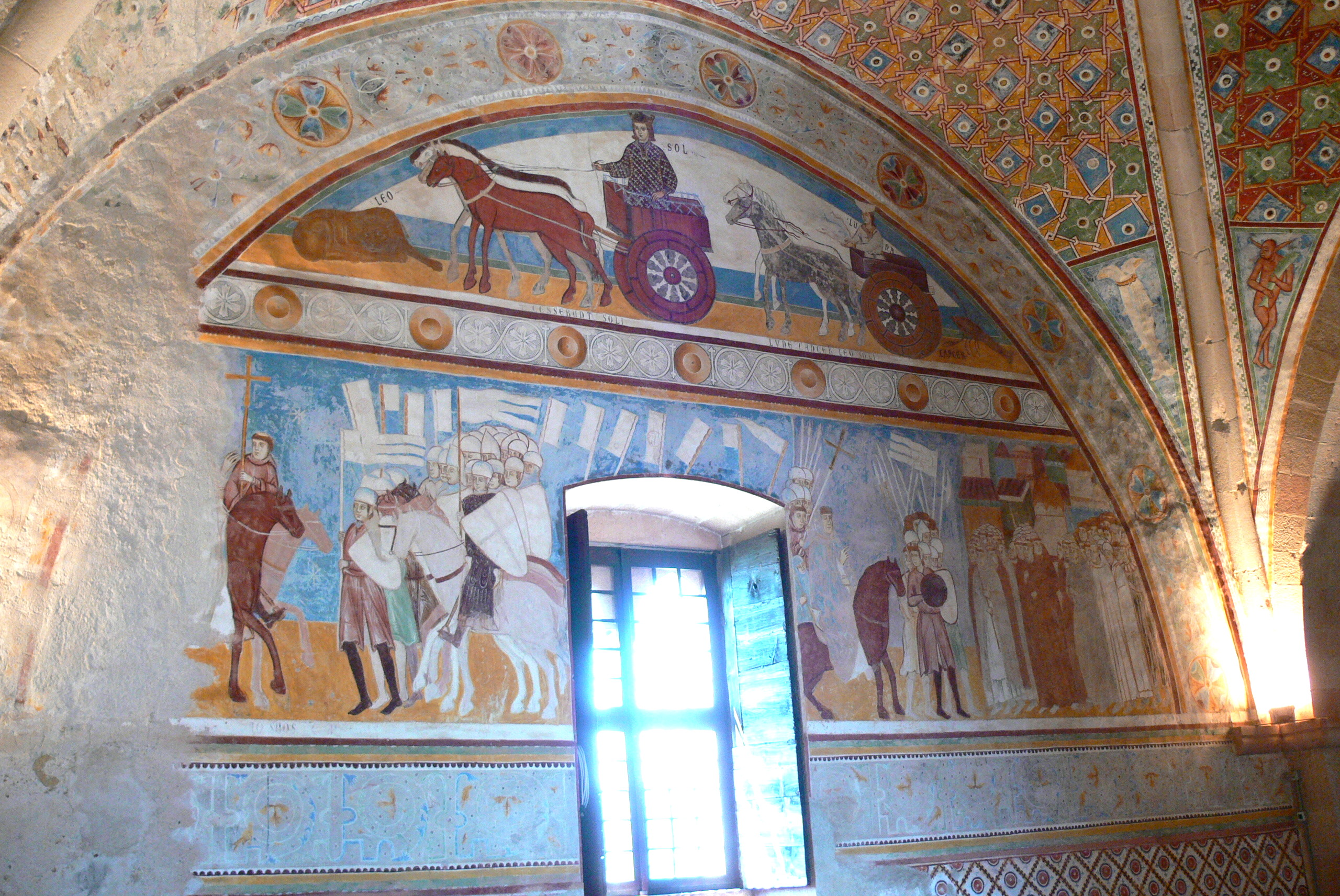
Bay 2

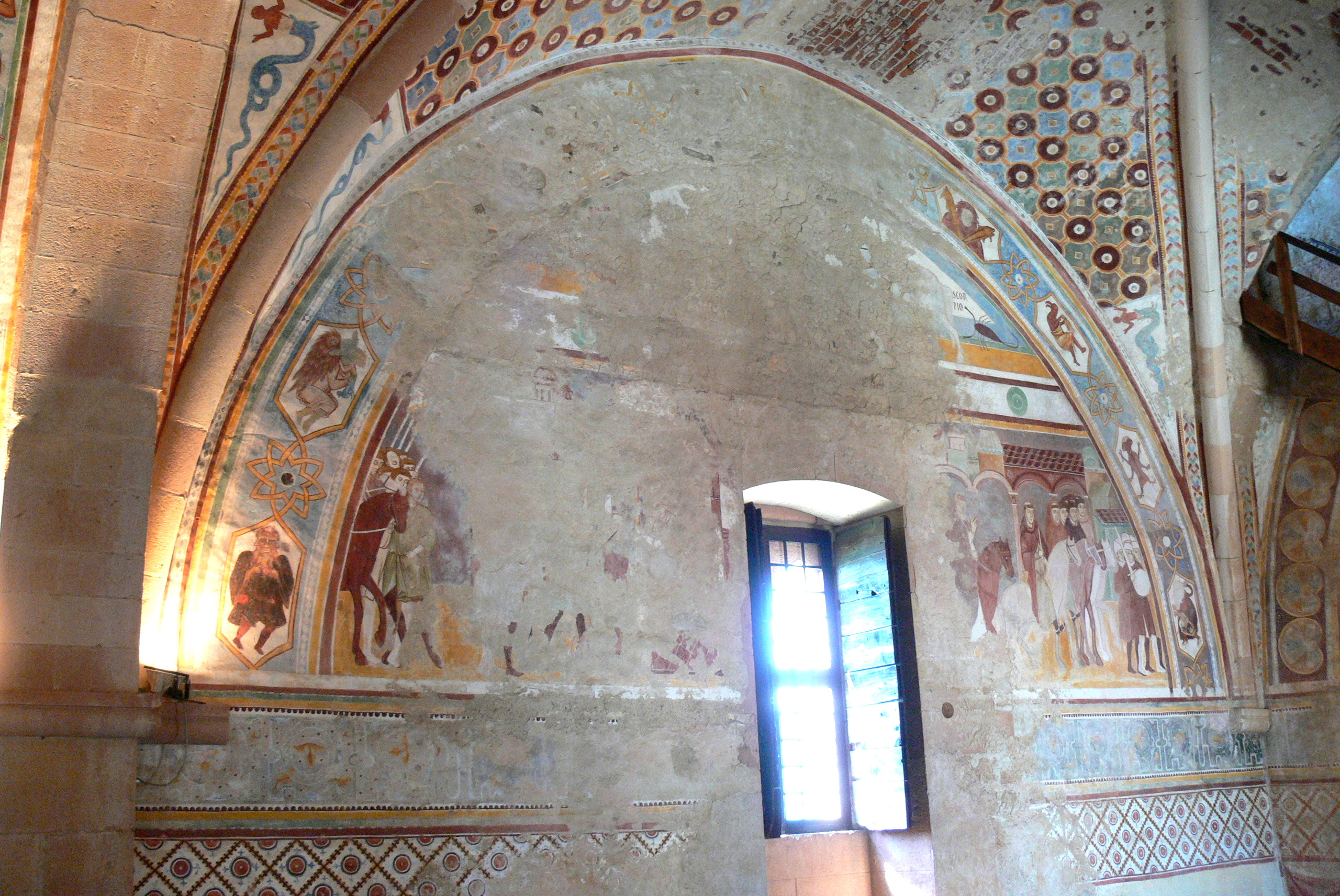
Bay 3

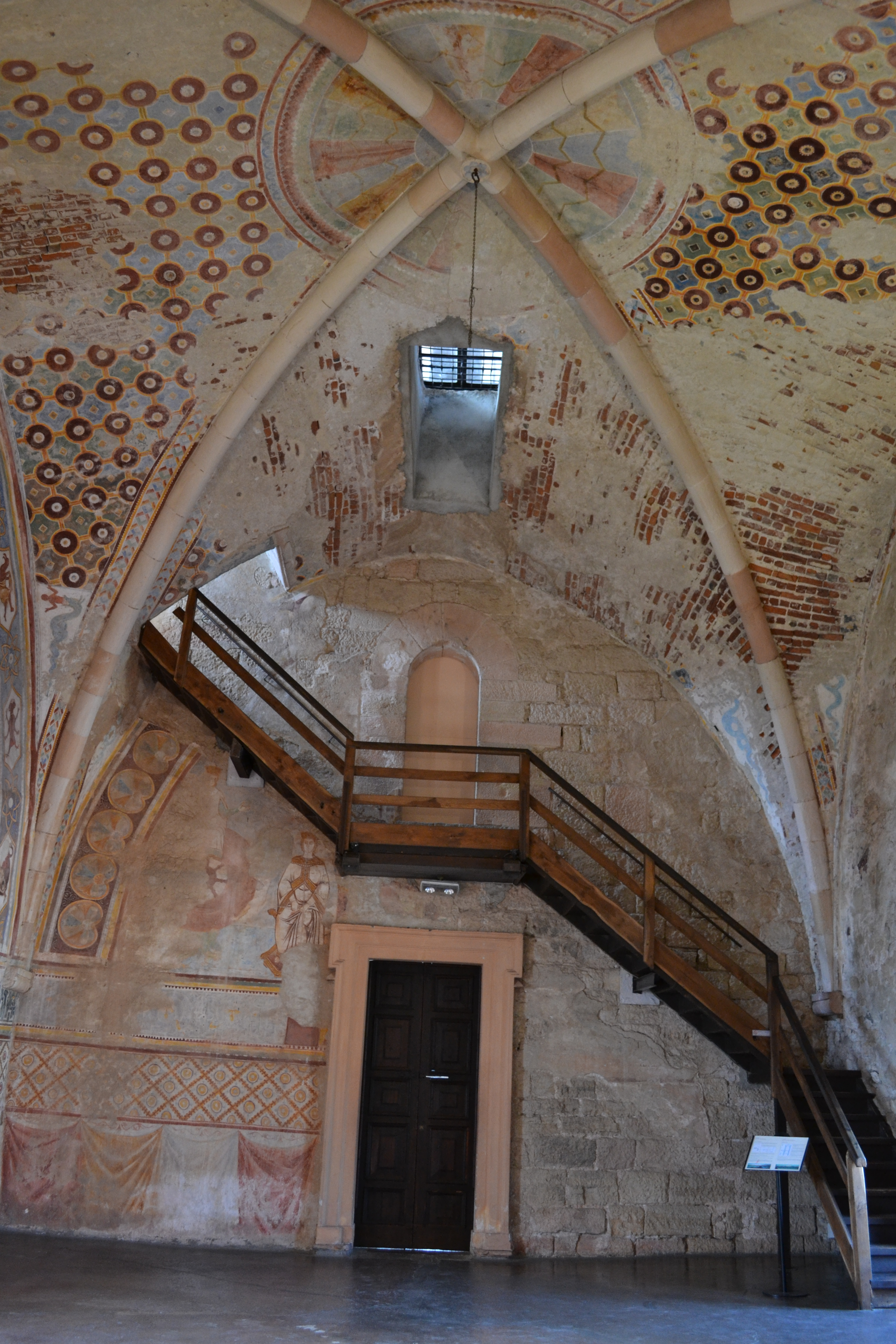
Bay 4

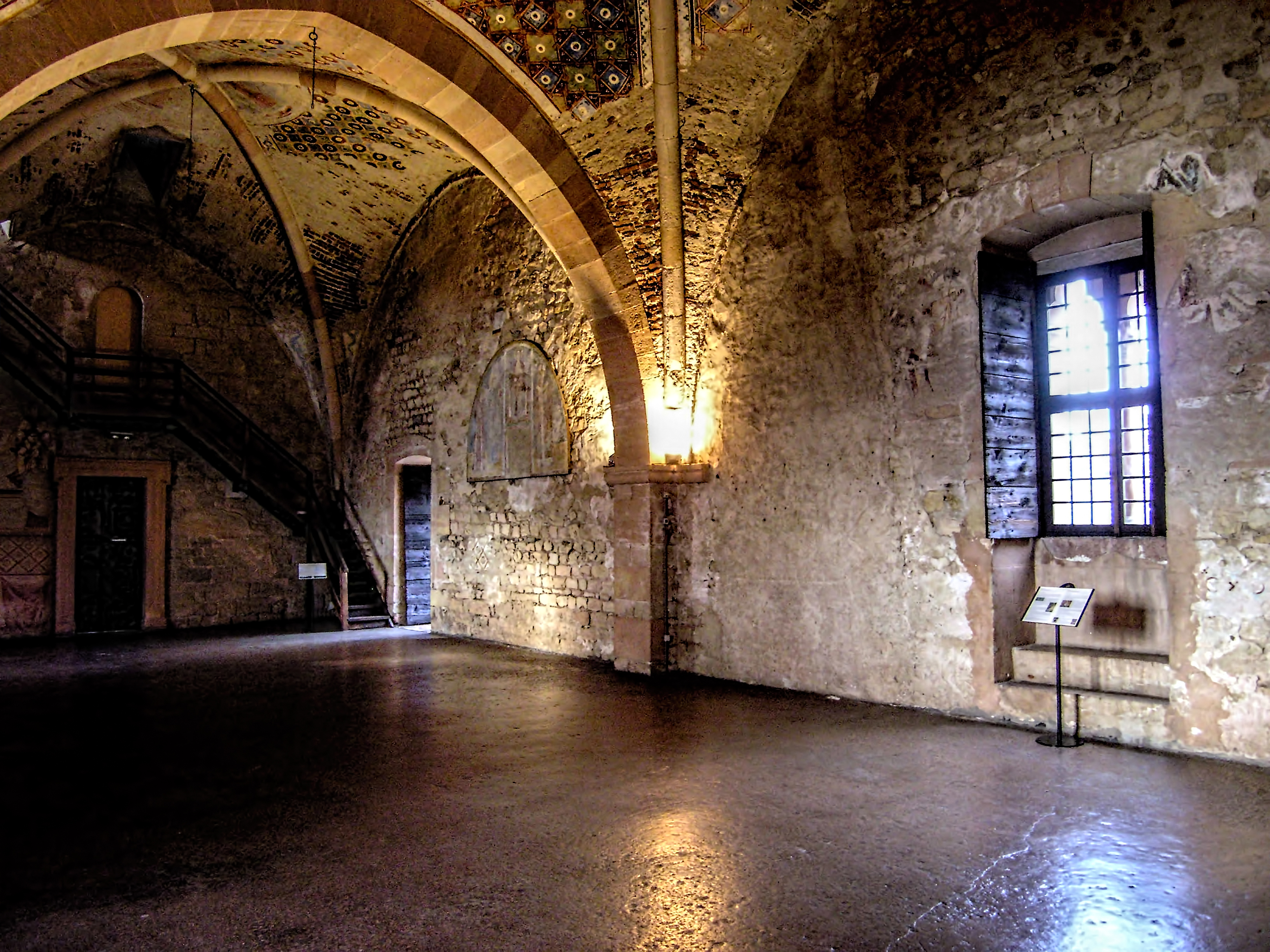
Bay 5 and 6 have lost their frescoes

== Sources ==
- Conti, Flavio; Hybsch, Vincenzo; Vincenti, Antonello (1991). I castelli della Lombardia. Provincie di Como, Sondrio e Varese (in Italian). Novara: Istituto Geografico de Agostini. ISBN 9788840293783. OCLC 40474510.
- Del Tredici, Federico; Rossetti, Edoardo (2012). Castle trails from Milan to Bellinzona - Guide to the dukedom's castles. Milan: Nexi-Castelli del ducato. ISBN 9788896451069. OCLC 955635027. Archived from the original on July 13, 2024.
- Fohrer, Eberhard; Schmid, Marcus X. (2023). Lago Maggiore (in German) (6 ed.). Erlangen, Bavaria: Michael Müller Verlag. ISBN 9783966851565. OCLC 1371316236.
- Welch, Evelyn S. (1995). Art and Authority in Renaissance Milan. New Haven and London: Yale University Press. ISBN 9780300063516. OCLC 32429850.
