= Teresa Ciceri Castiglioni =

Italian inventor, agronomist (1750–1821)

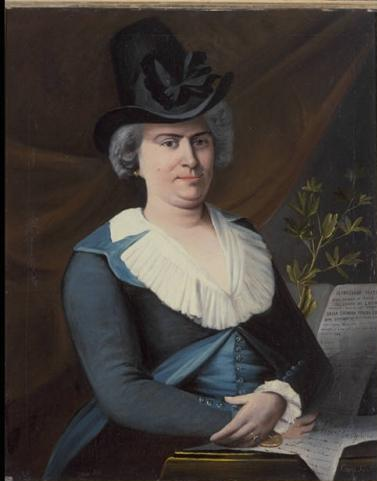
- Ciceri by Seveso Ciceri
- Born: Teresa Castiglioni; 15 October 1750; Angera, Italy
- Died: 29 March 1821 (aged 70); Como, Italy
- Occupation: Inventor
- Known for: Introducing potato cultivation
- Spouse: Cesare Ciceri
- Children: 12

Teresa Ciceri Castiglioni (Angera, 15 October 1750 – Como, 29 March 1821) was an Italian inventor and agronomist who was instrumental in the introduction of potato cultivation to her region of Italy.

== Biography ==
Teresa Castiglioni, daughter of Count Giobatta Castiglioni Zaneboni, was married in 1770, at the age of 20 to a 43-year-old noble from Como. Her husband, Cesare Liberato Ciceri, belonged to a prestigious family and the couple went on to have 12 children. They lived in the centre of Como in an austere complex of 59 rooms (in what is now Via Diaz). In their early years together in Camnago Volta, a quartiere in Como, the family owned a considerable amount of land as well as the properties of Rienza and Figarola. They had servants, wet nurses, grooms and musicians. What was missing was cash, so Teresa's husband often resorted to loans and the sale of portions of his land to allow his sons to study and for the marriage of his daughters.

=== Studies and discoveries ===
Using her married name, Teresa Ciceri specialized in agricultural sciences, to which she made several contributions. She was also interested in arts and useful applications in industry. According to Mita Ferraro, "She was first in Lombardy to introduce among her peasants the cultivation of potatoes, and she managed to obtain thread from the stem of lupines."

For example, Ciceri developed a system for obtaining thread for weaving and making cloth from lupines (commonly called bluebonnets), which is a plant commonly found in acidic soils. She promoted the art of "combing, spinning, twisting and knitting the bark of lupins" as Maurizio Monti wrote in his Story of Como. Some fragments, which she produced by herself, are still preserved in the Civic Museum of Como, as is her portrait painted by Sevesco Ciceri.

On 1 February 1786, the Patriotic Society of Milan appointed Ciceri "Sozia National Correspondent for knowledge and zeal respectively for the objects of agriculture and Arts" for her lupine discovery, but above all for having introduced the cultivation of potatoes in the Como area.

Chemist Alessandro Volta was instrumental in making her a member of the Patriotic Society of Milan. In a letter to Cavalier Landriani, Volta wrote: "...Abbot Carlo Amoretti will bring to the Patriotic Society the canvas and other exhibits of lupine lint, which he presents to the same Society with a description of its operations, Signora Donna Teresa Ciceri, 'dama comasca,' my singular mistress and friend..." (from Flavia Scotti née Castiglioni).

Ciceri's cultivation of potatoes was also acclaimed by Don Mario Monti, parish priest of Brunate, who in 1832 wrote that there were 10 varieties of potatoes being grown around the village at that time and that the duty to do these agricultural experiments was the property of wealthy landowners.

Ciceri's friend Alessandro Volta was a guest at her home in Angera on 4 November 1776, when he collected some gas that was being released from a nearby swamp. He initially called it "the flammable native air of the marshes;" it was later classified as methane gas. Volta is credited with the discovery of methane.

== Legacy ==
The Teresa Ciceri High School in Como, Italy, is named after her.
