= Castigliano =

Castigliano is a surname. Notable persons with that name include:

- Carlo Alberto Castigliano (1847–1884), Italian mathematician and physicist
- Caroline Castigliano (born c.1960), British fashion designer
- Eusebio Castigliano (1921–1949), Italian football player

== See also ==
- Castigliano's method
- Castiglione (surname)
