= Caroline Castigliano =

British fashion designer

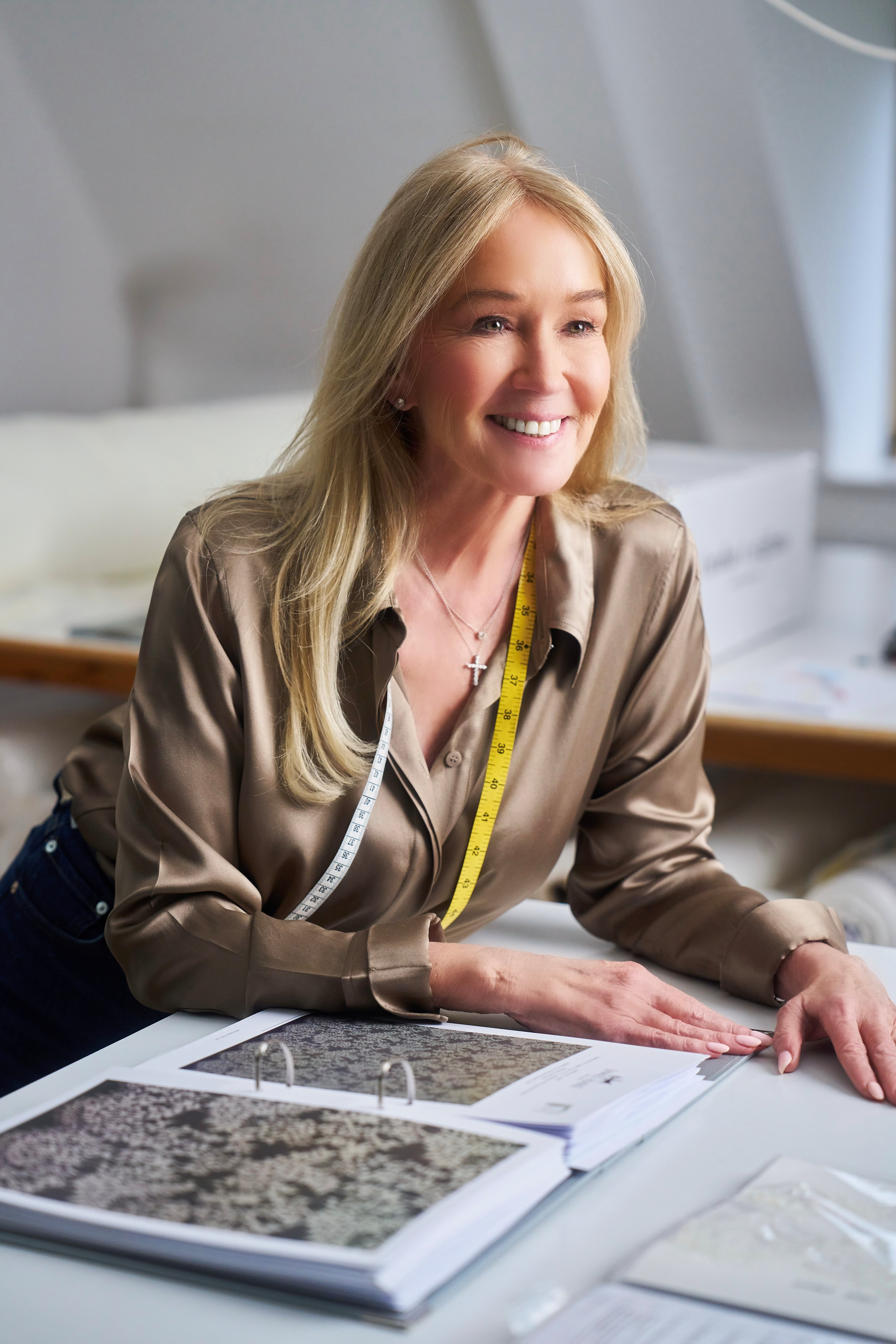
- Caroline Castigliano in her atelier
- Known for: Bespoke fashion design
- Website: carolinecastigliano.com

Caroline Castigliano is a British fashion designer, noted for her elegant bespoke wedding and evening wear dress ranges, the Caroline Castigliano Collection. In her early twenties she set up a business in Florida, 'Survival Kit', designing sportswear for women, which was sold in Macy's, Bloomingdales and Saks.

In 1990, she returned to the UK and opened a bespoke bridalwear retail business and in the mid nineties worked with Jasper Conran. In 1996, she launched her first high end bridal dress collection.

As of 2016, Castigliano has their flagship couture bridal gown showroom located in Knightsbridge, London, and a dedicated production facility in Lincolnshire (UK). Castigliano's gowns are sold via specialist stockists throughout the world, including the UK, Asia, USA and Australia.

She has featured in interviews with Brides, Wedding Magazine and Wedding TV and featured on "How the Rich Get Hitched" which ran on Channel 4 in 2015
