= Castiglione (surname) =

Castiglione (Italian: [kastiʎˈʎoːne]) is an Italian habitational name from any of numerous places named with this word, from medieval Latin castellio (genitive castellionis) ‘fortification’, ‘small castle’. People with the surname include:

== People with the surname ==
- Godffredo da Castiglione, Pope Celestine IV died Rome, 10 November 1241
- Baldassare Castiglione (1478–1529), Italian Renaissance writer and diplomat, best known for The Courtier book
- Giovanni Castiglione (1420–1460), Italian bishop and cardinal
- Giovanni Battista Castiglione (1516–1598), Italian tutor to Princess (later Queen) Elizabeth I
- Giovanni Benedetto Castiglione (1609–1664), Italian (Genoese) painter and printmaker
- Giovanni Francesco Mauro Melchiore Salvemini di Castiglione (1704–1791), Italian mathematician
- Giuseppe Castiglione (Jesuit) (1688–1766), Italian painter and Jesuit missionary
- Charles-Pierre Augereau, duc de Castiglione (1757–1816), Marshal of France and French general
- Jose Pablo Martinez del Rio-Castiglione (fl. 1859), Italo-Mexican nobleman in the court of Maximilian I of Mexico
- Virginia Oldoini, Countess di Castiglione (1837–1899), Italian courtesan and mistress of Napoleon III
- Giuseppe Castiglione (1829–1908), Italian painter
- Pete Castiglione (1921–2010), American baseball player
- Joe Castiglione (born 1947), Boston Red Sox radio announcer
- Joe Castiglione (athletic director) (born 1957), at the University of Oklahoma
- Giuseppe Castiglione (politician) (born 1963), Italian politician
- Mario Castiglione (born 1995), know professionally as Mameli, Italian singer-songwriter
- Nancy Castiglione (born 1981), Canadian actress active in the Philippines
- Salvatore Castiglione (1620–1676), Italian painter of the Baroque period
- Sergio Castiglione (born 1965), Argentine photographer
- Sofía Gala Castiglione (born 1987), Argentine actress
- Yael Castiglione (born 1985), Argentine volleyball player

== Fictional characters ==
- Francis "Frank" Castle (born Castiglione), Sicilian-American vigilante the Punisher from Marvel Comics

== See also ==
- Castiglioni
- Castigliano
