= Palazzo Castiglioni (Cingoli) =

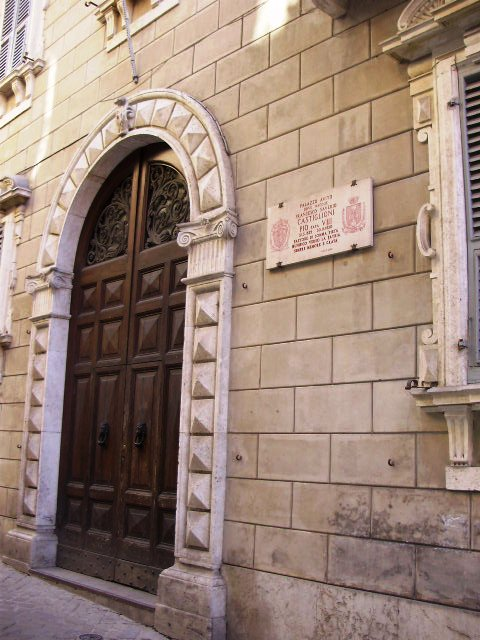
Castiglioni Palace. Plaque to Pius VIII

Palazzo Castiglioni is a historical mansion in the heart of the mountain top town of Cingoli, near Macerata, in the Marche, central Italy.

== History ==
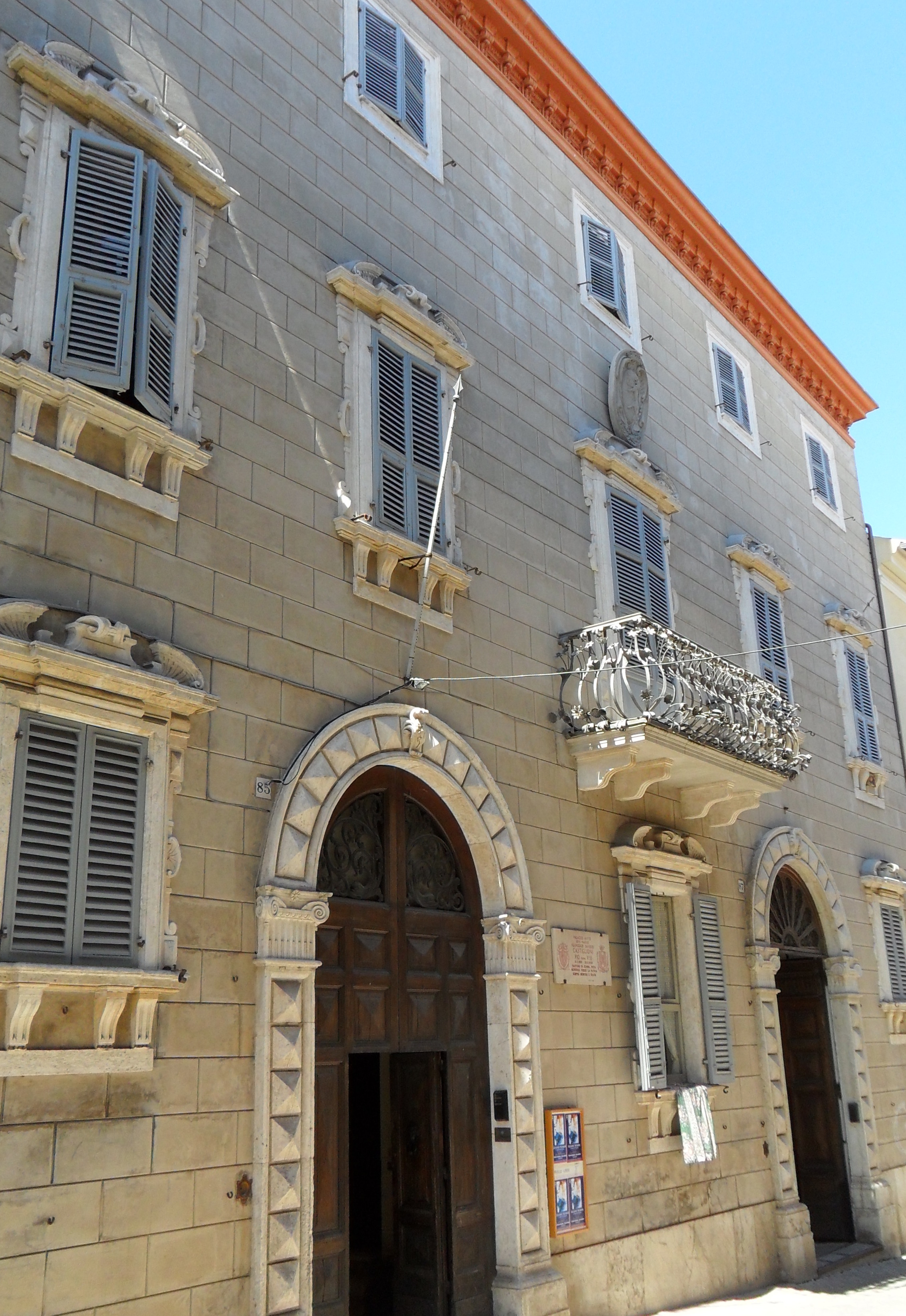

Palazzo Castiglioni was purchased in 1599 by Bernardo Castiglioni who had been exiled from Milan. He was the first of the Marche branch of the family, who in the following centuries increased in power and prestige, becoming active participants in the towns life.

The most important members of the family are pope Urban II of the Burgundy branch (1093), pope Celestine IV (1241), Baldassarre Castiglioni (1478–1529) and finally Francesco Saverio Castiglioni who reigned as Pope for a short period and whom the current Marquis is named after. As Pope he took the name Pius VIII in memory of Pius V, an ancestor of his mother. It is the residence of a descendant of the family, the Francesco Saverio Castiglioni, who claims the title of Marquis.
