= Nicolaus of Luxemburg =

Czech bishop (1322–1358)

Nicolaus of Luxemburg (1322 – 30 July 1358) was Patriarch of Aquileia from 1350 until 1358.

== Biography ==
He was born in Prague, the illegitimate son of King John of Bohemia (John the Blind). On 2 August 1342 Pope Clement VI proclaimed him provost of the Diocese of Prague, following John's wish. In the same year, Nicolaus was named canon of Vyšehrad. In a document from 1348 Nicolaus calls himself dean of the church of Olomouc and royal chancellor.

Clement VI appointed Nicolaus bishop of Naumburg on 7 January 1349, as one of the opponents to Johann of Miltitz. Nicolaus could not stand his ground; possibly he was only nominated but never took the office.

On 31 October 1350 Nicolaus became the new patriarch of Aquileia. In May 1351, Nicolaus arrived at Udine. During his term of office, he planned to found a commercial centre called "Carola" together with his half-brother, the future emperor Charles IV. This project was not to be realised. The very year of his establishment, he had to face an attack by Henry III, Count of Gorizia, who destroyed Cassacco, and by Albert II of Austria, who occupied Carnia, Venzone, Udine, Gemona and besieged Cividale. However, the patriarchate was able to escape by giving Venzone and some other castles to the Austrians.

At the end of 1351 and beginning of 1352, some noblemen were executed by order of the new patriarch. The men were said to have participated in the murder of the patriarch's predecessor, Bertram of St. Genesius, two years before. Like the former, Nicolaus took part in an alliance against the Republic of Venice with the counts of Gorizia, Francesco I da Carrara, lord of Padua, his half brother Charles IV, Louis I of Hungary and the dukes of Austria. The league's troops occupied Grado and Muggia (1356), while Louis stripped Venice of most of Dalmatia. The siege of Treviso (July–September 1356) was a failure, but Venice suffered a severe defeat at Nervesa (13 January 1358), being forced to cede Dalmatia and Croatia to Hungary.

In 1353, Charles IV consented to the erection of a studium generale at Cividale. In October 1354, he visited the Patriarchate of Aquileia on his way to Rome. During his stay, Nicolaus presented him a much sought-after relic, two pages of the Gospel of Mark. Nicolaus accompanied his half-brother on his way through Italy.

Nicolaus died at Belluno in 1358. The cause is unknown, although it is assumed to be by sickness. Nicolaus is buried in Udine underneath the main altar of the church.

Catholic Church titles
Preceded by Bertram of St. Genesius	Patriarch of Aquileia; 1350-1358	Succeeded by Lodovico della Torre
