= Mummies of Venzone =

Naturally preserved human bodies found in Venzone, Italy

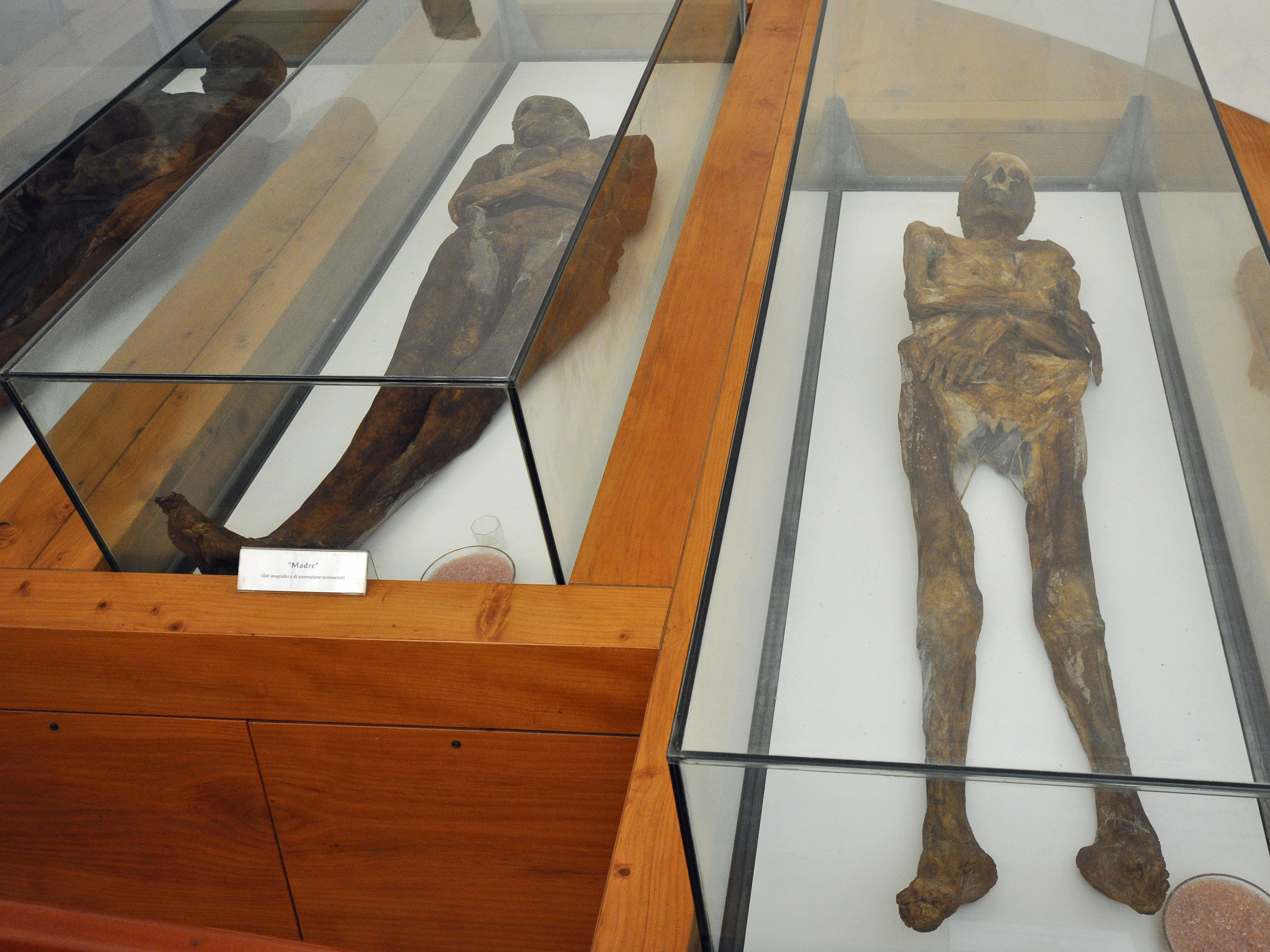
- The mummies of Venzone
- Type: Naturally preserved human remains
- Location: Venzone, Friuli-Venezia Giulia, Italy

Site notes
- Discovered: 1647
- Condition: 15 surviving bodies
- Public access: Yes

The mummies of Venzone are a group of naturally mummified human remains discovered in tombs beneath the Cathedral of Saint Andrew the Apostle in Venzone, Friuli-Venezia Giulia, Italy. The first, known as the Gobbo di Venzone ("Hunchback of Venzone"), was discovered in 1647 in a fourteenth-century tomb. Other mummies were subsequently found beneath the cathedral.

The unusual preservation of the bodies has been the subject of scientific study since at least the early twentieth century. Their mummification was historically attributed to a fungus found in the tombs, although later research has also examined the role of the burial environment and the limestone beneath the cathedral. Of the 21 mummies housed in the Chapel of San Michele before the 1976 Friuli earthquake, 15 were recovered from the ruins. Five are now on permanent public display.

== Discovery ==
The Cathedral of Saint Andrew the Apostle in Venzone was consecrated in 1338. Prominent members of the community were buried inside the cathedral, while other burials took place in the cemetery surrounding it. Over time, 21 tombs were built beneath the cathedral floor. These were small chambers lined with brick and covered by stone slabs.

The first documented mummy came to light in 1647, when work on the cathedral floor uncovered a preserved body. The man became known as the Gobbo di Venzone ("Hunchback of Venzone"). Later examination dated his death to about 1340–1350, shortly after the cathedral was built. He had been buried in fine velvet, and the stone covering his tomb bore the coat of arms of the Scaliger family of Verona, suggesting that he may have had a connection to the family.

No further discoveries are documented until the early nineteenth century, when more preserved bodies began to emerge from beneath the cathedral. Unlike the much older Gobbo, these mummies came from people buried from the early eighteenth century onward. By 1831, 18 mummies had been recorded. The discoveries continued, and by 1842 the number had risen to 34. By 1906, F. Savorgnan de Brazza, who later studied the mummies, reported that 42 were known from Venzone.

== Condition and preservation ==
The Venzone mummies are notable for the degree to which their physical features have been preserved. Writing in the early twentieth century, F. Savorgnan de Brazza reported that the bodies remained readily recognizable despite the passage of time. The first mummy discovered reportedly weighed only about 15 kilograms (33 lb), while others weighed between 10 and 20 kilograms (22 and 44 lb).

== Scientific study ==
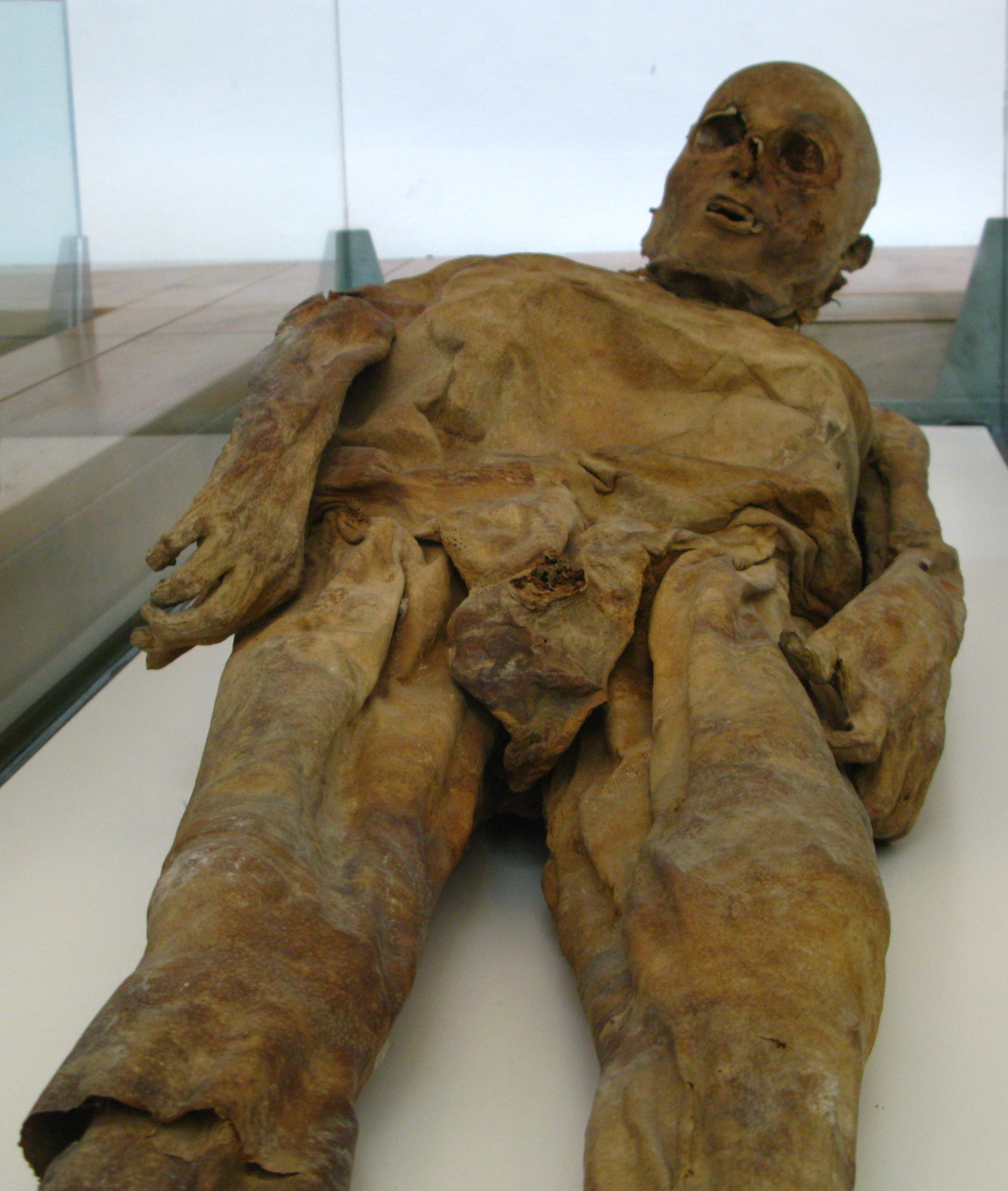
Mummy found in the Roman cemetery chapel nearby cathedral Sant'Andrea Apostolo in Venzone

The Venzone mummies have been studied since the early twentieth century in an effort to determine how the bodies became naturally mummified after burial beneath the Cathedral of Saint Andrew the Apostle. Despite more than a century of investigation, the mechanism responsible for their preservation remains unresolved.

In 1906, Italian naturalist F. Savorgnan de Brazza examined the bodies and proposed that their preservation resulted from a fungus he identified as Hypha tombicina. He reported that spores of the fungus were present in both the burial chambers and the wooden coffins in which the bodies had been interred, and considered it the most likely explanation for their natural mummification. However, scientists were unable to reproduce the process experimentally, and the environmental conditions required for the fungus to survive and reproduce remained unknown. The subsequent prohibition on burials within churches also prevented further observations of newly interred bodies under the same conditions.

In 2003, University of Minnesota professor Arthur C. Aufderheide re-examined the evidence. He noted that the bodies had originally been buried in a crypt with a native limestone floor, which may have contributed to their preservation. He also found no organisms comparable to the Hypha fungus described by de Brazza.

Scientific study has been limited by the number of surviving bodies. De Brazza documented 42 mummies in 1906, but only 15 remained after the 1976 Friuli earthquake. According to Aufderheide, local authorities have generally declined requests to collect new samples, requiring researchers to rely largely on previously collected cultures and preserved material.

== Exhibition ==
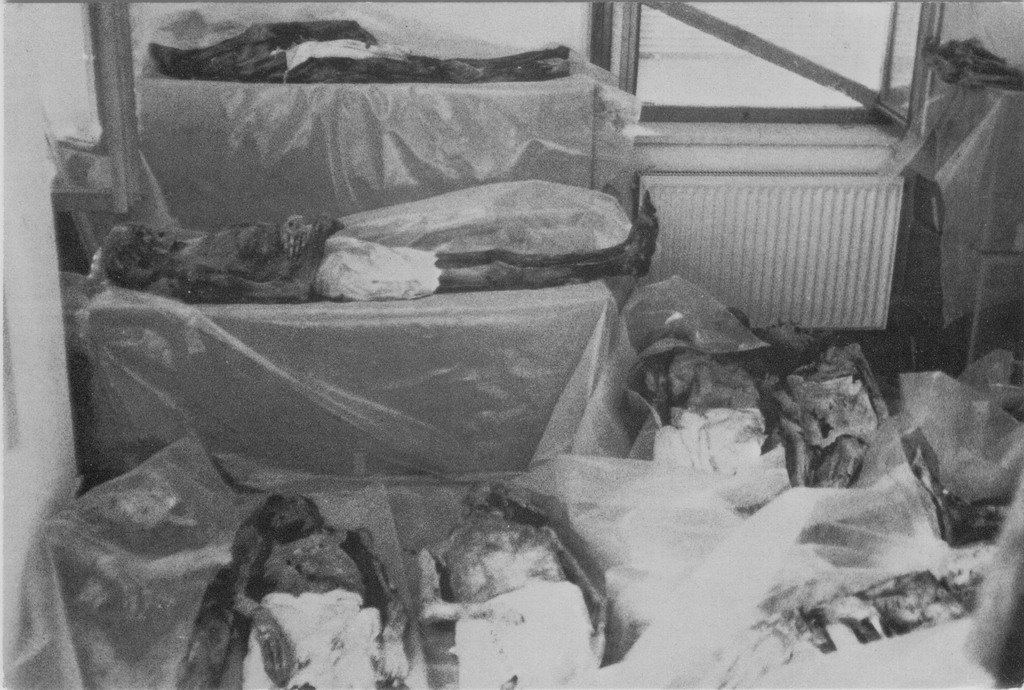
The mummies after the 1976 earthquake

The Venzone mummies have been displayed publicly since the nineteenth century. In 1845, they were moved from the crypt of the Cathedral of Saint Andrew the Apostle to an upper chamber of the nearby Cemetery Chapel of San Michele. Following the 1976 Friuli earthquake, 15 of the 21 mummies then housed in the Rotunda of San Michele were recovered from the ruins.

Today, the surviving mummies are housed in the crypt of the Cemetery Chapel of San Michele, a 13th-century chapel located beside the cathedral in Venzone. Five mummies are on public display as part of a permanent exhibition dedicated to their history and preservation.
