= Bertrand of Saint-Geniès =

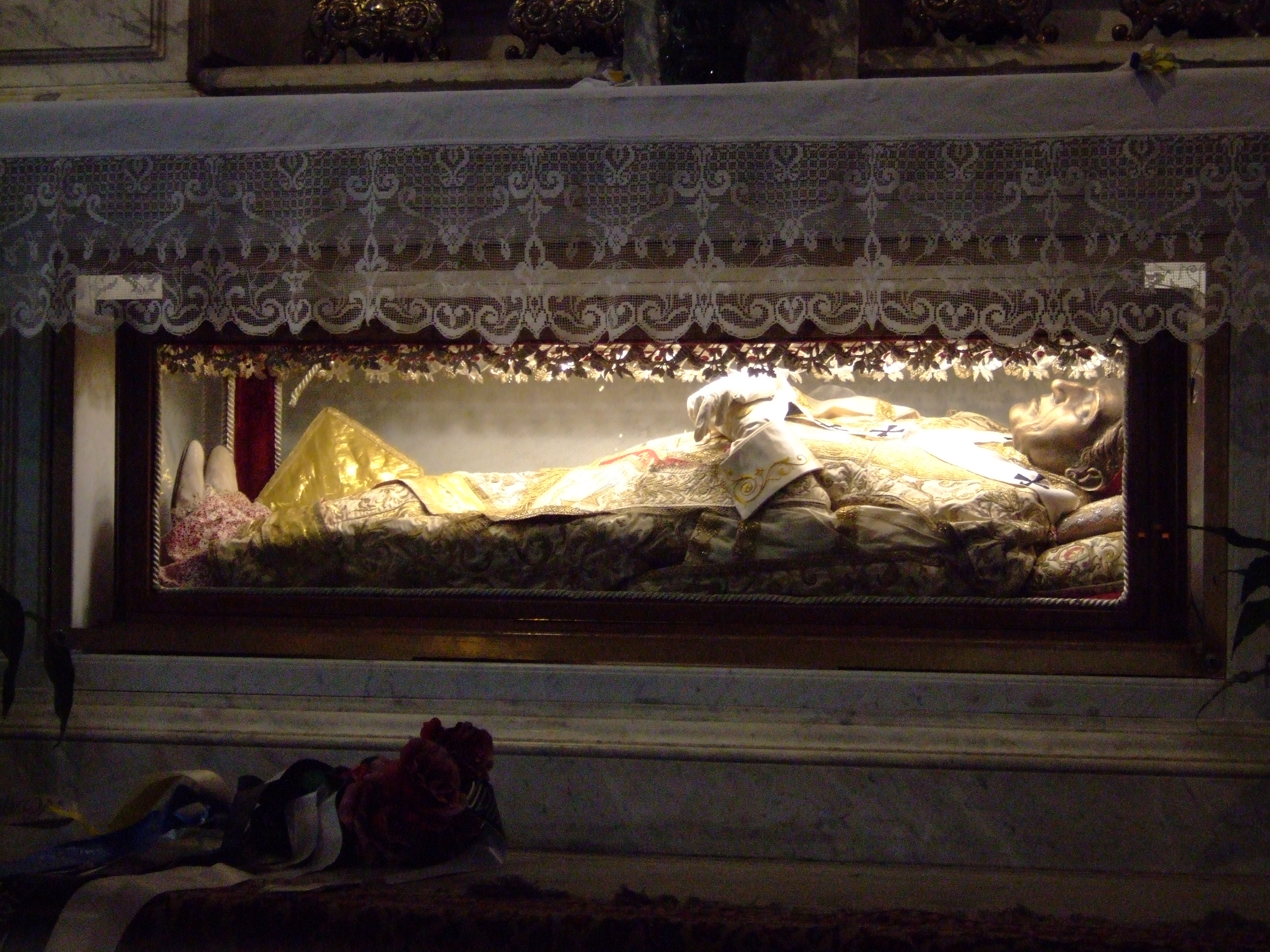
Bertram of St. Genesius, Udine Cathedral

Bertrand (or Bertram) of Saint-Geniès (1258 – 6 June 1350) was the patriarch of Aquileia from 1334 until his death.

== Biography ==
Bertram was born in Gascony, and became a jurist in the University of Toulouse and papal chaplain. On 4 June 1334 he was appointed as patriarch of Aquileia, which was not only a simple diocese but a powerful state occupying what is now Friuli.

Bertram proved a skilled diplomat and military leader. He allied with the Republic of Venice and the Duchy of Austria. In 1335 he defeated Rizzardo da Camino, who had invaded the patriarchate during the vacancy period; by this victory he was able to recover also the Cadore (1347). Later he sided with Louis I of Hungary in his expedition to Zadar (May–June 1346), which had been caught by the Venetians. Later, allied with the counts of Gorizia, Albert IV of Istria, Albert II of Austria and the Croats, he invaded Istria (1348). Koper rebelled to the Venetians, but the latter intervened and forced Bertram to a peace which brought him no gains. Subsequently, Bertram attacked the count of Gorizia, personally leading an army to reconquer Venzone (1336), Braulins and Cormons. The Gorizians reacted and invaded the patriarchal lands, but Bertram besieged Gorizia and forced the count to a definitive truce in 1341.

Once restored the foreign situation, he devoted himself to suppress the power and the autonomies gained by the Friulian feudal lords. He also strengthened the Alpine passes, building a castle (Rocca Bertranda) between Moggio Udinese and Pontebba, and had a new line of walls built in Sacile (1347). From the religious point of view, he held two councils in Udine (1335) and Aquileia (1339), followed by four synods in which he reformed the Patriarchate's religious life and established norms against the heresies which had spread in its lands.

Bertram was also a patron of the arts: he established the university of Cividale in 1344 and restored the Udine Cathedral. He also introduced new coins.

The Friulian nobles, discontented by Bertram's policies, formed an alliance against him at Spilimbergo in 1348, and conquered several villages; Udine, which had been deprived of water, was forced to accept a truce while a papal legate attempted to find a diplomatic solution. Once any possibility of a military victory waned, the rebels set a plot against the aged patriarch, who was assassinated by Enrico da Spilimbergo at San Giorgio della Richinvelda on 6 June 1350.

== Sources ==
- Brunettin, Giordano (2004). Bertrando di Saint-Geniès patriarca di Aquileia (1334-1350). Spoleto: Fondazione CISAM. ISBN 88-7988-093-4.

Preceded by Pagano della Torre	Patriarch of Aquileia; 1334–1350	Succeeded by Nicolaus of Luxemburg
