= Venzone =

Venzone Vençon (Friulian)
- Comune
- Comune di Venzone
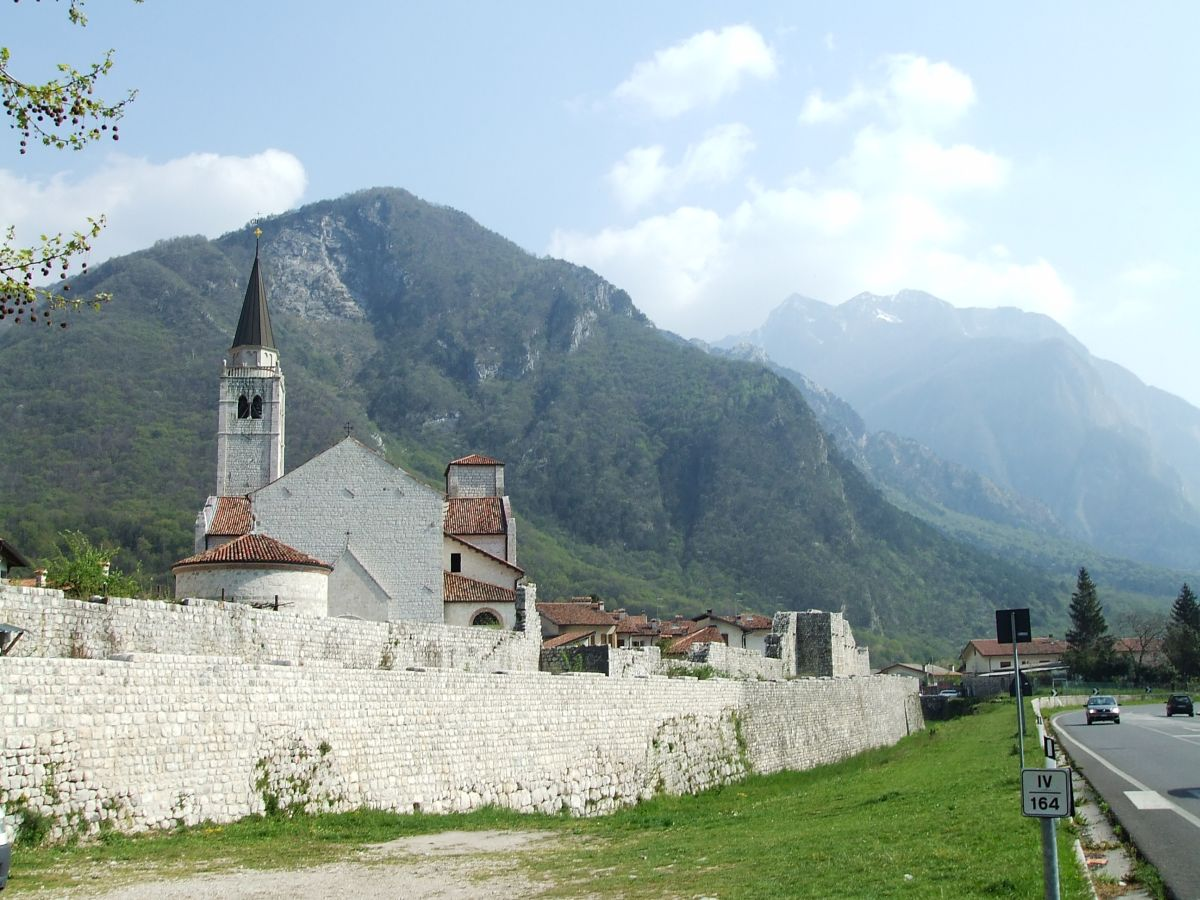
- Town wall

- Coat of arms

- Location within Italy Location within Friuli-Venezia Giulia
- Coordinates: 46°20′N 13°8′E
- Country: Italy
- Region: Friuli-Venezia Giulia
- Province: Udine (UD)
- Frazioni: Pioverno, Portis, Carnia

Government
  - Mayor: Mauro Valent

Area
  - Total: 54.6 km^{2} (21.1 sq mi)
- Elevation: 230 m (750 ft)

Population (31 January 2026)
  - Total: 1,944
  - Density: 35.6/km^{2} (92.2/sq mi)
- Demonym: Venzonesi
- Time zone: UTC+1 (CET)
  - Summer (DST): UTC+2 (CEST)
- Postal code: 33010
- Dialing code: 0432
- Website: Official website

Venzone (Italian: [venˈtsoːne]; Friulian: Vençon; Slovene: Pušja vas; German: Peuscheldorf) is a comune (municipality) in the Regional decentralization entity of Udine in the Italian region of Friuli-Venezia Giulia. It is one of I Borghi più belli d'Italia ("The most beautiful villages of Italy").

== Geography ==
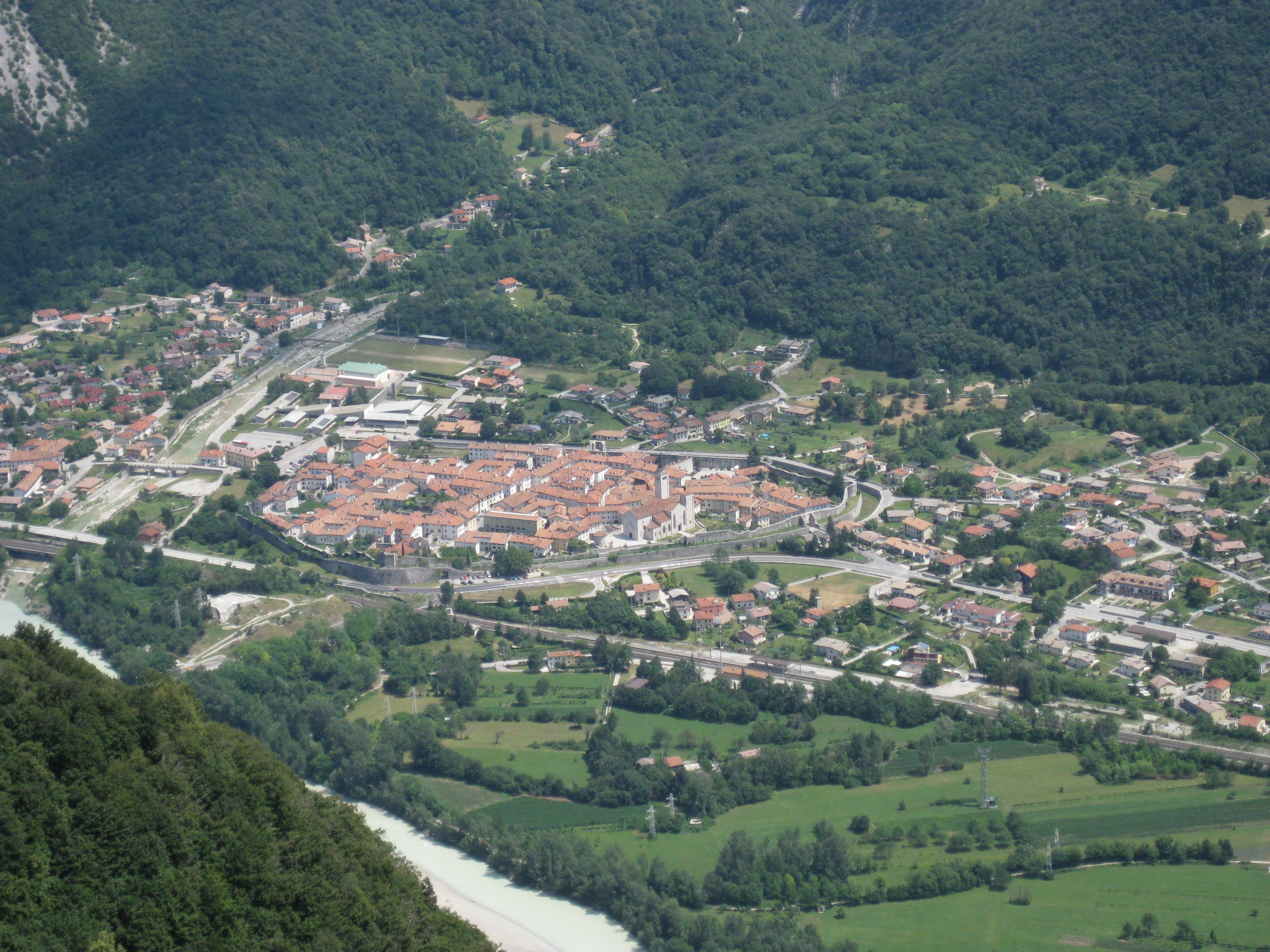
View from Carnic Prealps

It is located in the historic Friuli region, about 90 km (56 miles) northwest of Trieste and about 30 km (19 miles) north of Udine. The municipal area is situated in the valley of the Tagliamento River, separating the Julian Alps in the east from the Carnic Prealps in the west. In the northwest the river leads up to the Carnia region.

Beside Italian, Friulian is also spoken.

== History ==
A stop on the ancient trade route leading from the Adriatic coast into the Eastern Alps already existed during the Celtic period about 500 BC. In Roman times, a road (Via Iulia Augusta) led from the city of Aquileia to Zuglio and up to Plöcken Pass. After the Kingdom of the Lombards was conquered by Charlemagne in 774, a first fortified settlement was laid out under Carolingian rule.

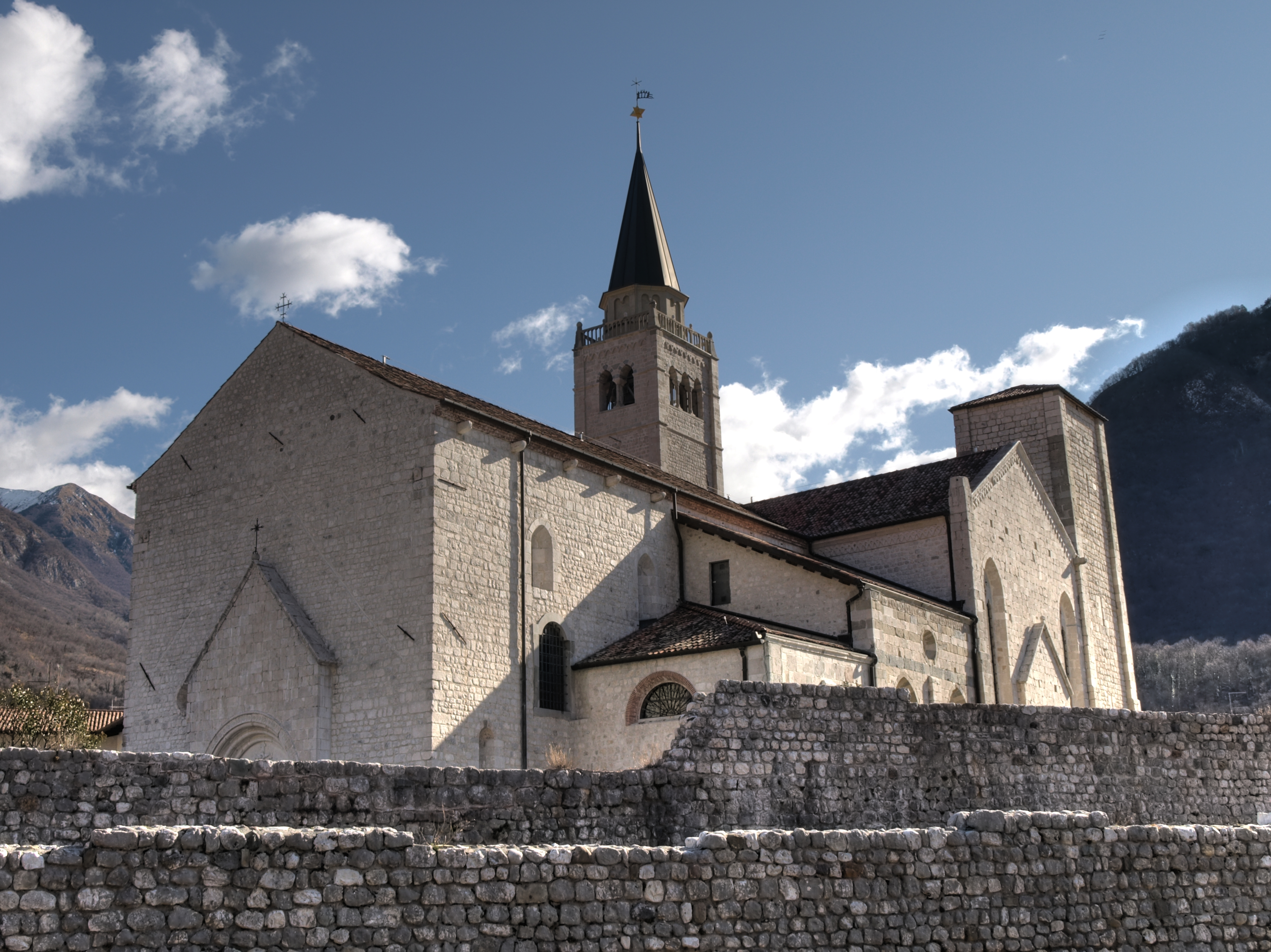
Cathedral

Venzone itself was first mentioned in a 923 deed as Clausas de Albiciones, later as Avenzone, and called Venzone in a 1001 document issued by Emperor Otto III. In 1077 it became part of the newly established Patria del Friuli and the ruling Patriarchs of Aquileia exercised control over the important trade route into the Alps.

About 1200 the patriarchs enfeoffed the Venzone estates to the Mels noble family residing at Mels Castle near Udine (progenitors of the House of Colloredo-Mansfeld). The local lords had the town surrounded by a massive double line of walls with several watchtowers and a moat, starting in 1258. After they had ceded the comune to the Counts of Gorizia, Venzone was re-acquired by Patriarch Bertram of St. Genesius in 1336. The buildings suffered severe damages during the 1348 Friuli earthquake. From 1351 the fief was held by the Habsburg duke Albert II of Austria. Duke Bolesław of Bytom of the Polish Piast dynasty suddenly died in Venzone during travel in 1354, and was buried in the cathedral. Venzone, together with most parts of Friuli, was conquered by the Republic of Venice and incorporated into the Domini di Terraferma after 1420.

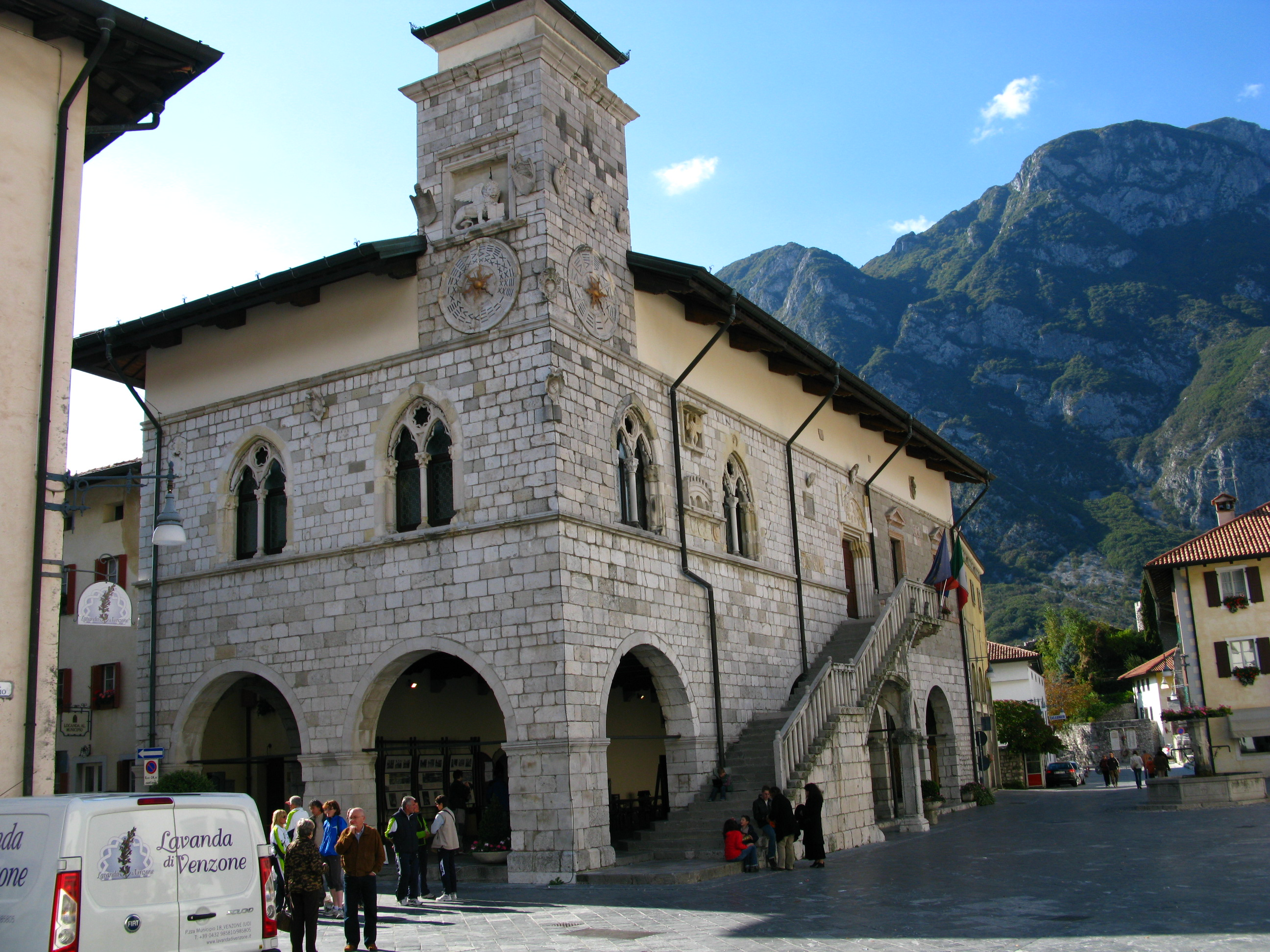
Town hall

In the following centuries of Venetian rule, Venzone lost its importance as a commercial centre. Upon the conquest by Napoleonic troops and the 1797 Treaty of Campo Formio, it passed under Austrian domination within the Kingdom of Lombardy–Venetia. After the Third Italian War of Independence in 1866, it was annexed to the newly formed Kingdom of Italy.

Venzone was almost entirely destroyed by the 1976 Friuli earthquake, killing 47 inhabitants. Clearing-up operations started immediately and, by resolution of a citizens committee guided by former mayor Fiorenzo Valent, the historic town centre was rebuilt in its original style from numerous pieces of rubble in the next years. The reconstruction was finished in 1990, with the cathedral church (Duomo).

== Main sights ==
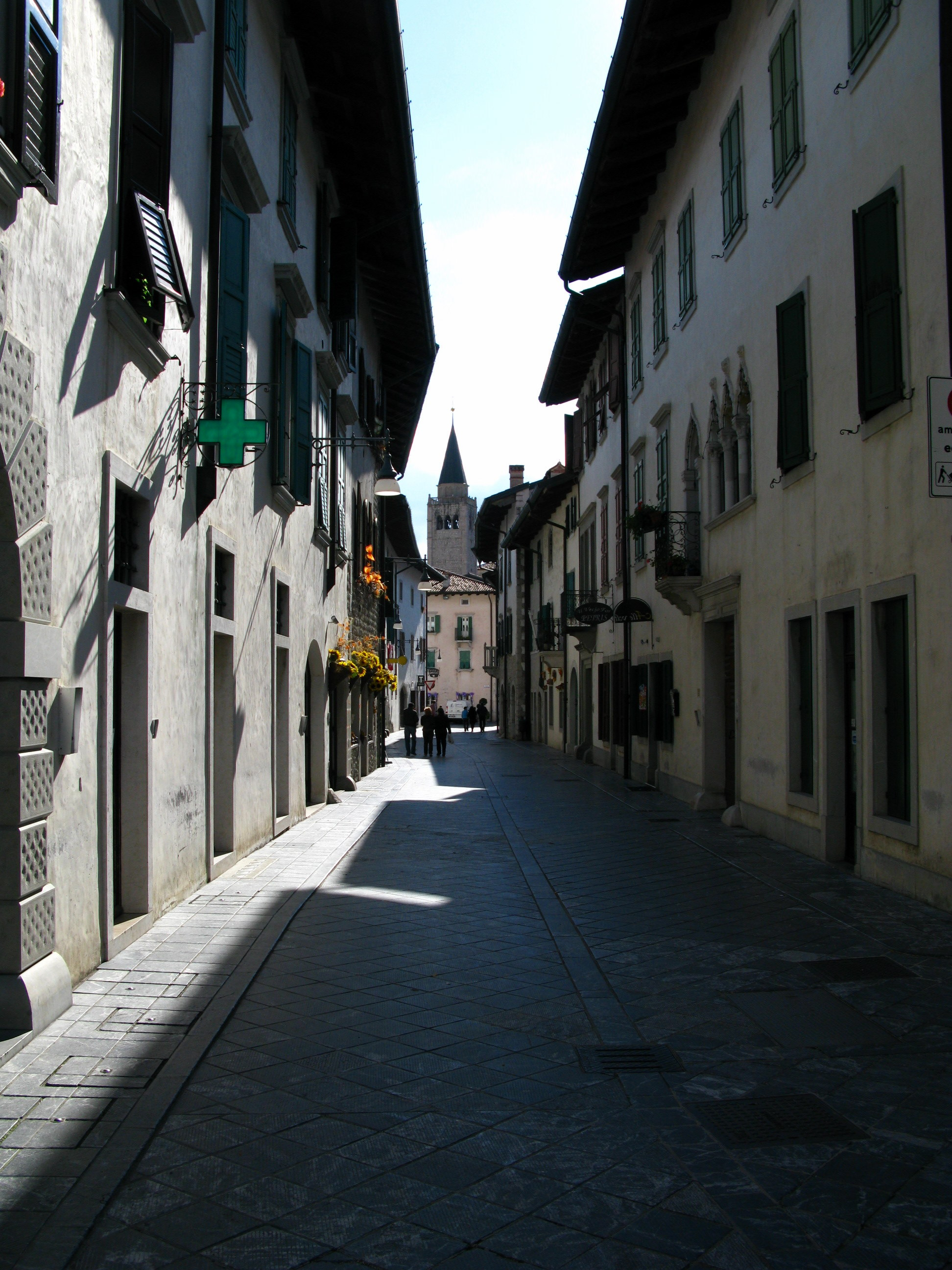
Old Town lane

- Saint Andrew Cathedral, erected by Master Giovanni from 1300 to 1338. This is a noteworthy Gothic edifice with a simple façade with a portal decorated by reliefs of the saints and Christ, a tall bell tower, and an apse area with high windows flanked by Gothic pilasters. The southern side has also several mullioned windows. The interior has remains of 14th and 15th-century frescoes and decorated capitals, and contains the sarcophagus of medieval Polish Duke Bolesław of Bytom of the Piast dynasty. Outside is a small baptistery.
- Town hall (Palazzo Comunale), built 1390–1410, with a loggia (accessible from an external stairway) and frescoes by Pomponio Amalteo.
- Medieval town walls with the Porta San Genesio (1309), the only town gate that has survived the earthquake of 1976.

== In media ==
- The first 20 minutes of the film A Farewell to Arms (1957) were filmed in Venzone.

== See also ==
- Mummies of Venzone
- 1976 Friuli earthquake

== Gallery ==
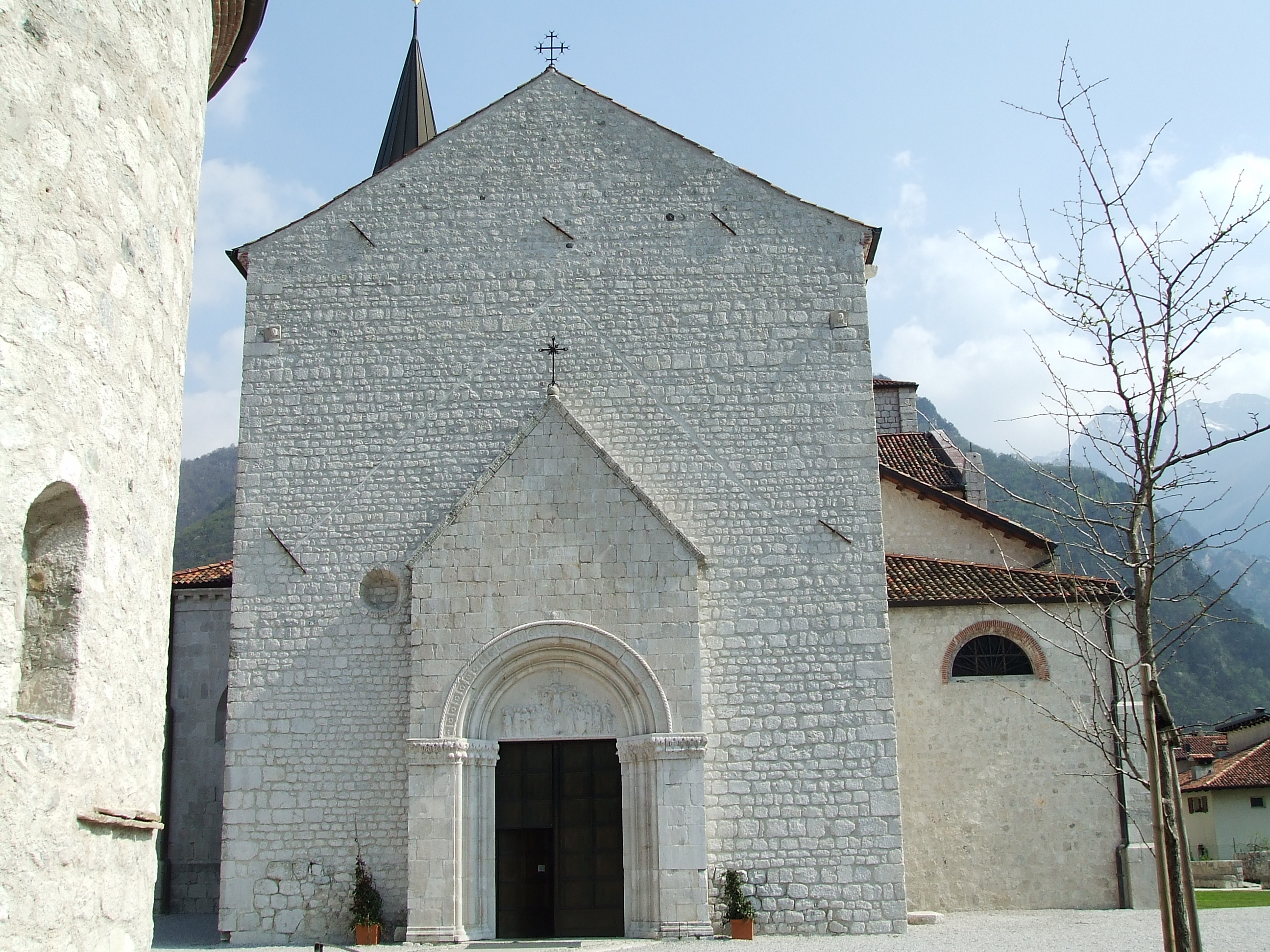
The facade of the cathedral

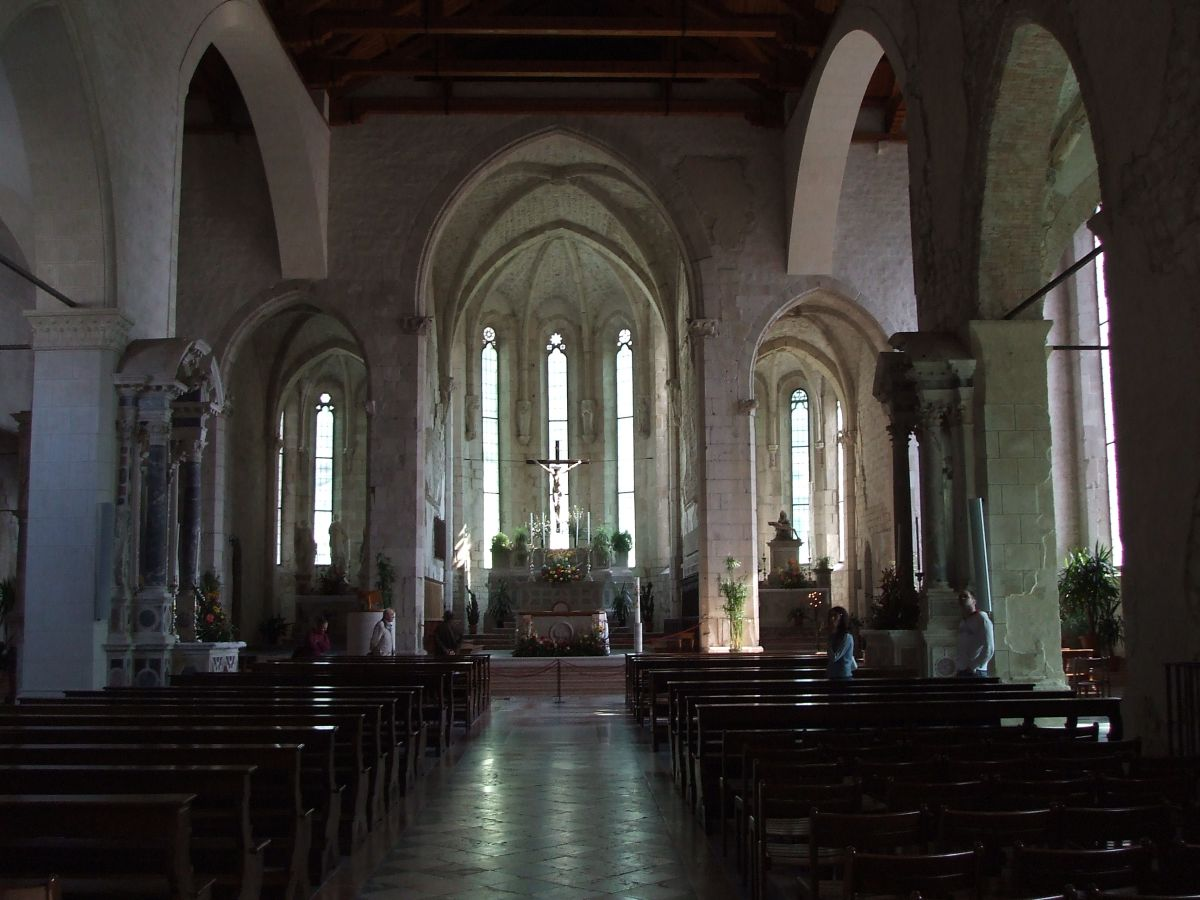
The interior of the cathedral

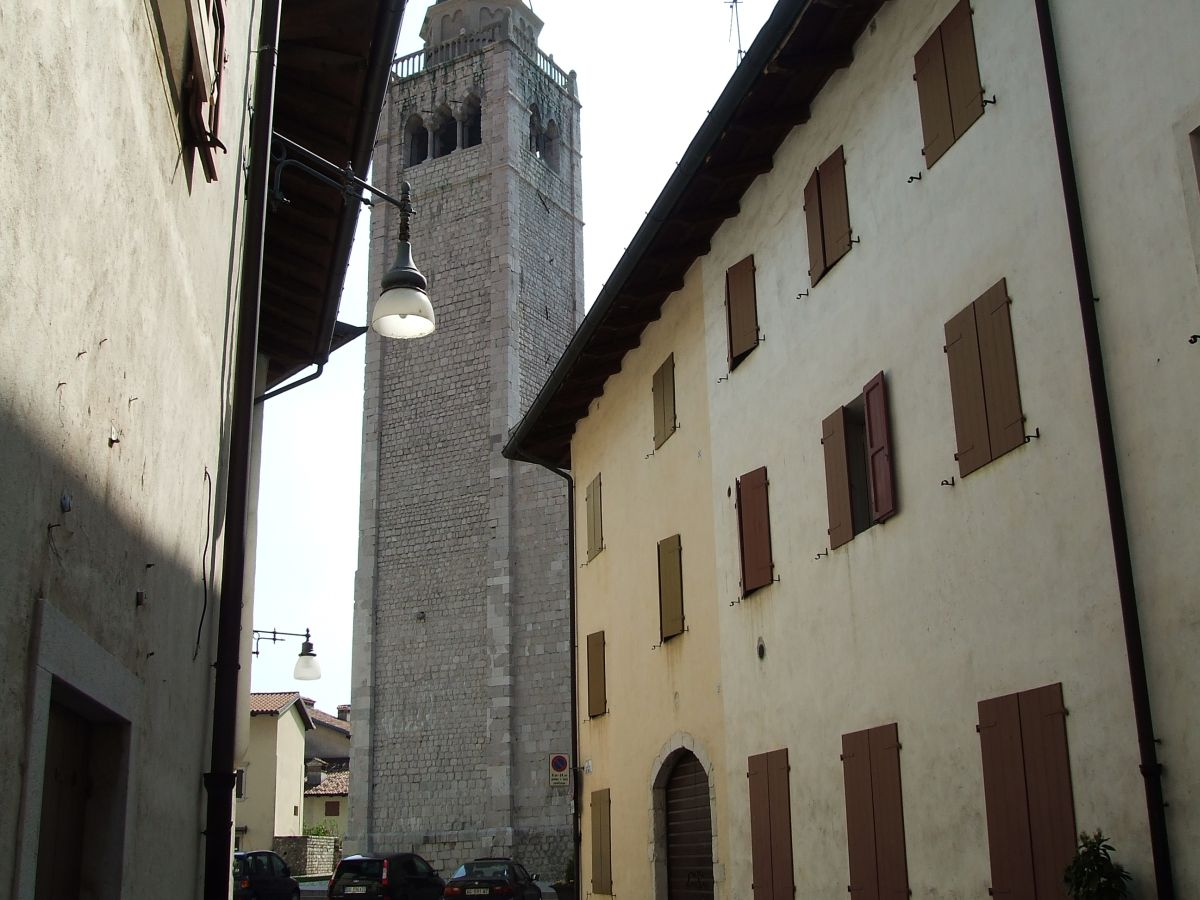
The bell tower

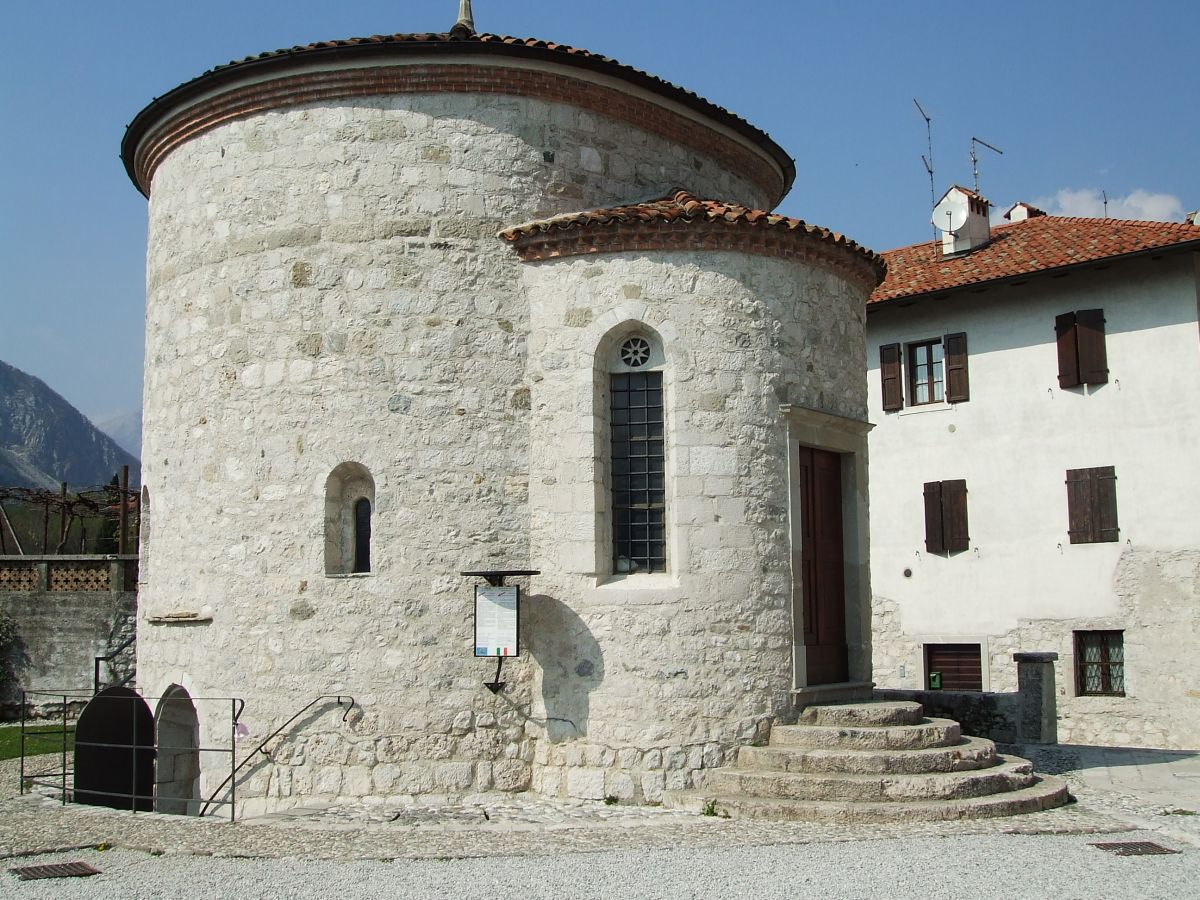
The Baptistery (formerly the Chapel of St. Michael) with the crypt of the mummies

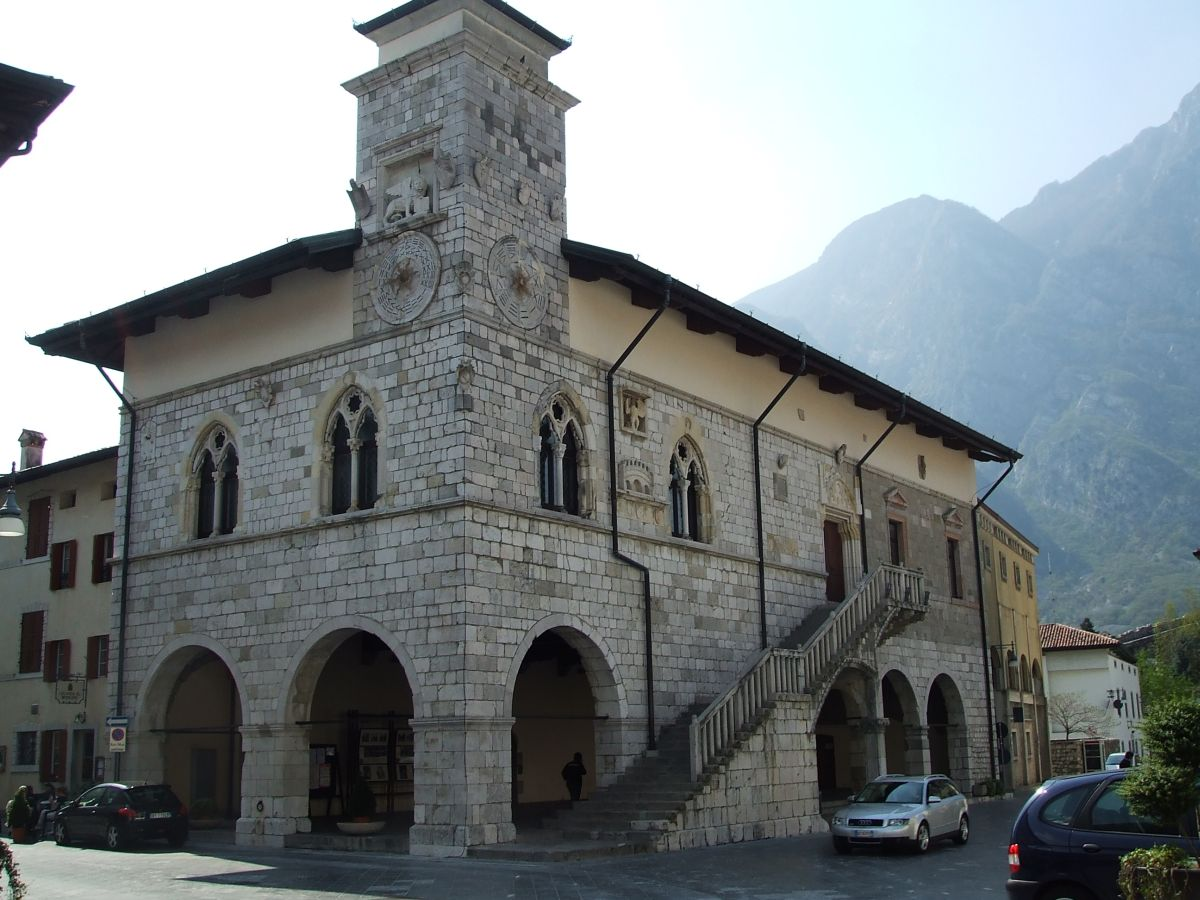
City Hall

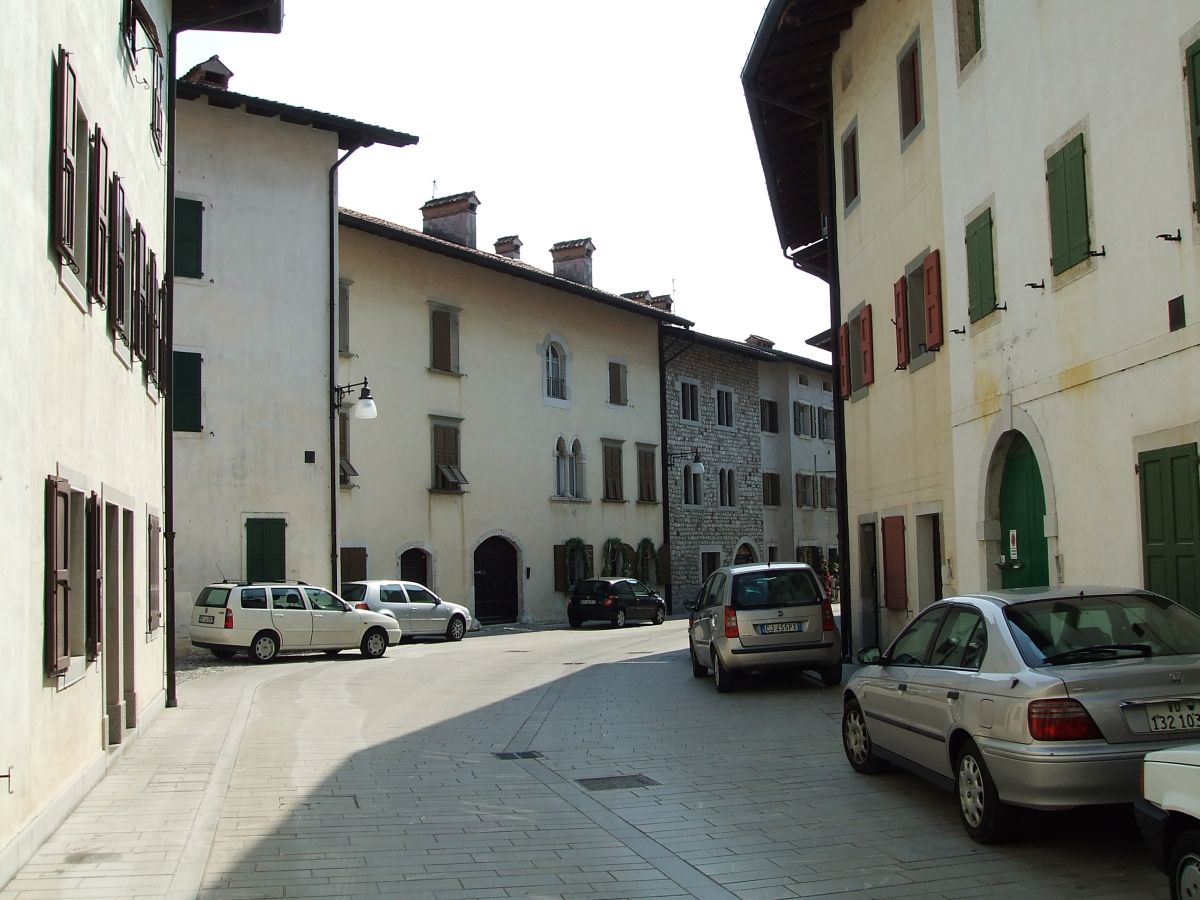
A glimpse of the historic district

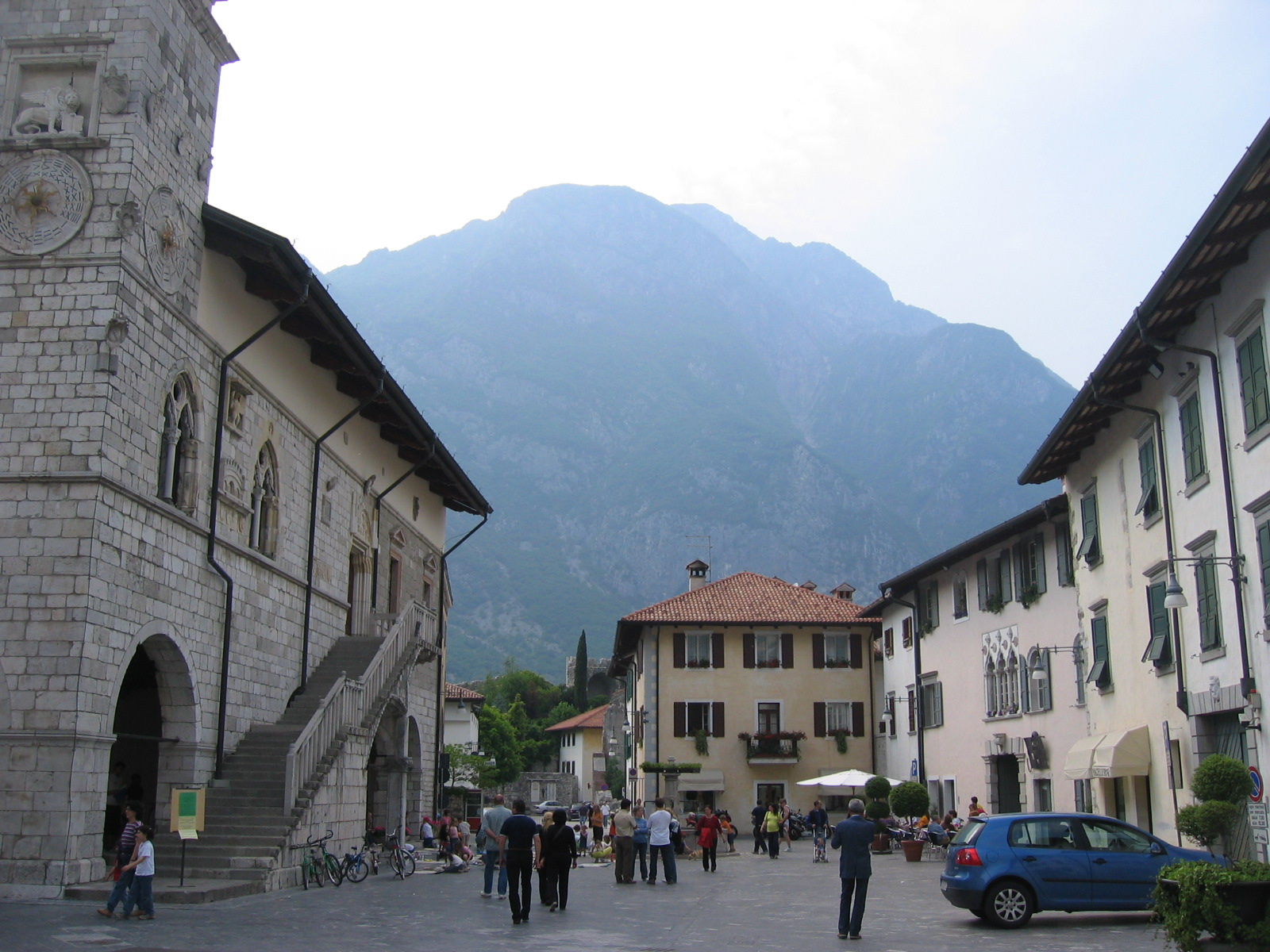
Town Hall Square

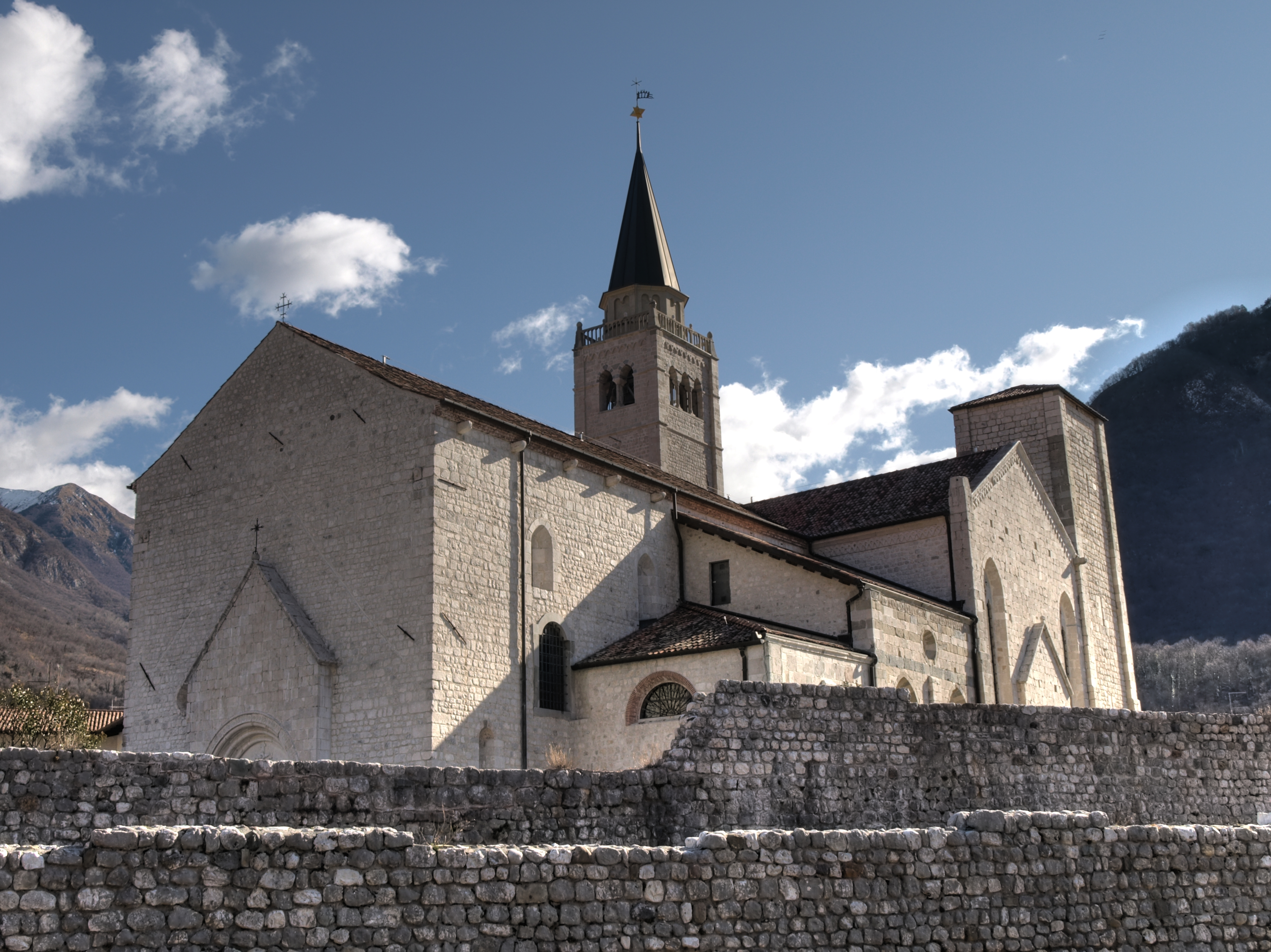
Cathedral and medieval walls

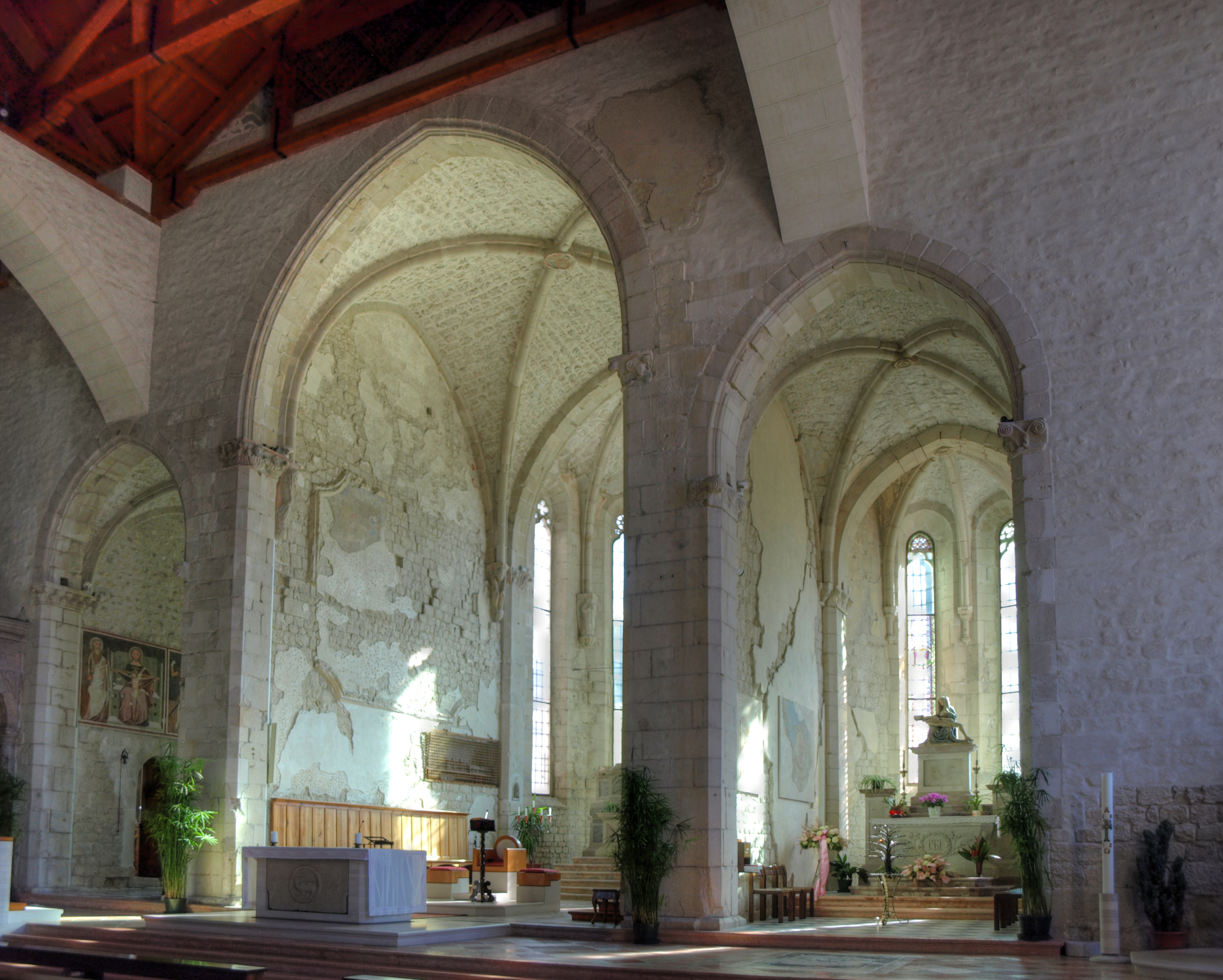
The interior of the cathedral

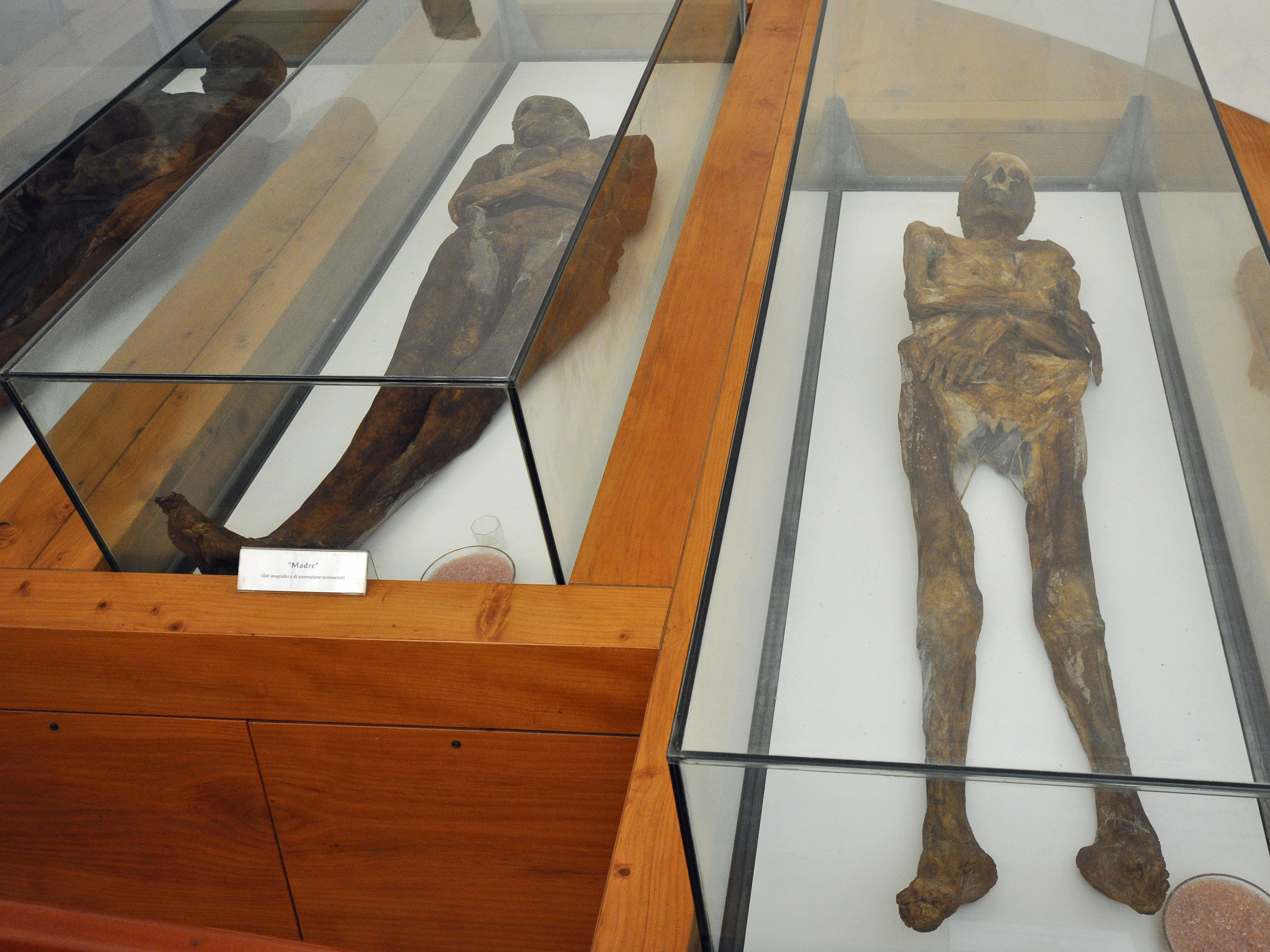
The Mummies of Venzone
