= Invorio =

- Comune
- Comune di Invorio
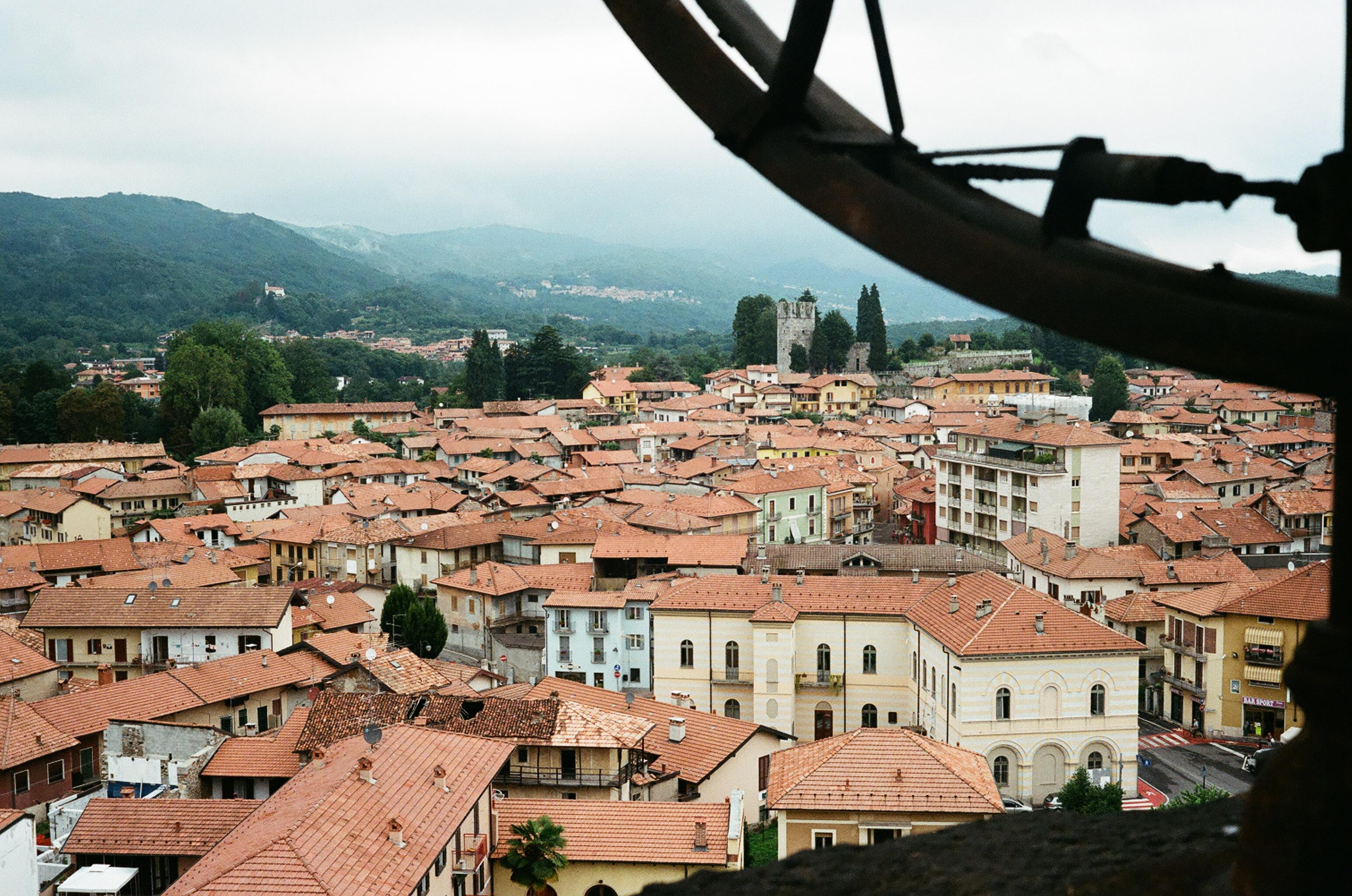
- View of Invorio

- Coat of arms

- Location within Italy Location within Piedmont
- Coordinates: 45°45′N 8°29′E
- Country: Italy
- Region: Piedmont
- Province: Novara (NO)

Government
  - Mayor: Roberto del Conte

Area
  - Total: 17.4 km^{2} (6.7 sq mi)
- Elevation: 416 m (1,365 ft)

Population (Dec. 2004)
  - Total: 3,958
  - Density: 227/km^{2} (589/sq mi)
- Demonym: Invoriesi
- Time zone: UTC+1 (CET)
  - Summer (DST): UTC+2 (CEST)
- Postal code: 28045
- Dialing code: 0322
- Website: Official website

Invorio is a comune (municipality) in the Province of Novara in the Italian region of Piedmont, located about 100 kilometres (62 mi) northeast of Turin and about 35 kilometres (22 mi) northwest of Novara. Invorio borders the following municipalities: Ameno, Arona, Bolzano Novarese, Borgomanero, Briga Novarese, Colazza, Gattico-Veruno, Gozzano, Meina, and Paruzzaro.

== Image gallery ==
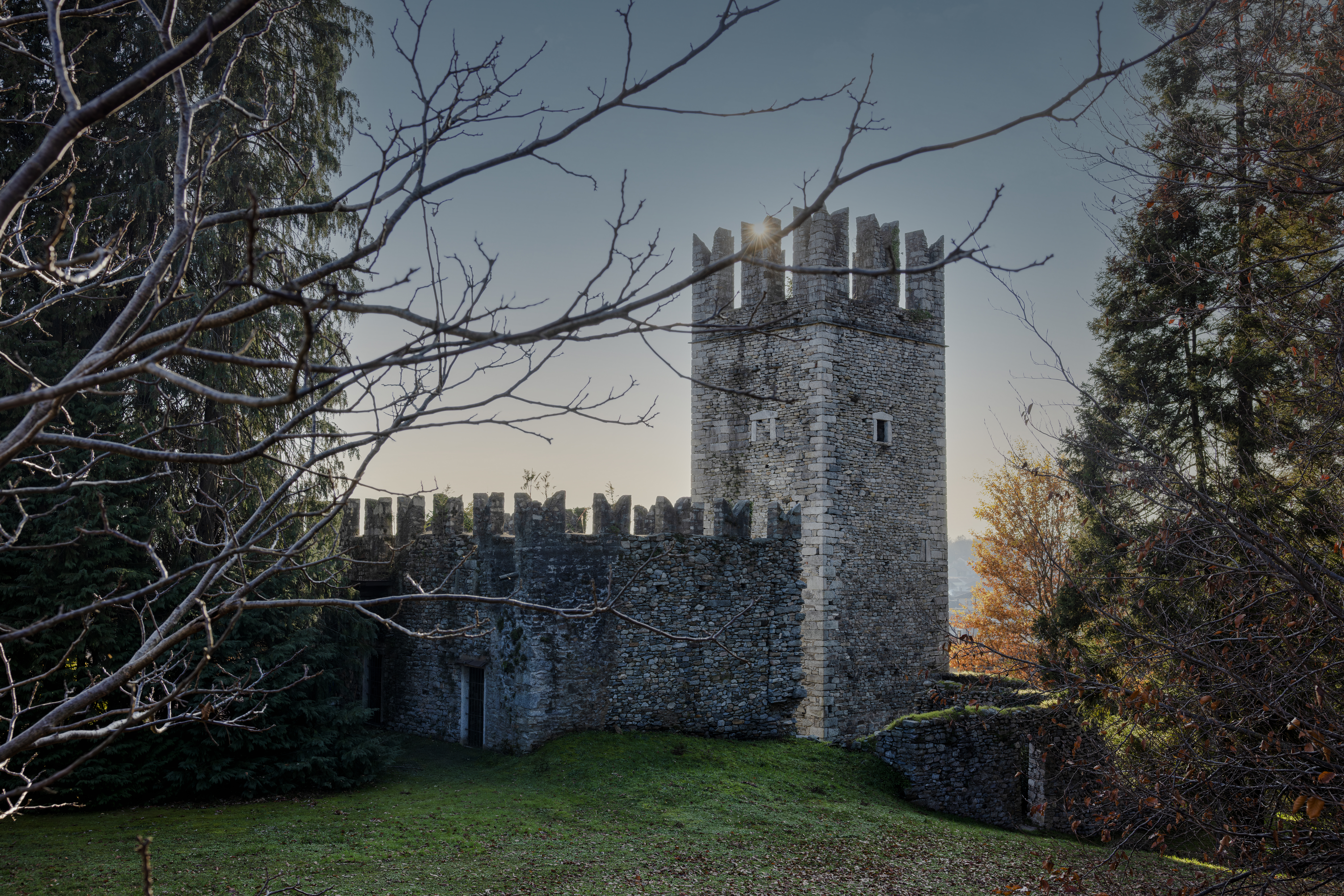
The tower and the surviving walls of the Visconti castle of Invorio

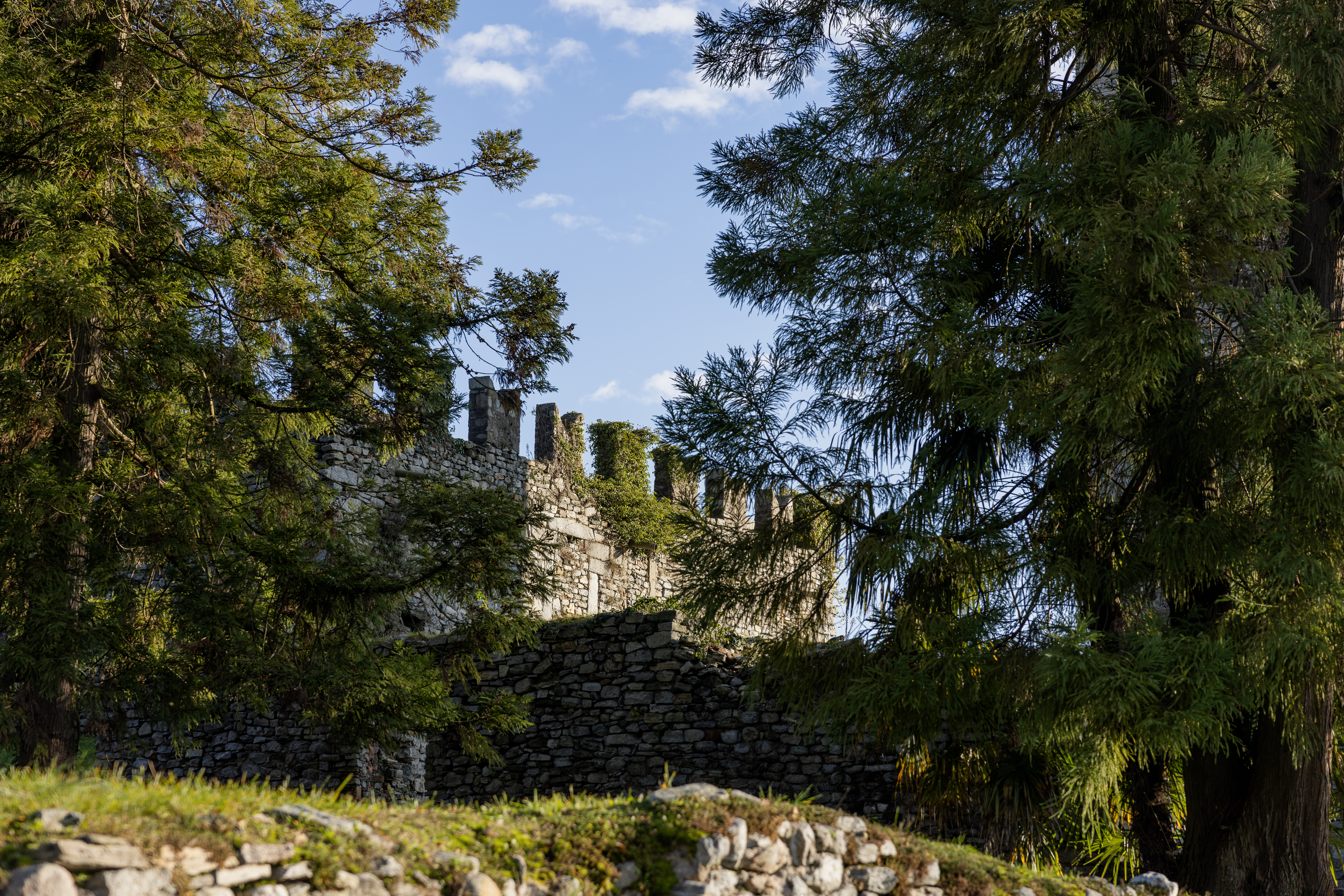
Detail of the walls surrounding the surviving Tower of the Visconti Castle of Invorio.

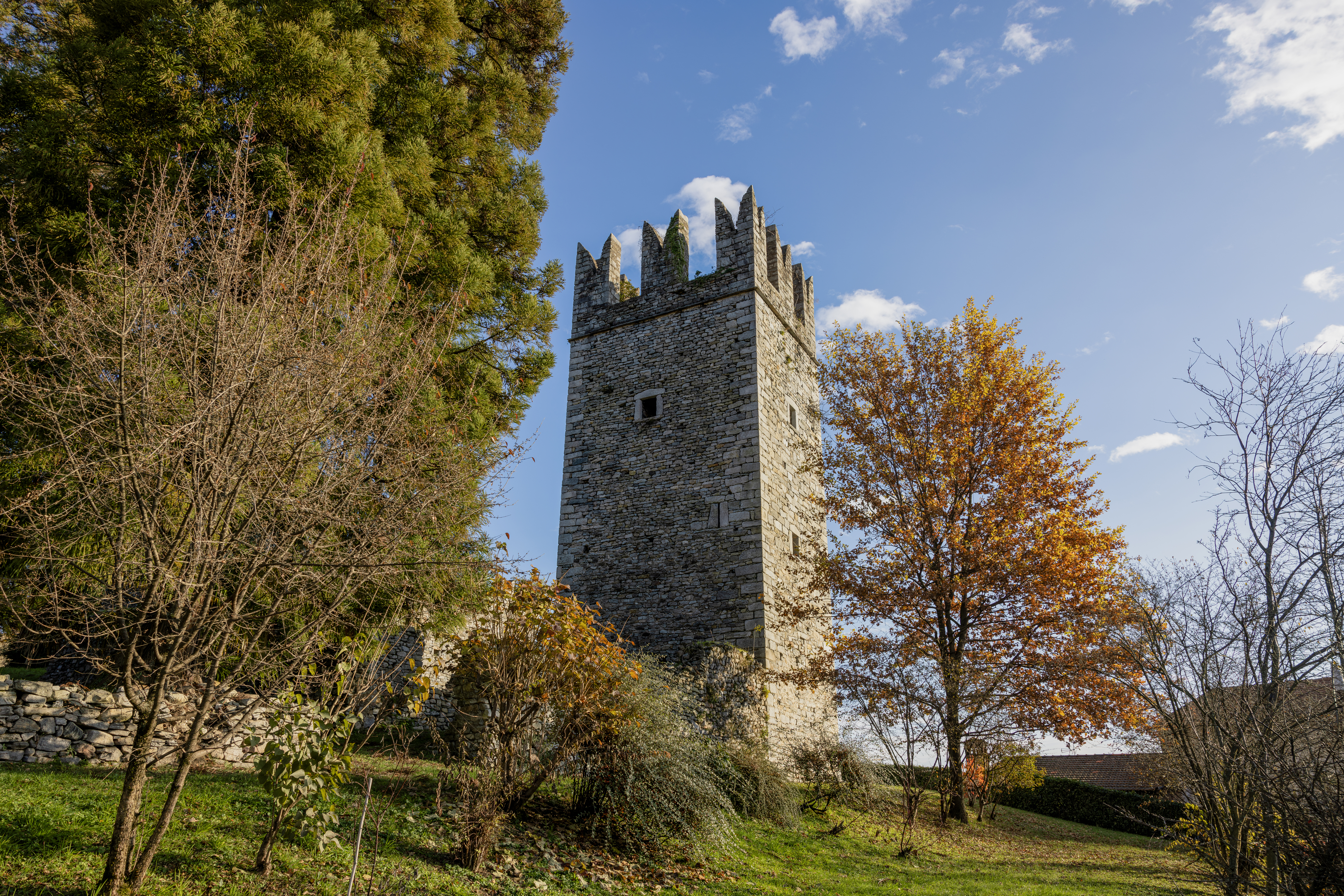
The tower of the Visconti castle of Invorio

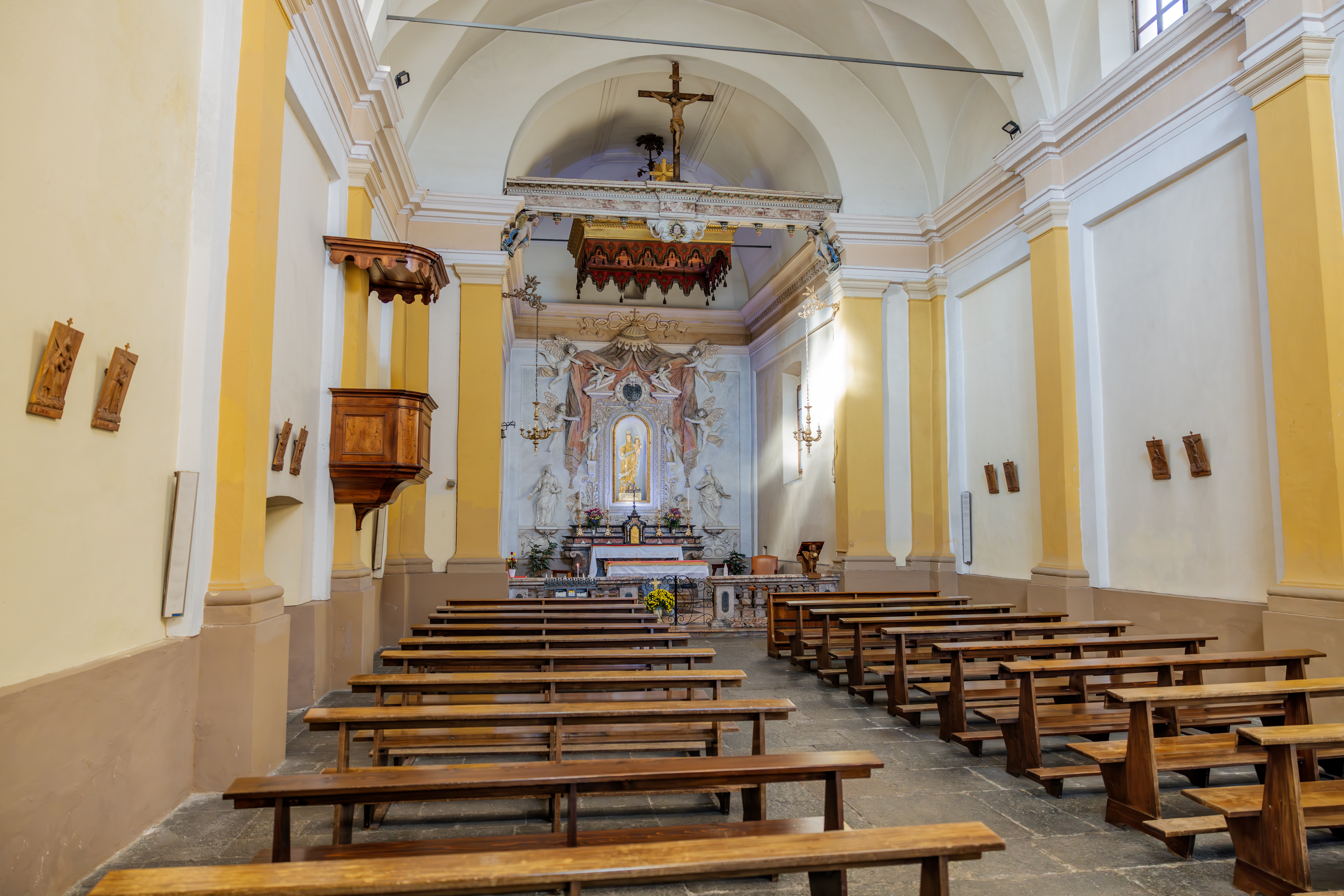
Interior of the Church of Madonna del Carmine in Invorio

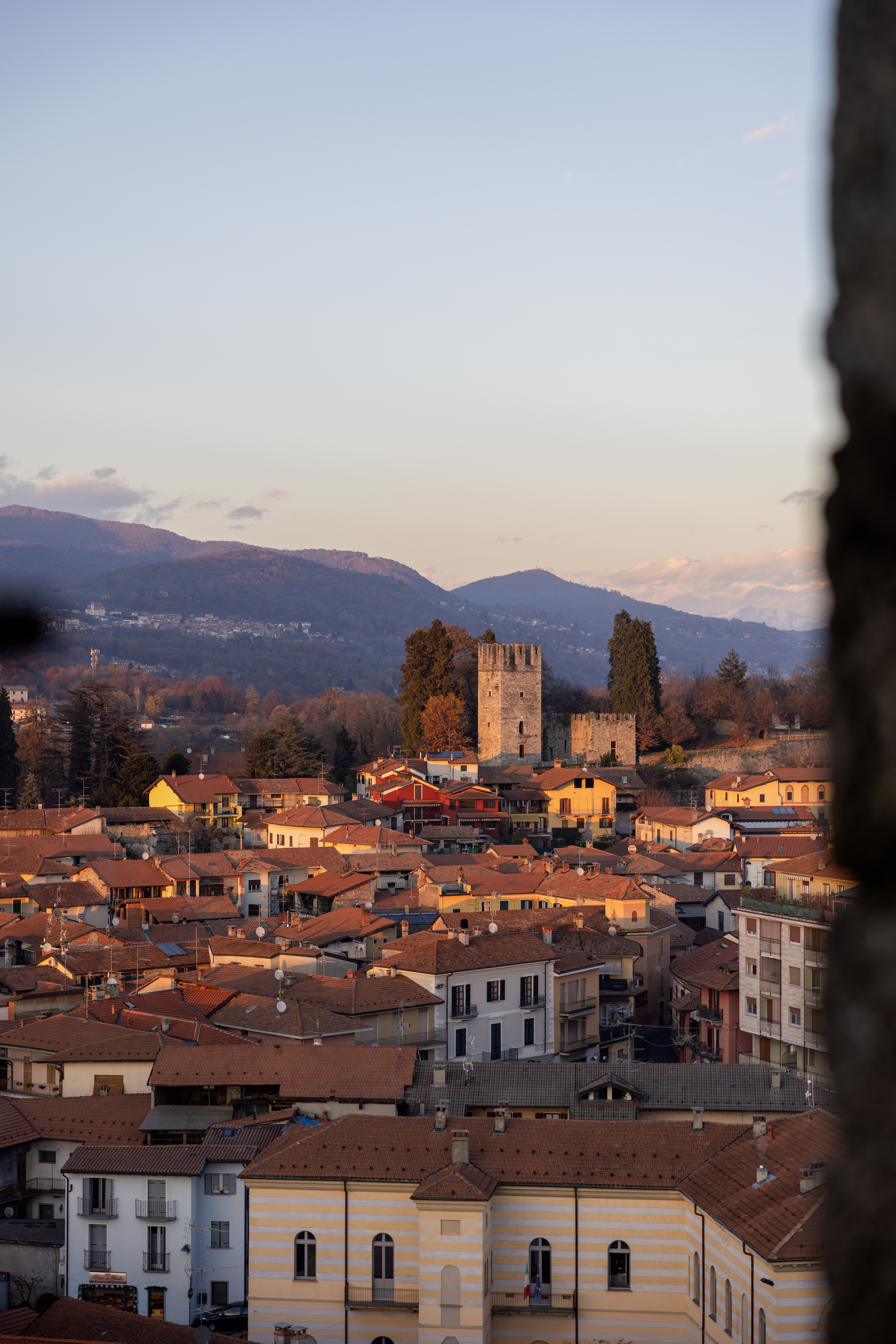
Panorama of Invorio at sunset, seen from the bell tower of the Church of Saints Peter and Paul

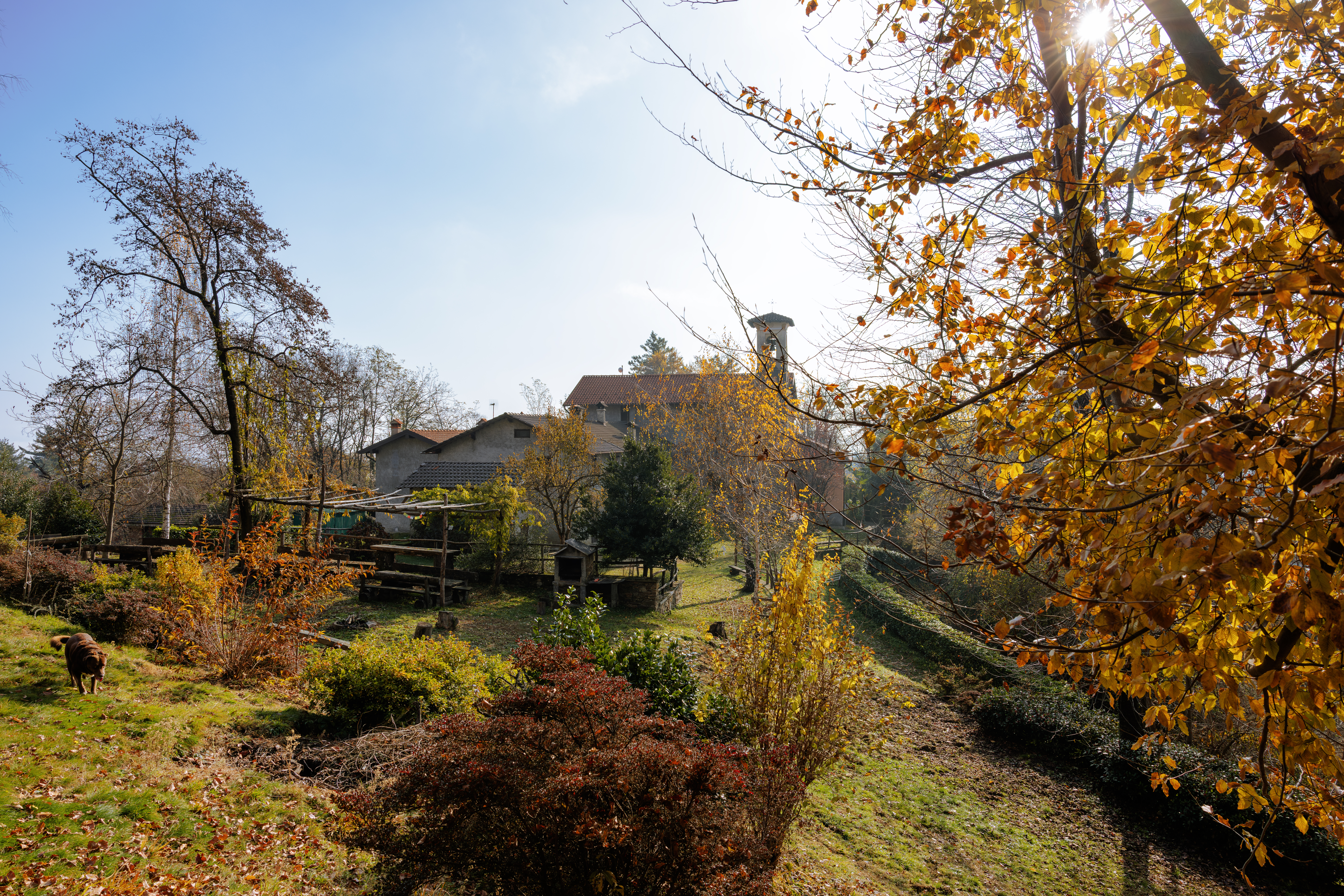
Santa Maria Annunziata Del Barro, an ancient church on Monte Barro (Invorio, NO), with its apse dated 1484.
