= San Marcello, Paruzzaro =

Church building in Paruzzaro, Italy

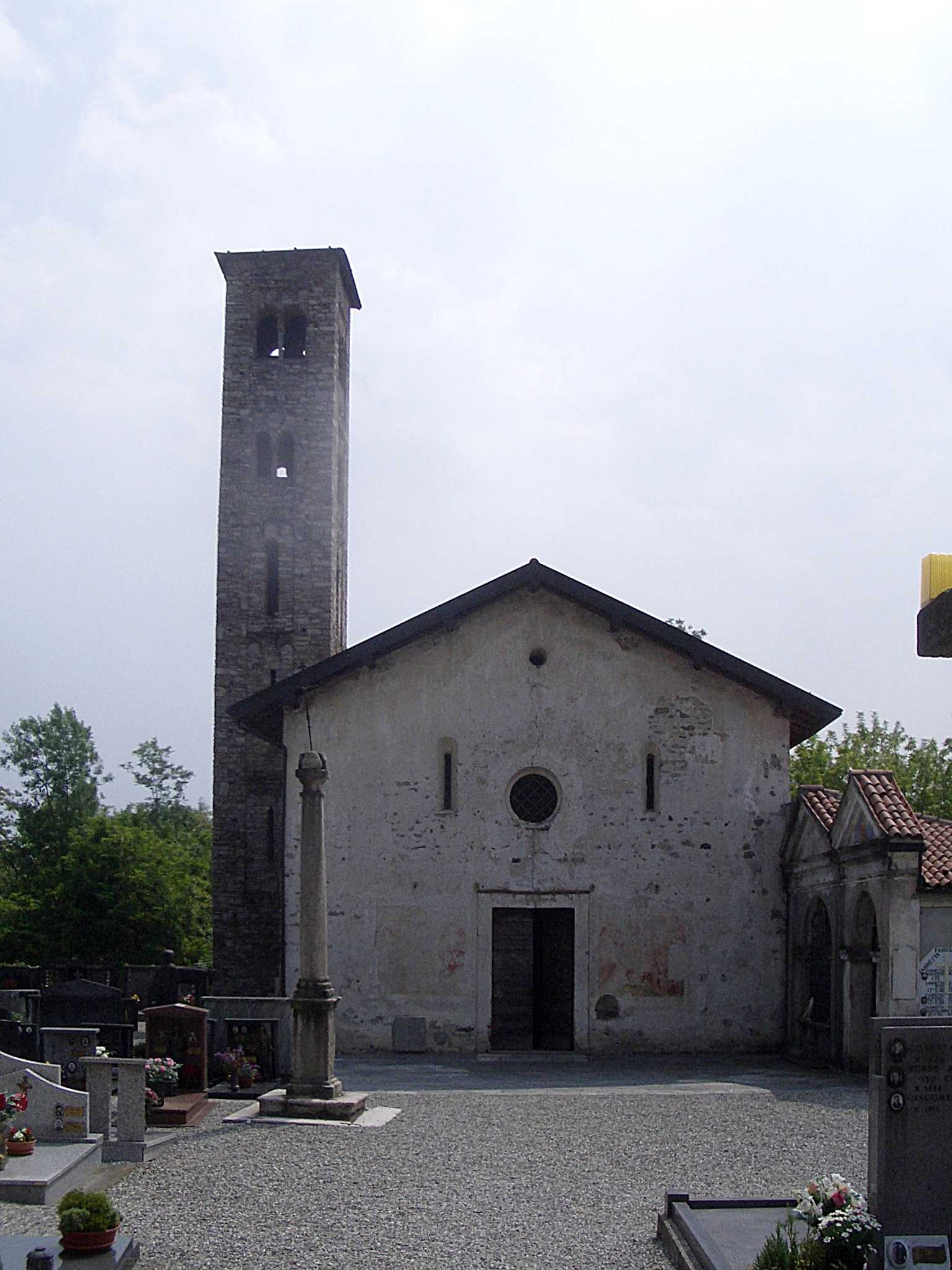

The church of Saint Marcellus (Italian: Chiesa di San Marcello) is a Roman Catholic church in Paruzzaro, province and diocese of Novara, Italy. It is dedicated to Pope Marcellus I.

== Gallery ==
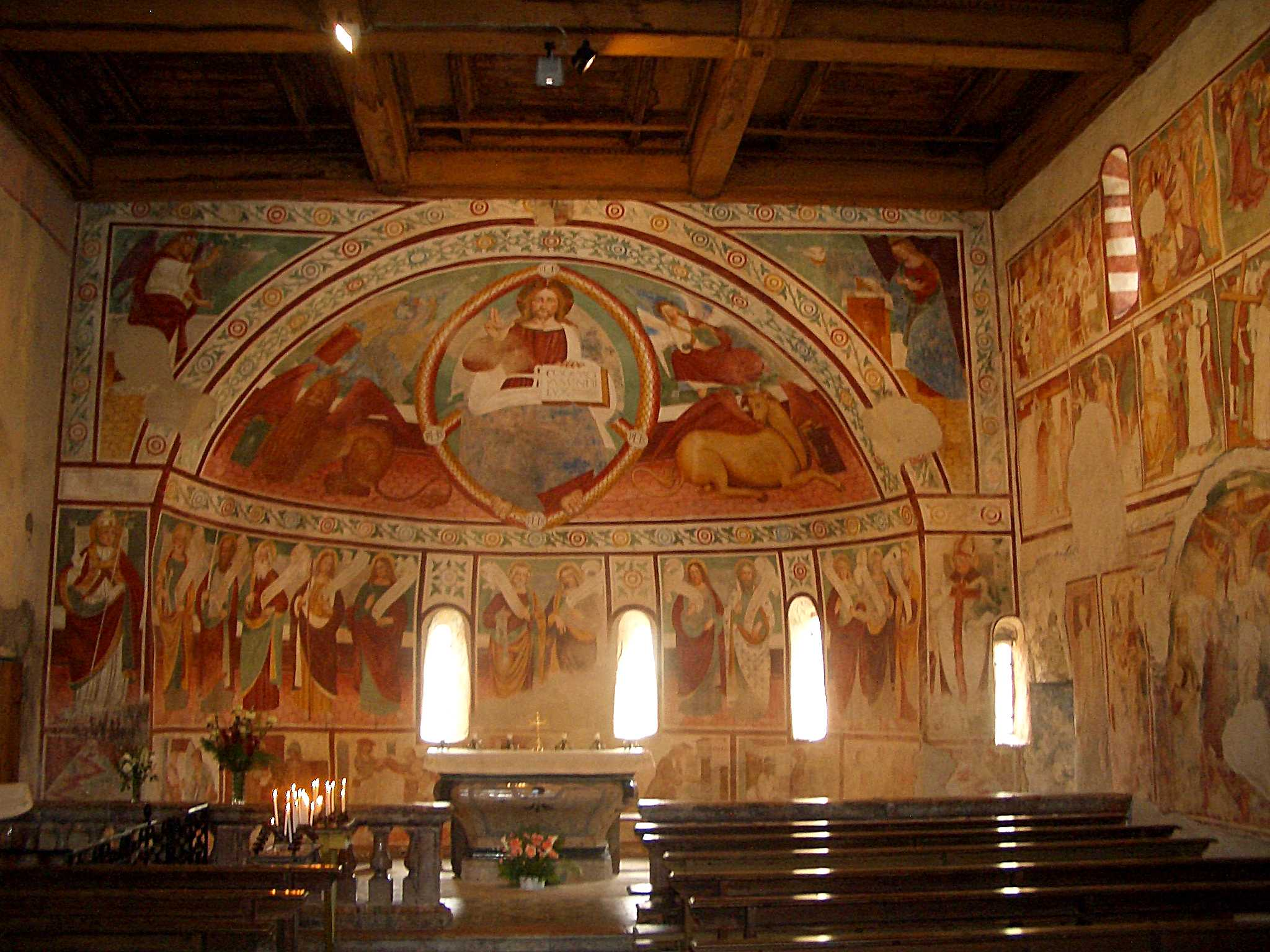
Interno della chiesa

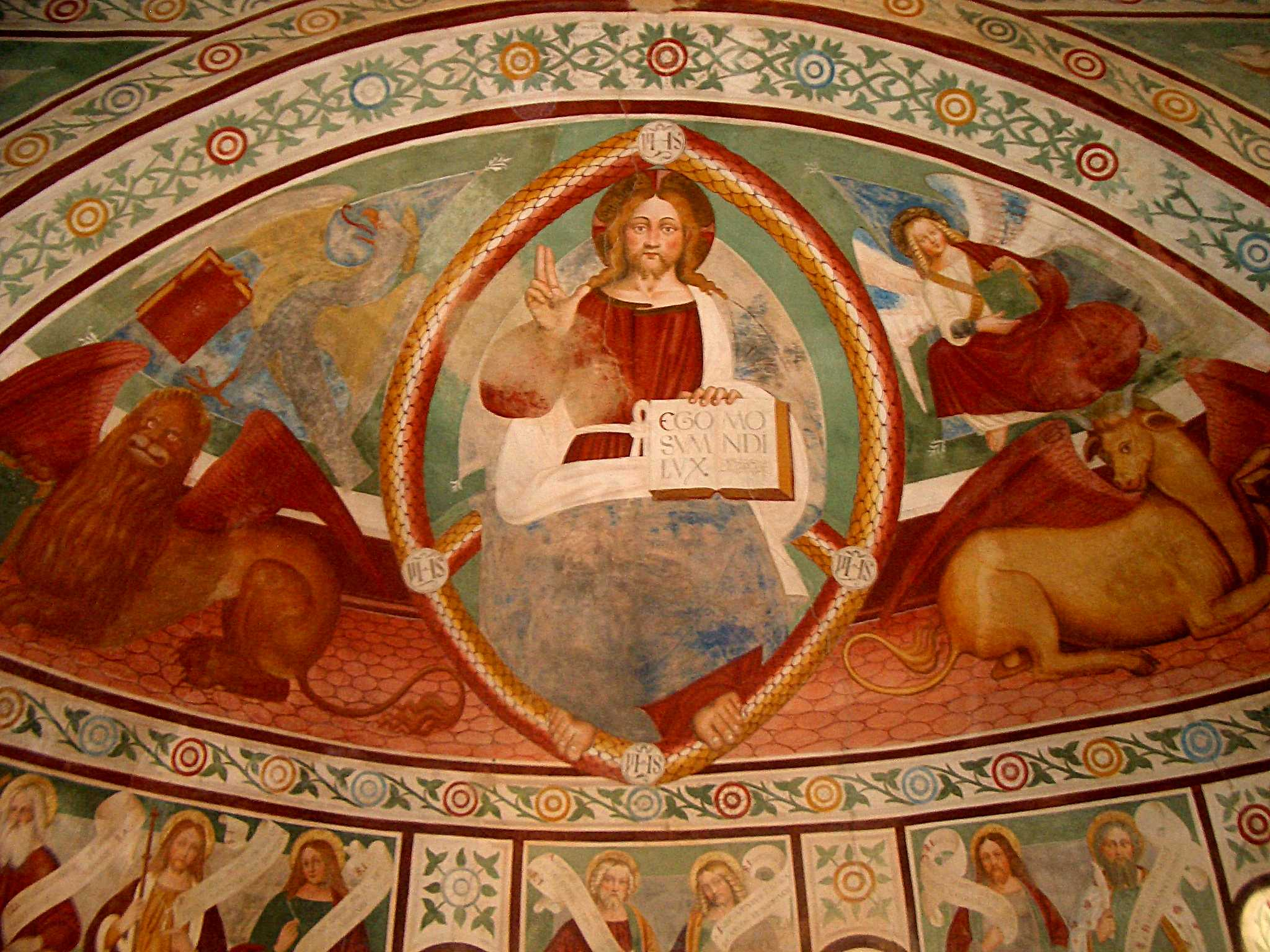
Cristo pantocratore e simboli del Tetramorfo

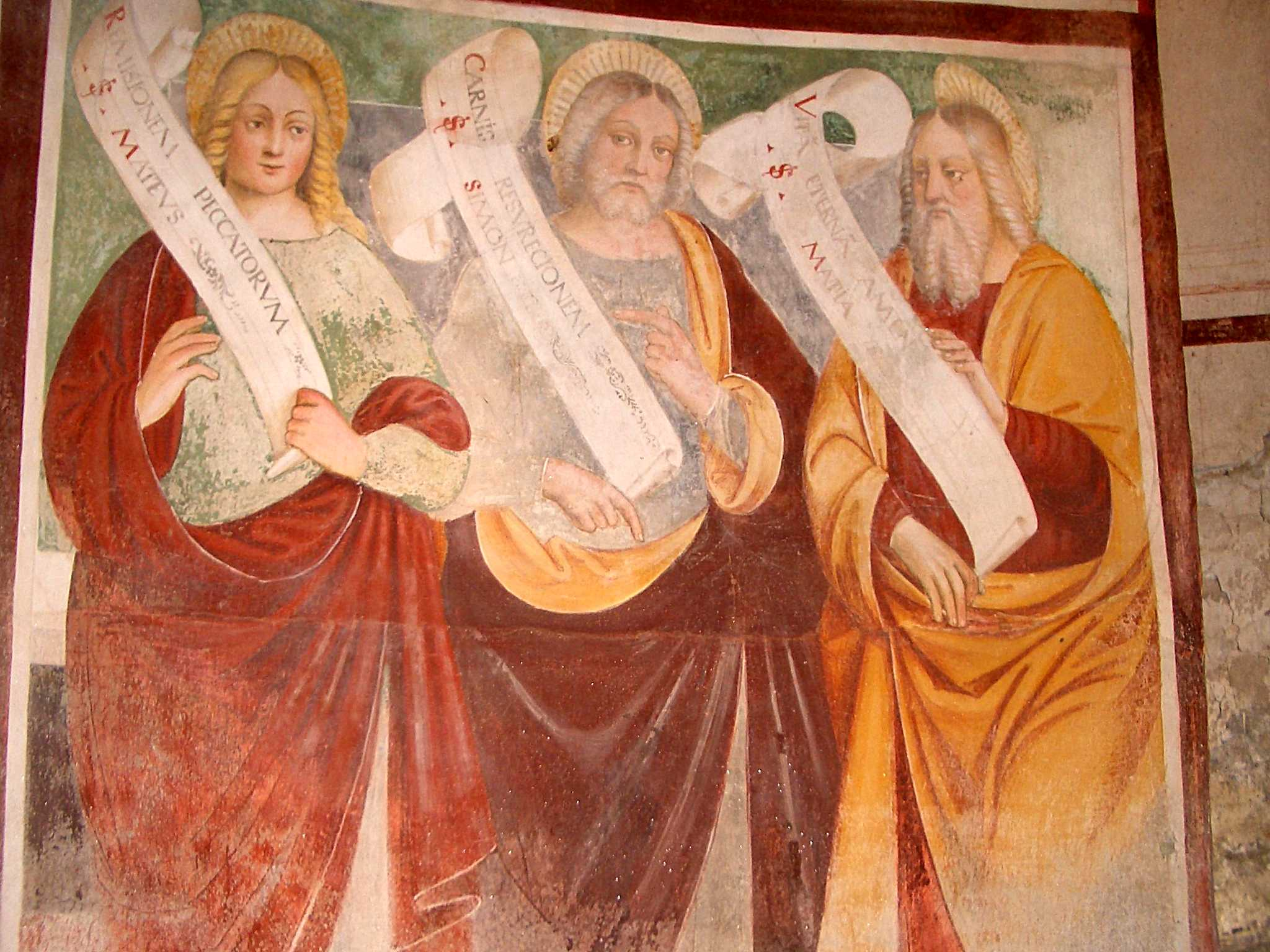
Gli apostoli Matteo, Simone "zelota" e Mattia

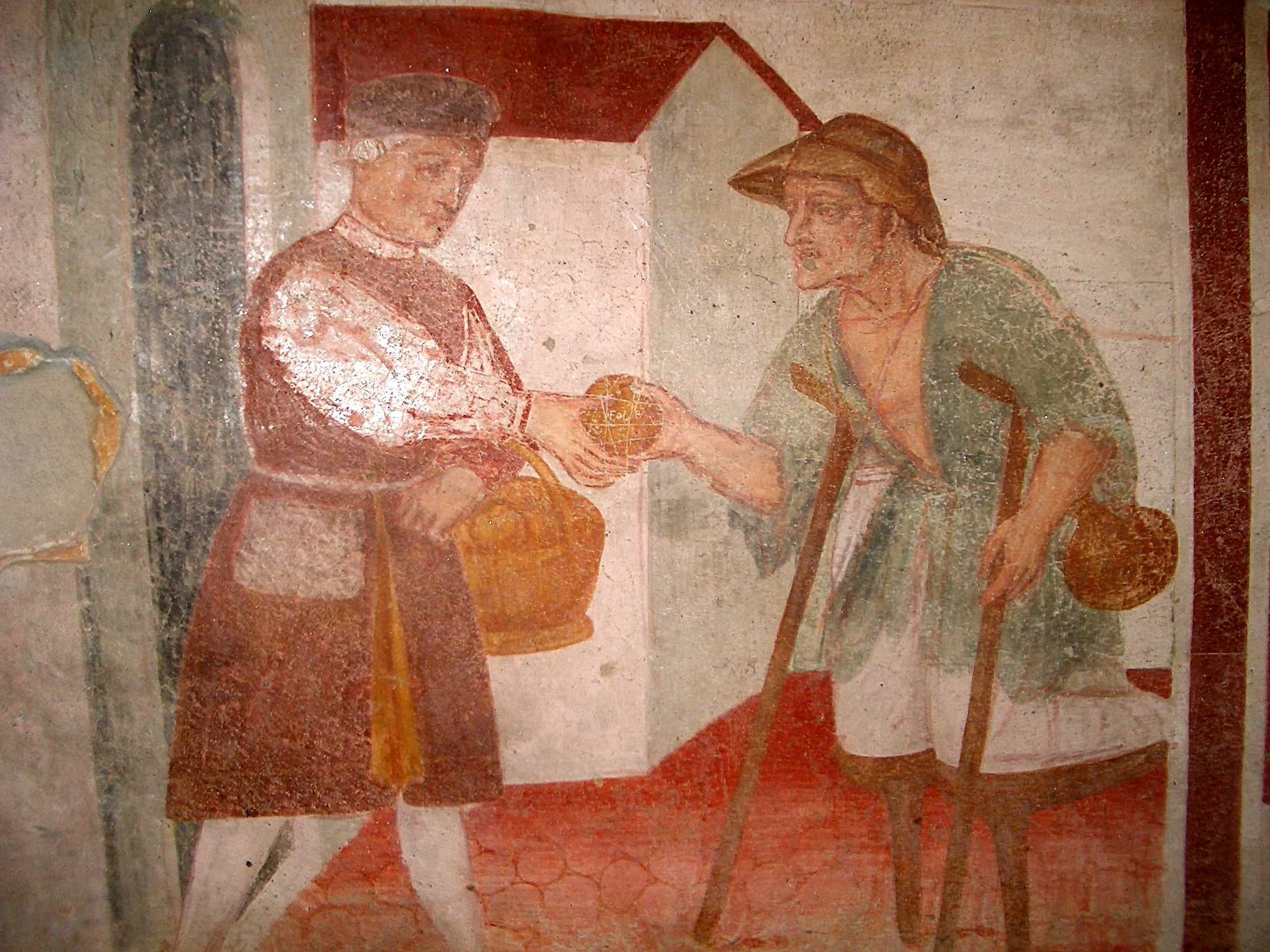
Opere di misericordia, dar da mangiare agli affamati

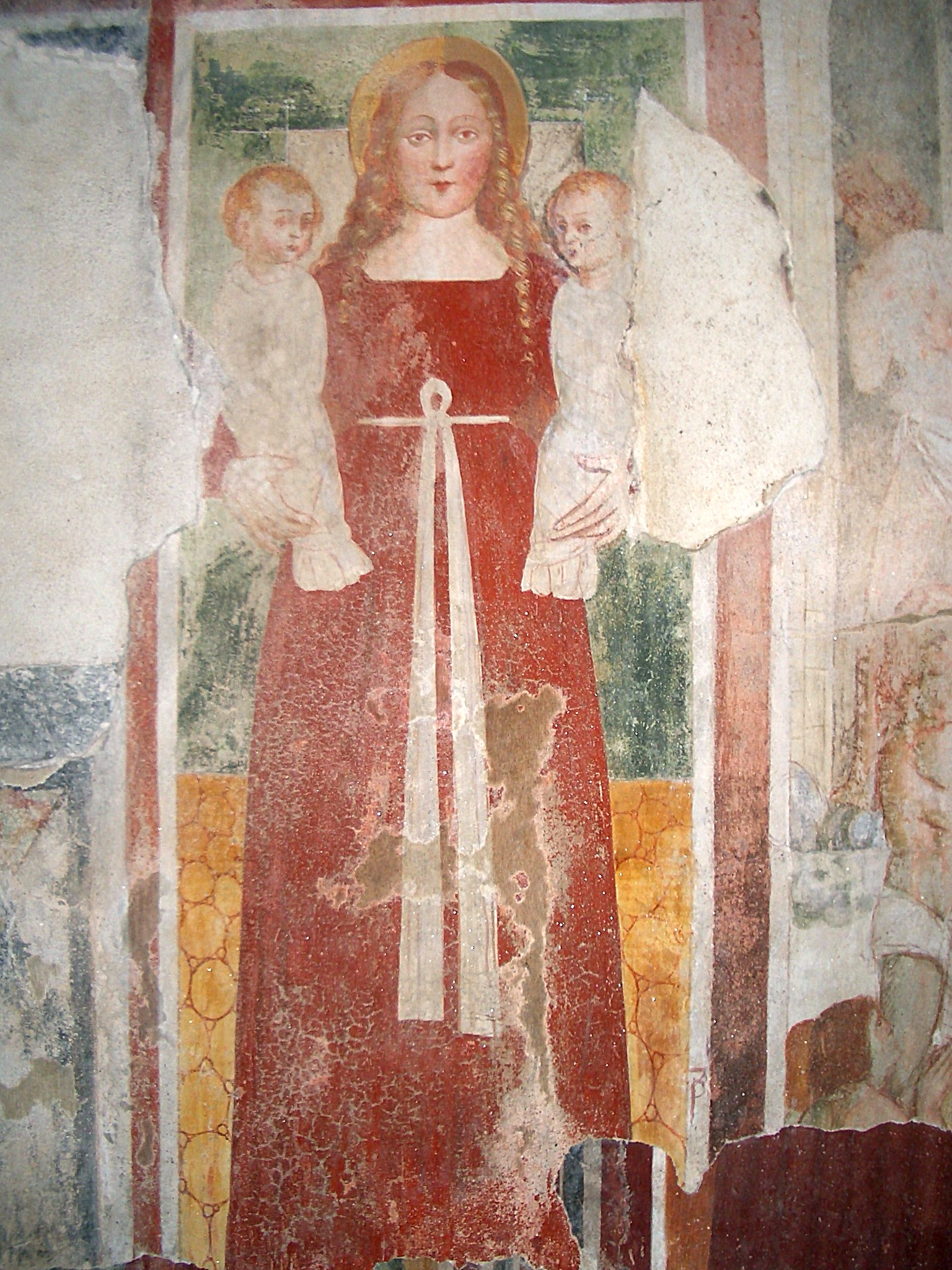
Santa Liberata

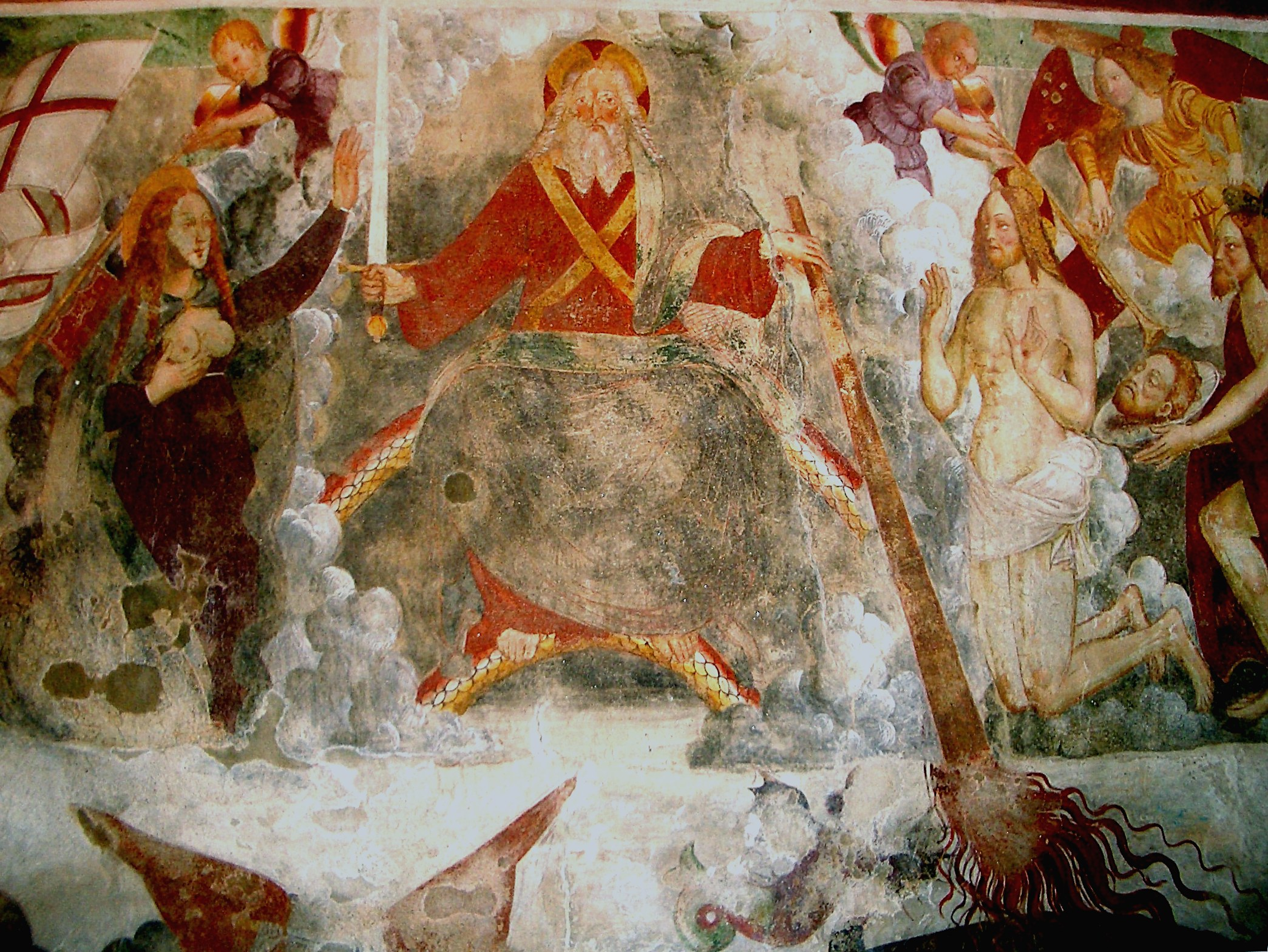
Giudizio universale, Dio Padre tra la Madonna e Gesù Cristo

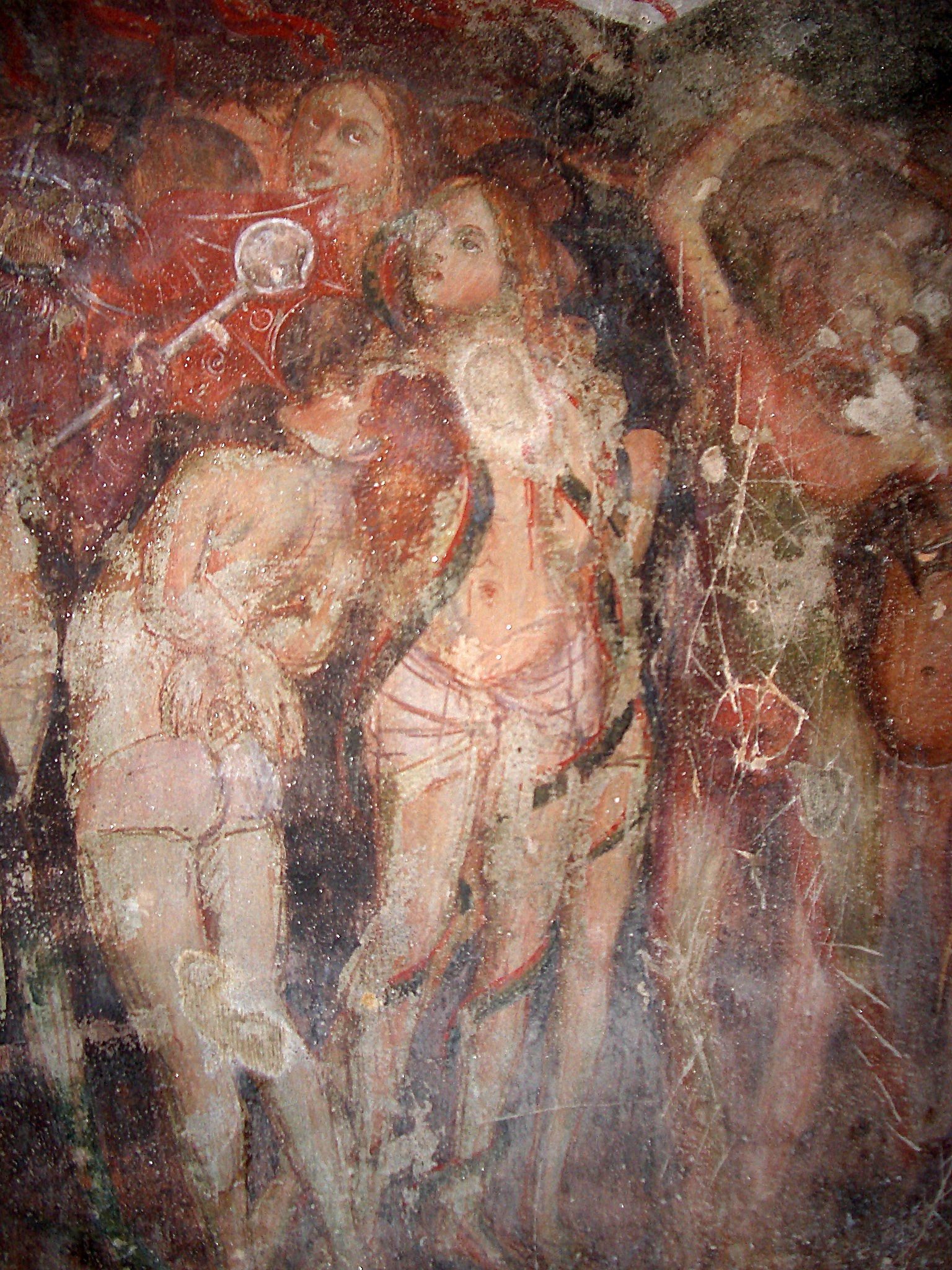
Giudizio universale, anime dannate

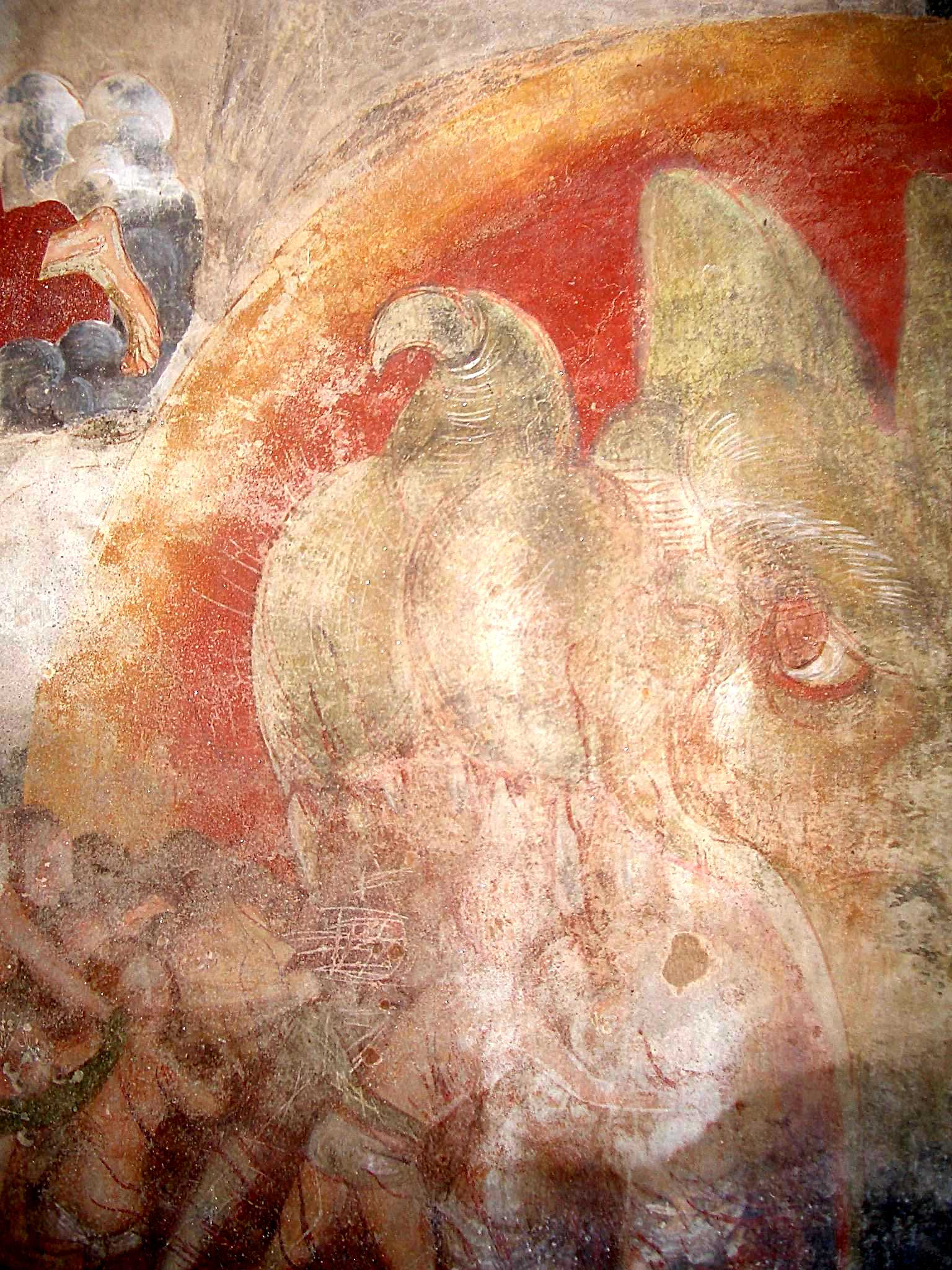
Giudizio universale, la Porta dell'Inferno

== Literature ==
- Cavallino, Roberta; Godio, Daniele (2003). "Visita alla Chiesa di San Marcello". Quaderni de "i sentieri del passato" (PDF) (in Italian). Provincia di Novara, Assessorato alla Cultura. pp. 43–48.
