= Paruzzaro =

- Comune
- Comune di Paruzzaro
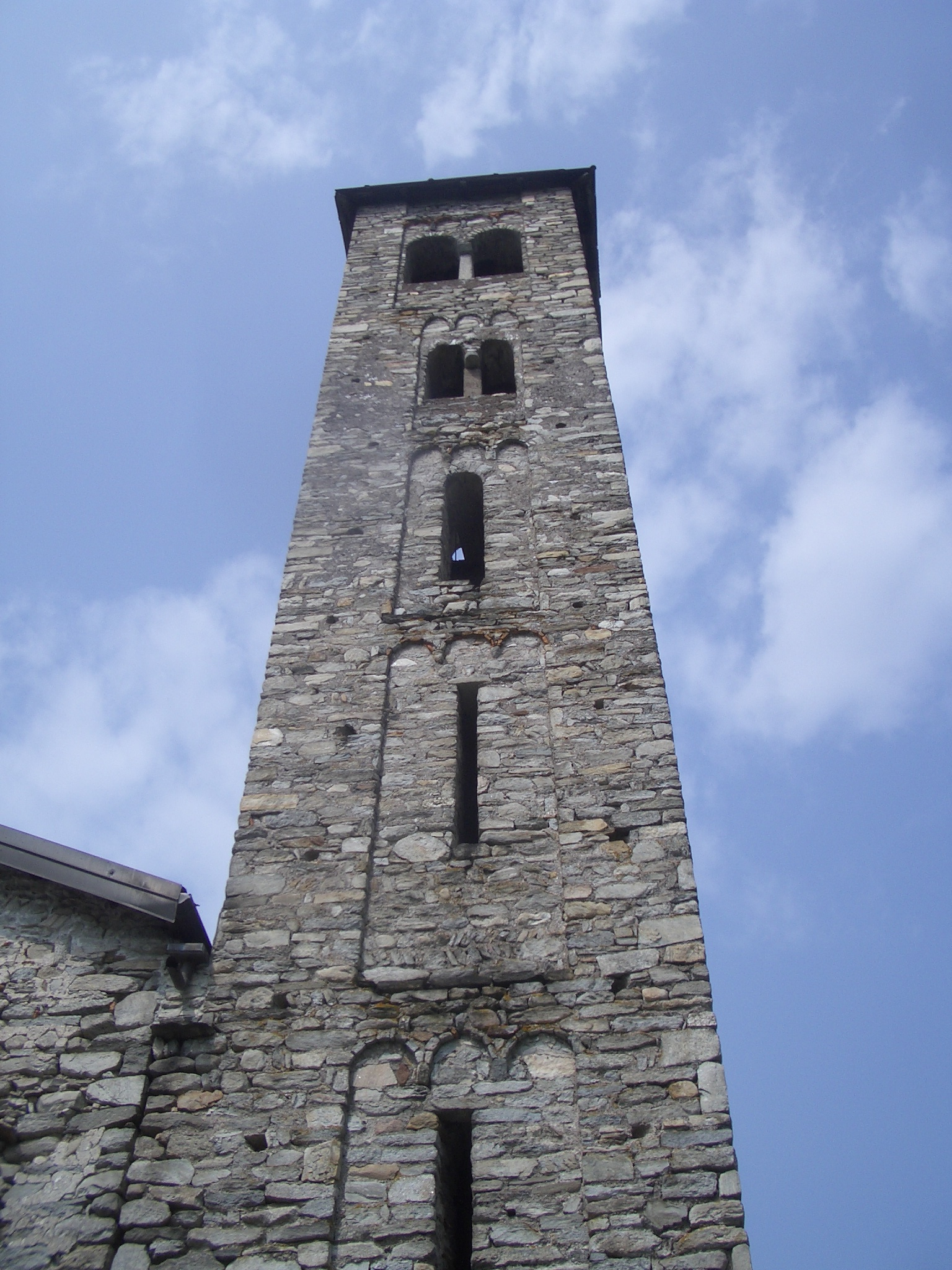
- Bell tower of San Marcello

- Coat of arms

- Location within Italy Location within Piedmont
- Coordinates: 45°44′N 8°31′E
- Country: Italy
- Region: Piedmont
- Province: Novara (NO)

Government
  - Mayor: Mauro Julita

Area
  - Total: 5.4 km^{2} (2.1 sq mi)
- Elevation: 334 m (1,096 ft)

Population (31 July 2010)
  - Total: 2,021
  - Density: 370/km^{2} (970/sq mi)
- Demonym: Paruzzaresi
- Time zone: UTC+1 (CET)
  - Summer (DST): UTC+2 (CEST)
- Postal code: 28040
- Dialing code: 0322
- Website: Official website

Paruzzaro is a comune (municipality) in the Province of Novara in the Italian region of Piedmont, located about 100 kilometres (62 mi) northeast of Turin and about 30 kilometres (19 mi) north of Novara.

Paruzzaro borders the following municipalities: Arona, Gattico-Veruno, Invorio, and Oleggio Castello. The municipal territory is home to the Romanesque church of San Marcello (late 10th-early 11th century). There is a fresco cycle by 15th–16th-century local artists in the church. Another noteworthy monument is the church of San Siro.

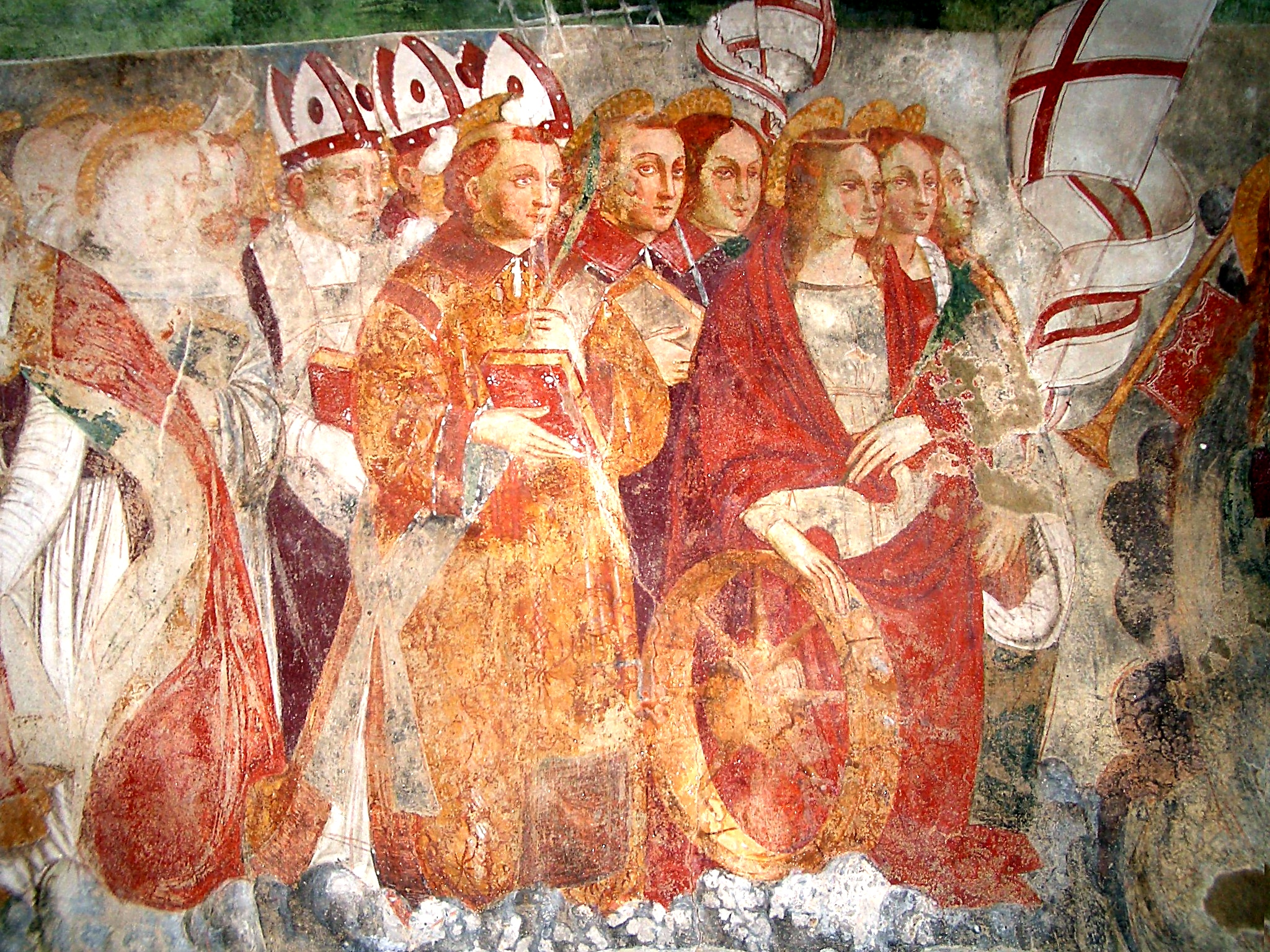
Detail of the Last Judgement fresco in the church of San Marcello, attributed to Sperindio Cagnola
