= San Siro, Paruzzaro =

Church in Paruzzaro, Italy

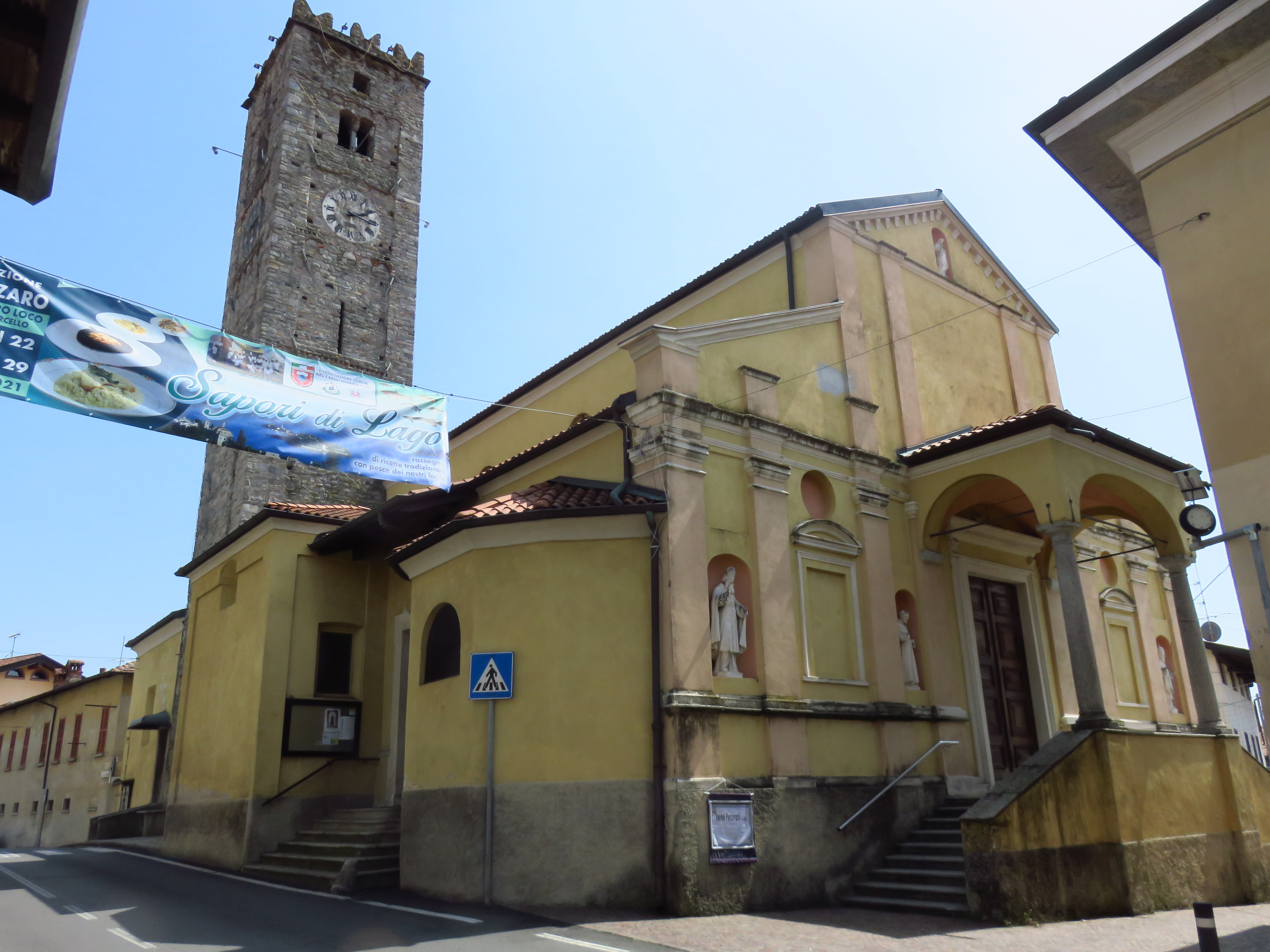

The church of Saint Syrus (Italian: Chiesa di San Siro) is a Roman Catholic church in Paruzzaro, province and diocese of Novara, Italy. It is dedicated to Saint Syrus of Pavia.

The original chapel of San Siro, built in the 12th century, was a branch of the parish church of San Giuliano di Gozzano. Between 1591 and 1595, the church underwent renovation work commissioned by Bishop Cesare Speciano. it was then consecrated by Bishop Carlo Bascapè in that same year. In 1874, the vault of the building was raised and decorated, while in 1934 the façade was embellished with four statues.
