= Rolando de' Rossi =

Italian nobleman and statesman (1285–1345)

Rolando de' Rossi (c. 1285 – May 1345) was an Italian nobleman and statesman. He was the dominant force in the politics of the commune of Parma from 1322 until 1335, effectively as signore between 1328 and 1331. Under him and his brother, the city accepted the lordship of the King of Bohemia between 1331 and 1333. Ultimately, the failure of his family's political project brought an end Parmesan autonomy. In his later years he was a condottiero for Venice and Florence.

== Life ==
=== Exile, return and rise ===
Rolando was born in the mid-1280s in Parma. He was probably the eldest son of Guglielmo de' Rossi and Donella of the Da Carrara family. His brothers were Marsilio and Pietro. During the rule of Giberto III da Correggio over Parma, the Rossi fled to Borgo San Donnino. There in July 1314, Rolando injured his hands in a brawl. He returned to Parma the following month and his influence in Parma grew rapidly over the next two years. With Gianquirico Sanvitale, Obizzo da Enzola and Paolo Aldighieri, he arranged Giberto's ouster in July 1316.

For the next six years, the Rossi and Sanvitale families were dominant in Parma. In 1322, Rolando imprisoned Gianquirico, sent his allies into exile and made peace with the Da Correggio. He allied himself with the Guelphs, and progressively built up his power. In June 1325, the papal legate Cardinal Bertrand du Pouget appointed him capitaneus Ecclesiae, captain of the Church, with an income of 30 florins per diem. This allowed him to live, in the words of the Chronicon parmense, "very honorably" (multum honorifice). With a large army under his command, he won several victories in Italy for the absentee Papacy. By November 1325, he and his brother, Ugolino, who was the bishop, invited back all exiles who were willing to proclaim themselves allies.

In 1326, Rolando's relationship with the church deteriorated. On 30 September, Cardinal Bertrand asserted papal authority in Parma and imposed himself as signore in accordance with the bull Si fratrum. By the end of the year, he had released Gianquirico Sanvitale. In the summer of 1328, with King Louis IV of Germany in Italy to receive the crown of the Holy Roman Empire, Rolando forced the papal government out of Parma and allied himself with the Cangrande della Scala.

=== Signore ===
On 25 September 1328, the general council of Parma met to confer on Rolando and a council of eight wise men the balìa (supreme power) of the city at the expense of the council of elders. In the words of the Chronicon parmense, "Roland indeed was lord of the city and district, and all things were done as he instructed and wished." From this point he was effectively signore. In October he strengthened his alliance with the Scaligers by marrying his five-year-old daughter Maddalucia to Cangrande's illegitimate son Francesco (or Franceschino). He then spent Christmas at Cangrande's court.

On 26 February 1329, Rolando was appointed captain of stipendiaries and then appointed his own privy council (consiglio di credenza) of 100 loyal men. Playing the part of a signore, he added a loggia to his house in the district of San Giovanni, where he prominently displayed his arms, and went about in public only with a large bodyguard. That year Pontremoli submitted to the commune of Parma and to Rolando personally. When Cangrande died in July, he went to Bologna to make peace with Cardinal Bertrand, but the cardinal arrested him for refusing to make peace with the Sanvitale. In Parma, Marsilio took over his powers.

Rolando was freed in January 1331. By this time, Louis IV had left Italy and his supporter, King John of Bohemia, had arrived. The Rossi submitted Parma to John and in return were granted the rank of count. Roland accompanied John's son and heir, Charles (the future Emperor Charles IV), on several diplomatic missions in 1332–33. After John and Charles let Italy permanently, Rolando turned again to the legate and received a vicariate over Parma and Lucca. This put him at odds with his former Ghibelline allies, like the Scaligers. By the end of 1333, the Rossi were once again in complete charge of Parma.

=== Decline and fall ===
In January 1334, Rolando went to Bologna to request military assistance from Cardinal Bertrand against the Scaligers. He was forced to once again submit Parma to the legate. In April, he was given complete control of foreign policy in order to do so. There was also a financial crisis in Parma in 1334, forcing Rolando to convoke the council of eight wise men with which he theoretically shared power. He chose the eight from within his circle of allies.

Throughout 1334 and into 1335, the countryside around Parma was devastated by the Scaligers and their Da Correggio allies. Rolando imposed new taxes to cover the loss of revenue from reduced commerce. The consequent unrest in the city forced him to look abroad for help. In November, he was at Avignon to request help directly from the papacy. Unsuccessful, he offered the signoria of Parma to the Visconti of Milan, rivals of the Scaligers. This also failed and on 15 June 1335 Parma dispatched two envoys (one chosen by the general council and another by Rolando) to submit the city to the Scaligers. On 18 June the surrender was read out publicly. On 21 June, Alberto II della Scala arrived in the city to fanfare, marking "the end of the commune ideal in Parma".

=== Condottiero ===
The Scaligers confirmed the Rossi in many of their positions. On 8 July 1335, Rolando hired some German mercenaries left unemployed by the city of Reggio after it fell to the Scaligers. By the spring of 1336, however, Roland and his two brothers were effectively under arrest. They escaped to Venice. When Venice allied with Florence in a war against the Scaligers, Rolando joined the Florentine army and in July 1336 took part in the siege of Lucca, which was defended by Azzo da Correggio. Rolando's brothers died in 1337 and he was invited by Venice to take command of its army.

In February 1338, Venice rejected Louis IV's peace proposal and sent an army under Rolando and Guecello Tempesta to forage in Scaliger territory. Crossing the Adige at Albaredo, they harried the land as far as Vicenza and brought back to Venice numerous captives and enormous booty of livestock, grain, hay and wine. A letter of Pope Benedict XII to the nuncio Bernardo del Lago dated October 1338 indicates that Rolando was accused of seizing assets belonging to the diocese of Vicenza during the war. A peace treaty ended the war between the Scaligers and the league on 24 January 1339. Rolando signed it on his own behalf four days later. Although it restored him and his family to their property, it did not permit him to return to Parma. He was given a monthly pension of 100 florins.

In exile, he lived in Padua under Ubertino da Carrara, whose cause he espoused in the disputed succession of Camposampiero. In 1340, he was named the sole heir of his father. In 1344, according to Guglielmo Cortusi, he traveled with Enrico da Lozzo (his son-in-law since 1338) on a mission to invite Count William II of Hainaut to visit the court of Padua. He died in May 1345 and was buried in the church of Saint Anthony alongside his brothers and his father. In the 1370s, his body was moved to the chapel being built within the church by Bonifacio Lupi.

Rolando's sons, Bertrando and Giacomo, succeeded him in his lordships.

== Bibliography ==
- Dumontel, Carla (1952). L'impresa italiana di Giovanni di Lussemburgo re di Boemia. G. Giappichelli.
- Geary, Patrick, ed. (2016). Readings in Medieval History (5th ed.). University of Toronto Press.
- Kohl, Benjamin G. (1998). Padua under the Carrara, 1318–1405. Baltimore and London: Johns Hopkins University Press. ISBN 0-8018-5703-1.
- Pagnoni, Fabrizio (2017). "Rossi, Rolando". Dizionario Biografico degli Italiani (in Italian). Vol. 88: Robusti–Roverella. Rome: Istituto dell'Enciclopedia Italiana. ISBN 978-88-12-00032-6.
- Partner, Peter (1972). The Lands of St. Peter: The Papal State in the Middle Ages and the Early Renaissance. University of California Press.
- Prescott, Orville (1972). Lords of Italy: Portraits from the Middle Ages. Harper & Row.
- Shepard, Laurie (2004). "Parma". In Christopher Kleinhenz (ed.). Medieval Italy: An Encyclopedia. Vol. 2. Routledge. pp. 855–858.
