= Scaliger War =

Military conflict

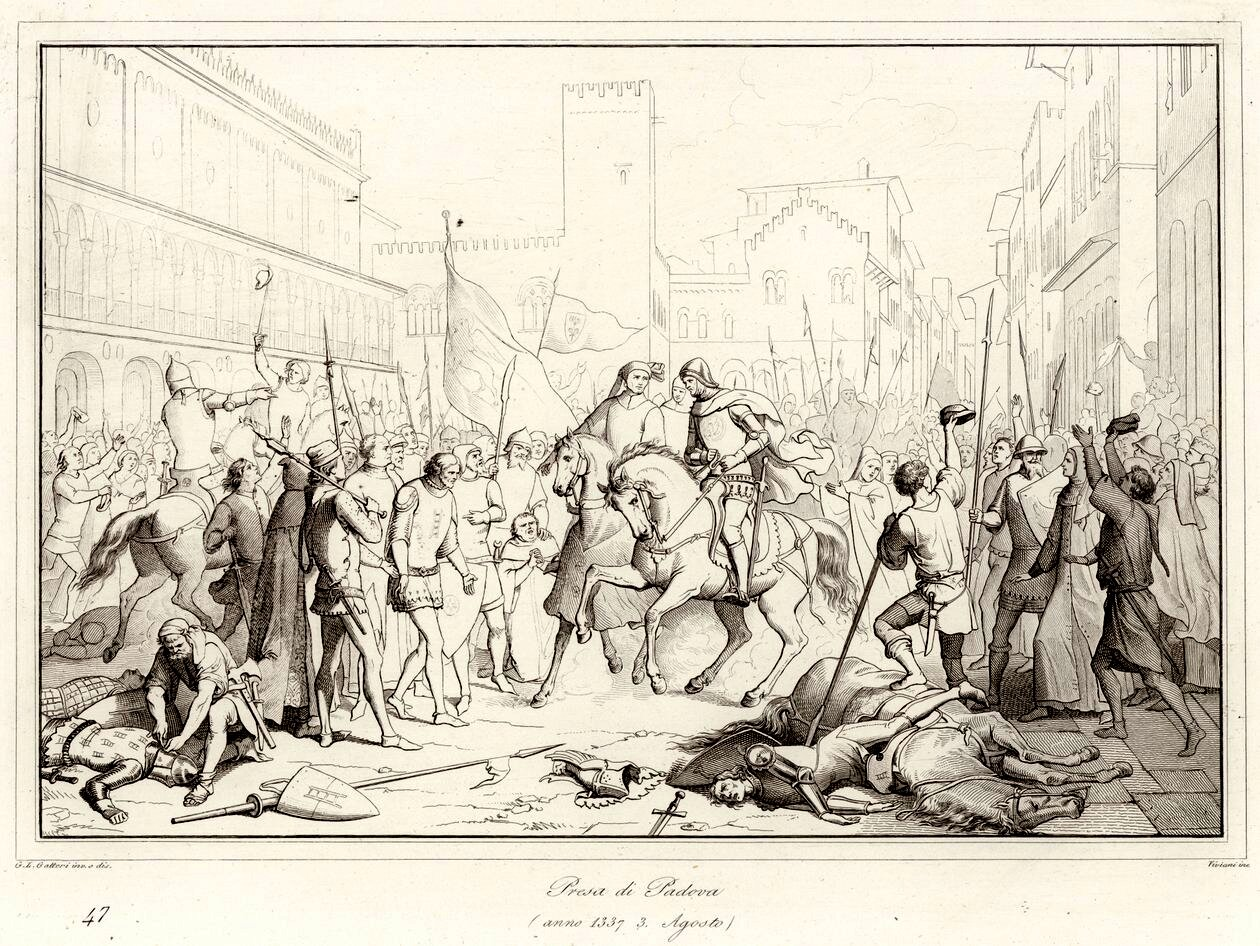
- The capture of Padua and Alberto II della Scala by the allied army, by Giuseppe Lorenzo Gatteri
Date	22 June 1336 – 24 January 1339
Location	Veneto, Italy
Result	Scaliger defeat

Belligerents
Scaliger lordship of Verona	Republic of Venice; Republic of Florence; From 1337 also: Visconti lordship of Milan; Gonzaga lordship of Mantua; D'Este lordship of Ferrara and Modena; Carrara lordship of Padua; House of Luxembourg

Commanders and leaders
Mastino II della Scala; Alberto II della Scala (POW); Marsilio da Carrara	Pietro de' Rossi (DOW); Marsilio de' Rossi #; Rolando de' Rossi; Luchino Visconti; Azzo Visconti; Ludovico I Gonzaga; Marsilio da Carrara; Ubertino I da Carrara; Charles of Luxembourg

The Scaliger War was a conflict fought in 1336–1339 between the Scaliger lords of Verona, Mastino II della Scala and Alberto II della Scala, who had built an extensive territorial state in northern Italy, and a coalition of powers threatened by Scaliger expansion. These were chiefly the Republic of Venice, antagonized by the imposition of taxes on overland trade and the Scaligers' threat to end Venetian salt monopoly, and the Republic of Florence, which resented the Scaliger annexation of Lucca, that Florence had claimed for itself. After the first victories of the anti-Scaliger coalition, it was joined by Milan, Mantua, and Ferrara, who all had reasons to fear Scaliger ambitions. The turning point of the war was the end of Scaliger dominion over Padua in 1337, which became a separate, Venetian-influenced lordship under Marsilio da Carrara. The peace treaty, concluded at Venice on 24 January 1339, deprived Mastino II of most of his recent gains, reducing Scaliger domains to Verona and Vicenza, as well as Lucca and Parma, which were soon lost. The annexation of Mestre and Treviso to Venice marked the beginnings of the Venetian mainland state.

== Background ==
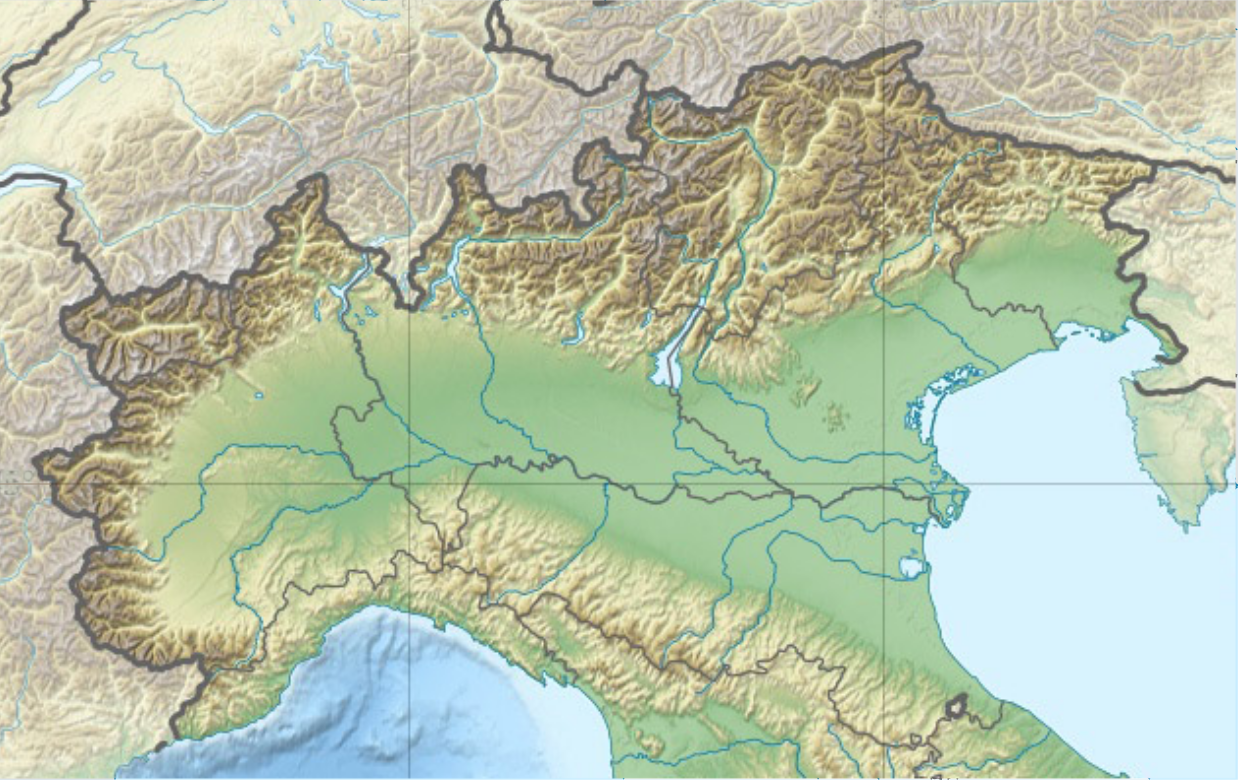
Main cities and sites of the conflict

In the second half of the 13th century, the Scaliger family had seized control of Verona and converted it from a commune into a hereditary lordship. During the reign of Alboino I (1301–1311) and his brother Cangrande I (1308–1329), the Scaligers entered into an alliance with the Holy Roman Emperor Henry VII, supporting the pro-Imperial and anti-Papal Ghibelline faction in northern Italy; in exchange, in March 1311 the Scaligers were named Imperial vicars of Verona and its territory, lending their rule Imperial legitimacy. At the same time, Veronese troops helped the Imperials capture Vicenza, which until then had belonged to Padua, one of the chief cities of the pro-Papal and anti-Imperial Guelph faction. The following years were marked by Cangrande's ambition to capture Padua as well.

This began a long period of fighting, broken by short-lived armistices, between Padua and Verona, each in turn seeking regional allies. The Republic of Venice, Emperor Louis the Bavarian and the Habsburg Dukes of Austria intervened at different times in the conflict. For a while, Padua voluntarily submitted to the rule of German vicars appointed by the Habsburgs to protect the city from being captured by the Scaligers, while among Cangrande's staunchest confederates were the Ghibellines exiled from Padua. Taking advantage of internal rivalries in these cities, Cangrande seized Feltre in June 1321 and Belluno in October 1322. After ten years of conflict, Padua's resistance also began to falter: riven by civil strife, growing resentful of the German mercenaries in their midst, and hard-pressed in the field, the city held out until September 1328, when Marsilio da Carrara, newly elected as lord of Padua, submitted to Cangrande and agreed to rule on his behalf, cemented by a marriage alliance between Cangrande's nephew, Mastino II, and Taddea da Carrara, daughter of Jacopo I da Carrara, who had ruled as Lord of Padua in 1318–1320. In July 1329, Cangrande added Treviso to his domains, but died there five days later.

Cangrande was succeeded by his nephews, the sons of Alboino: Mastino II and Alberto II, although the latter was clearly overshadowed by Mastino in authority. In August 1329, Alberto moved his residence to Padua, and built his own palace in the city. Marsilio da Carrara was dismissed from office, and instead demoted to serving the growing Scaliger territorial state as a soldier and administrator. Mastino continued Cangrande's policy of expansion: despite the opposition of Henry VII's son, John of Bohemia, in 1332, the Scaligers captured Brescia, followed in 1335 by Reggio Emilia, Parma, and Lucca. The Scaliger domains thus reached their greatest extent, with some modern historians arguing that the Scaligers' ultimate aim was the creation of a supra-regional state with common institutions, while others cite the continued autonomy of individual cities, as well as the diverging interests and initiatives of local Scaliger lieutenants, as evidence arguing against a centralizing project of this kind.

== Friction with Venice ==
Scaliger expansion had until then been tolerated by the Republic of Venice; as late as 1329, the Republic had awarded Venetian citizenship to Cangrande and his successors, and relations appear to have been amicable during the first half of the 1330s. A first point of friction was the demand in 1332 that Venetian citizens and monasteries should pay taxes for their possessions in Scaliger territories. This was followed in 1335 by the installation of a chain across the Po River at Ostiglia that enforced taxes on river traffic. This caused concern in Venice, as Venice was dependent on free commerce through the Po valley, and reliant on the import of grain from the mainland territories under Scaliger control. Traditional historiography, influenced by the pro-Venetian point of view of the main source for the conflict, the chronicle of Jacopo Piacentino, expresses the view that these events represented deliberate Scaliger provocations. Correspondingly, the traditional thesis is that Venice was dragged into a land war unwillingly, this sort of conflict being foreign to the maritime-minded republic with its traditional reluctance to get involved in mainland Italian affairs. Modern historians acknowledge the reluctance of the Venetian patriciate to engage in an open conflict; not least Doge Francesco Dandolo is recorded to have been fiercely opposed to the war. Nevertheless they also affirm that the road to it was actively shaped by Venetian initiatives, at least after 1335, when the Scaliger annexation of Parma and Brescello put control of the Po basin in their hands and threatened to constrain the hitherto unfettered Venetian access to it.

In September 1335, Venice sent a first embassy to Verona to lodge complaints about the new Scaliger measures, but the Scaligers did not respond until January 1336. At that time, the Republic sent an ultimatum demanding the reversal of these measures, but without success. In March Venice sent a final embassy to the Scaliger lords; to back up the embassy with actions, the Venetian Senate halted the export of salt from the salt pans of the Venetian Lagoon to Scaliger territories, soon extended to a full embargo of foodstuffs. Negotiations in April 1336, mediated by Marsilio da Carrara and the lord of Milan, Azzo Visconti, came close to resolving the issue, as the Scaligers agreed to remove the barrier at Ostiglia and Venice to restore the salt supply; but suddenly Venice hardened its position, and on 14 May 1336, the Venetian Senate reaffirmed its demands, seeking full victory. In response, the Scaligers began creating salt works of their own at Petadebò near Chioggia, where the Paduans had already attempted it in 1304, leading to a brief conflict with Venice. The works protected by troops and a newly constructed castle, the Castello delle Saline (lit. 'Castle of the Saltworks'). At the same time the Republic of Florence, which had coveted Lucca for itself, also began moving against Scaliger interests, by persuading its fellow Guelph city, Bologna, to block the passage of Scaliger or allied troops through Bolognese territory on their way between the Scaliger possessions in Tuscany and the Veneto.

== War ==
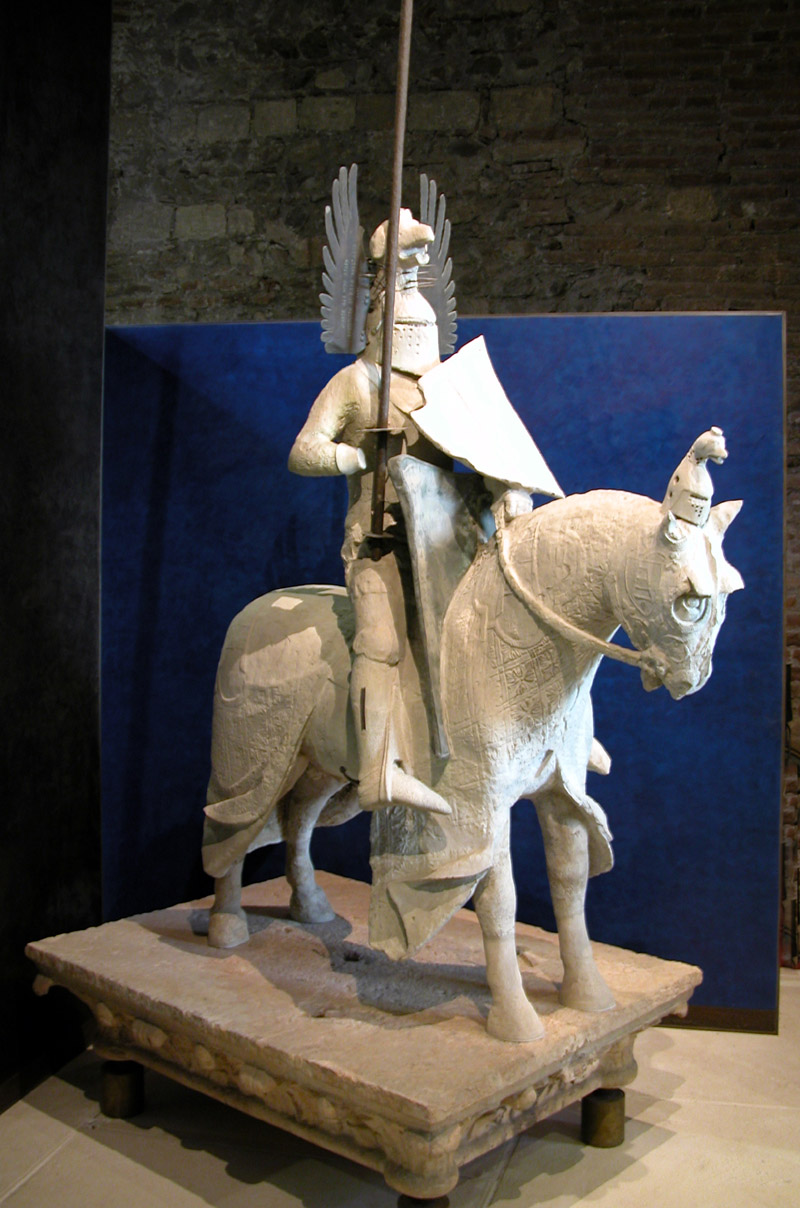
Statue of Mastino II della Scala as a knight, from the Scaliger Tombs at Verona

=== 1336: Allied offensive across the Piave ===
On 22 June 1336, Venice and Florence concluded an alliance against the Scaligers, with Florence undertaking to provide for two thirds of the costs of the war. Venice began preparing for war by instituting a board of 25 patricians authorized to conduct the conflict and supervise the recruitment of an army. A militia force of Venetian citizens of military age (between 20 and 60 years old) was called up from each of Venice's six districts. Contingents of approximately 1,250 men served in turn for terms of fifteen days in local defence duties in Venice and its Lagoon, particularly opposite the Scaliger saltworks and the new Castello di Saline.

Unlike Venice, Florence had extensive experience with contracting and maintaining large mercenary armies. German and Italian mercenaries were recruited, along with cavalry contingents from Florence, Bologna and Ferrara, as well as numerous Venetian citizens who were conscripted or volunteered to serve, swept up by a wave of popular enthusiasm for the war. By September, the allied field army at Motta numbered 4,200 knights and 3,000 infantry; in addition to their pay, the mercenaries were promised any booty they could take, while land and prisoners were to be handed over to the Venetian officials. Command of the joint forces was given to the condottiero Pietro de' Rossi, who had personal reasons to fight against the Scaligers: he and his family had been deprived of their lordship over Parma by Mastino II and his Parmesan allies, the Da Correggio family. The latter became the Scaliger governors, and soon confiscated most of the Rossi estates. Pietro's brothers Rolando and Marsilio secretly left for Venice in early spring, where Marsilio assumed temporary command of the Motta camp while Pietro first took up service with Florence in May before making for Venice, where he arrived in August or September to take up the high command. A council of four, two Venetians and two Florentines, was instituted to advise and assist the alliance's captain-general.

Hostilities began in July, when the allied army captured Oderzo, only to promptly lose it to a Scaliger counterattack. On 23 October Pietro de' Rossi led his forces across the Piave River into the environs of Treviso, divided into three parts: a vanguard of 1,000 infantry and 1,000 cavalry under Marsilio, a rearguard of 400 cavalry and 300 infantry under Golfard Steinberg, and the main army under Pietro himself. Mastino and Alberto opted to avoid a—potentially disastrous—direct confrontation with the allied army, instead engaging in a scorched earth policy. This allowed Pietro de' Rossi to cross the Brenta River unopposed, and advance to Piove di Sacco and thence to Bovolenta, just 12 kilometres (7.5 mi) south of Padua, where the allies set up camp. From there, a detachment was sent to attack the Castello di Saline, which was captured on 22 November and razed to the ground. The allies spent the remainder of the winter pillaging the environs of Padua. The only clash occurred on 26 December, when a force of Veronese knights was defeated at Este; over 150 knights and 26 officers were taken prisoner.

=== 1337: The defection of Padua ===
In the early months of 1337, Pietro de' Rossi continued his raids into Scaliger territory, partly in order to provision his own army. The town of Curtarolo and the fortress of Treville were captured from the Scaliger lieutenant Guglielmo Camposampiero and garrisoned. At the same time, the rulers of Lombardy, Azzo Visconti of Milan, Ludovico I Gonzaga of Mantua, and Obizzo III d'Este of Ferrara and his brother Niccolò II d'Este of Modena, sent an embassy to Venice to mediate for an end to the conflict. Mastino had held talks with Azzo Visconti at Cremona for this purpose, but once at Venice, the ambassadors agreed to join the Venetian–Florentine league against the Scaligers instead. The conclusion of this alliance on 10 March 1337 was followed on 28 July by the adherence to the anti-Scaliger coalition of John of Bohemia's son (and future Holy Roman Emperor) Charles of Luxembourg, and his brother, John, Count of Tyrol. The Scaligers' diplomatic isolation was complete, their enemies now clearly aiming at the destruction of the Scaliger state. These developments also gave the signal for a revolt of several towns in the Treviso area—Camposampiero, Conegliano, Asolo, San Zenone, Cittadella—which were captured by the allies, followed by a siege of Treviso itself.

At the same time, a Lombard army under Luchino Visconti took to the field in the west, threatening Verona itself. Mastino was forced to withdraw most of his forces to the defence of his capital. In June, Mastino confronted the joined allied army, under Luchino Visconti and Marsilio de' Rossi, south of Verona. In view of the Scaliger numerical superiority, Visconti withdrew and abandoned Marsilio de' Rossi with a much smaller force. Mastino failed to press his advantage, allowing his opponents to withdraw under cover of night. Mastino was apparently also able to bribe the enemy commanders, having exacted forcible loans from the citizens of Verona and Vicenza. Mastino then led his forces east to raise the siege of Treviso. Instead of a direct action, however, he hoped to achieve this by threatening the besiegers' supplies, which came from Venice via Pontelongo. The Scaliger lord captured several ships laden with supplies, but again declined a pitched battle with his opponents when they arrived on the scene, and withdrew towards Verona.

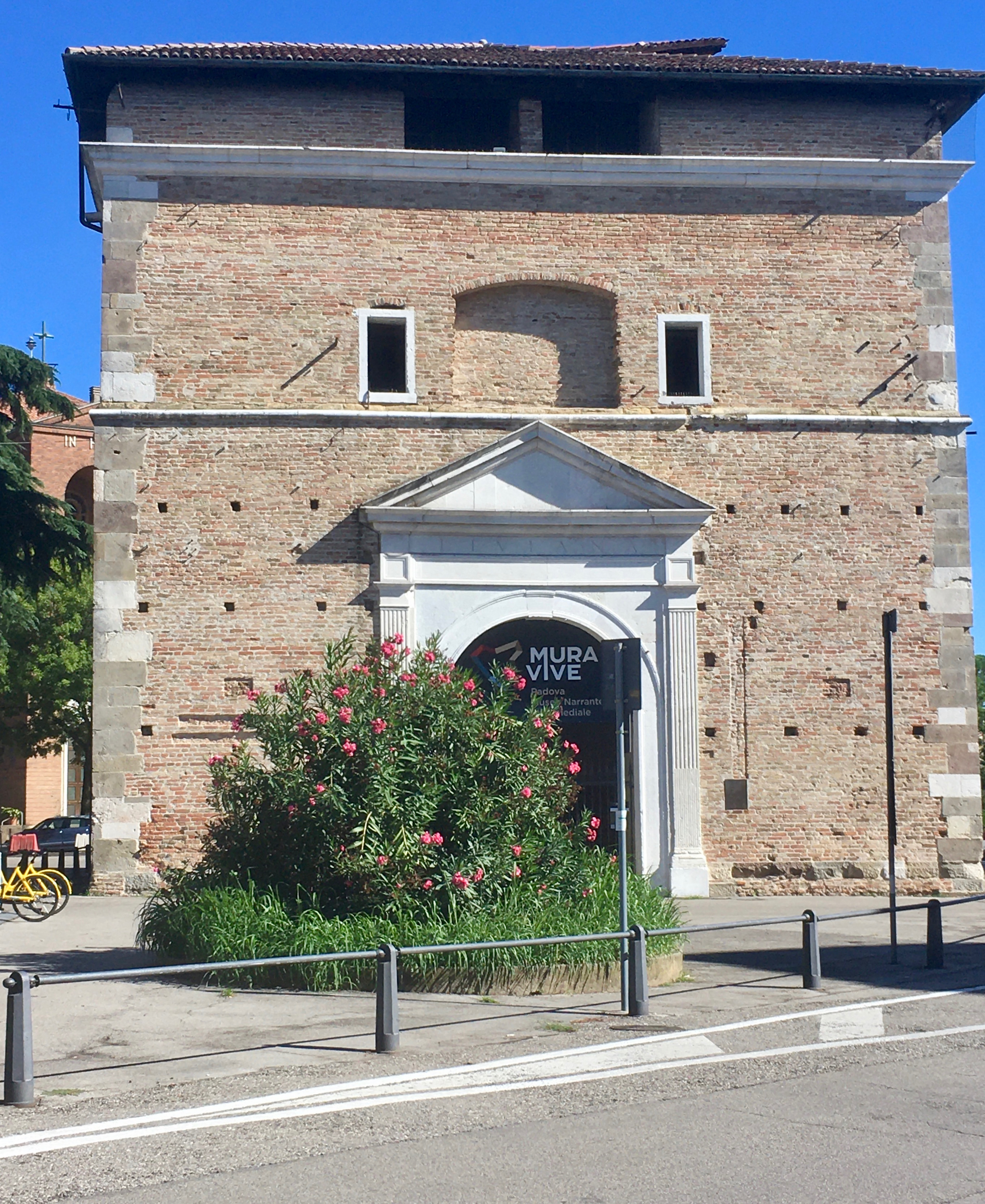
The Ponte Corvo gate (shown here after its 16th-century reconstruction), through which the allied troops entered Padua

Mastino's concentration of his forces at Verona had left his brother Alberto exposed at Padua with only 500 German knights and some local levies. Alberto's men were not sufficient to even man the walls of the city, forcing him to rely on Marsilio da Carrara and Marsilio's cousin, Ubertino, who provided a source of local support and money. The strategic importance of Padua made the support of the Carrara crucial, a fact recognized by both sides in the war. Already on 30 April 1336 Venice had sent envoys to Marsilio to reassure him of the Republic's good will towards him, while the choice of Pietro de' Rossi as commander-in-chief may have been influenced by the fact that his mother was Marsilio's favourite aunt. Conversely, the Scaligers had tried to bribe Marsilio with favourable trade deals and the grant of tithes in the Treviso region. By mid-1337 the Scaliger reversals, coupled with the financial exactions by Alberto and the latter's open disdain for the Carrara—not least the open and repeated seduction by Alberto of Ubertino da Carrara's wife—had turned the Carrara hostile. Unaware of this, Alberto sent Marsilio da Carrara as envoy to Venice in hopes of ending the war. Instead, Marsilio on 14 July 1337 concluded an agreement with the Republic, whereby he would assist Venice and Florence, and be recognized in turn as the lord of Padua by his new allies. In exchange for Venetian and Florentine protection, Marsilio agreed to drop all taxes and dues for Venetian and Florentine goods passing his territory, as well as reverse the Scaliger measures that had led to the war.

Pietro de' Rossi moved his army in the direction of Padua on 24 July, establishing contact with Marsilio da Carrara and his followers in the city. On 3 August, the allied army launched a diversionary attack on the Santa Croce gate of the city walls. While the German garrison rushed to defend it, Carrara partisans opened the Ponte Corvo gate to the main body of the allied army. The capture of Padua proceeded swiftly and almost without bloodshed: Alberto della Scala was taken by surprise in his palace and brought prisoner to Venice, while the allies secured the surrender of the German garrison on the promise that they would be allowed safe passage to their homelands through Venetian territories. The end of Scaliger rule was enthusiastically welcomed by the Paduans, and on 6 August 1337, Marsilio da Carrara was elected by the Paduan Great Council as lord of the city.

The fall of Padua is generally recognized as the decisive turning point of the war, but for the moment Mastino refused to enter into negotiations, and the conflict continued. From Padua, Marsilio da Carrara sent Pietro de' Rossi, Ubertino da Carrara, and Marsilietto Papafava (from a cadet branch of the Carrara family) with an army of German mercenaries to capture the fortress of Monselice. Located south of Padua, Monselice had been among the first Paduan strongholds to fall into Scaliger hands in 1317, and had been a base of operations for Cangrande in his wars against Padua in the following years. On 8 August, while leading an attack on Monselice, Pietro de' Rossi was mortally wounded, followed a week later by his brother Marsilio, who succumbed to an illness. Command fell to the sole surviving Rossi brother, Rolando, who shared few of his brothers' military talents, but continued the siege of Monselice. Elsewhere the Scaliger position began to crumble: in August Charles of Luxembourg seized Feltre, in September Mestre was handed over to the Venetians by the garrison commandants in exchange for money, while Brescia rebelled against Scaliger rule and was occupied on 8 October by the forces of Azzo Visconti and Ludovico Gonzaga.

Faced with this situation, in October Mastino sent envoys to Venice, proposing peace in exchange for ceding Lucca to Florence for 80,000 florins and Treviso to Venice. By December, the Veronese terms included ceding Monselice and Bassano, on condition that they were to come under Venetian rule and not handed over to Padua as stipulated in the treaty with Marsilio da Carrara. Negotiations began in earnest with the arrival in Venice of envoys from the Visconti and d'Este lords, but as the Veronese negotiators insisted on unacceptable conditions, on 22 December the talks were broken off.

=== 1338: Surrender of Monselice ===
At the same time, Mastino tried to secure aid from Emperor Louis, in exchange for ceding his domains at Peschiera del Garda as well as critical Alpine passes in South Tyrol. Mastino even sent Louis his own son, Cangrande II and several Veronese nobles as hostages. Louis' ambassadors came to Venice in February requesting a one-month truce on Mastino's behalf, but the Venetians refused and Louis failed to provide any further assistance. Mastino had more success with wooing away Ludovico I Gonzaga from the anti-Scaliger league, concluding a secret agreement with him in February. On the meantime, the allied army under Rolando de' Rossi and Guecello Tempesta continued its raids into Scaliger territory, reaching up to Vicenza and capturing several Veronese soldiers in the process.

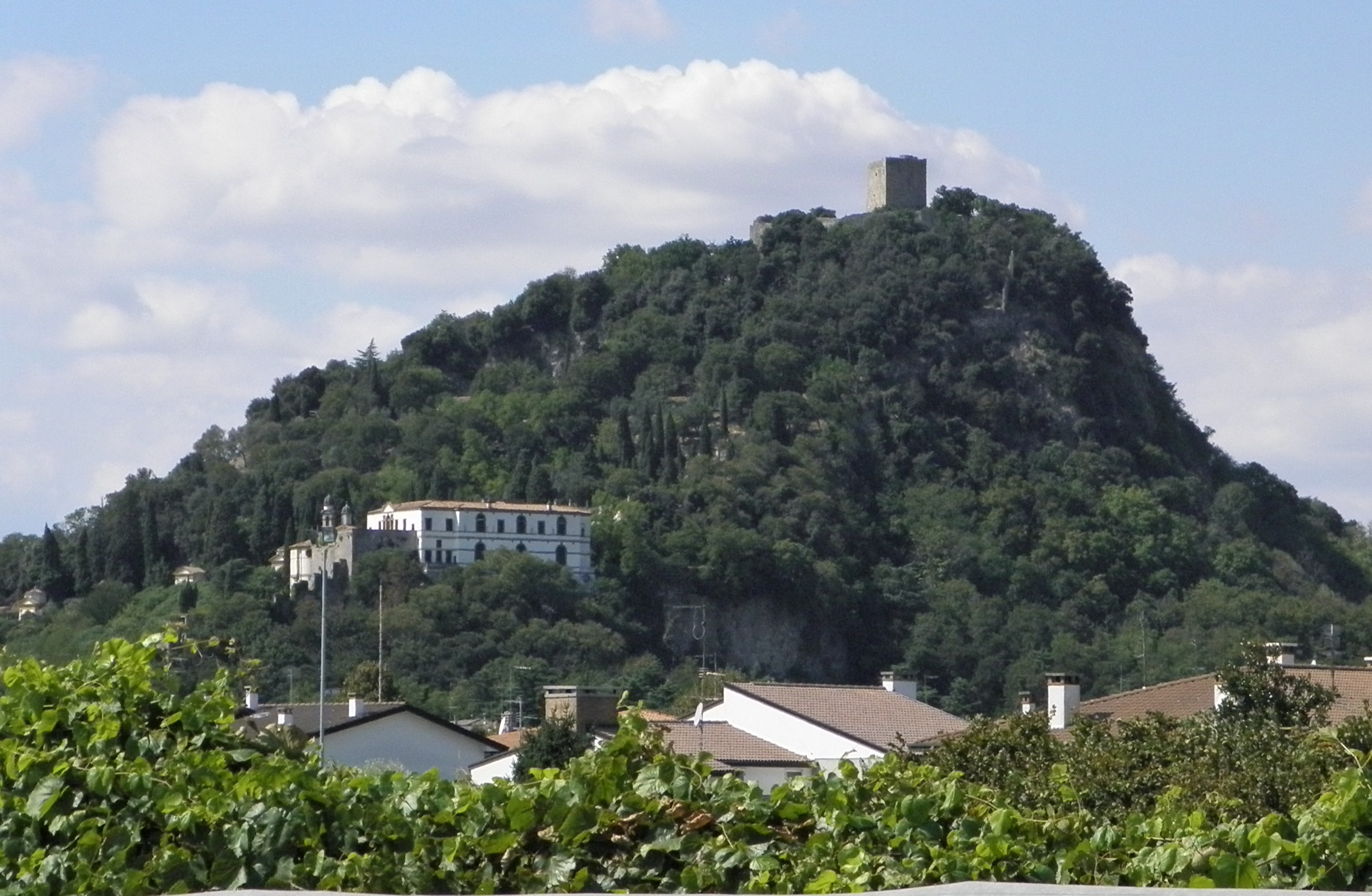
The Rocca castle at Monselice

Marsilio da Carrara died on 27 March, and was succeeded by Ubertino, who promptly reconfirmed the 1337 agreement with Venice and Florence, adding further trade privileges as well as a mutual assistance clause for the two protector powers. Ubertino took over the siege of Monselice and had eight Veronese soldiers, who were captured while trying to enter Monselice, executed. In return, the Scaliger commandant executed seven citizens suspected of treason, and Ubertino executed further thirteen prisoners of war, and slit the noses of local women captured while trying to steal food from the besiegers' camp. In April, an allied army under Rossi and the Paduan commander Tartaro da Lendinara advanced up to Verona, where they held a tournament in full view of the city walls to taunt the defenders. When a group of enraged Veronese knights launched a sally to disrupt the event, it was beaten back. Mastino gathered a large army, 2,000 cavalry and 6,000 infantry, and in May set out to recapture Montecchio—recently captured by Rossi along with Arzignano—and relieve Monselice. Mastino's offensive ended in disaster: his army was defeated by Rossi and a small number of German knights at Montecchio, and his later attempt to capture the fortress of Longare was repulsed, with several of his troops losing their lives in the Bacchiglione river during the retreat.

The allies also faced troubles, as in the aftermath of the victory at Montecchio their German mercenaries went on strike, demanding the bonus payment of a double salary. The Venetians tried to calm the mercenaries by offering a future payment, as well as placing a reward of 10,000 pounds on Mastino della Scala, but to no avail. In the end, the allies turned to Louis the Bavarian to adjudicate the dispute. The Emperor found in favour of the mercenaries, but this in turn caused trouble with Florence, which as a Guelph city aligned with the Papacy refused to acknowledge the authority of the excommunicated Louis. The allies nevertheless resolved to launch a new offensive against the Scaliger possessions: Ubertino da Carrara agreed to offer 8,000 ducats to the Scaliger mercenaries would agreed to surrender the forts they garrisoned. At Monselice, the allies proposed to give the entire garrison safe conduct to Verona. This was guaranteed by the use of hostages from both the garrison and the Carrara forces in Venice, and on 19 August 1338, the Scaliger troops departed Monselice apart from the citadel of the Rocca, which surrendered in November. In September, the Scaliger commanders Spinetta Malaspina and da Fogliano attempted to reconquer Montagnana but were beaten back. After these defeats, discontent spread even in the Scaliger heartlands: on 27 August, Mastino executed his cousin, the bishop of Verona Bartolomeo, allegedly because he conspired with the Venetians; and in October, Mastino had to move restive nobles from Vicenza to Verona to ensure their loyalty.

=== Treaty of San Marco ===
Negotiations between the Scaligers and allies began anew in October, through the mediation of Ludovico I Gonzaga. The conflict continued during this time, allowing the Venetians to capture Treviso in December. The peace treaty was ratified at Saint Mark's Basilica in Venice on 24 January 1339, and stripped the Scaligers of most of their recent gains: Venice retained Treviso, the Carrara lordship over Padua was confirmed with the addition of Bassano and Castelbaldo, and Florence received the towns of Buggiano, Pescia, Altopascio, and Colle, though not of Lucca, which remained in Scaliger hands. The treaty was a particular triumph for Venice: the restrictions to and taxation of commerce on the Po were lifted, clauses regulated the property rights of Venetian citizens in Veronese territory and vice versa, and an indemnity of 10,000 ducats was to be paid for damages to Venetian property, to be assessed by Venetian officials. As Venice had no interest to weaken the Scaliger state too much for the benefit of other ambitious potentates, most notably the Visconti, they were allowed to retain Vicenza. The allies of both parties agreed to the treaty thus ending the war, although in Florence the exclusion of Lucca caused resentment towards Venice.

== Aftermath ==
Despite their losses, the Scaligers still retained a significant state, encompassing Verona, Vicenza, Parma and Lucca, although the latter two were left as isolated exclaves. This allowed Mastino to resume an aggressive foreign policy, trying to capture Bologna and Mantua. These conflicts led to a new anti-Scaliger league led by the Viscontis and Gonzagas, the loss of Parma (May 1341) and the sale of Lucca, now left even more isolated, to Florence (June 1341). Nevertheless, until his death in 1351, Mastino remained engaged in fruitless military adventures, which led to the definitive exhaustion of the Scaliger state. Scaliger rule in Verona and Vicenza lasted until 1387, when Antonio I was overthrown in favour of the energetic ruler of Milan, Gian Galeazzo Visconti, another ruler who aimed to unite much of northern Italy into a territorial state.

Padua emerged from the conflict as a separate lordship under Carrara rule. The Florentine protectorate was soon allowed to lapse, but Venetian overlordship became all the stronger; the Venetians referred to Padua as status noster, "our state". Gradually, the Carrara lords moved away from Venetian tutelage and eventually became determined rivals of Venice, fighting against her in a border war in 1372–1373 and playing a major role in the anti-Venetian coalition during the War of Chioggia (1378–1381), which almost destroyed the Republic. The Carrara then engaged in an expansionist policy in the Veneto that culminated, in 1404, in the conquest of Verona and the siege of Vicenza. This brought them to a final, and fatal, confrontation with Venice in the War of Padua, which ended in November 1405 with the defeat and execution of the Carrara and the annexation of Padua, Verona, Vicenza, and much of the Veneto besides into the Republic.

For Venice, the war solved their security problems, by acquiring Treviso for themselves and a protectorate over Padua, providing a strategic buffer for the Dogado. It helped improve public finances, and was the first step in Venice's progressively increasing involvement in mainland Italian affairs. At the same time, it was the first real, full-scale war the Republic had to fight, and was a watershed in its military organization: large-scale conscription of Venetian citizens was practiced for the first time, contingents of Italian allies had to be integrated, and a large mercenary army had to be recruited, organized, and kept paid and supplied, leading to the first such set of regulations issued in 1336. The annexation of Treviso gave Venice its first major mainland possession, in stark contrast to traditional Venetian policy. It thus marked the start of what would, after the War of Padua, become the mainland state ("Terraferma") of the Republic, a second, more compact, and more profitable possession next to the Republic's existing overseas colonial empire.

Florence, on the other hand had less to show for its participation in the conflict. The Florentines made strenuous financial efforts: some 600,000 florins, or twice the total revenue of the Republic, were spent on the war, involving heavy internal borrowing. With tax revenue falling, and coupled with the expenditure of another 250,000 florins in 1341 to purchase Lucca from Mastino, the outbreak of a war with Pisa, and the default of King Edward III of England's extensive Florentine loans, a political crisis engulfed Florence, leading to the establishment of a brief autocratic rule over the city by Walter of Brienne. During the later 14th century, Florence also began to build a territorial state encompassing most of Tuscany, which brought it into near fatal conflict with Gian Galeazzo Visconti. After the latter's sudden death in 1402, Florence recovered, and definitively conquered her old rival, Pisa, in 1406, establishing itself as a major regional power.

== Sources ==
- Gamberini, Andrea (2000). "GIAN GALEAZZO Visconti, duca di Milano". Dizionario Biografico degli Italiani (in Italian). Vol. 54: Ghiselli–Gimma. Rome: Istituto dell'Enciclopedia Italiana. ISBN 978-88-12-00032-6.
- Kohl, Benjamin G. (1998). Padua under the Carrara, 1318–1405. Baltimore and London: Johns Hopkins University Press. ISBN 0-8018-5703-1.
- Mallett, M. E.; Hale, J. R. (1984). The Military Organization of a Renaissance State: Venice c. 1400 to 1617. Cambridge: Cambridge University Press. ISBN 0-521-03247-4.
- Mennini Ippolito, Antonio (1986). "Della Scala". Lexikon des Mittelalters, III: Codex Wintoniensis bis Erziehungs- und Bildungswesen (in German). Stuttgart and Weimar: J. B. Metzler. col. 676–678. ISBN 3-7608-8903-4.
- Mennini Ippolito, Antonio (1986). "Della Scala, Cangrande I.". Lexikon des Mittelalters, III: Codex Wintoniensis bis Erziehungs- und Bildungswesen (in German). Stuttgart and Weimar: J. B. Metzler. col. 678–679. ISBN 3-7608-8903-4.
- Mennini Ippolito, Antonio (1986). "Della Scala, Mastino II.". Lexikon des Mittelalters, III: Codex Wintoniensis bis Erziehungs- und Bildungswesen (in German). Stuttgart and Weimar: J. B. Metzler. col. 681. ISBN 3-7608-8903-4.
- Najemy, John M. (2006). A History of Florence 1200–1575. Oxford: Blackwell Publishing. ISBN 978-1-4051-1954-2.
- Pellegrini, Marco (2022). Venezia e la Terraferma (in Italian). Bologna: Il Mulino. ISBN 978-88-15-29541-5.
- Ravegnani, Giorgio (2017). Il traditore di Venezia: Vita di Marino Falier doge (in Italian). Bari and Rome: Editori Laterza. ISBN 978-88-581-2715-5.
- Varanini, Gian Maria (1989). "DELLA SCALA, Cangrande". Dizionario Biografico degli Italiani (in Italian). Vol. 37: Della Fratta–Della Volpaia. Rome: Istituto dell'Enciclopedia Italiana. ISBN 978-88-12-00032-6.
- Varanini, Gian Maria (1989). "DELLA SCALA, Mastino". Dizionario Biografico degli Italiani (in Italian). Vol. 37: Della Fratta–Della Volpaia. Rome: Istituto dell'Enciclopedia Italiana. ISBN 978-88-12-00032-6.
- Varanini, Gian Maria (1997). "Venezia e l'entroterra (1300 circa - 1420)". Storia di Venezia dalle origini alla caduta della Serenissima. Vol. III, La formazione dello stato patrizio (in Italian). Rome: Istituto della Enciclopedia Italiana. pp. 159–236.
- Zug Tucci, Hannelore (1997). "Le milizie terrestri". Storia di Venezia dalle origini alla caduta della Serenissima. Vol. III, La formazione dello stato patrizio (in Italian). Rome: Istituto della Enciclopedia Italiana. pp. 251–296.
