= Jacopo da Carrara =

Jacopo or Giacomo da Carrara may refer to:

- Jacopino da Carrara
- Jacopo I da Carrara, (died 1324), called the Great, founder Carraresi dynasty that ruled Padua from 1318 to 1405
- Jacopo II da Carrara, (died 1350), of the Carraresi family, was the capitano del popolo of Padua from 1345 until his death

See also

Carraresi family
