= Lords of Padua =

The Lords of Padua ruled the city from 1308 until 1405. The commune of Padua became a hereditary one-man lordship (signoria) with the election of Jacopo I da Carrara as capitano del popolo in 1308. His descendants, the Carraresi, ruled the city and its vicinity, with short interruptions, until they were defeated by the Republic of Venice in the War of Padua, which resulted in the annexation of the city by Venice.

| Signore | Rule | | Notes(s) |
|---|---|---|---|
| Jacopo I 'the Great' da Carrara | 25 July 1318 | 22/23 November 1324 | De jure abdicated in November 1319 in favour of imperial vicars, de facto remained in control of the city until his death. |
| Marsilio da Carrara | 22/23 November 1324 | 21 March 1338 | Nephew of Jacopo I. Between 1328 and 1337 formally as vicar of Cangrande I della Scala, Lord of Verona. |
| Ubertino I da Carrara | 21 March 1338 | 27 March 1345 | Cousin of Marsilio. |
| Marsilietto Papafava da Carrara | 27 March 1345 | 6 May 1345 | Distant relative of Ubertino, from the Papafava branch of the Carrara family. Assassinated by Jacopo II. |
| Jacopo II da Carrara | 6 May 1345 | 19 December 1350 | Nephew of Ubertino I. Assassinated by Guglielmo da Carrara, illegitimate son of Jacopo I. |
| Jacopino da Carrara | 19 December 1350 | 1355 | Brother of Jacopo II. Co-ruler with his nephew, Francesco I da Carrara |
| Francesco I 'il Vecchio' da Carrara | 19 December 1350 | 29 June 1388 | Son of Jacopo II. Co-ruler with his uncle, Jacopino da Carrara, until 1355. Forced to abdicate by Gian Galeazzo Visconti, ruler of Milan. |
| Francesco II 'il Novello' da Carrara | 29 June 1388 | 11 February 1389 | Son of Francesco I. Lost rule of Padua to the Visconti troops, but recovered the city in 1390 and ruled it until defeated by the Republic of Venice in 1405. |
| Gian Galeazzo Visconti | 11 February 1389 | 8 September 1390 | Duke of Milan. |
| Francesco II 'il Novello' da Carrara | 8 September 1390 | 22 November 1405 | Son of Francesco I. Lost rule of Padua to the Visconti troops, but recovered the city in 1390 and ruled it until was defeated by the Republic of Venice in 1405. He and his sons were executed in early 1406, thus ending the Carrara line. |

== See also ==
- Timeline of Padua

== Sources ==
- Kohl, Benjamin G. (1998). Padua under the Carrara, 1318–1405. Baltimore and London: Johns Hopkins University Press. ISBN 0-8018-5703-1.
