= Alberto della Scala =

Alberto della Scala may refer to:

- Alberto I della Scala (died 1301)
- Alberto II della Scala (1306–1352)
