= Ubertino I da Carrara =

Lord of Padua (died 1345)

Ubertino I (or II) da Carrara (also Uberto, Umberto or Umbertino; died 29 March 1345), called Novello and better known as Ubertinello, was the Lord of Padua from 1338 until his death.

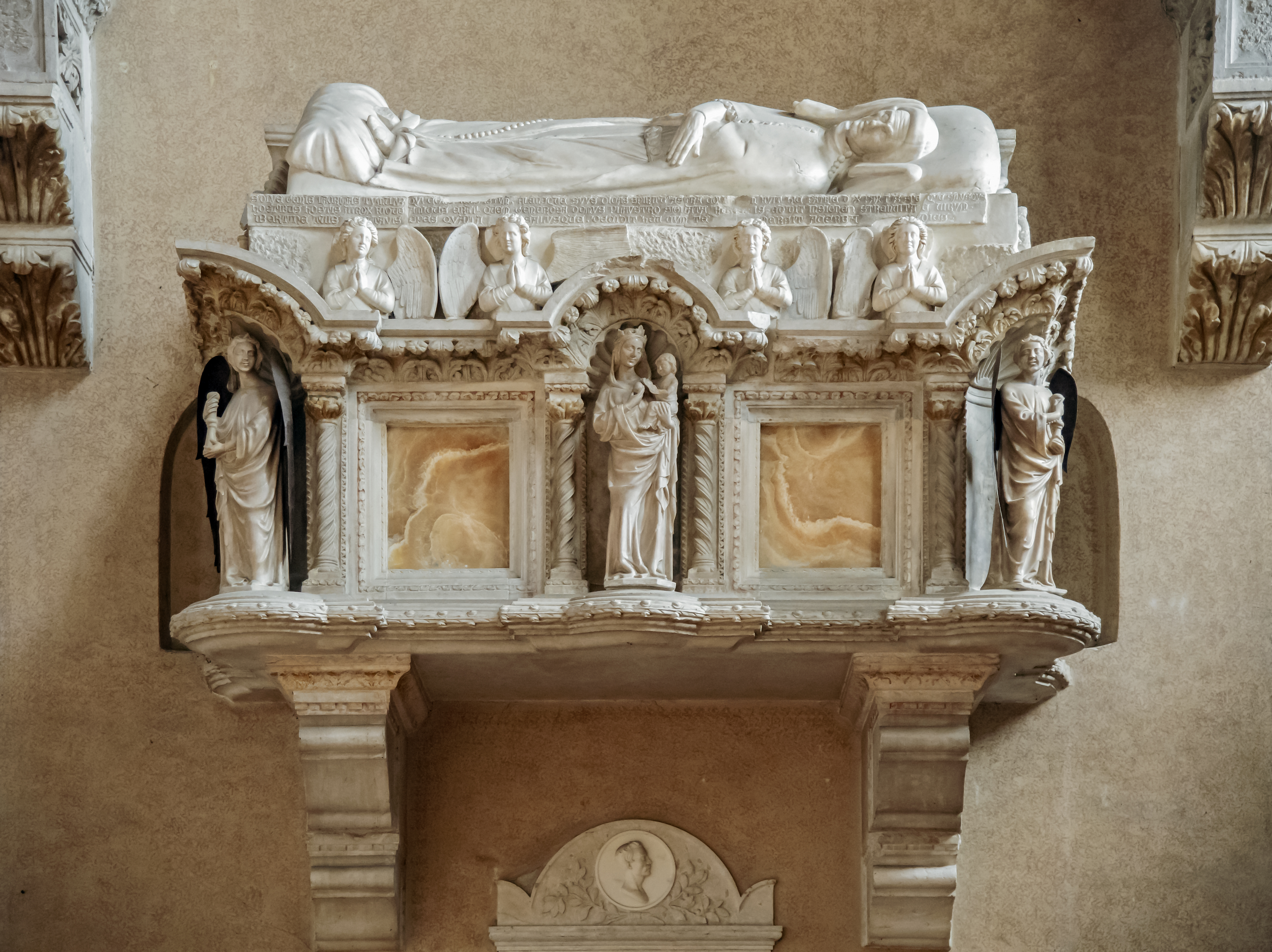
Tomb of Ubertino da Carrara

== Youth ==
Ubertinello was the son of Jacopino da Carrara of the Carraresi clan of Padua, where he was born early in the 14th century. His mother was Fina Fieschi. To distinguish him from his uncle Ubertino il Vecchio, he is usually known as either Ubertino Novello or Ubertinello.

In August 1319, Ubertinello, Albertino Mussato, and Giovanni di Vigonza were sent by Jacopino to seek help from Bologna when Cangrande I della Scala, with Rinaldo d'Este and Obizzo III of Ferrara, besieged Padua. They failed in their mission and, on 4 November, Jacopino offered the city to the protection of Henry of Görz, the vicar of Treviso for Frederick III of Germany.

== Quarrel with the Dente ==
On 17 July 1325, Ubertinello became involved in an extremely violent quarrel with horrible repercussions for Padua. Ubertinello murdered Guglielmo Dente and incurred banishment from the reigning podestà, Pollione Beccadelli. On 22 September, the deceased's brother, Paolo, with Gualpertino Mussato, the abbot of S. Giustina, and the podestà, attacked the Carraresi properties in the city. Ubertinello returned from Chioggia, where he was staying in exile, assassinated the podestà, and besieged his enemies in their homes. He invaded the chancery and burned all documents incriminating him and condemning him. Some of the city's archives were also lost. In the assassinated Beccadelli's place, Ubertinello installed Corradino Bocchi di Brescia. Conrad von Owenstein, the captain and vicar of Frederick III in Padua by appointment of Henry of Carinthia since 1321, banished the Dente and their supporters. Following this series of events, the Carraresi were again the chief family in Padua.

== Takeover in Padua ==
In September 1328, Ubertinello was involved with his uncle Marsilio in handing Padua over to Cangrande with a secret treaty. This was done to prevent their own relative Nicolò da Carrara from gaining too much power. Ubertinello was knighted at the subsequent celebrations in Verona.

On 14 July 1337, the secret treaty of nine years previous was overridden by a new secret pact, signed this time with the Republics of Venice and Florence. This new treaty made Marsilio lord of Padua and Ubertinello his heir. On 3 August, Alberto II della Scala, Cangrande's successor at Verona, was imprisoned by Venice, removing the chief obstacle to Marsilio's lordship. On 10 March 1338, Ubertinello became a Venetian citizen and on 22 March Marsilio died. On 5 May, in the Doge's Palace in Venice, with a Florentine embassy present, Ubertinello renewed the treaty of nine months earlier with only slight modifications. He was under obligation to come to the military aid of Venice and Florence against any of their enemies.

== Wars of aggrandisement ==
Ubertinello besieged Monselice for a year and a month until it fell on 19 August after his succession. The citadel held out until 28 November under Fiorello da Lucca. On 2 December, he obtained Treviso from Mastino II della Scala, Alberto's brother and co-ruler. By a treaty of 4 January 1339, however, he was forced to yield Treviso to Venice and accept Bassano and Castelbaldo instead. Verona, Lucca, Vicenza, and Parma were confirmed to the Scaligers.

On 9 April 1340, Ubertinello affirmed an alliance with Obizzo of Ferrara, Taddeo Pepoli, and Florence at Lendinara. This alliance was immediately opposed by an alliance of Luchino Visconti and Ludovico Gonzaga with Mastino. The war was sparked by envy for the rich cities of the Scaliger. Ubertinello sent Enghelmario di Villandres to take Vicenza, but Visconti scattered his army. The next year, Ubertinello broke the Scaliger alliances and bound himself with Visconti, Gonzaga, and Azzo da Corregio with the aim of taking Parma. In September, the allies raided Veronese territory as far as the gates of Vicenza, but the men of Mantua, loaded with booty, retired, leaving the remaining troops insufficient to take the city. Azzo began the siege of Parma on 21 May anyway.

Florence, meanwhile, had her eye on Lucca, longtime rival for the Tuscan primacy. She offered a huge sum of money to Mastino in return for the city, but the Republic of Pisa began besieging in the meantime. Florence turned to Ubertinello and, on the basis of the old treaty, demanded his military aid against Pisa. He refused, however. Florence paid 180,000 gold florins for the city, but Ubertinello sent troops instead to aid Pisa, allied with the Republic of Genoa, Gonzaga, Visconti, Corregio, and the other Ghibellines of Tuscany and Romagna. On 11 July 1342, Lucca fell to Pisa.

== Deterioration of relationship with Venice ==
On 24 March 1340, Venice settled a long-running succession dispute concerning Camposampiero. The castle was granted to Ubertinello, but the curia went to William, son of the late Tiso IX. In July that year, Vitaliano, son of William Dente, arrived in Venice only to have his dispossession and exile were reaffirmed.

In 1342, Candia revolted, but Venice refused to lend him aid.

A final effort at peace with Mastino was begun in 1343. On 25 May at Montagnana, Ubertinello agreed to wed his bastard daughter Gentile to Mastino's illegitimate son. The alliance was sealed. That very month, Lemizio, an illegitimate brother of William Dente, also arrived in Venice. He accused Ubertinello before the doge and launched a proceeding against him. Letters were sent summoning Ubertinello to appear before the tribunal within eight days. He was convicted and exiled (from Venice). His alliance with Mastino had made him a Venetian liability.

== Domestic initiatives ==
During his five years of power, Ubertinello had worked extensively to improve Padua internally. He began with reform legislation in February 1339.

He finished a new wall begun by Marsilio and built a new palace (1343). In March 1344, a clock was added to the tower of the palace by Giacomo Dondi. He repaved old roads and laid new ones. He reinforced the riverbanks to prevent flooding and erosion and dug a canal to Este, where he rebuilt the citadel, and Montagnano. He patronised the wool industry to develop commerce and confirmed the ancient privileges of the University of Padua to develop education. He appointed Rainiero Arsendi da Forlì to the chair of civil law in 1344.

On 27 March 1345, on the advice of his vicar Pietro da Campagnola, he nominated Marsilietto Papafava, a relative, his heir, bypassing Jacopo, the son of Nicolò. On 29 March, he died and was buried in the church of Sant'Agostino, although his body and tomb were later transferred to the Augustinian Church of the Eremitani in Padua in 1820.

== Marriages ==
Ubertinello was married twice. His first wife was Giacomina, daughter of Simone da Correggio, uncle of Alberto and Mastino della Scala. This marriage was later annulled on the grounds of being attained by force at the suggestion of Marsilio.

His second marriage was contracted on 24 April 1340 with Anna Malatesta, daughter of Malatestino Novello.

== Sources ==
- Ganguzza Billanovich, M. Chiara (1977). "CARRARA, Ubertino da". Dizionario Biografico degli Italiani (in Italian). Vol. 20: Carducci–Carusi. Rome: Institute of the Italian Encyclopaedia. ISBN 978-88-12-00032-6.
- Kohl, Benjamin G. (1998). Padua under the Carrara, 1318–1405. Baltimore and London: Johns Hopkins University Press. ISBN 0-8018-5703-1.

Preceded by Marsilio	Lord of Padua; 1338–1345	Succeeded by Jacopo II
