= Papafava =

Italian noble family

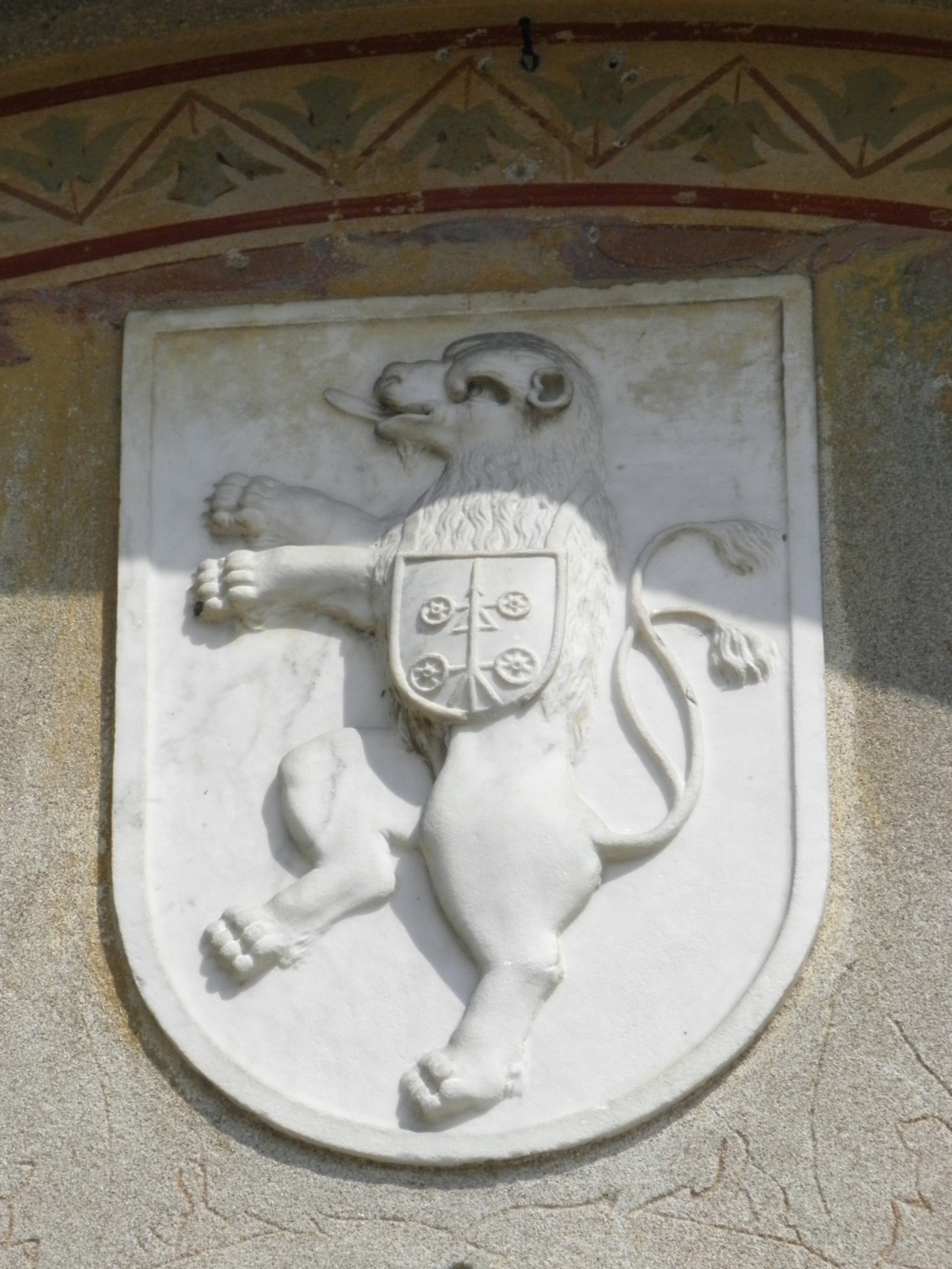

Origin
- Word/name: Italy

The Papafava (sometimes also Pappafava, more precisely Papafava dei Carraresi) were an aristocratic family of Padua, a junior branch of the Carraresi. It was admitted into the Venetian patriciate among the so-called Houses Made for Money.

== History ==
The family is a branch of the most famous Carraresi: the first to bear the nickname Papafava was a Giacomino da Carrara, Viceroy of Vicenza in 1269, who lived in the 13th century. The lord of Padua Marsilietto Papafava from Carrara was part of the Papafava family branch.

The original branch, the one of Papafava dei Carraresi, settled in Venice, where as a result of the financial support that its members gave to the Republic in the War of Candia against the Ottomans, in 1652 they were referred to the Venetian patrician in the person of Cav. Bonifacio Papafava, thus ensuring access to the Greater Council. The Papafava of the Carraresi were confirmed noble by the Austrian imperial government with the Sovereign Resolution of November 22, 1817.

A secondary branch, but no less important, was that of the Papafava Antonini, resident in Padua. Those, members of the noble council of Padua, occupied important municipal offices. They were never united with the Venetian patriciate but gained the comic title connected with the civil and criminal jurisdiction of the villas of Silvella and Coseano, which were invested on September 23, 1745 by Doge Pietro Grimani.

After the fall of the Serenissima, their nobility was recognized by Vienna with the Sovereign Resolution of September 4, 1818; the rank of accounts of the Austrian Empire was granted on October 19, 1823.

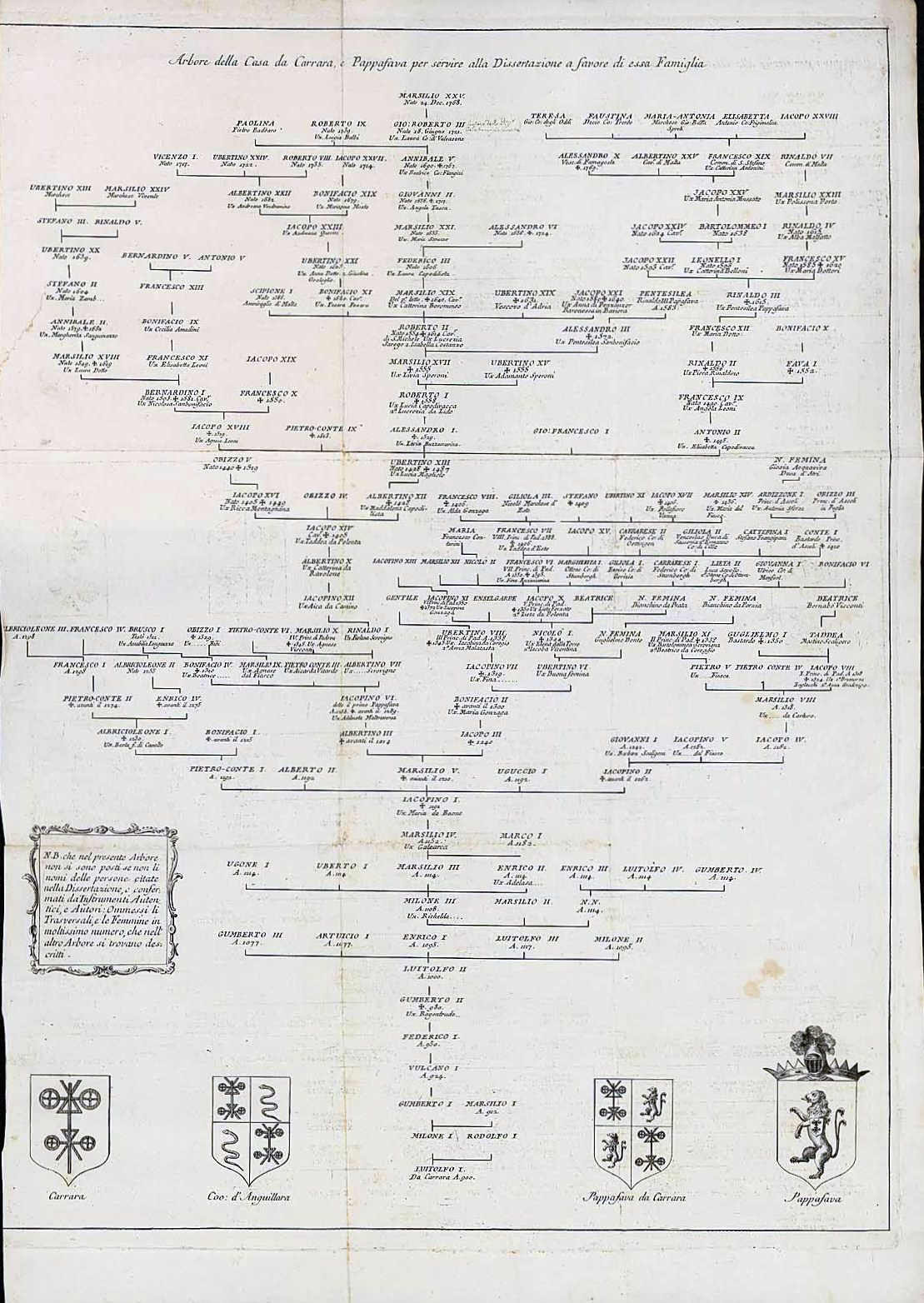
Family tree of Carraresi and Papafava families (second half of XVIII century).

== Distinguished Members ==
- Marsilio Papafava died in 1555, husband of Lucia Speroni daughter of Sperone Speroni and father of Roberto husband of Isabella of Costanzo and in turn father of Bonifacio (1588-1680).
- Bonifacio Papafava (1588-1680), son of Roberto, husband of Pesarina Pesaro in 1615, father of: Emilia who was portrayed by Tiberio Tinelli and married Troiano Borromeo; of Beatrice 1626-1729) wife of Marco Giuseppe Citadel of Onara (1624-1666) and mother of Francesco husband of Maria Buzzaccarini . It was created by the Gonzaga Knight of the Order of the Redeemer .
- Marsilio Papafava husband of Caterina Borromeo father of Federico husband of Laura Capodilista and father of Giovanni Marsilio (1665-1717).
- Giovanni Marsilio Papafava (1665-1717) son of Marsilio and Maria Soranzo, husband in 1688 Angela Maria Tasca, father of Annibale (1690-1766) husband of Beatrice Flangini and in turn father of: Gianroberto born in 1722 husband of Laura Valvasone, Roberto born in 1739, husband of Luigia Balbi and Paola wife of Pietro Badoer.
- Marsilio Papafava born in 1768, son of Gianroberto, husband of Maddalena Toderini, nephew of Ferdinando Toderini born in 1727 and father of Laura wife of Giuseppe Gozzadini and mother of Giovanni Gozzadini (1810-1887) husband of Maria Teresa Serego Alighieri (1812-1881).
- Giacomo Papafava, son of Francesco and Caterina Antonini, husband of Arpalice Brazzà was father of: Caterina (1776-1800) wife of Giacomo Polcastro, Laura wife of Severiano Dotto, Alessandro, and Francesco husband of Giovanna Luisa Boncompagni - Ludovisi - Ottoboni the Dukes of Fiano and father of Giacomo, who purchased in 1805 the Palazzo Trento Papafava.
- Alberto Papafava (1832-1929), painter, husband of Margherita Cittadella Vigodarzere daughter of Andrea Cittadella Vigodarzere and Arpalice Papafava was father of Francesco (1864-1912).
- Francesco Papafava (1864-1912) son of Alberto, author and author of "Ten Years of Italian Life" married Maria Bracceschi (1867-1952) and was the father of: Novello Papafava and Margherita (1893-1967) wife of Lucangelo Bracci Testasecca.
- Novello Papafava dei Carraresi (1899 - 1973), Italian writer, president of Rai from 1961 to 1964.

== Places and Architectures ==
- Palazzo Papafava dei Carraresi, in Padua, located in Via Marsala. The stable can boast the hospitality offered to historic people visiting the city, such as the Emperor of Austria-Hungary Francesco Giuseppe, the King of Italy Umberto I and the Emperor Pedro of Brazil. At the time of the last world conflict, the rectorate of the University of Padua was home to (the rector of Concept Marchesi) and the Italian Social Republic, there, was the Ministry of National Education. In the second world-war period, part of the spaces housed classrooms and offices at the Faculty of Magisterium of the University of Patavina. The lovely garden of the Palace is cited in Guido Piovene's book "Travel in Italy".
- Palazzo Pesaro Papafava, in Cannaregio
- Palazzo Papafava Schiesari Bergonzini, in Conselve
- Palazzo Tasca Papafava at Castello
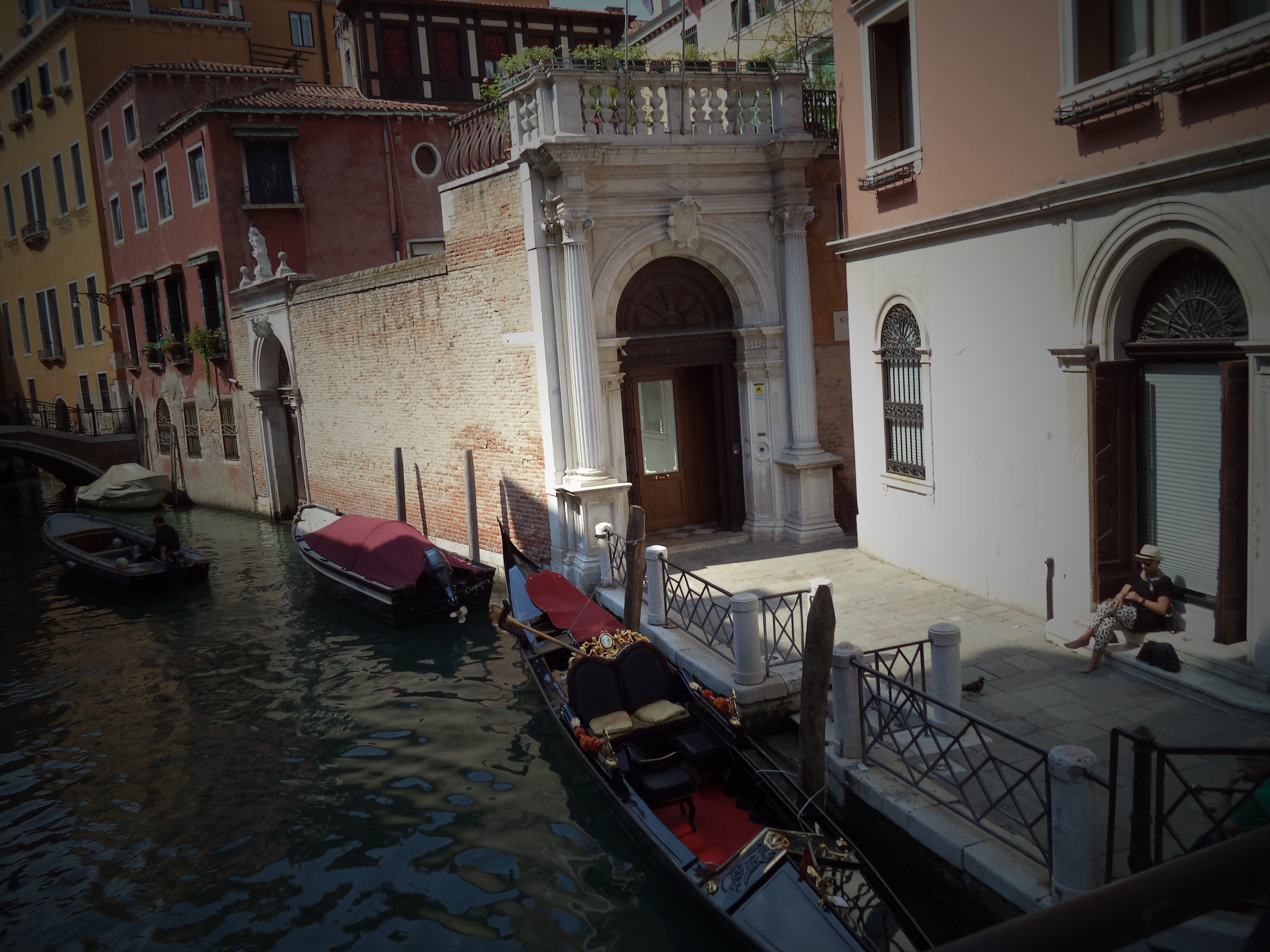
- The Tasca Papafava ground floor at Ponte della Guerra in Venice
  Villa Papafava in Rovolon
- Villa Papafava, in Terme Euganee, of which today only the barchessa remains.

There is also a foundation Tasca or Papafava in Castello, in Venice.

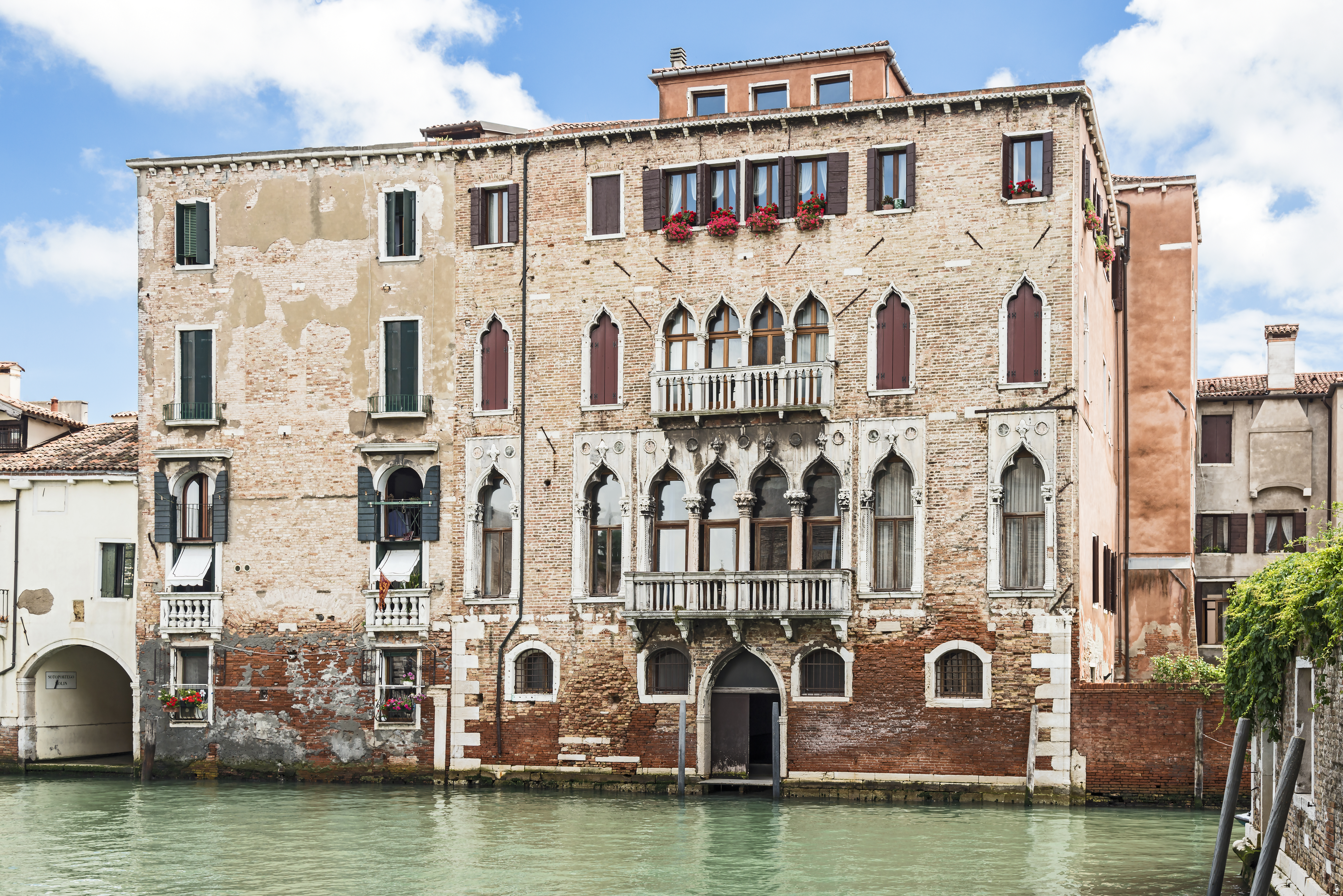
Palazzo Pesaro Papafava at Misericordia (Cannaregio)

== Notes ==
- Mario Castagna, Coat of Arms and Housewives, Montichiari, 2002. OCLC 50300620
- Litta Biumi, Pompeo. Famiglie celebri italiane (in Italian). Milano: Luciano Basadonna Editore.
