= Marsilio da Carrara =

Lord of Padua

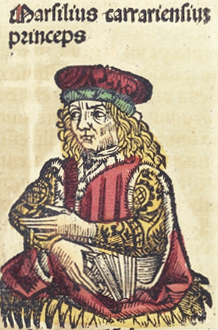
Generic portrait of Marsilius carrariensium princeps, woodcut from the Nuremberg Chronicle

Marsilio da Carrara (1294 – March 1338) was Lord of Padua after his uncle Jacopo I. He was a member of the Carraresi family. (Also known as the Carrara family.)

He successfully faced a plot against him in the city. However, after the treason of his nephew Nicolò da Carrara, who had sided with the Scaliger of Verona, Marsilio was forced to relinquish Padua to Cangrande della Scala in 1328. He retained the title of vicar for the city and managed to marry Jacopo's daughter Taddea to Mastino II della Scala. In the war against the Papal States, he warred alongside the latter at Brescia in 1330/1331, conquering the city by treason. In the following years, he acted as vicar of Brescia. In 1332, Marsilio had his wife, Bartolomea Scrovegni, poisoned, suspecting she was unfaithful.

After Cangrande's death, he was able to reconquer Padua in 1337 thanks to an alliance with Florence and Venice, which was increasingly worried by the Scaligers' rise to power.

He died in 1338, being succeeded by his cousin Ubertinello.

== Bibliography ==
- History and Chronology of Carraresi family (in Italian)

== Sources ==
- Ganguzza Billanovich, M. Chiara (1977). "CARRARA, Marsilio da". Dizionario Biografico degli Italiani (in Italian). Vol. 20: Carducci–Carusi. Rome: Istituto dell'Enciclopedia Italiana. ISBN 978-88-12-00032-6.
- Kohl, Benjamin G. (1998). Padua under the Carrara, 1318–1405. Baltimore and London: Johns Hopkins University Press. ISBN 0-8018-5703-1.

Preceded by Jacopo I	Lord of Padua; 1324–1328	Succeeded by Cangrande I della Scala
Preceded by Mastino II della Scala; Alberto II della Scala	Lord of Padua; 1337–1338	Succeeded by Ubertinello
