= Epistle to Cangrande =

Letter attributed to Dante Alighieri

- Epistola a Cangrande
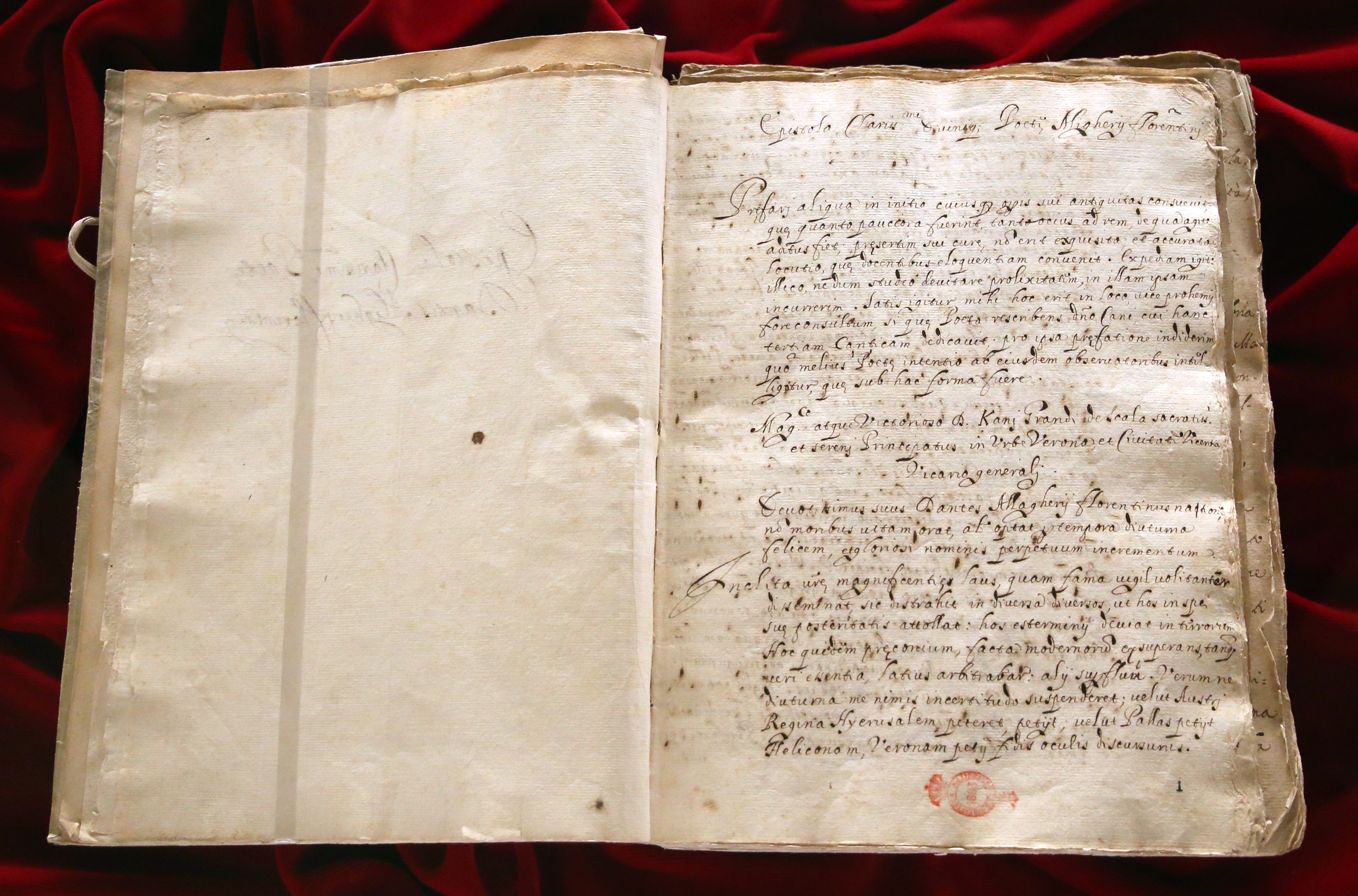
- Manuscript copy of the Epistle to Cangrande
- Full title: Epistle XIII to Cangrande della Scala
- Ascribed to: Dante Alighieri
- Dedicated to: Cangrande della Scala
- Language: Latin
- Date: before 1343
- Authenticity: Disputed
- Genre: Epistle
- Subject: Meaning of the Divine Comedy

The Epistle XIII to Cangrande della Scala (Italian: Epistola XIII a Cangrande della Scala) is a letter of disputed authenticity sent by Dante Alighieri to his patron, Cangrande I della Scala.

== History ==
The exact date that the letter was written is unknown. The letter was cited by the Italian copyist Andrea Lancia in 1343 and then by the chronicler Filippo Villani around 1400. Some authors have suggested that Jacopo della Lana cited the letter in the 1320s, but this is disputed. Nine manuscripts of the Epistle survive, though the earliest three contain only the dedication.

== Content ==
The letter is divided into three parts: A dedication of Dante's Paradiso to Cangrande I della Scala, an accessus (i.e. introduction) to Dante's Divine Comedy, and an exposition of the first twelve lines of Paradiso, translated from Italian into Latin.

== Authenticity ==
...the paternity of the Epistle has been for some time a political football in Dante studies. It is a talismanic topic, and by revealing one's position with regard to the paternity of the Epistle, one potentially reveals a host of other vested interests and beliefs

— Teodolinda Barolini

The question of whether or not the Epistle is a forgery is controversial among Dante scholars. Scholars such as Francesco D'Ovidio and Bruno Nardi have argued against its authenticity, whereas scholars such as Francesco Mazzoni, Robert Hollander, and Charles Singleton have argued in favor.

The Epistle was never mentioned by the notable early Dante commentators Guido da Pisa or Pietro Allighieri, despite their commentaries containing passages identical to parts of the Epistle, which led the scholar F. P. Luiso to conclude in 1902 that it was forged by combining those passages. In 1943, the Italian philologist Augusto Mancini argued that only the dedication is authentic, in part due to the manuscript history, and in part due to what he perceived as "clumsy stitches between... two separate texts" at the end of the introduction. The German scholar Peter Dronke later concurred that only the introduction followed "the customary rhythmic patterns of Dante’s prose". The position is also held by the researcher Henry Ansgar Kelly and by the Italian philologist Carlo Ginzburg. The latter went so far as to ascribe authorship of the rest of the Epistle to Giovanni Boccaccio, pointing to similarities between the Epistle and a section of Boccaccio's Decameron. As for Boccaccio's motive, Ginzburg wrote that "Dante’s use of the vernacular in a poem like the [Divine Comedy], which deals with sublime matters, was immediately perceived as a scandal: literary, religious, and political. The Epistle to Cangrande... was a deliberate attempt to remove that stumbling block."

The academics Ralph G. Hall and Madison U. Sowell have suggested that American scholars are more likely to accept the Epistle as authentic while British and Italian scholars are more likely to consider it a forgery. John Ciardi, who wrote a translation of the Divine Comedy, argued that the framework provided by the letter is useful regardless of its authenticity. The scholar Teodolinda Barolini has described the Epistle as a red herring, writing that "frankly, I don't care if the Epistle is Dante's or not, since I think the answers that I seek regarding the [Divine Comedy] are to be found in the poem itself."

In 2019, researchers for the Italian Istituto di Scienza e Tecnologie dell'Informazione attempted to use machine learning to determine authorship of the Epistle. Their results supported the theory that it was forged, though the authors noted that their study "should not be considered conclusive".
