= Palazzo Papafava dei Carraresi =

Coordinates: 45.40499°N 11.87314°E

- Interactive map of the Palazzo Papafava dei Carraresi area

General information
- Location: Veneto, Padua, Italy

Palazzo Papafava dei Carraresi is a palace in Padua, located in the historic center of the city.

== History ==
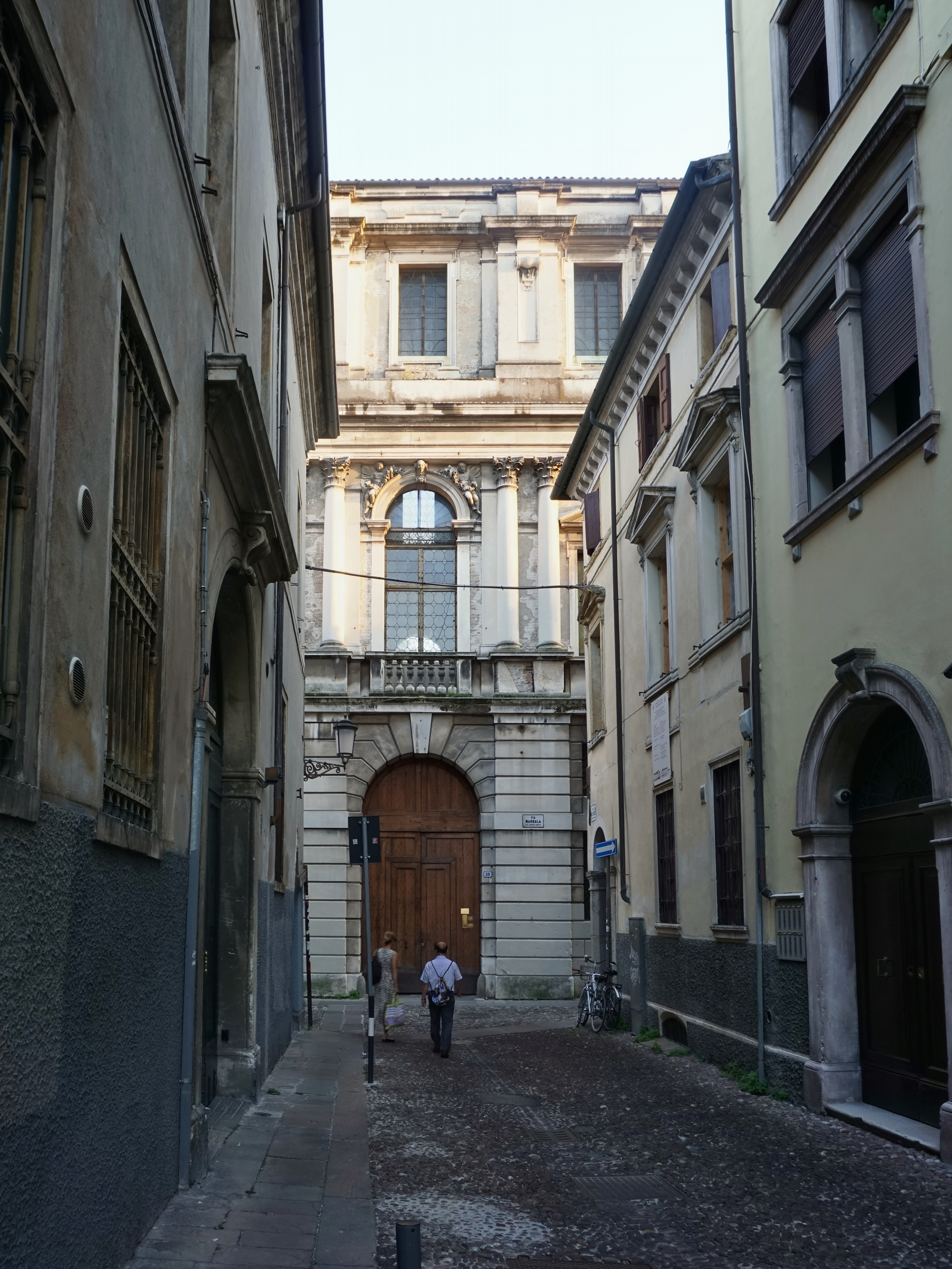
View of the Palazzo from Via Obizzi

It was erected in 1763 by the order of Count Giambattista Trento, in 1805 the property was acquired by inheritance from the Papafava dei Carraresi family.

== Architecture ==
The palace, of considerable size and of classical prospect, was designed by Giovan Battista Novello. The setting of interior spaces is unusual for the Venetian area: the rooms are organized starting from a large entrance hall with Doric columns on which a Juvarrian stairwell opens. This setting was retained a few years later in the Palazzo Maldura.
