= Carraresi =

Medieval Italian noble family

- Founded: 10th century
- Founder: Gumberto
- Final ruler: Francesco Novello da Carrara
- Titles: Lords of Padua
- Dissolution: 15th century
- Deposition: 1435
- Cadet branches: Papafava

The House of Carrara or Carraresi (da Carrara) was an important family of northern Italy in the 12th to 15th centuries. The family held the title of Lords of Padua from 1318 to 1405.

Under their rule, Padua conquered Verona, Vicenza, Treviso, Feltre, Belluno, Bassano, Aquileia and Udine, thus controlling much of the Veneto and part of Friuli. However, in 1405 Padua and the da Carrara family were defeated by the Republic of Venice, that effectively prevented the creation of a large regional state with Padua as its capital.

== History ==
As signori of Padua, their overwhelming power and patronage placed them in an isolated position far outshining any other single family. Their extensive land holdings in the Paduan contado were supplemented by extensive property within the comune itself, and their political prominence made them comparable to the Scaligeri of contemporary Verona, or the Visconti of Milan. Margaret Plant has examined how "in its period of domination in Padua from 1337 to 1405 the house of Carrara sustained a singular chapter in the history of patronage". Francesco il Vecchio, son of Giacomo, a close friend of Petrarch in his early years, was a noted patron of Petrarch himself and commissioned frescoes (destroyed) illustrating Petrarch's De viris illustribus in the palazzo, c. 1367–1379, employing Guariento and others; Petrarch's retirement years were spent at Arquà, a Carrara fief, and he bequeathed to Francesco his picture of the Virgin by Giotto.

Coming from Carrara Santo Stefano, near Padua, the family had their origin in a certain Gamberto/Gumberto, of Lombard origin, to judge from his name and that of his son Luitolfo, founder of the abbey of Carrara in 1027; Gumberto was signore of castrum Carrariae, the Castello of Carrara San Giorgio. Faithful to the emperors generation after generation, after becoming lords of Pernumia, in 1338 they ousted the Veronese della Scala from Padua and became the lords of that city. In 1388 a coalition of Milanese and Venetians forced Francesco il Vecchio to abdicate in favor of his son. The Venetians annexed Padua as Venetian territory in 1405. The elder Cararrese line was extinguished with the murders of Francesco Novello da Carrara and all his sons but Marsilio and bishop Stefano in a Venetian prison in 1406; Marsilio died soon after, and Stefano fled to Rome, where he lived until 1448; all Paduan bishops to the end of the Venetian Republic (1797), with two exceptions, were Venetian nobles. The Baptistery at Padua, which was under Carrarese patronage and served as their mortuary chapels, reverted to the bishop and the cathedral chapter; its Carrarese tombs were removed when the floor level was raised.

Part of their palace in Padua is still standing. Notable parts are the Loggia and the Sala dei Giganti. They erected the important Abbazia di Santo Stefano abbey in the locality Carrara Santo Stefano, between the modern Due Carrare and Padua. The abbey's church, dedicated to Saint Stephen, is still standing today and contains, among others, the tomb of Marsilio da Carrara.

In the 15th century the Carraresi were represented in the cadet male line of the two descended from 13th-century brothers Marsilio (the elder) and Jacopino (the younger). The imprese of the family coat of arms is a four-wheeled cart (carro), and the family colors are red and white, in a checkerboard arrangement.

== Notable members ==
- Gumberto (died before 970)
- Gumberto (died before 1027)
- Litolfo da Carrara (died before 1068), who founded the Abbazia of Santo Stefano in Due Carrare (1027).
- Artiuccio
- Gumberto (known in 1077)
- Marsilio (known in 1109)
- Marsilio (died before 1210)
- Jacopino (died before 1262)
- Jacopo I, called "The Great", lord of Padua (died 1324)
- Marsilio, lord of Padua (died 1338)
- Ubertinello, lord of Padua (died 1345)
- Marsilietto Papafava, lord of Padua (died 1345)
- Jacopo II, lord of Padua (d. 1350)
- Francesco "il Vecchio", lord of Padua (abdicated in favor of his son, 1388; died a prisoner of Giangaleazzo Visconti at Monza, 1393)
- Francesco Novello (1359–1406)
- Francesco III (died 1405)
- Giacomo (died 1405)
- Marsilio (died 1435)

== Sources ==
- Kohl, Benjamin G. (1998). Padua under the Carrara, 1318–1405. Baltimore: Johns Hopkins University Press. ISBN 0801857031.
