= Jacopo II da Carrara =

Lord of Padua

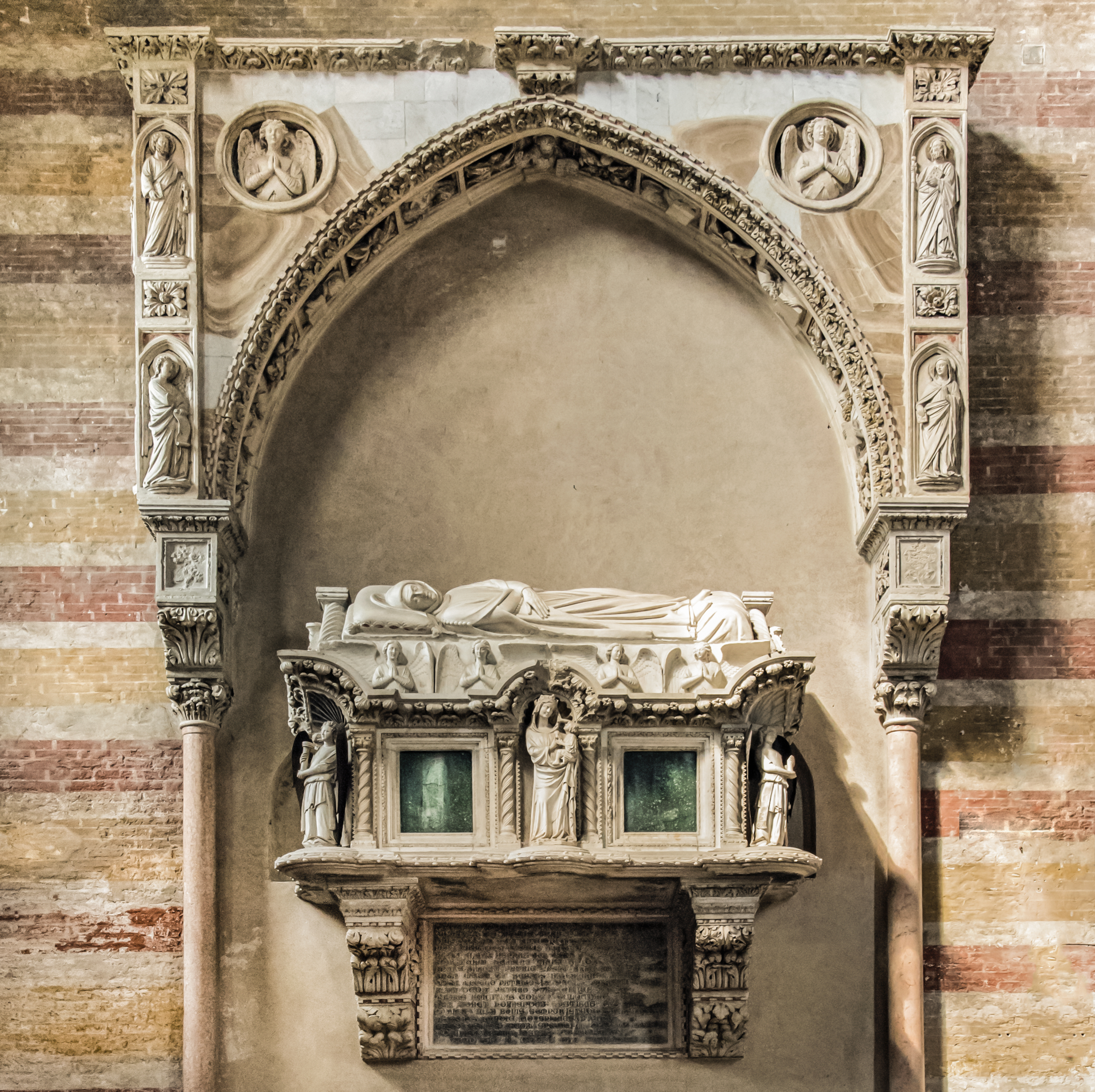
Tomb of Jacopo II da Carrara in Church of the Eremitani

Jacopo II da Carrara (or Giacomo II) (died 1350), of the Carraresi family, was the capitano del popolo of Padua from 1345 until his death. Though he assumed power through forged documents and political murder, he was a patron of art and literature. He succeeded in bringing Francesco Petrarca to Padua for a time, and his own son, Francesco I, was an artisan. Jacopo also introduced the carrarino as the currency of Padua.

In May 1345 Jacopo murdered the incumbent prince, Marsiglietto Papafava. He in turn was assassinated in 1350. At his death he was still illiterate, a fact he much regretted, as Petrus Paulus Vergerius wrote in a letter to his grandson Ubertino. His younger brother Jacopino succeeded him as capitano, to be succeeded in turn by Francesco. In 1351 Petrarca wrote a eulogy for the deceased Jacopo, Andriolo de Santi was commissioned to carve his sepulchre, and Guariento di Arpo began work on a fresco of the coronation of the Virgin Mary to adorn his tomb in the church of Sant' Agostino. When the church was demolished in 1820, the body and tomb were moved to the Church of the Eremitani in Padua, where they reside today.

== Sources ==
- Ganguzza Billanovich, M. Chiara (1977). "CARRARA, Giacomo da". Dizionario Biografico degli Italiani (in Italian). Vol. 20: Carducci–Carusi. Rome: Istituto dell'Enciclopedia Italiana. ISBN 978-88-12-00032-6.
- Kohl, Benjamin G. (1998). Padua under the Carrara, 1318–1405. Baltimore and London: Johns Hopkins University Press. ISBN 0-8018-5703-1.
