= Cangrande I della Scala =

Italian ruler and patron of Dante Alighieri

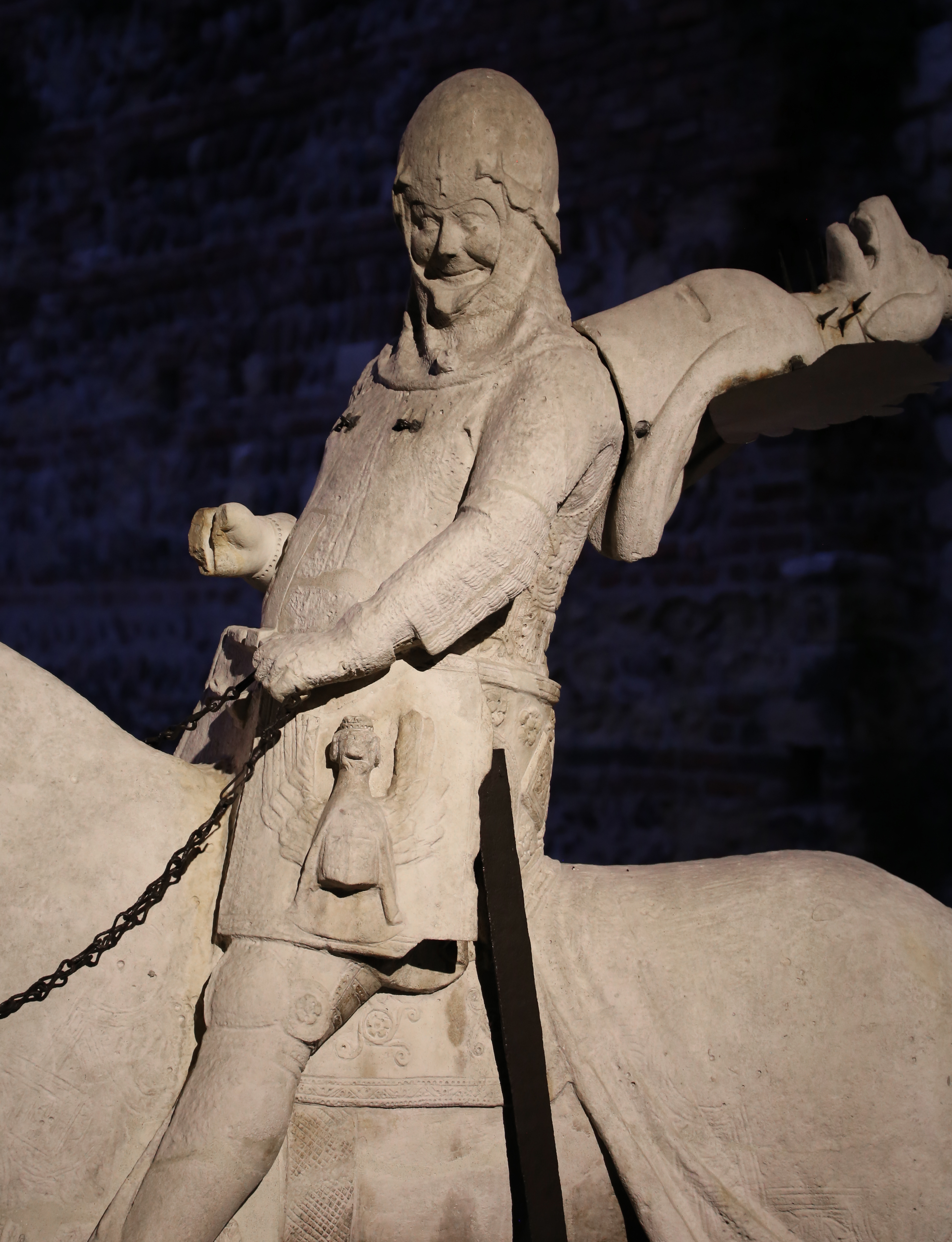
- Equestrian Statue of Cangrande, circa 1340, from his monument in Verona, with dog's head crest atop helm and on thigh

Lord of Verona and Imperial vicar
- Born: 9 March 1291; Verona
- Died: 22 July 1329; Treviso
- Noble family: Scaliger
- Spouse: Giovanna di Svevia
- Father: Alberto I della Scala
- Mother: Verde da Salizzole

Cangrande (christened Can Francesco) della Scala (9 March 1291 – 22 July 1329) was an Italian nobleman, belonging to the della Scala family that ruled Verona from 1308 until 1387. He was indeed one of the most important characters at the time of signorie during the period where Italy divided in comuni. Now perhaps best known as the leading patron of the poet Dante Alighieri and featuring prominently in Giovanni Boccaccio's almost contemporary Decameron, Cangrande was in his own day chiefly acclaimed as a successful warrior and autocrat. Between becoming sole ruler of Verona in 1311 and his death in 1329 he took control of several neighbouring cities, notably Vicenza, Padua and Treviso, and came to be regarded as the leader of the Ghibelline faction in northern Italy.

== Early life ==
Cangrande was born in Verona, the third son of Alberto I della Scala, ruler of Verona, by his wife Verde da Salizzole. Christened Can Francesco, perhaps partly in punning homage to his uncle Mastino ("mastiff") I, the founder of the Scaligeri dynasty, his physical and mental precocity soon earned him the name Cangrande, signifying "big dog" or "great dog". The canine allusion was emphasised by the Scaliger lords from Cangrande's reign onwards by the adoption of a dog's head heraldic crest atop their helmets and also on their tombs and other monuments.

Cangrande was held in great affection by his father who took the extraordinary step of knighting him while still a child on 11 November 1301. On Alberto's death in 1301, Cangrande was entrusted to the guardianship of his eldest brother Bartolomeo I della Scala, in whose brief reign he probably first met Dante when the poet took refuge in Verona following his exile from Florence.

=== Physical appearance and personality ===
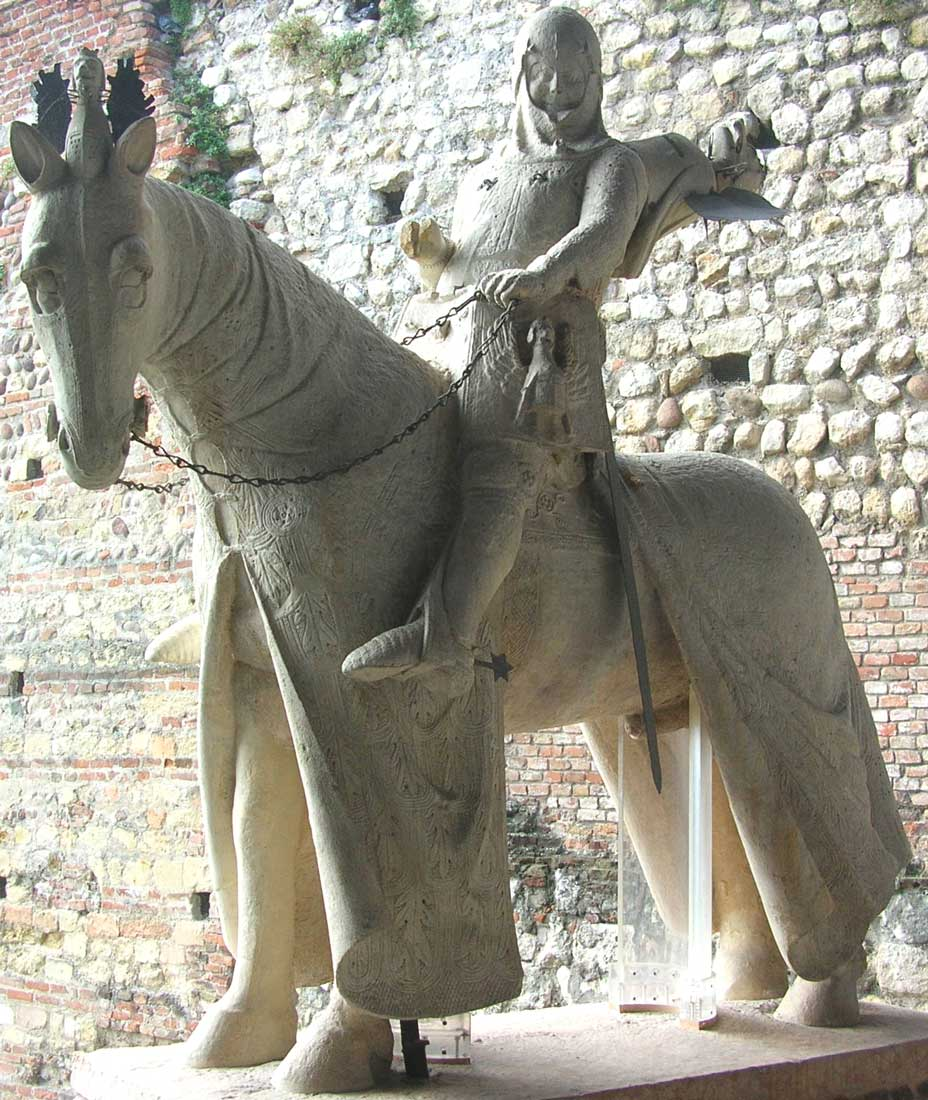
Equestrian Statue of Cangrande in the Castelvecchio Museum, Verona

Investigations following the exhumation of his mummified corpse in 2004 indicate that Cangrande was 1.73 metres (about 5 ft 8 in) tall with a long face, prominent jaw and curly chestnut hair. Considerable physical strength and endurance are attested to by the almost ceaseless military campaigns described by contemporary historians and poets. He was known both for his joviality and furious temper and for his open disposition, being fond of discourse with people of all social classes. He was an eloquent speaker, and argument and debate for its own sake was one of his favourite peacetime pastimes when he was not out hunting or hawking. His bravery in battle is well documented; his mercy to defeated foes impressed even his enemies, among them the Paduan historian and dramatist Albertino Mussato, who praised Cangrande's honourable treatment of Vinciguerra di San Bonifacio after the conflict at Vicenza in 1317. He was devoutly religious and fasted twice a week in honour of the Virgin Mary, to whom he was especially devoted.

== The emperor's right-hand man ==
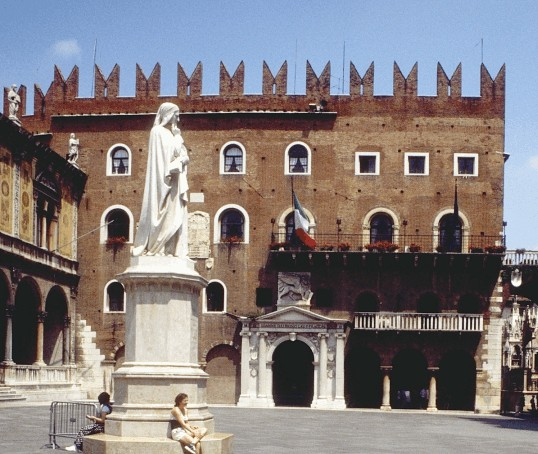
Palazzo Cangrande in Verona

Cangrande saw his first military action in the campaigns of his other brother Alboino I della Scala—who succeeded Bartolomeo in 1304—fighting alongside other Ghibelline leaders against the Guelph dynast Azzo VIII of Este, Lord of Ferrara. In 1308, he began to share the rule of Verona with Alboino. This was also the year of his marriage to Giovanna, daughter of Conrad of Antioch and a descendant of the Holy Roman Emperor Frederick II, a union which was to endure for his lifetime but bring no heirs, although he fathered several illegitimate children.

In November 1310, the Holy Roman Emperor Henry VII arrived in Italy intent on reconciling Guelph and Ghibelline under the banner of a united empire. In reality, he soon found himself reliant on the support of Ghibelline magnates to further his aims, prominent among them Cangrande and Alboino, whom he made Imperial Vicars of Verona. In April 1311, the two brothers co-led an Imperial Army which swiftly liberated Verona's neighbour Vicenza from the rule of Padua, this city having rebelled against the Emperor's authority.

From May to October of the same year, Cangrande commanded the Italian levies in the siege of Brescia, where the Guelph faction had seized control in defiance of Henry. When the Guelphs surrendered on 16 September 1311, he was chosen to ride at the head of three hundred knights in Henry's triumphal entry into the city. He set out later to accompany the Emperor on his coronation journey to Rome but hastened back to Verona on hearing that his brother had fallen dangerously ill. On 29 November 1311, Alboino died and Cangrande became sole ruler of Verona at the age of twenty.

== Struggle for Vicenza ==
Canting arms of the della Scala family: Gules, a scaling ladder erect argent

In February 1312, Cangrande became ruler of Verona's neighbouring city of Vicenza by an act of political opportunism, taking advantage of that city's disputes with its former overlords in Padua. Padua's ruling council decided to wrest their former territory from Cangrande and defy the Emperor who had backed his takeover by electing him Vicenza's Imperial Vicar. In early spring 1312 the Paduan army began to ravage the territories of Vicenza and Verona. For some eighteen months, Cangrande was hard-pressed to defend Vicenza and even Verona itself from these incursions.

The death of Henry VII in August 1313 freed Cangrande from his duty to provide resources to the Imperial cause and a change of government at Padua gave him time to amass a sizable army. From the spring of 1314, he pursued the same punitive tactics as his enemies, burning crops and towns in Paduan territory. The devastation of the rural districts tolled heavily on Padua, whose ruling council decided to end the war once and for all by taking Vicenza with overwhelming force. A large army under Padua's warrior Podestà Ponzino de' Ponzini marched through the night and invaded the Vincentine suburb of San Pietro in the early hours of 17 September 1314.

Cangrande was absent at Verona at the time but soon learned of events and rode out instantly for Vicenza, covering the distance in three hours. On arriving in the city he mounted a warhorse and without hesitation led an impromptu attack on the invaders who had still not penetrated beyond the suburbs. The historian and dramatist Albertino Mussato, who was with the Paduan forces, recounts how this sudden assault quickly developed into a rout of the whole Paduan army in which Cangrande, standing up in his stirrups, urged his followers to "slay the cowardly foe" before charging onwards, mace in hand, carrying all before him "as fire fanned by the wind devours stubble".

Cangrande's victory was so comprehensive he was able to conclude a peace treaty in October 1314 in which Padua recognised his supremacy over Vicenza. His military reputation was also much enhanced. Daring feats of arms such as his hell-for-leather ride to Vicenza appealed to the popular imagination, even gaining the reluctant admiration of such men as Mussato, who fervently opposed Cangrande's autocratic style of rule. It typified the qualities for which he was to become increasingly famous: an almost reckless bravery in battle, coupled with magnanimity towards defeated enemies, some of whom he befriended in captivity. Among his prisoners on this occasion were the influential Paduan nobles Jacopo da Carrara and his nephew Marsilio, who became major players in Cangrande's later career.

== A staunch Ghibelline ==
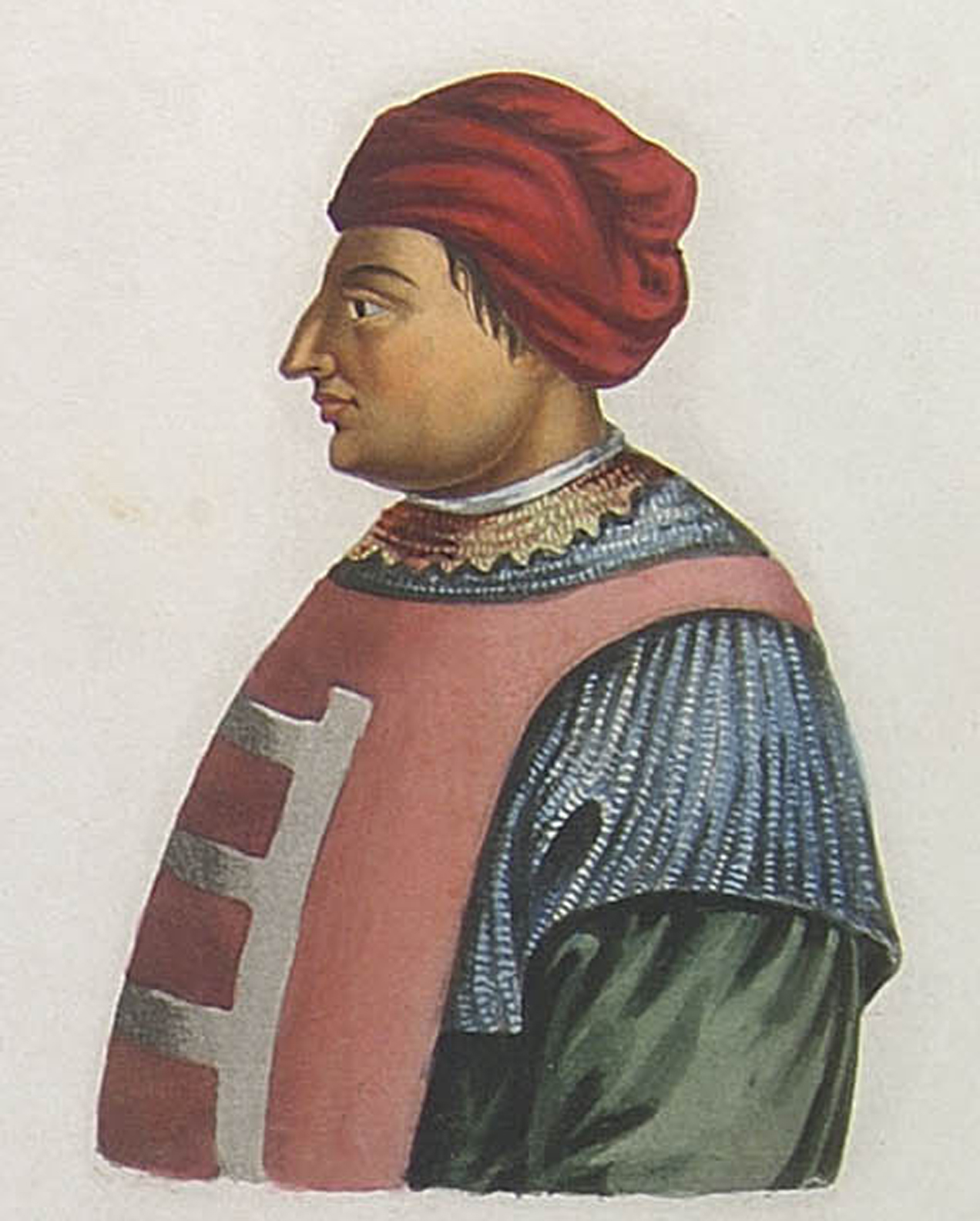
Imaginary depiction of Cangrande, displaying on the breast of his tabard the arms of della Scala

With Vicenza secured, Cangrande was able to involve himself in territories to the west of Verona. With the aid of Rinaldo "Passerino" Bonacolsi, ruler of Mantua, he had by September 1316 helped secure Ghibelline supremacy in Western Lombardy. He then turned his attention back to his personal goal of conquering the Trevisan Mark, launching an unsuccessful attack on Treviso in November 1316.

On 16 March 1316, Cangrande had officially recognised Frederick I of Austria as Holy Roman Emperor, receiving from him confirmation of the Imperial Vicariates of Verona and Vicenza and incurring the wrath of Pope John XXII, who recognised neither Frederick nor his rival, Louis IV of Bavaria, as Emperor. Cangrande ignored the Pope's threats of excommunication and re-emphasised his Ghibelline credentials by attacking the Guelphs of Brescia in concert with the feared Tuscan warlord Uguccione della Faggiuola. He was about to lay siege to the city in May 1317 when he heard that Vicenza was about to be betrayed to a group of exiles backed by Paduan troops under the Guelph nobleman Count Vinciguerra di San Bonifacio, whose family had long ago been exiled from Verona by Cangrande's uncle Mastino I della Scala.

== Second war with Padua ==
Cangrande and Uguccione della Faggiuola arrived outside Vicenza with a large force on 21 May 1317. Cangrande secretly entered Vicenza and the next day at dawn disguised as a Vincentine Guelph he encouraged the Paduans to enter the city, suddenly rushing upon them in person with a small body of troops as they moved to enter the gates while Uguccione's larger force attacked from the rear, albeit in the nick of time for Cangrande's habitual impetuosity had nearly cost him dearly, and decisively ended the battle. Cangrande showed magnanimity to his hereditary foe Vinciguerra di San Bonifacio who was seriously wounded in the conflict, having him nursed at his own palace and affording him a magnificent funeral on his death a few weeks later.

Cangrande wasted little time in accusing Padua of breaking the peace treaty of 1314. In December 1317, Venice, which had overseen this treaty, finally declared it null and void. Cangrande set out immediately with a large army to surprise the town of Monselice, a key Paduan stronghold on the eastern slopes of the Euganean Hills. Monselice was betrayed to the Veronese vanguard on 21 December and the rich town of Este soon followed, encircled by Cangrande's forces and called on to surrender. The garrison resisted, whereupon Cangrande plunged into the moat and led his forces on an all-out assault on the walls. In a short space of time, the town was taken, sacked and burnt. Following this, many other towns in the area surrendered in fear of suffering a similar fate.

After Christmas Cangrande marched his army to the walls of Padua itself in an effort to terrify the populace into surrender. The Paduan Greater Council represented by Jacopo da Carrara felt compelled to agree to any terms other than unconditional surrender and on 12 February 1318 ceded Monselice, Este, Castelbaldo and Montagnana to Cangrande for life and ordered the restoration of citizens exiled from Padua.

== Second military campaign against Treviso ==
Cangrande spent the spring and summer of 1318 fighting for the Ghibelline cause in various cities, undeterred by the Pope's excommunication (enforced in April for his persistent refusal to renounce his Imperial Vicariates). In autumn his attention turned once more to the Trevisan Mark. He was unable to attack Padua because of the peace treaty but had considerable influence there due to his friendship with the Da Carrara family which was now dominant in the city. He cemented his informal alliance with the Carrara late in 1318 by betrothing his twelve-year-old nephew Mastino (the future Mastino II della Scala) with Taddea, Jacopo da Carrara's baby daughter. Meanwhile, in alliance with Uguccione della Faggiuola he had launched another military campaign against Treviso.

The attack on Treviso was made with the promise of help from certain nobles within the city who hoped Cangrande would restore them to power. Although this plot did enable him to take some outlying castles but fell short of taking the city itself for the citizens appealed to Frederick I of Austria who ordered Cangrande to stop his assault in return for the Trevisans accepting his authority and allowing him to appoint an Imperial Vicar.

In the same month a convention of Ghibelline leaders at Soncino headed by Matteo I Visconti of Milan appointed Cangrande "Captain and Rector of the Imperial Party of Lombardy". Cangrande accepted the title without doing much to earn it, being for the moment more concerned with renewed attempts to conquer Treviso. He came close to success but was eventually thwarted in June when the Trevisans reluctantly accepted the protection of the powerful Henry III of Gorizia, Frederick I of Austria's nominated Imperial Vicar. Cangrande immediately turned his attention to Padua, picking a quarrel with his erstwhile ally Jacopo da Carrara.

== Third war with Padua ==
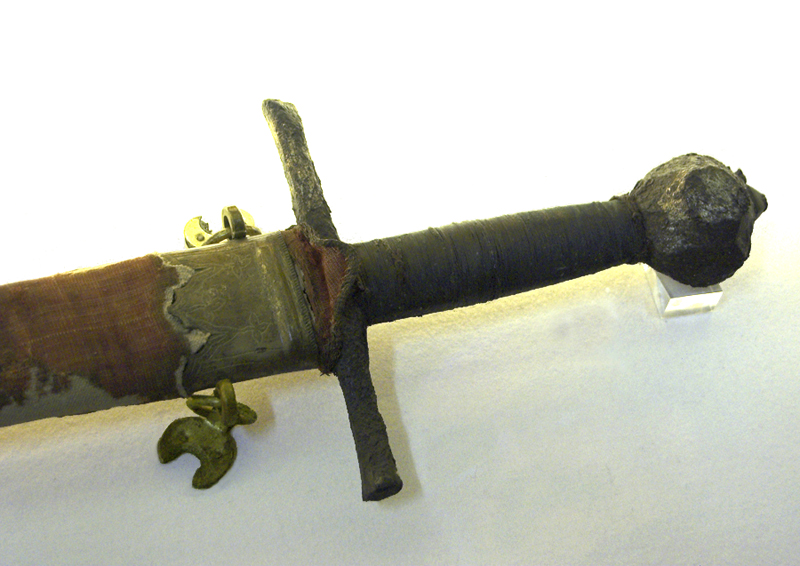
Cangrande's sword

In August 1319 Cangrande invaded Paduan territory and established a permanent camp south of the city near the town of Bassanello. He then set about laying siege to Padua while his troops set about attacking towns still under Paduan control.

During the autumn of 1319 Padua negotiated with Henry of Gorizia, who was based still at Treviso, hoping for his assistance. Henry waited until the Paduan position was so desperate that they would submit to him as Frederick of Austria's representative. This the Greater Council of Padua finally did on 4 November 1319 whereupon Henry assembled a large army and on 5 January 1320 entered the city as Imperial Vicar, Jacopo da Carrara resigning his command in Henry's favour. This resignation denied Cangrande his chief pretext for war but he was soon on the offensive again, taking castles from Henry of Gorizia in Trevisan territory in March and in June, with the aid of Paduan exiles, mounting an unsuccessful stealth attack on Padua itself.

In late Summer Henry III of Gorizia arrived once more in Padua with fresh troops and attacked Cangrande's camp at Bassanello on the morning of 25 August 1320. Cangrande, despite sustaining a slight wound and being advised by his generals to act defensively, charged the enemy forces. He found himself outnumbered and his subsequent retreat soon degenerated into the route of his entire army. Cangrande was again wounded, struck by an arrow in the thigh and had to ride desperately across country to the safety of his stronghold at Monselice which he eventually reached in a state of exhaustion with the arrow still sticking in his leg. Comprehensively defeated, he now had no choice but to open peace negotiations.

The Paduans, distrustful of their saviour Henry III of Gorizia and anxious to be rid of his unsavoury mercenary army, agreed to terms not so unfavourable to Cangrande as he might have feared. He only had to relinquish his recent conquests while his more long-standing possessions such as Este and Monselice were made subject to Frederick of Austria's arbitration.

For the next two years, Cangrande stayed clear of armed conflict but continued to expand his territories, winning the towns of Feltre (in February 1321), Serravalle (October 1321) and Belluno (in October 1322) by political means.

== Return to military action ==
In the autumn of 1322 Cangrande renewed his alliance with Passerino Bonacolsi in an attempt to restore Ghibelline exiles in Reggio Emilia. He pledged his allegiance to Louis IV of Bavaria after the latter's victory over Frederick I of Austria at the Battle of Mühldorf in September 1322 and in June 1323 formed an alliance with him, Passerino and the Estensi of Ferrara in aid of the Visconti of Milan. Aware that Padua sought to regain some of its former possessions by force he spent the spring of 1324 strengthening his defences, starting with the walls of Verona itself. However, the ill-disciplined mercenary army of Henry VI of Carinthia, Padua's current champion, did not pose a serious threat and Cangrande was soon able to pay him off. With Henry gone Cangrande attacked Padua again early in 1325 but Louis IV of Bavaria, the Emperor elect, ordered him to call a truce and restore some territories to Padua.

In June and July 1325 Cangrande fought at Modena in the Ghibelline cause but had to hurry to Vicenza as a great fire had destroyed a significant part of the city. He was taken ill on the way and retired to Verona where a rumour surfaced that he was dying. At this, his cousin Federico della Scala tried to seize power. but Cangrande's mercenaries held firm against him. On Cangrande's recovery, Federico, the saviour of Verona in a Paduan attack of June 1314, was banished from his territories.

== Intrigues and betrayals ==
Cangrande had recovered well enough to take part in the campaign which ended in a great victory over the Bolognese Guelphs at Monteveglio by Passerino Bonacolsi in November 1325. However, he seems to have become estranged from his old ally at this time, perhaps offended by Passerino favouring the Estensi of Ferrara into which family he had now married.

Despite the victory at Monteveglio and Castruccio Castracani's triumph over the Florentine Guelphs at Altopascio the Guelph faction was still strong and the pope and Robert of Naples sent envoys to Verona in July 1326 in an attempt to break Cangrande's allegiance to the Holy Roman Emperor Louis IV of Bavaria—however, when Louis entered Italy in January 1327, Cangrande was one of the first to pay him homage. He tried and failed to obtain the Vicariate of Padua from the Emperor but was reaffirmed as Imperial Vicar of Verona and Vicenza and made Imperial Vicar of Feltre, Monselice, Bassano and Conegliano.

On Whitsunday (31 May) Louis was crowned Holy Roman Emperor at Milan. Cangrande kept a lavish and ostentatious court in the city with a retinue of knights numbering over a thousand at the lowest estimate. If his aim was to impress the emperor of his superiority over the other Lombard magnates the most telling result was to arouse the jealousy and suspicion of Milan's rulers the Visconti and he soon found it prudent to return to Verona, where in June 1327 he involved himself in revisions to the city's legislature.

In August 1328 Cangrande supported a coup d'état in Mantua in which his old ally Passerino Bonacolsi was overthrown and killed and his family supplanted by the Gonzaga family. Whether Cangrande was merely being brutally pragmatic here and supporting the winning side—Passerino's power was on the wane having lost Modena in June 1327—or whether his estrangement from his old ally had a deeper cause, is uncertain.

== Final triumph over Padua ==
In September 1328 Cangrande at last took possession of Padua after 16 years of intermittent yet brutal conflict. The city was ripe for such a takeover, forsaken by its Imperial Vicar, Henry of Carinthia, and in a state of internal lawlessness as its most powerful autocrat Marsilio da Carrara struggled to control dissolute noblemen, not least members his own family. Meanwhile, Veronese forces under Cangrande's nephew Mastino della Scala in league with Paduan exiles, most prominent amongst them Nicolo da Carrara (a distant cousin of Marsilio) encamped not far away at Este posing a constant threat. Faced with these difficulties Marsilio eventually decided to surrender the city to Cangrande under an arrangement in which he retained some power rather than risk losing everything by fighting him or trying to do a deal behind his back with the exiles. Accordingly, Marsilio was made Captain General of the City by a compliant General Council but the overall ruler was now Cangrande, who rode triumphantly into Padua on 10 September 1328 Cangrande was received enthusiastically by the populace who now craved any kind of stability. To cement the new order Jacobo da Carrara's daughter Taddea was betrothed to Cangrande's nephew Mastino della Scala, the wedding itself taking place at a great Curia at Verona in November 1328.

This, Cangrande's most significant triumph, was seen as a huge boost for the Ghibelline cause, weakened as it had been by the death of Castruccio Castracani earlier that year. Even cities under Guelph control such as Florence wrote to congratulate Cangrande and, in March 1329 he was made a citizen of Venice, an honour rarely granted at the time to people from outside that city.

== Conquest of Treviso and death ==
In the spring of 1329, Cangrande succeeded in obtaining the title of Imperial Vicar of Mantua from the Emperor, intending to move against the ruling Gonzaga family in that city. These plans were put on hold however as a change of government at Treviso had produced a number of powerful exiles willing to help him conquer the city in exchange for their reinstatement. On 2 July 1329, Cangrande left Verona for the last time and within a few days his large army was laying siege to Treviso. Quickly running low on supplies and bereft of external help, the city's overlord Guecello Tempesta surrendered the city to Cangrande.

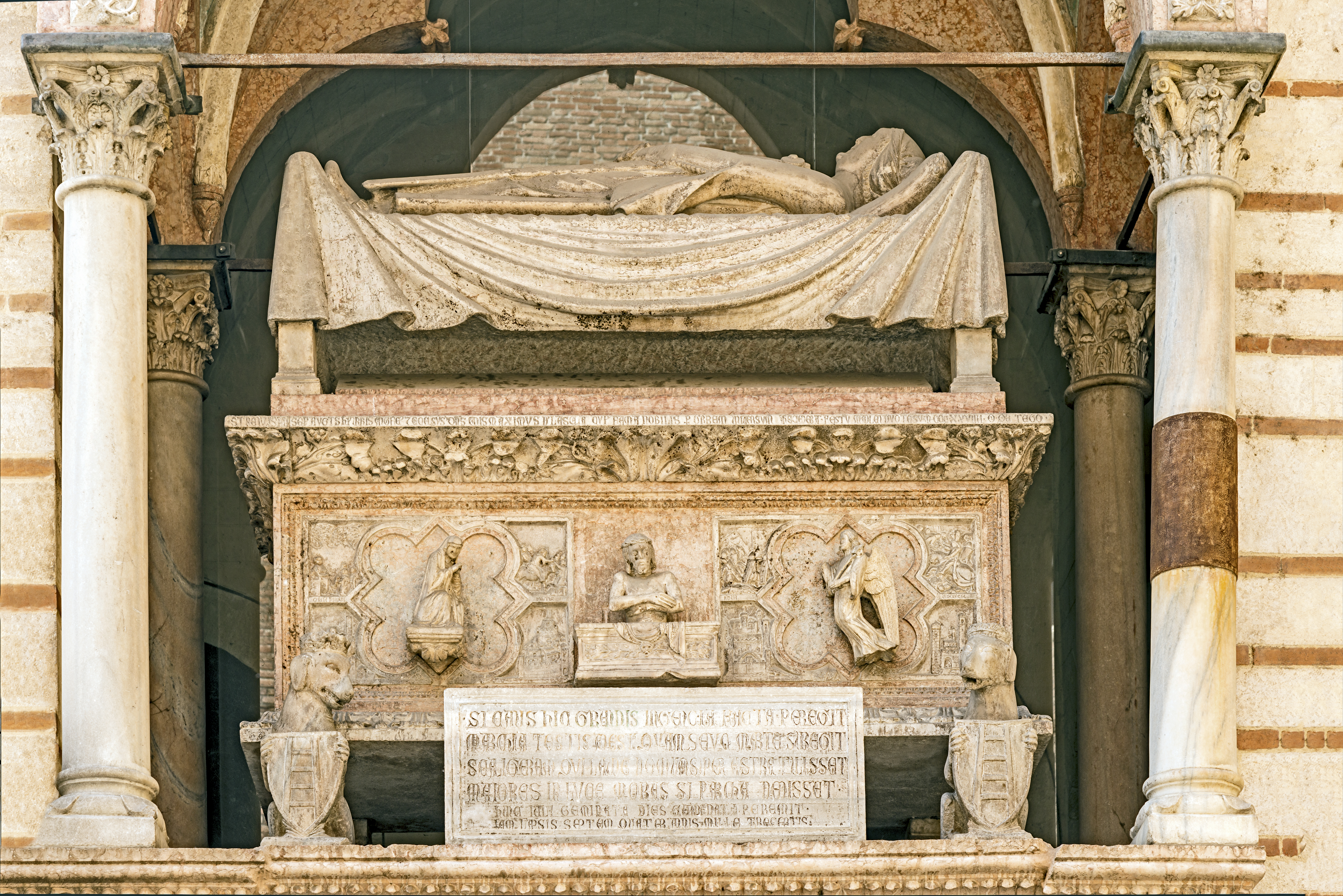
The Tomb of Cangrande

On 18 July, Cangrande made his state entry to Treviso, the crowning moment in his long struggle to subdue the cities of the Trevisan Mark. However, his triumph was marred, for he had become seriously ill as the result, according to contemporary accounts, of drinking from a polluted spring a few days before. As soon as he arrived at his lodgings he took to his bed and on the morning of 22 July 1329, after settling his affairs as best he could, he died. Cangrande's body was taken out of Treviso at nightfall and drawn on a bier to Verona where it was escorted by the nobles into the city preceded by twelve knights, one of whom wore Cangrande's armour and carried his unsheathed sword. The body was temporarily housed in the church of Santa Maria Antiqua, then appears to have been moved twice, once to a marble tomb in the churchyard (previously believed to be that of Cangrande's father Alberto I della Scala) and finally to the marble tomb over the church entrance, topped with an impressive equestrian statue of a smiling Cangrande in tournament attire (the latter now in the Museum of Castelvecchio). As he had no legitimate sons, his titles passed to his nephews, Mastino and Alberto della Scala.

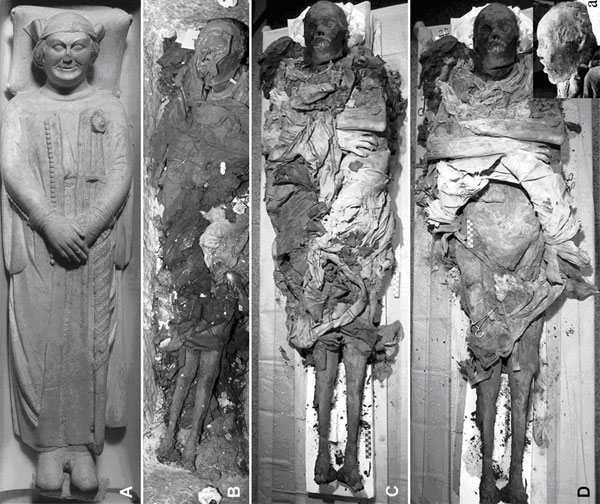
Views of Cangrande's body in his tomb

=== Modern postmortem ===
In February 2004, Cangrande's body was removed from its sarcophagus for scientific tests, one of the objectives being to see whether the cause of his death could be ascertained. The body was found to be naturally mummified and in an exceptionally good state of preservation, so much so that some of his internal organs could be examined. It transpired the actual cause of death was poisoning from lethal amounts of the drug digitalis, extracted from one of the "foxglove" family of plants. The evidence leans towards deliberate murder by poisoning, perhaps under the guise of medical treatment for the illness Cangrande is said to have contracted from drinking infected spring water prior to his arrival in Treviso. A physician of Cangrande's was hanged by his successor Mastino II, adding more weight to the possibility of foul play having been at least suspected, although who was ultimately behind the killing is likely to remain a mystery. One of the principal suspects (at least in terms of motive) was Cangrande's nephew, the ambitious Mastino II himself. Furthermore, according to the DNA examination carried out in 2021, Cangrande also suffered from a genetic metabolic myopathy, the Pompe disease.

== Legacy ==
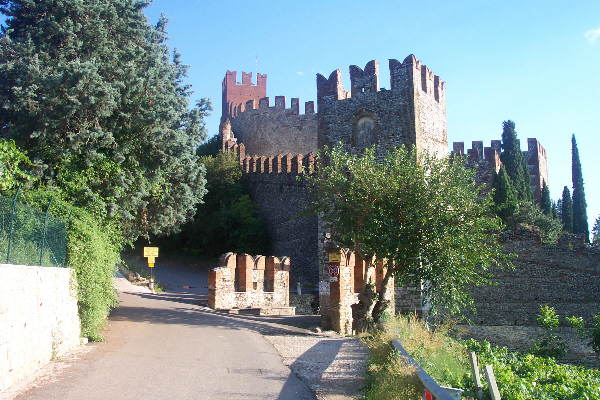
The castle at Soave, built by Cangrande

With the exception of Vicenza, Cangrande's military conquests did not survive the reign of his successor Mastino II. However, his victories did have far-reaching effects on neighbouring cities. For example, Vicenza's political future was now permanently linked to that of Verona. As well, he had played a decisive role in the rise to power of the Carraresi family in Padua. In Verona itself, he reformed and expanded the legislature, introducing few new laws and regulations but clearing up obscurities, omissions and inconsistencies in the existing manuscripts so efficiently that his statutes lasted with little significant alteration to the end of the Scaligeri period. The innovations he did make unsurprisingly tended to invest more power in his own position as absolute ruler. Despot though he was, Cangrande's rule was generally pragmatic and tolerant in marked contrast to Ezzelino III da Romano, the last warlord to hold comparable territories in eastern Lombardy. He normally allowed subject cities to keep their own laws and made efforts to ensure his appointed officials acted with impartiality and that taxation was kept to acceptable levels. Cangrande undertook few building projects of any significance with the exception of improvements to city walls and the erection of castles such as the example still to be seen at Soave.

As a military commander, Cangrande was a brilliant opportunist tactician rather than a great strategist. His bravery sometimes bordered on recklessness, usually leading his men from the front when attacking enemy troops or assaulting the walls of a fortress, although after his defeat by the Paduans in 1320 this boldness gave way to a more cautious approach. In weaving his way through the complex political scenarios of his time he showed energy and decisiveness similar to that on the battlefield. He had a reputation as a persuasive speaker and took many an opportunity to add to his territories by political means or win an influential ally to his cause.

=== Patron of the arts ===
Cangrande was a noted patron of the arts and learning in general. Poets, painters, grammarians and historians all found a welcome at Verona during his reign and his personal interest in eloquent debate is reflected by his addition of a professorship of Rhetoric to the six academic chairs already provided for in the Veronese statutes. However, his patronage of the poet Dante Alighieri is now undoubtedly his chief claim to fame as a patron of the arts. It is generally accepted that Dante was a guest at Verona between 1312 and 1318, although the details of his time in the city are unrecorded.

As might be expected, Dante is lavish in his praise of his patron wherever he has occasion to mention him, most notably in Paradiso, Canto XVII of the Divine Comedy, lines 70–93. These to some extent reflect Cangrande's fame in his own time when, as Dante remarked "even his enemies would be unable to keep silent about him". The comments of the historian A.M. Allen, written at the beginning of the 20th century, remain apposite: "whatever might be thought now of his land hunger, ostentation and imperious temper, to his contemporaries he appeared little short of perfect".

== In literature ==
Cangrande I della Scala appears in Giovanni Boccaccio's almost contemporary Decameron (1348-53), in the seventh tale of the first day, in which he is portrayed as a wise ruler, graceful enough to accept (and indeed reward) a veiled rebuke from Bergamino, a jester visiting his court. His eminence, wisdom and generosity in this moral tale (where he is compared not unfavourably to Emperor Frederick II) may reflect Dante's influence on Boccaccio's perception of Cangrande.

Cangrande is the title character of The Master of Verona, a novel by David Blixt. The story interweaves the characters of Shakespeare's Italian plays (most notably the Capulets and the Montagues from Romeo & Juliet) with the historical figures of Cangrande's time.

== Sources ==
- Allen, A. M. (1910). A History of Verona. London: Methuen & Co.
- Kohl, Benjamin G. (1998). Padua under the Carrara, 1318–1405. Baltimore and London: Johns Hopkins University Press. ISBN 0-8018-5703-1.
- Marini, Paolo; Ettore Napione; Gian Maria Varanini, eds. (2004). Cangrande Della Scala – La Morte e il corredo funebre di un principe nel medioevo. Venice: Marsilio Editori. ISBN 88-317-8492-7.
- Ettore Napione, ed. (2006). Il Corpo Del Principe – Richerche su Cangrande della Scala. Venice: Marsilio Editori. ISBN 88-317-9024-2.
- Varanini, Gian Maria (1988). Gli Scaligeri 1277–1387. Verona: Mondadori.

== See also ==
- Epistle to Cangrande

Regnal titles
Preceded by Alboino I	Lord of Verona; 1308–1329 with Alboino I (1308–1311)	Succeeded by Mastino II and Alberto II
New title	Lord of Vicenza; 1312–1329	Succeeded by Mastino II and Alberto II
Preceded by Marsilio da Carrara	Lord of Padua; 1328–1329	Succeeded by Mastino II and Alberto II
