= Alberto II della Scala =

Italian noble (1306–1352)

- Born: 1306
- Died: 13 September 1352 (aged 45–46)
- Noble family: Scaliger
- Father: Alboino I della Scala
- Mother: Beatrice da Correggio

Alberto II della Scala (1306 – September 1352) was lord of Verona from 1329 until his death. He was a member of the famous Scaliger family of northern Italy.

He was the son of Alboino I della Scala and Beatrice da Correggio. He co-ruled with his brother Mastino II until 1351. He lost Padua in 1338 and Belluno and Feltre in 1339.

After his death in Verona in 1352, he was succeeded by Mastino's sons.

Preceded by Cangrande I della Scala	Lord of Verona and Vicenza; With Mastino II (until 1351); 1329–1352	Succeeded by Cangrande II della Scala
Preceded by Cangrande I della Scala	Lord of Padua; With Mastino II; 1329–1337	Succeeded by Marsilio da Carrara
