= House of Montefeltro =

Italian noble family

- Country: County of Urbino; Duchy of Urbino; Papal States
- Founded: 11th century
- Founder: Antonio I da Montefeltro
- Final ruler: Guidobaldo da Montefeltro
- Titles: Duke of Urbino; Count of Urbino; Count of Montefeltro; Count of Montecopiolo; Count of Pietrarubbia; Count of Cantiano; Count of Mercatello; Count of Castel Durante; Lord of Urbino; Lord of Cantiano; Lord of Gubbio; Lord of Cagli; Lord of Frontone; Lord of Sassocorvaro
- Dissolution: 1508

The House of Montefeltro is a historical Italian family who ruled Urbino and Gubbio and became Dukes of Urbino in 1443. The family extinguished in the male line in 1508 and the duchy was inherited by the Della Rovere family.

== History ==
Coat of Arms of the Montefeltro family

Coat of arms of the Duchy of Urbino, with the Montefeltro arms, the imperial eagle and the papal Keys of Heaven

The family was a branch of the Lords of Carpegna, just like its longtime opponents, the House of Malatesta, the signori of Rimini. Around 1140, Antonio (d. 1184?), by distribution among heirs with his brothers, received the castle of Montecopiolo and later acquired the castle of San Leo (situated on the rock mons feretrius that gave its name to the region of Montefeltro).

Frederick I, Holy Roman Emperor, made Antonio imperial vicar for the town of Urbino in 1155, thus claiming it to be a fief of the Kingdom of Italy (Holy Roman Empire) although the Papal States had an older claim to it. Antonio's son, Montefeltrano I (c. 1135–1202), also vicar of Urbino, became count of Montefeltro. In 1226, the latter's sons Buonconte I and Taddeo da Montefeltro were appointed Counts of Urbino by emperor Frederick II. During the struggles between papal and imperial followers (Guelphs and Ghibellines), the Montefeltro brothers and their descendants became leaders of the Ghibellines of the Marche and the Romagna while the Malatesta family took the lead of the Guelphs.

Buonconte I was succeeded by Montefeltrano II (1214–1255), and Guido I (1255–1286 and 1293–1296), who was captain of Forlì during wars with the French and papal armies. Pope Boniface VIII absolved him from censures for his actions in those wars, and employed him against Palestrina and the Colonna.

Guido's successor, Federico I (1296–1322), increased his domains by taking Fano, Osimo, Recanati, Gubbio, Spoleto and Assisi from the Holy See. He was murdered after levying high taxes and Urbino fell under papal control. In 1323, however, Federico's son Nolfo (1323–1359) was proclaimed lord of Urbino. In 1355, as a papal legate, Cardinal Albornoz travelled through Italy restoring papal authority and Urbino once more came under the control of the Holy See. Nolfo's son, Federico II, was left without any authority, but his son, Antonio II (1377–1403), took advantage of the rebellion of the Marche and Umbria against the Holy See (1375) to restore his authority in Urbino.

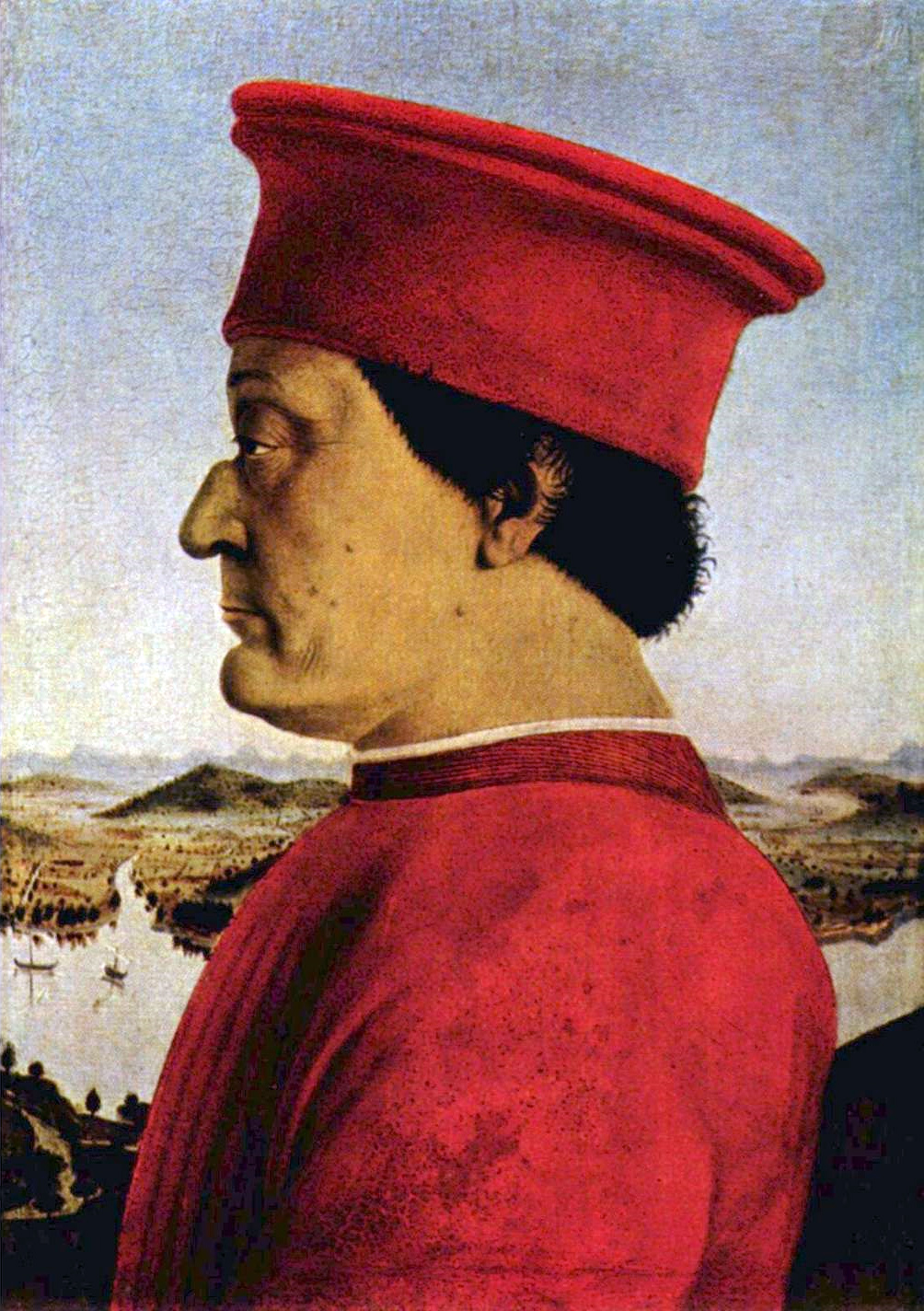
Portrait of Federico III da Montefeltro, by Piero della Francesca

Guidantonio (1403–1443) was appointed ruler of the Duchy of Spoleto by Pope Martin V (1419) and carried on war against Braccio da Montone with varying fortune. His son, Oddo Antonio, was assassinated after only a few months in power. The Urbinese then offered the lordship to Federico III (1444–1482), the illegitimate son of Guidantonio, a pupil of Vittorino da Feltre's school and a lover of art. Under him Urbino became a cultural center of the Renaissance. He was implicated in the wars against Sigismondo Pandolfo Malatesta, René of Anjou, and Florence. Pope Sixtus IV conferred on him the title of Duke of Urbino (1474).

Guidobaldo I (1492–1508) was forced to flee Urbino to escape the armies of Cesare Borgia. He adopted Francesco Maria della Rovere (1508–38), his sister's child, thus uniting the signoria of Sinigaglia with Urbino. He aided Julius II in reconquering the Romagna. Pope Leo X deprived him of his territory, which was given to Lorenzo de' Medici, and later to Francesco Maria della Rovere. The Rovere family ruled the duchy until its extinction in 1631, when it returned to the Papal States.

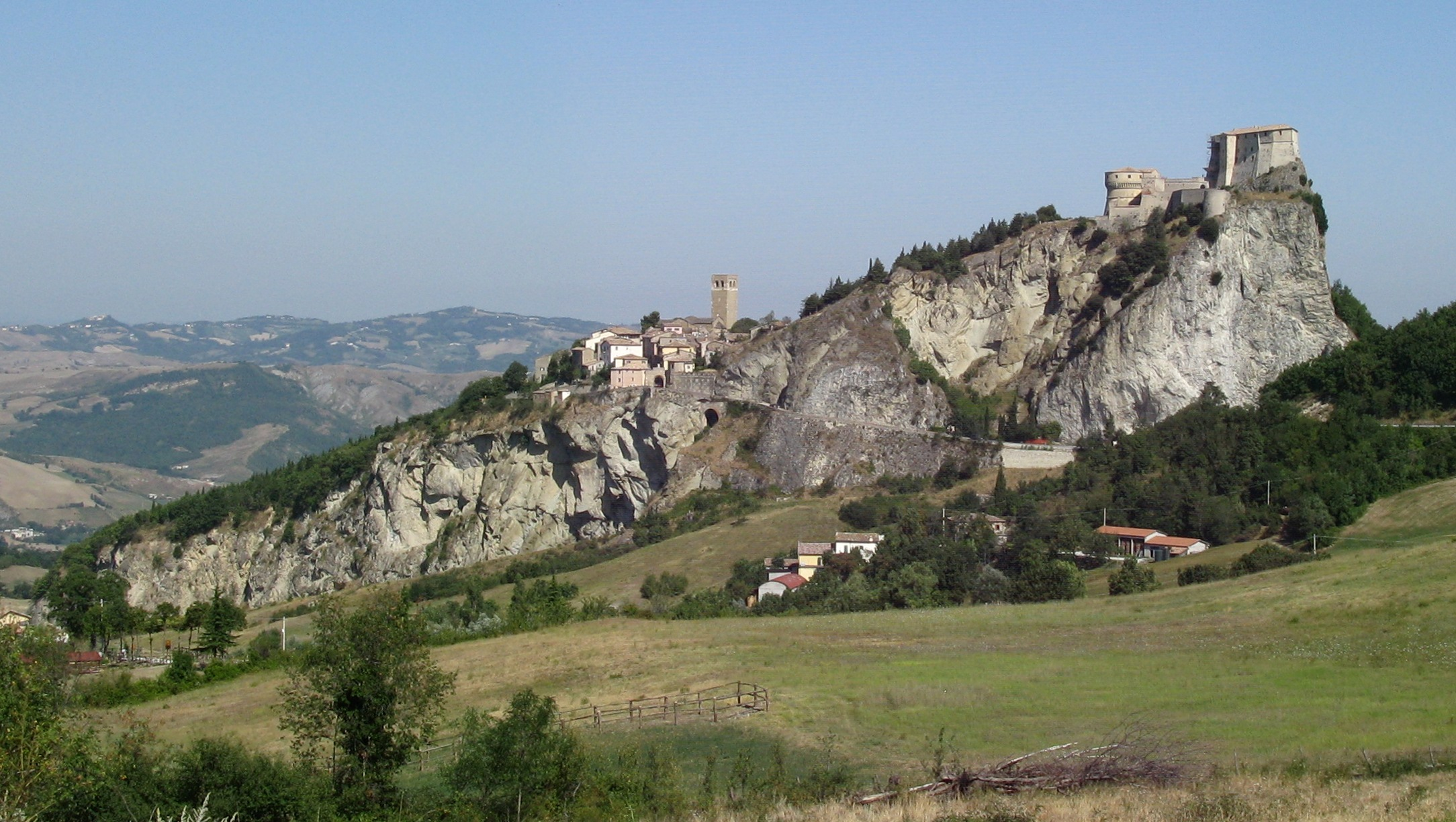
San Leo on the rock Mons Feretrius (Montefeltro)

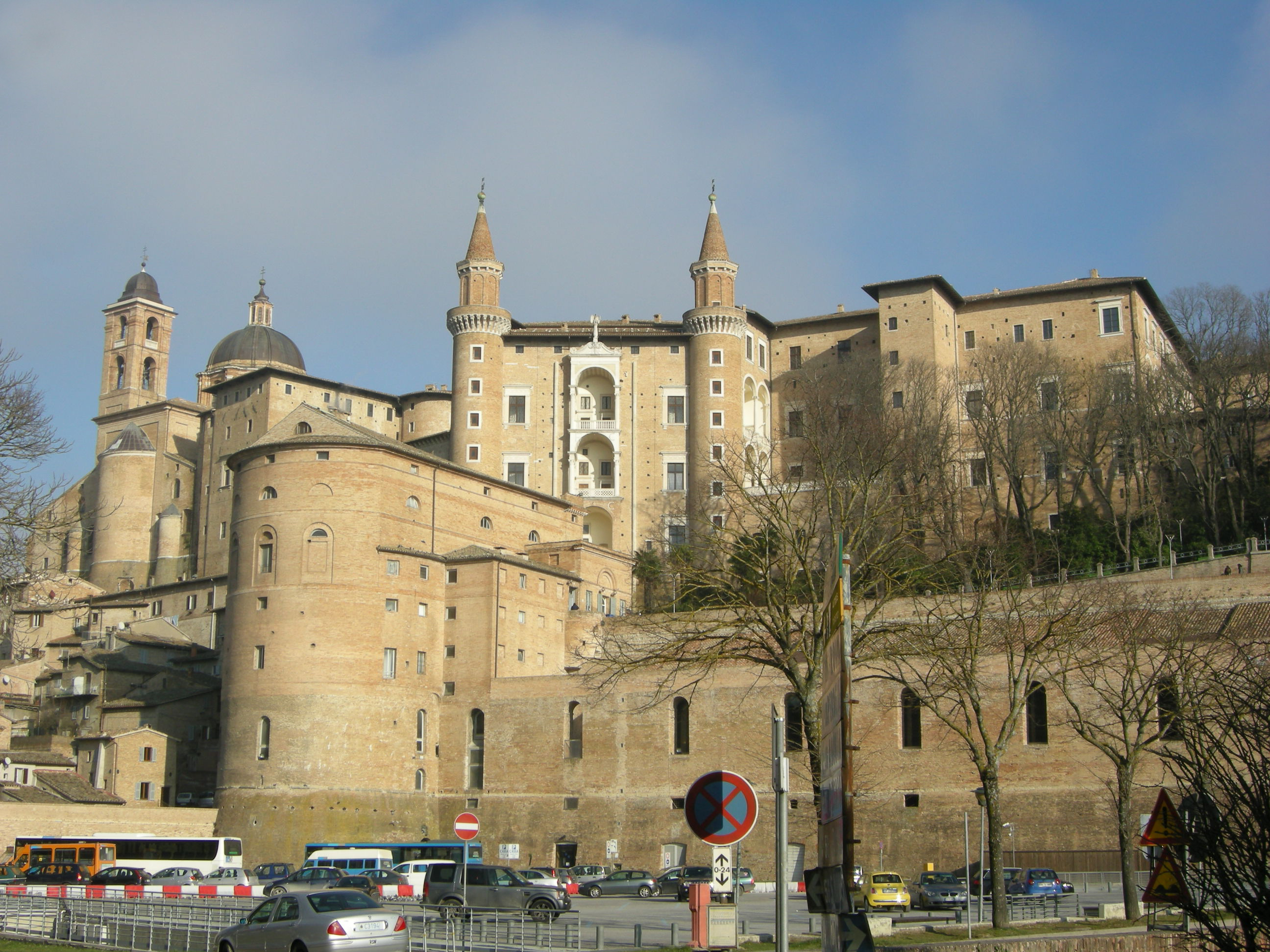
Palazzo Ducale, Urbino

== See also ==
- Lords of Urbino
- Della Rovere
