= List of Mantuan consorts =

== Lady of Mantua ==
=== House of Gonzaga, 1328–1433 ===
Picture	Name	Father	Birth	Marriage	Became Consort	Ceased to be Consort	Death	Spouse
	Caterina Malatesta	? (Malatesta)	-	-	-	-	-	Ludovico I Gonzaga
	Novella Malaspina	(Malaspina)	-	1340		18 January 1360 husband's death	-	Ludovico I Gonzaga
	Agnese Pico	Francesco Pico di Mirandola (Pico della Mirandola)	-	-	-	-	-	Guido Gonzaga
	Camilla Beccaria di Pavia	-	-	-	-	-	-	Guido Gonzaga
	Beatrice di Bari	Odoardo, Count of Bari (Scarpone)	-	-	-	-	-	Guido Gonzaga
	Alda d´Este	Obizzo III d'Este (Este)	18 July 1333	16 February 1356	22 September 1369 husband's accession	before 24 September 1381		Ludovico II Gonzaga
	Agnese Visconti	Bernabò Visconti (Visconti)	1362	25 December 1380	4 October 1382 husband's accession	1391		Francesco I Gonzaga
	Margherita Malatesta	Galeotto I Malatesta (Malatesta)	1370	1393		28 February 1399		Francesco I Gonzaga
	Paola Malatesta	Malatesta V Malatesta (Malatesta)	-	1409/10		22 September 1433; Became Marchioness	1449	Gianfrancesco I Gonzaga

== Marchioness of Mantua ==
=== House of Gonzaga, 1433–1530 ===
Picture	Name	Father	Birth	Marriage	Became Marchioness	Ceased to be Marchioness	Death	Spouse
	Paola Malatesta	Malatesta V Malatesta (Malatesta)	-	1409/10	22 September 1433; Lordship raised to Marquistate	23 September 1444 husband's death	1449	Gianfrancesco I Gonzaga
	Barbara of Brandenburg	John, Margrave of Brandenburg-Kulmbach (Hohenzollern)	1423	12 November 1433	23 September 1444 husband's accession	12 June 1478 husband's death	7 November 1481	Ludovico III Gonzaga
	Margaret of Bavaria	Albert III, Duke of Bavaria (Wittelsbach)	1 January 1442	10 May 1463	12 June 1478 husband's accession	14 October 1479		Federico I Gonzaga
	Isabella d'Este	Ercole I d'Este (Este)	18 May 1474	12 February 1490		29 March 1519 husband's death	13 February 1539	Francesco II Gonzaga
	Margaret Palaeologina	Guglielmo IX Paleologo (Paleologi)	11 August 1510	3 October 1531		25 March 1530; Became Duchess	28 December 1566	Federico II Gonzaga

== Duchess of Mantua ==
=== House of Gonzaga, 1530–1627 ===
Picture	Name	Father	Birth	Marriage	Became Duchess	Ceased to be Duchess	Death	Spouse
	Margaret Palaeologina	Guglielmo IX Paleologo (Paleologi)	11 August 1510	3 October 1531		28 August 1540 husband's death	28 December 1566	Federico II Gonzaga
	Catherine of Austria	Ferdinand I, Holy Roman Emperor (Habsburg)	15 September 1533	22 October 1549		22 February 1550 husband's death	28 February 1572	Francesco III Gonzaga
	Eleanor of Austria	Ferdinand I, Holy Roman Emperor (Habsburg)	2 November 1534	26 April 1561		14 August 1587 husband's death	5 August 1594	Guglielmo I Gonzaga
	Eleanor de' Medici	Francesco I de' Medici, Grand Duke of Tuscany (Medici)	28 February 1567	29 April 1584	14 August 1587 husband's accession	9 September 1611		Vincenzo I Gonzaga
	Margaret of Savoy	Charles Emmanuel I, Duke of Savoy (Savoy)	28 April 1589	19 February 1608	9 February 1612 husband's accession	22 December 1612 husband's death	26 June 1655	Francesco IV Gonzaga
	Caterina de' Medici	Francesco I de' Medici, Grand Duke of Tuscany (Medici)	2 May 1593	16 February 1617		29 October 1626 husband's death	17 April 1629	Ferdinando I Gonzaga
	Isabella Gonzaga	Alfonso Gonzaga, Marquess of Novellara (Gonzaga)	1576	1616/7	29 October 1626 husband's accession	? 1627		Vincenzo II Gonzaga

=== House of Gonzaga, Nevers line, 1627–1708 ===
Picture	Name	Father	Birth	Marriage	Became Duchess	Ceased to be Duchess	Death	Spouse
	Isabella Clara of Austria	Leopold V, Archduke of Austria (Habsburg)	12 August 1629	7 November 1649		14 August 1665 husband's death	24 February 1685	Charles II Gonzaga
	Anna Isabella Gonzaga	Ferrante III Gonzaga, Duke of Guastalla (Gonzaga)	12 February 1655	1670		11 August 1703		Charles III Gonzaga
	Suzanne Henrietta of Lorraine	Charles III, Duke of Elbeuf (Guise)	1 February 1686	8 November 1704		before 5 July 1708; Conquest by Austria	19 December 1710	Charles III Gonzaga

== See also ==
- List of consorts of Montferrat
