= Margherita Malatesta =

Italian noblewoman (1370–1399)

- Consort of the ruler of Mantua
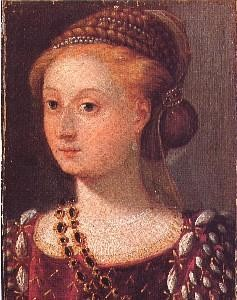

- Coat of arms
- Reign: 1393-1399
- Predecessor: Agnese Visconti
- Successor: Paola Malatesta
- Born: 1370
- Died: February 28, 1399; Mantua
- Buried: Church of San Francesco (Mantua)
- Noble family: House of Malatesta
- Spouse: Francesco I Gonzaga
- Issue: Gianfrancesco; Susanna
- Father: Galeotto I Malatesta
- Mother: Elisabetta da Varano

Margherita Malatesta of the House of Malatesta (1370 – 28 February 1399) was the wife of Francesco I Gonzaga of the powerful House of Gonzaga, the ruler of Mantua in the north of the Italian peninsula, whom she married in 1393. She acted as regent during the absence of her spouse in 1398-1399.

== Life ==
She and her spouse were already related by marriage through the marriage of his sister Elisabetta to her brother Carlo. Francesco's first wife Agnese Visconti had been executed for infidelity in 1391. Margherita and Francesco I were the parents of Gianfrancesco I the first Marquis of Mantua. Gianfrancesco married Paola Malatesta, daughter of Malatesta IV, in 1409.

The network of related women Margherita Malatesta, Alda d'Este, and Elisabetta and Margherita Gonzaga are considered to have tied together the courts of Mantua, Ferrara, Rimini and Pesaro. The Gonzaga family struck medals of Margherita. Margherita brought the hereditary disease of rickets to the Gonzagas, which manifested itself periodically in the lords of Mantua until the 16th century. She died on February 28, 1399, and was interred in the church of San Francesco in Mantua, in the mausoleum of the Gonzagas.

== Issue ==
Francesco and Margherita had two children:

- Gianfrancesco (1395–1444), his successor and the marquis of Mantua
- Susanna, who died young

== Gallery ==
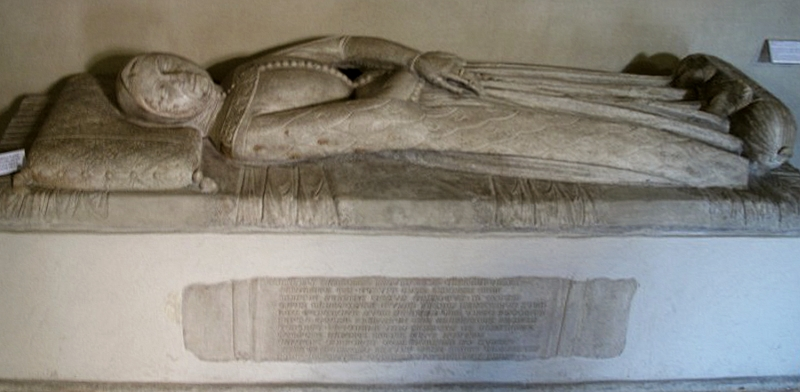
Mantua, Palazzo Ducale, tomb effigy of Margherita Malatesta

== Bibliography ==
- Adelaide, Murgia (1972). I Gonzaga. Milan: Mondadori.
- Giancarlo, Malacarne (2010). Gonzaga, Genealogie di una dinastia. Modena.
- Litta Biumi, Pompeo. Famiglie celebri italiane (in Italian). Milano: Luciano Basadonna Editore.
- Giuseppe Amadei; Ercolano Marani, eds. (1980). I ritratti gonzagheschi della collezione di Ambras. Mantua.
