= Carlo I Malatesta =

Italian mercenary captain

Carlo I Malatesta (June 1368 – 13 September 1429) (also Carlo of Rimini) was an Italian condottiero during the Wars in Lombardy and lord of Rimini, Fano, Cesena and Pesaro. He was a member of the powerful House of Malatesta. Carlo's wife was Elisabetta Gonzaga; they were married in November 1386. Francesco I Gonzaga married Carlo's sister Margherita Malatesta in 1393, cementing ties between the families. Carlo was the brother of Pandolfo III and Andrea Malatesta, with whom he fought in numerous occasions.

Carlo I Malatesta was one of the most respected condottieri of the time; he enlarged the Riminese possessions and restored the port.

== Life ==
Carlo Malatesta was the son of the condottiero Galeotto I Malatesta and Elisabetta da Varano, daughter of the condottierio Rodolfo II da Varano.

After Galeotto's death in 1385, the Malatesta lands were divided among his four sons. Carlo inherited Rimini. In 1385 he was named vicar for Romagna by the Pope Urban VI and, two years later, Gonfalonier.

In 1390 he defeated a Bolognese corps led by Alberico da Barbiano. In his early years he fought mainly against the Montefeltro family, but later allied with them through a double marriage arrangement. In 1394, he was placed in charge of Rocca Contrada, a town important in the local balance of power, located at the border of the Marca di Ancona, Umbria, and the Duchy of Urbino. That same year, he and his youngest brother Galleotto received Bertinoro as security for a loan made to the papacy.

Formerly aligned with the Visconti, the marriage of his sister Margherita drew him closer to the Gonzagas. In 1397 in the war between the Visconti and the Gonzaga of Mantua, he defeated the Visconti leader Jacopo Dal Verme at Governolo, but when Giovanni da Barbiano and others refused to advance against Brescia, he retired in disgust to Romagna. In 1398, he successfully arbitrated a truce between the parties.

Malatesta resumed service with the papacy, and in 1402 led an allied force including his brother Andrea of Cesena, the Florentines, a number of lords of the papal states and the troops of the papal legate Baldassarre Cossa against Milan. He then negotiated a settlement with Francesco Gonzaga as representative of the Duchess of Milan, by which Bologna, Perugia, and Assisi were returned to the papacy. Pope Boniface IX, not wishing to prolong an expensive conflict, later accepted the terms, despite opposition from both Florence and Bologna.

In 1406 he was named governor of Milan. From 1409 Carlo fought constantly for the Papal States, not only as Captain General of the Church but also as diplomat. In the chaotic situation created by the presence of three popes at the same time, he backed Gregory XII, whom he also housed at Rimini, until his abdication at the Council of Constance. The resignation letter was read by Carlo himself.

After his brother-in-law's (Francesco I Gonzaga) death in 1407, Carlo protected Francesco's young son Gianfrancesco I Gonzaga, his nephew through his sister Margherita. Gianfrancesco would become the first Marquis of Mantua.

In 1412 he became capitano generale (commander-in-chief) of the Venetian army, fighting against the Hungarian invasion of King Sigismund. However, he was wounded in action at the Battle of Motta, and had to cede his position to his brother Pandolfo.

On 12 July 1416 Malatesta was defeated by Braccio da Montone at the Battle of Sant'Egidio, wounded and taken prisoner. Pandolfo paid 80,000 ducati as ransom. Later, his territories were invaded by the Visconti army. Carlo lost Forlì and Gradara, and was subsequently defeated at Zagonara. Again taken prisoner, he was housed as a guest by the Duke of Milan Filippo Maria, and later freed without harm.

The Carlo Malatesta who married Vittoria Colonna, niece of Pope Martin V, was the son of Malatesta dei Sonetti who was lord of Pesaro. Guillaume Du Fay's ballade "Resvellies Vous" (Awake and be merry) was written for the marriage of this younger Carlo in 1423. Carlo Malatesta of Rimini provided the newlyweds with a "most sumptuous nozze" in Rimini.

Malatesta died in 1429, having obtained by Pope Martin V the legitimation of his sons, who inherited the seigniories of Rimini and Fano, while the sons of Malatesta dei Sonetti received Pesaro and his nephew Domenico received Cesena.

== Sources ==
- Rendina, Claudio (1992). I capitani di ventura. Rome: Newton Compton.

Preceded by Galeotto I Malatesta	Lord of Rimini; 1385–1429	Succeeded by Galeotto Roberto Malatesta
Preceded by Andrea Malatesta	Lord of Cesena; 1417–1429	Succeeded by Domenico Malatesta
