= Antonio II da Montefeltro =

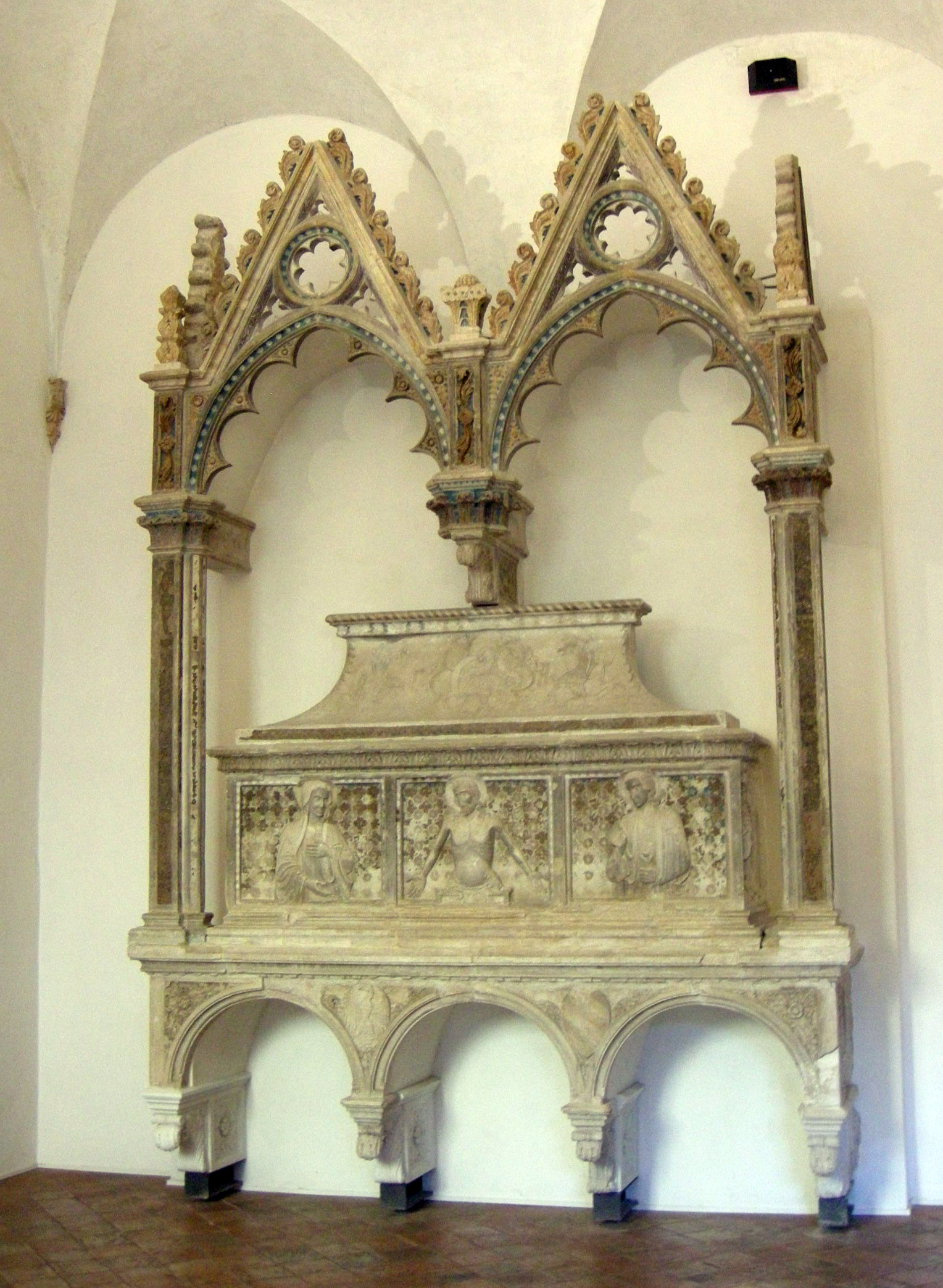
Tomb of Montefeltro

Antonio II da Montefeltro (1348–1404) was an Italian condottiero and count of Urbino.

Born at Urbino, he was a grandson to count Nolfo da Montefeltro and the son to Federico II da Montefeltro. He occupied Urbino in 1375 and also owned Cagli. He allied himself with Florence and the Visconti Family in Milan. After Gabrielli of Gubbio unsuccessfully plotted against him, he obtained the lordship of that city, being confirmed as its Papal vicar by Benedict IX.

In 1391, while warring against the Malatesta, Antonio captured the castle of Sassoferrato and Cantiano. He had his son Guidantonio married with Ringarda Malatesta and her daughter Gentile to the lord of Faenza. He died in 1404, after fleeing Urbino during a plague.

Antonio's daughter Battista married Galeazzo Malatesta in 1405.

== Sources ==
- Franceschini, G. (1970). I Montefeltro (in Italian). Varese.

Preceded by Federico II	Count of Urbino; 1363–1404 (under Papal control from 1369 to 1375)	Succeeded by Guidantonio
