= Federico II =

Federico II may refer to:

- Frederick II, Holy Roman Emperor (1194–1250)
- Federico II da Montefeltro (died c. 1370)
- Frederick II of Saluzzo (died in 1396)
- Federico II, Duke of Mantua (1500–1540)
