= Gianfrancesco I Gonzaga of Mantua =

Ruler of Mantua

Gianfrancesco I Gonzaga
- Marquis of Mantua
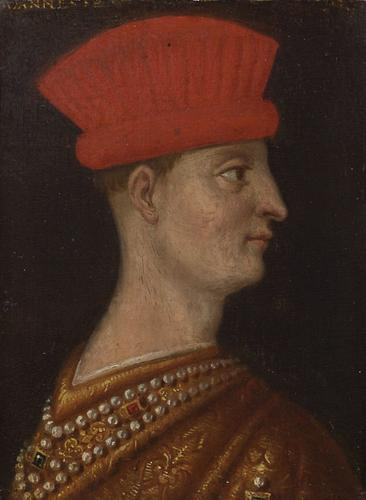
- Portrait of Francesco I Gonzaga, Ambras castle collection, Innsbruck, Austria
- Born: 1395
- Died: 23 September 1444; Mantua, Margravate of Mantua
- Noble family: House of Gonzaga
- Spouse: Paola Malatesta
- Issue: Ludovico III; Cecilia Gonzaga; Carlo Gonzaga
- Father: Francesco I Gonzaga
- Mother: Margherita Malatesta

Gianfrancesco I Gonzaga (1395 – 23 September 1444) was Captain of the People from 1407 to 1433 and Marquis of Mantua from 1433 to 1444. He was also a condottiere.

== Biography ==
Gianfrancesco was the son of Francesco I Gonzaga and Margherita Malatesta. He inherited the rule of Mantua in 1407, when he was 12. In his first years, he was under the patronage of his uncle Carlo Malatesta and, indirectly, of the Republic of Venice. In 1409 he married Paola Malatesta, daughter of Malatesta IV Malatesta of Pesaro, by whom he had eight children. These included Ludovico, who succeeded him as marquis of Mantua, Carlo, Margherita and Cecilia, a nun and scholar. Gianfrancesco was the first Gonzaga to bear the title of marquis, which he obtained from Emperor Sigismund on 22 September 1433.

He fought for the Papal States and the Malatestas in 1412 and 1417, respectively, and was capitano generale (commander-in-chief) of the Venetian Armies from 1434. Later he left the alliance with Venice and entered at the service of the Visconti of Milan, starting an unsuccessful war against Venice which caused the loss of several Mantuan territories.

During his reign the famous humanist Vittorino da Feltre was invited to Mantua, as well as numerous artists like Pisanello and others, starting the traditional role of the city as a capital of Italian Renaissance. He founded the first workshop in Italy for the manufacture of tapestries. Cecilia Gonzaga, his daughter, was a humanist and scholar who received instruction from Vittorino. He pushed for his daughter to marry Oddantonio da Montefeltro, the first duke of Urbino, but renounced the arrangement later when the Duke turned out to be a cruel ruler.

== Sources ==
- Brinton, Selwyn (1927). The Gonzaga - Lords of Mantua. Methuen & Co. Ltd.
- Brown, Alison (1988). The Renaissance. Routledge.74
- Campbell, Thomas P. (2002). Tapestry in the Renaissance: Art and Magnificence. The Metropolitan Museum of Art.
- Fletcher, Stella (2013). The Longman Companion to Renaissance Europe, 1390-1530. Routledge.
- Wilson, Katharina M.; Margolis, Nadia, eds. (2004). "Gonzaga, Cecilia". Women in the Middle Ages. Greenwoods Press.
- Woodward, William Harrison (1996). Vittorino Da Feltre and Other Humanist Educators. University of Toronto Press.

== See also ==
- Wars in Lombardy

Gianfrancesco I Gonzaga of Mantua Gonzaga family Born: 1395 Died: 23 September 1444
Preceded by Francesco I	Lord of Mantua; 1407–1433	Became Marquis
New title	Marquis of Mantua; 1433–1444	Succeeded by Ludovico III
