= Guido da Montefeltro =

Guido da Montefeltro may refer to:

- Guido I da Montefeltro (died 1298), lord of Urbino mentioned in the Divine Comedy
- Guido II da Montefeltro (fl. 1322–1341), count of Urbino and condottiero
