= Bonconte da Montefeltro, Count of Urbino =

Bonconte da Montefeltro (c. 1170 – 1241/2) was an imperial Italian nobleman and the second documented person of the House of Montefeltro.

Bonconte was born around 1170. He was a son of Montefeltrano I and a brother of Taddeo I. A document of 1203 contains the earliest reference to "the sons of Montefeltrano", without naming them. The first document that refers to Bonconte by name is the privilege issued by Emperor Otto IV on 20 January 1210 naming Azzo VI d'Este to the March of Ancona. It is possible that Bonconte and his brother were made counts of Montefeltro by the emperor later that year, but if so this was not recognized by Otto's rival, Frederick II, who granted the county to the archbishopric of Ravenna in 1220, the archbishop in turn confiding it in the bishops of Montefeltro. The Rolando who became bishop in 1222 was possibly Bonconte and Taddeo's brother.

On 31 January 1226, Frederick appointed Bonconte and Taddeo counts of Urbino with the agreement of Pope Honorius III. Bonconte did homage to Frederick II and was probably recognized as count of Montefeltro alongside his brother (count since 1223). That same year (1226), Bonconte attended an imperial diet in Ravenna and joined the emperor's army with his own forces, albeit "unwillingly", according to the Chronicon Faventinum. In 1228, Bonconte's son Ugolino became bishop of Montefeltro.

The comment of the Chronicon Faventinum notwithstanding, Bonconte appears as a staunch supporter of the empire who received imperial support in turn. It took until 1233–1234 for Urbino to accept its new counts, largely through the work of the imperial rector in Romagna, Carnelevario da Pavia, and the people of Rimini, of which the counts were citizens. In 1235–1236, Bonconte gave help to Ravenna against the city of Faenza, a member of the anti-imperial Lombard League. Throughout the 1230s, he was repeatedly elected podestà of Città di Castello in an evident attempt to become its de facto lord. On 9 February 1240, Frederick II authorized him to pacify the area between Città di Castello and Gubbio in the name of the empire and reappointed him podestà. On 7 December, Bonconte was present at the siege of Faenza.

Bonconte was alive on 15 June 1241, still podestà of Città di Castello. He died later that year or early in the next. His descendants remained loyal Ghibellines (imperialists) while those of his brother became Guelphs (papalists). He had at least five sons:

- Montefeltrano II, his successor as count
- Cavalca
- Ugolino, bishop of Montefeltro
- Gigliolo
- Taddeo, who became a Franciscan, according to Salimbene de Adam

== Bibliography ==
- Carpegna Falconieri, Tommaso di (2012). "Montefeltro, Buonconte di". Dizionario Biografico degli Italiani (in Italian). Vol. 76: Montauti–Morlaiter. Rome: Istituto dell'Enciclopedia Italiana. ISBN 978-88-12-00032-6.
- Osborne, June (2003). Urbino: The Story of a Renaissance City. Frances Lincoln.
