= Malatesta IV Malatesta =

Italian condottiero, poet, and lord of Pesaro (1370–1429)

Malatesta dei Sonetti
- Lord of Pesaro, Fossombrone, Gradara, Jesi, Narni
- Born: 1370
- Died: 19 December 1429 (aged 58–59)
- Noble family: Malatesta
- Spouse: Elisabetta da Varano
- Issue: Galeazzo Malatesta; Carlo II Malatesta; Galeotto; Paola Malatesta; Pandolfo; Cleofa Malatesta; Taddea
- Father: Pandolfo II Malatesta
- Mother: Paola Orsini

Malatesta IV (or III) Malatesta (also known as Malatesta dei Sonetti; 1370 – 19 December 1429) was an Italian condottiero, poet and lord of Pesaro, Fossombrone, Gradara, Jesi, Narni and other fiefs in Italy.

== Biography ==
Born in Pesaro, he was the only son of Pandolfo II Malatesta and his second wife Paola Orsini. He was given the nickname "dei sonetti" ("of the Sonnets") due to his love for literature and fine arts. He married Elisabetta da Varano, who gave him seven children : Galeazzo, Carlo, Galeotto, Paola, Pandolfo, Cleofa and Taddea.

He became lord of Pesaro in 1385. He was hired by pope Urban VI to fight against antipope Clement VII. In 1390 he fought against the Bolognesi led by Giovanni da Barbiano and later was hired by Republic of Florence against the Visconti of Milan. In 1392 he was excommunicated by the pope for having conquered Todi, namely a Papal possession.

In 1394 he served antipope Benedict XIII, who named him captain general of Bologna, to fight against pope Boniface VIII. During the conflict, he destroyed several towns in Umbria and the Latium, and took control of Narni and Orte for himself as podestà. Later he made peace with Boniface. In 1404 Malatesta was hired by the Republic of Venice, which assigned him some 20,000 troops to fight against the Carraresi of Padua. However, the Venetian troops were defeated and returned to Pesaro in late 1404, after which he made a pilgrimage to Santiago de Compostela.

Once freed, he sided for antipope Alexander V who, in 1409, ordered him to fight in Tuscany along the Florentines against the forces of Ladislaus of Naples. The conflict lasted until 1412: Malatesta again made peace with the pope, and thenceforth warred against antipope John XXIII. In 1415 he defended his Umbrian fiefs from Braccio da Montone. In 1416-1417 Malatesta was involved in the war for Jesi, which depleted his treasury.

In 1423 he was hired by Florence in the war against Milan. In 1424, in the battle of Zagonara, his cousin Carlo was taken prisoner; the same fate struck his sons Galeazzo and Carlo after they were besieged in Gradara by Angelo della Pergola. The following year Malatesta signed a treaty of peace at Abbiategrasso.

He retired at Gradara, where he died in 1429. As a patron of the arts, he had housed in Persaro figures such as Francesco Casini and the painter Mariotto di Nardo, and was in correspondence with humanists Coluccio Salutati and his daughter-in-law, Battista Malatesta. Malatesta was also the author of poems, collected in a Canzoniere, influenced by Petrarch and the contemporary Tuscan literature.

== Sources ==
- Franceschini, G. (1973). I Malatesta. Milan: Dall'Oglio.

Preceded by Galeotto Malatesta (tutor)	Lord of Pesaro; 1381–1429	Succeeded by Alessandro Sforza
