= Galeazzo Malatesta =

Italian condottiero and lord (1385–1461)

Galeazzo Malatesta (1385–1461) was an Italian condottiero and lord of Pesaro and Fossombrone.

He was the elder son of Malatesta IV Malatesta and Elisabetta da Varano. In 1405 he married Battista da Montefeltro. He was nicknamed "the inept" due to his lack of courage and, differently from most of the male members of the family, he did not prove skilled in the art of war.

In 1413, together with his father, he took part in the failed attack to Capodimonte, near Ancona. In 1416 he was at the battle of Sant'Egidio, collaborating with his cousin Carlo I Malatesta. They were both taken as prisoners. Freed, Galeazzo followed his cousin in other battles until 1429, the year of the deaths of both his father and Carlo I. Galeazzo subsequently became lord of Pesaro. In 1430 he supported a rebellion against his kinsman, Sigismondo Pandolfo Malatesta. In 1431 he was ousted from Pesaro together with his brother Carlo, due to his poor government, and took refuge in Venice. After a series of battles against the Papal States, he was able to return in Pesaro in 1433.

In 1433 he hired Federico III da Montefeltro to defend Pesaro and Fossombrone against his cousin Sigismondo Pandolfo from Rimini. Although he was able to keep his territories, and overwhelmed by the debts made to hire other condottieri, in 1444 he sold Pesaro to Alessandro Sforza in exchange of 20,000 florins. Two years later he gave Fossombrone to Federico da Montefeltro, for 13,000 florins. This caused the Pope to excommunicate him, since he had sold two towns which were nominally under papal rule.

In 1448 he made peace with his cousins, Sigismondo Pandolfo and Domenico Malatesta, who pushed him to attack Pesaro. However, Galeazzo's attempt was thwarted by the intervention of Florence. He later lived in Florence, where he died in 1461.

== Sources ==
- Franceschini, G. (1973). I Malatesta. Milan: Dall'Oglio.

Preceded by Malatesta IV Malatesta	Lord of Pesaro; 1429–1444	Succeeded by Alessandro Sforza
