= Battista Malatesta =

Italian Renaissance poet

Battista Malatesta (c. 1384 – 1448), also known as Battista di Montefeltro, forename also called Baptista, was an Italian Renaissance poet.

== Life ==
Baptista Malatesta was the daughter of Antonio II da Montefeltro, Count of Urbino, and the granddaughter of Federico II da Montefeltro. On 14 June 1405 she married Galeazzo Malatesta, the heir to the lordship of Pesaro. Galeazzo came to power in 1429 but was so hated as a ruler that, after two years of power in 1431, he was driven from his city. His wife then returned to her old home at Urbino. She lived for some twenty years a widowed and secluded life. She died, as a Sister of the Franciscan Order of Santa Chiara, in 1448.

== De studiis et litteris ==
She was a learned woman of the aristocracy who was educated in philosophy and languages, and was a poet and orator. She corresponded with other scholars of her time such as Leonardo Bruni. Bruni's letter to Baptista Malatesta of Montefeltro, entitled De studiis et litteris, was written in 1424. In it, Bruni describes a course of study suitable for women, illustrating the belief, early on held by humanists, that classical studies are "worthy to be pursued by men and women alike." De studiis et litteris is the earliest known example of a humanist inter-gender dialogue about women's education.

The Emperor Sigismund, when passing through Urbino in 1433, was greeted by her in a Latin oration, which half a century later was still thought worthy of print.
