= Carlo II Malatesta =

Italian politician and condottiero (d. 1438)

Carlo II Malatesta (c. 1390 – 14 November 1438) was an Italian politician and condottiero. He was lord of Pesaro, Gradara, Senigallia, Fossombrone and Civitanova Marche. He was the son of Malatesta IV Malatesta and Elisabetta da Varano.

== Life ==
In 1409 he followed his father to Florence to fight against the King of Naples's army. In 1421 he fought for the Papal States against Perugia and for a short time for the Florentines against Milan. He and his brother Galeazzo were captured at Gradara in 1424 after their father's and their cousin Carlo's defeat at Zagonara by the Visconti. Carlo joined the Visconti army and in 1426 fought in Romagna against the Anti-Visconti League.

In 1427 he was made captain general of the Visconti armies, putting him in command of 1,200 cavalry in the battle against Francesco Bussone. The Visconti force was defeated at Pizzighettone and Carlo was captured again until being freed when the two sides made peace. In 1428 Carlo married Vittoria Colonna, Pope Martin V's niece, but the couple remained childless. In 1430 he fought against Rimini but was defeated and fled from Sigismondo Pandolfo Malatesta. Shortly afterwards he defended Bologna against an attack by Anton Galeazzo Bentivoglio.

In 1431 a revolt broke out in Pesaro, forcing Carlo to retreat to Fossombrone then to Gradara and elsewhere. In 1433 he helped the Montefeltro and the Visconti reconquer their own lands. The resulting treaty brought peace between the Papal States and the two Malatesta brothers, Carlo and Galeazzo. Carlo returned to Pesaro on 24 September and killed all those who had revolted two years earlier.

== Bibliography ==
- E. Angiolini and A. Falcioni - La signoria di Malatesta dei Sonetti Malatesti (1391-1429) - Rimini, Ghigi, 2002, ISBN
- G. Franceschini - I Malatesta - Milano, Dall'Oglio, 1973.
- A. F. Massera - Note Malatestiane - Galileiana, Firenze, 1911.
- L. Tonini - Rimini nella signoria de' Malatesti: parte prima che comprende il secolo XIV, Vol.1 - Rimini, Albertini, 1880.
- M.R. Valazzi - Pesaro tra Medioevo e Rinascimento - Venezia, Marsilio, 1990, ISBN 8831750909.
