= Paola Malatesta =

Italian noblewoman

Paola Agnese Malatesta
- Marquesa of Mantua
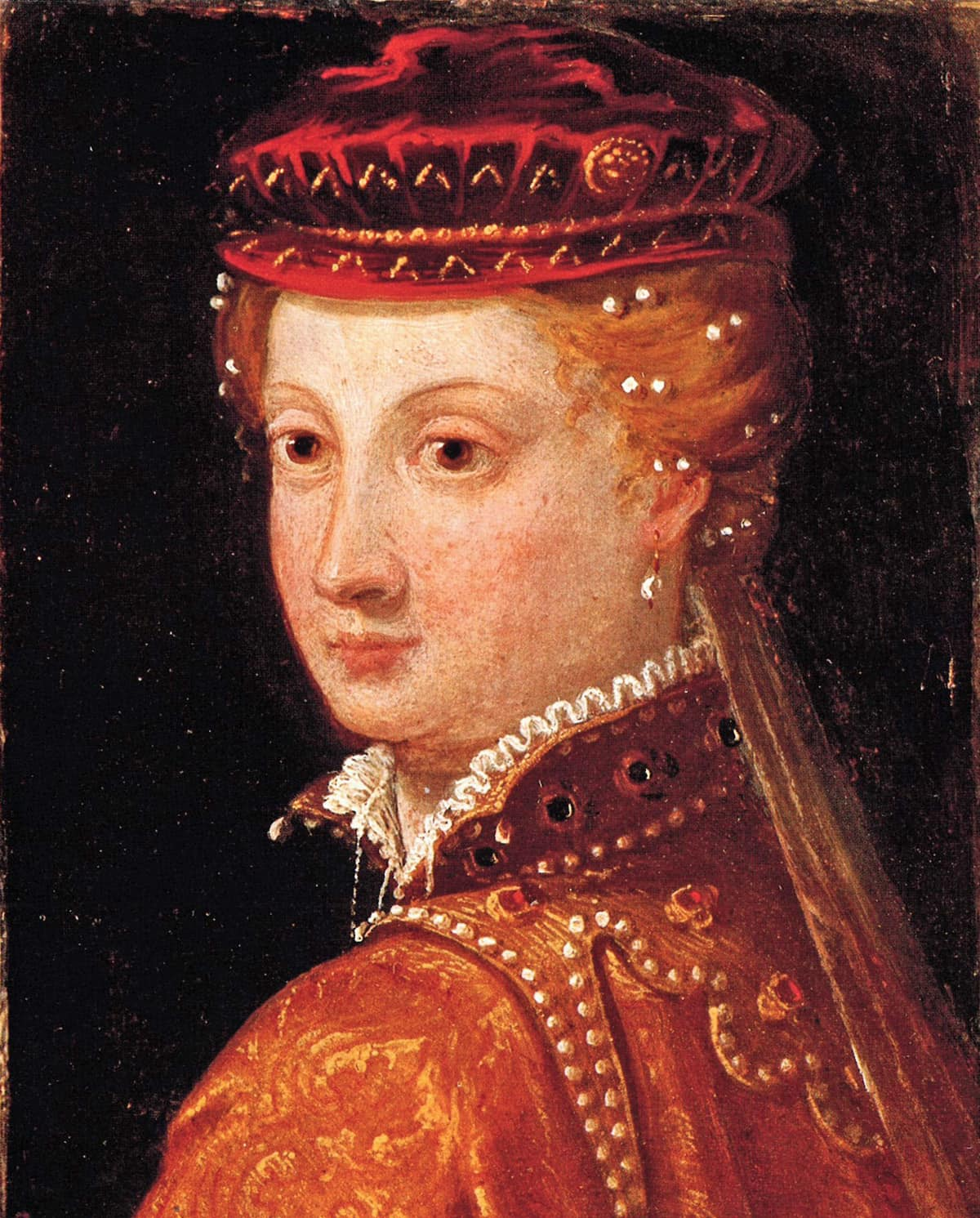

- Coat of arms
- Reign: 1409 - 25 September 1444
- Predecessor: Margherita Malatesta
- Successor: Barbara of Brandenburg
- Born: 1393; Pesaro
- Died: February 28, 1449; Mantua
- Noble family: Malatesta
- Spouse: Gianfrancesco
- Issue: Cecilia Gonzaga; Ludovico III Gonzaga, Marquis of Mantua; Margherita Gonzaga, Marquise of Ferrara
- Father: Malatesta IV Malatesta
- Mother: Elisabetta da Varano

Paola Agnese Malatesta (1393 — 28 February 1449) also Paola of Mantua was an Italian noblewoman of the noble family House of Malatesta, rulers of Rimini and Pesaro. She was born in Pesaro in 1393 to Malatesta IV Malatesta, lord of Pesaro and Fossombrone, and Elisabetta da Varano. On 22 August 1409 she married Gianfrancesco Gonzaga, leader of Mantua, in Pesaro. She was the first Marchesa of Mantua after her husband received the title. Paola had six children. This union introduced the genetic disease of kyphosis to the Gonzaga family which showed in subsequent generations.

She was known as a pious, dignified and keen woman and played a significant role in the Gonzaga court. Paola greatly influenced Mantuan culture by encouraging her husband to bring Vittorino da Feltre to Mantua to tutor their children. Vittorino was an early humanist scholar. At the request of Bernardino da Siena, who visited her in 1418, she built the Church of Saint Paola with an adjoining convent in Mantua around 1420 for the Franciscan Poor Clare Nuns. She retired to the convent after her husband's death in 1444.

Paola died in Mantua in 1449 and was interred in the convent of Santa Paola in monastic habit per her wishes. She is a saint in the Franciscan martyrology.

== Gallery ==
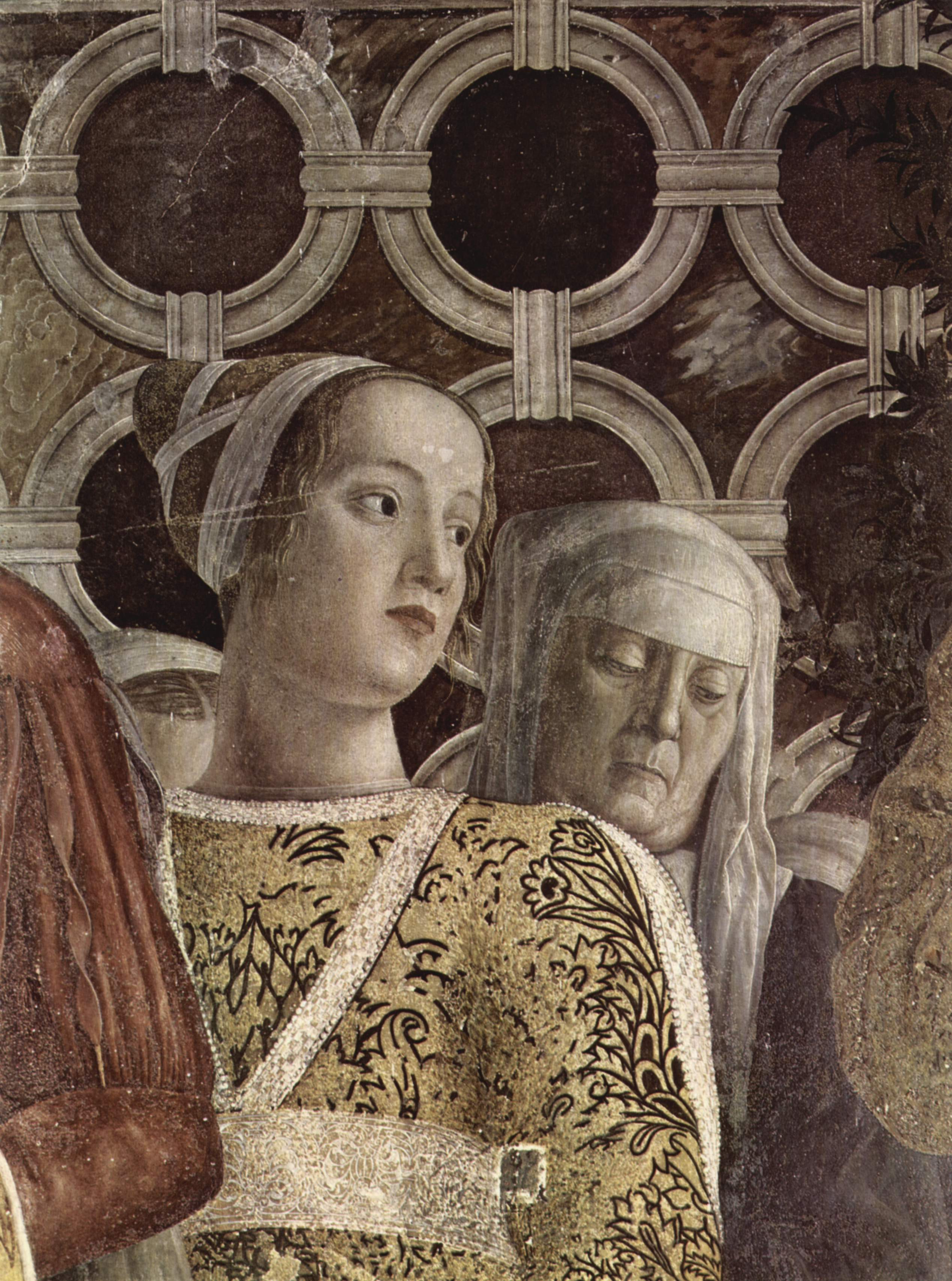
Portrait by Andrea Mantegna presumed to be of Paola Malatesta standing behind Barbara of Brandenburg

== Bibliography ==
- Adelaide Murgia (1972). I Gonzaga. Milan: Mondadori.
- Roberto Brunelli (2010). I Gonzaga. Quattro secoli per una dinastia. Mantua.
- Anna Falcioni (2007). Dizionario Biografico degli Italia. Vol. 68. Treccani.
