= Battle of Sant'Egidio =

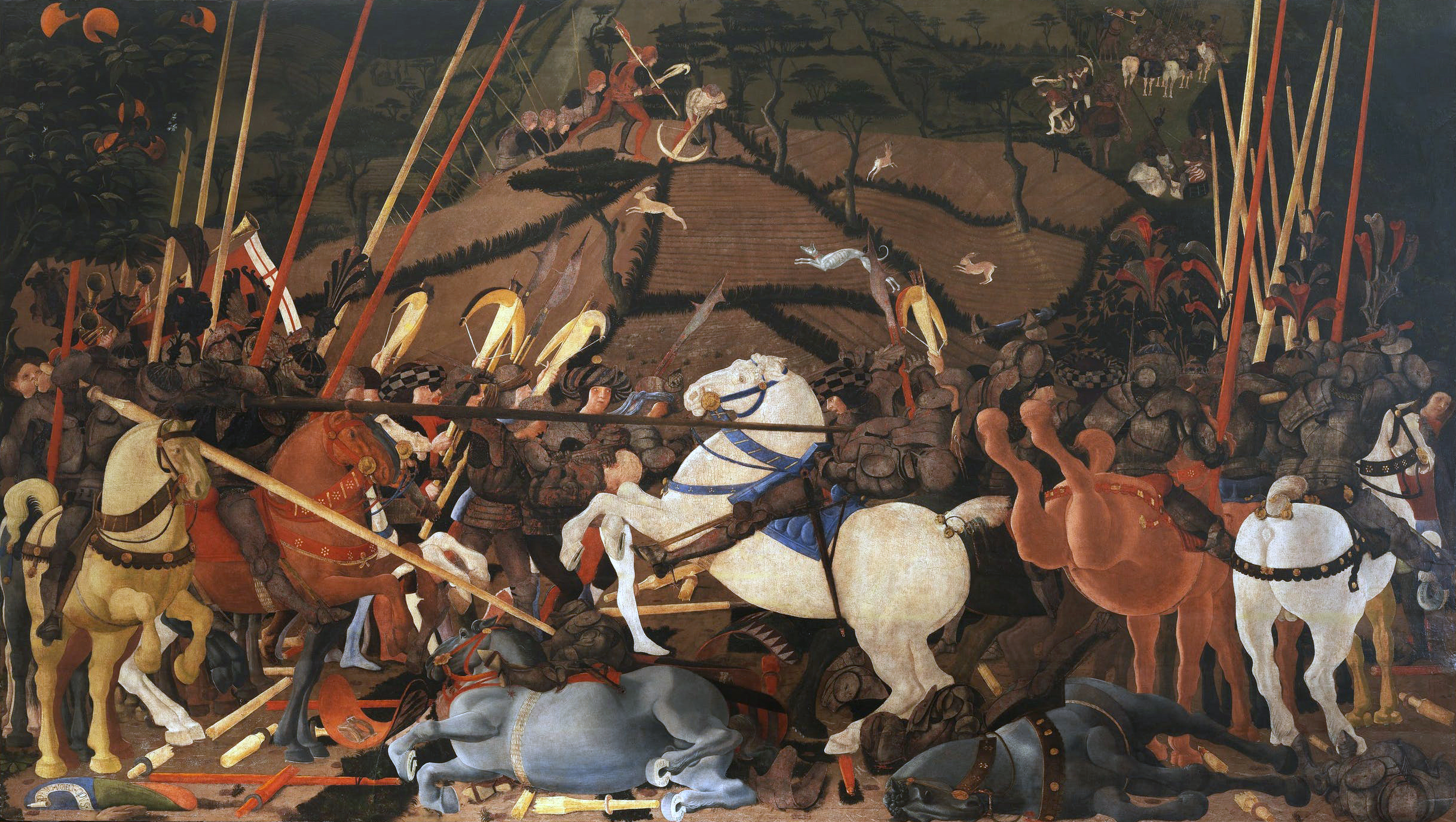
- The Battle of San Romano, panel by Paolo Uccello, Galleria degli Uffizi – for a long time considered a depiction of the Battle of Sant'Egidio
Date	12 July 1416
Location	Sant'Egidio, near Umbertide
Result	victory of Braccio da Montone

Belligerents
Company of Montone	Perugia

Commanders and leaders
Braccio da Montone	Carlo I Malatesta (POW)

Casualties and losses
180 killed	300 killed

The Battle of Sant'Egidio was fought on 12 July 1416 at Sant'Egidio, near Umbertide (central Italy) between the condottiere Braccio da Montone and the troops of Perugia, under Carlo I Malatesta. Braccio's victory resulted in his long-desired conquest of Perugia, of which he became lord.

As a result of his political ties to John XXIII against Ladislaus, Braccio also received the command of Bologna before he became lord of Perugia.

The battle lasted for 7 hours and saw the massive use of heavy cavalry. Braccio used his famous tactics of using repeated cavalry assaults carried on by smaller units, seeking for weak spots in the enemy's line. This also allowed his troops time to refresh, as the battle was fought under an implacable sun.

The Perugians had 3,000 cavalry captured and 300 casualties; Braccio da Montone's troupes had 180 men-at-arms killed. Members of the Michelotti family taken prisoners were killed, a not usual outcome for condottieri battles. Both Carlo I Malatesta and his cousin Galeazzo Malatesta were taken as prisoners.
