= Carlo Gonzaga of Milan =

Italian nobleman

Carlo Gonzaga (died 21 December 1456), Lord of Sabbioneta, was an Italian nobleman of the Mantuan House of Gonzaga who rose to the position of Captain of the People in the Ambrosian Republic of Milan, and eventually ruled practically as an autocrat. He was the younger son of Gianfrancesco Gonzaga and Paola Malatesta, as well as a friend of the humanist writer Francesco Filelfo. His brother was Ludovico III Gonzaga, Marquis of Mantua, and became a rival of his for Mantua and in the field of battle.

== Biography ==
Carlo Gonzaga was born in Mantua. He married twice, first to Lucia d'Este, daughter of Niccolò III d'Este, who died childless, and then to Ringarda Manfredi, who gave him three daughters and a son.

After the death of his father in 1444 Ludovico became Marquis and removed all authority from Carlo. He went to Venice and fought in her service against the Ambrosian Republic until he defected with Francesco Sforza in 1447. He was appointed Captain of the People in November of that year. He eventually counseled Giovanni Appiano and Giovanni Ossona, the leaders of the Guelphs, in their term in leadership, becoming so powerful that he was raised in all but name to the status of an absolute ruler. He had a lavish house and started replacing men in government to those in his favor. A Ghibelline conspiracy rose against him and his government, but he shattered it, and his Guelph underlings massacred many Ghibellines.

Gonzaga made attempts for peace first with Republic of Venice, then with Francesco Sforza, offering the latter the city of Crema. Gonzaga was thrown into jail at first, but shortly after pardoned with many other Guelphs, and made head of a temporary government until the coronation of Sforza. Later, furious at Sforza for making an alliance with Ludovico, he plotted with Guglielmo of Montferrat in 1450 and was thrown into the Pavian prison. He was released when he conceded to give up his war spoils, Alessandria and Tortona.

In the spring of 1453 Carlo Gonzaga, allied with the Republic of Venice, raised an army of 4,000 to invade Mantua and overthrow his brother Ludovico III Gonzaga, Marquis of Mantova. Carlo seized the strongpoints of Castelbelforte (then known as Castelbonafisso) and Bigarello, but was defeated by Ludovico's forces and a detachment of Milanese allies at Castellaro Lagusello an outlying hamlet by the village of Monzambano. Forced to retreat across the Adige river at Legnago Carlo and his Venetian allies were pursued and decisively defeated on 14 June 1453 battle at Villabona near Goito. The historian Ludovico Muratori states that in the battle at Villabona Carlo lost 1,000 horses and 200 men-at-arms and was forced to seek shelter with the Este family in Ferrara. The Mantuan Jesuit Antonio Possevino instead states that Carlo was captured in the battle, but released immediately thereafter on request of the Marquis of Este and allowed to proceed to Ferrara.

Nevertheless, with the Treaty of Lodi in 1454 Ludovico was forced to give back all he stole from Carlo. Later Carlo was made Lord of Sabbioneta by Sforza. He died heirless, his only son presumably having fallen prey to death in years previous, and his lands passed to his brother Ludovico ΙΙΙ Gonzaga.

== Sources ==
- Bartlett, Kenneth R. (2013). A Short History of the Italian Renaissance. University of Toronto Press.
- A History of Milan under the Sforza. Cecilia M. Ady, Edward Armstrong; Methuen & Co., 1907.
- (in Italian) Note biografiche di Capitani di Guerra e di Condottieri di Ventura operanti in Italia nel 1330–1550: Ludovico Gonzaga
- (in Italian) Storia di Milano
