= Ludovico III Gonzaga of Mantua =

Marquis of Mantua from 1444 to 1478

Ludovico III Gonzaga
- Marquis of Mantua
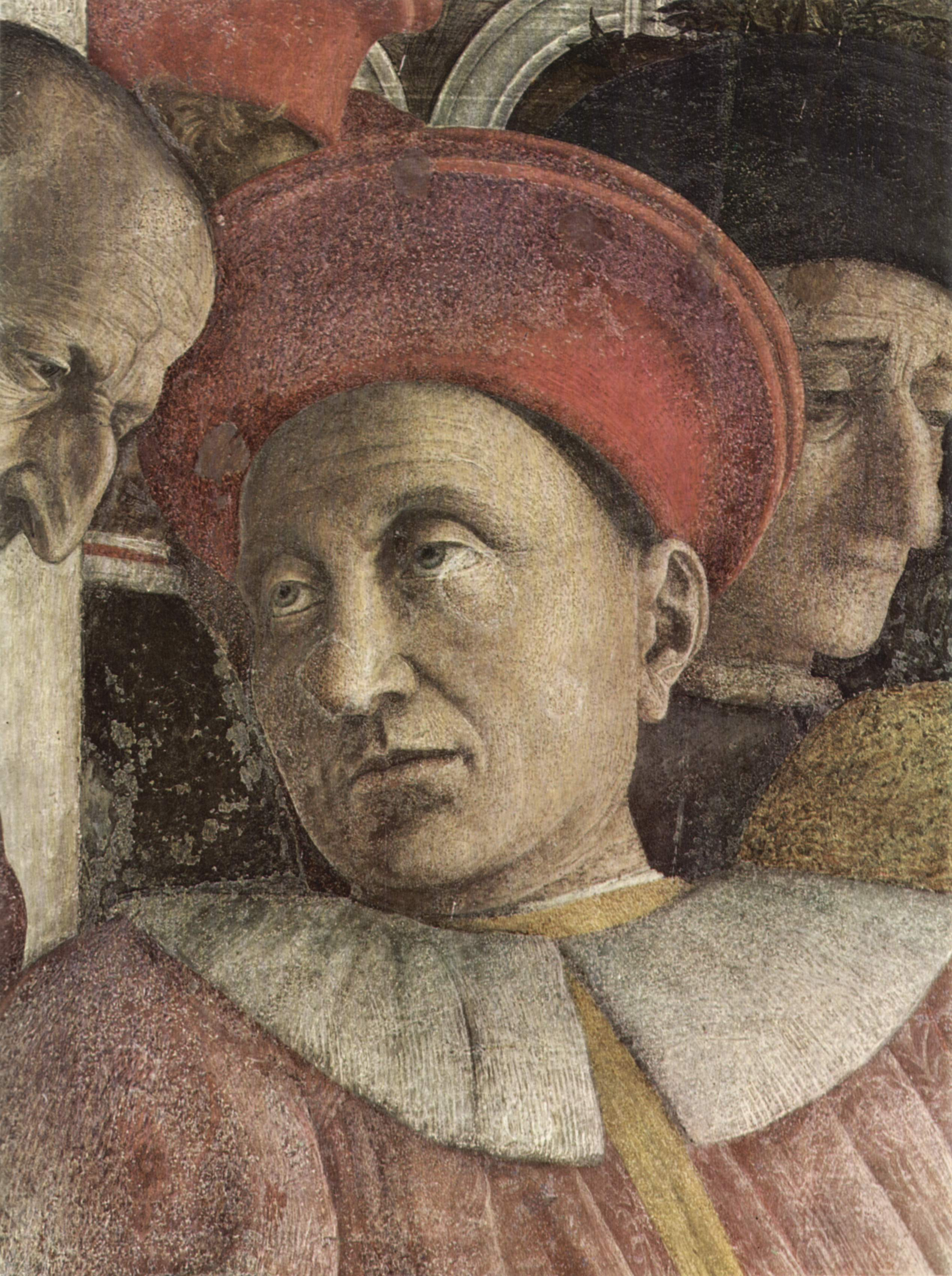
- The Court of Mantua, detail: Ludovico III Gonzaga, Marquis of Mantua
- Born: 5 June 1412; Mantua, Margravate of Mantua
- Died: 12 June 1478 (aged 66); Goito, Margravate of Mantua
- Noble family: Gonzaga
- Spouse: Barbara of Brandenburg
- Issue: Federico I Francesco; Gianfrancesco; Dorotea; Rodolfo; Barbara
- Father: Gianfrancesco I Gonzaga
- Mother: Paola Malatesta

Ludovico III Gonzaga of Mantua, known as the Turk (Italian: il Turco), also spelled Lodovico (also Ludovico II; 5 June 1412 – 12 June 1478) was the ruler of the Italian city of Mantua from 1444 to his death in 1478.

== Biography ==
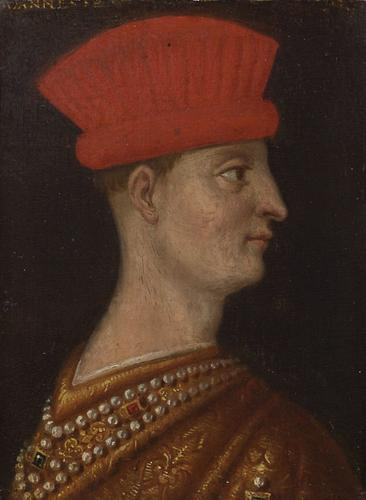
Gianfrancesco I Gonzaga.

Ludovico was the son of Gianfrancesco I Gonzaga and Paola Malatesta daughter of Malatesta IV Malatesta of Pesaro.

Ludovico followed the path of his father, Gianfrancesco, fighting as a condottiero from as early as 1432, when Gianfrancesco was vice-commander of Francesco Bussone's army. In 1433, he married Barbara of Brandenburg, niece of emperor Sigismund.

Starting from 1436 (perhaps without the approval of his father), he entered the service of the Visconti of the Duchy of Milan. The result was that Gianfrancesco exiled Ludovico from Mantua, together with his wife, naming Carlo Gonzaga as heir. However, in 1438, Gianfrancesco himself was hired by the Visconti, and reconciled with Ludovico in 1441. Ludovico succeeded to the marquisate of Mantua in 1444, although part of the family fiefs went to his brothers Carlo, Gianlucido and Alessandro. At the time, the Mantuan state was reduced in size and was in poor condition after years of war and large expenses.

From 1445 to 1450, Ludovico served as condottiero for Milan, Florence, Venice, and Naples, switching his allegiance to grant a higher level of peace for his lands. In 1448, he took part in the battle of Caravaggio, and was forced to flee. In 1449, he entered the service of Venice in the league formed with Florence against Milan. In 1450, he received permission to lead an army for King Alfonso of Naples in Lombardy, with the intent of gaining some possessions for himself. However, Francesco Sforza, the new Duke of Milan, enticed him into an alliance with the promise of turning over to him Lonato, Peschiera and Asola, formerly Mantuan territories but then part of Venice. Venice responded by sacking Castiglione delle Stiviere (1452) and hiring Ludovico's brother, Carlo.

Carlo Gonzaga invaded his brother Ludovico's Mantuan territories on 9 March 1453 with 4,000 soldiers, seizing Castelbelforte (then known as Castelbonafisso) and Bigarello. Ludovico gathered an army of 3,000 horse and 500 infantry and along with a detachment of Milanese troops led by the condottiere Tiberio Brandolini defeated Carlo at Castellaro Lagusello near Monzambano. Ludovico then pursued the retreating Carlo across the river Adige and, on 14 June 1453, routed the troops of Carlo Gonzaga at Villabona near Goito. Venetian troops under Niccolò Piccinino however thwarted his attempt to regain Asola. The Peace of Lodi (1454) obliged Ludovico to give back all his conquests, and to renounce definitively his claim to the three cities. However, he obtained his brother's land after Carlo's childless death in 1456.

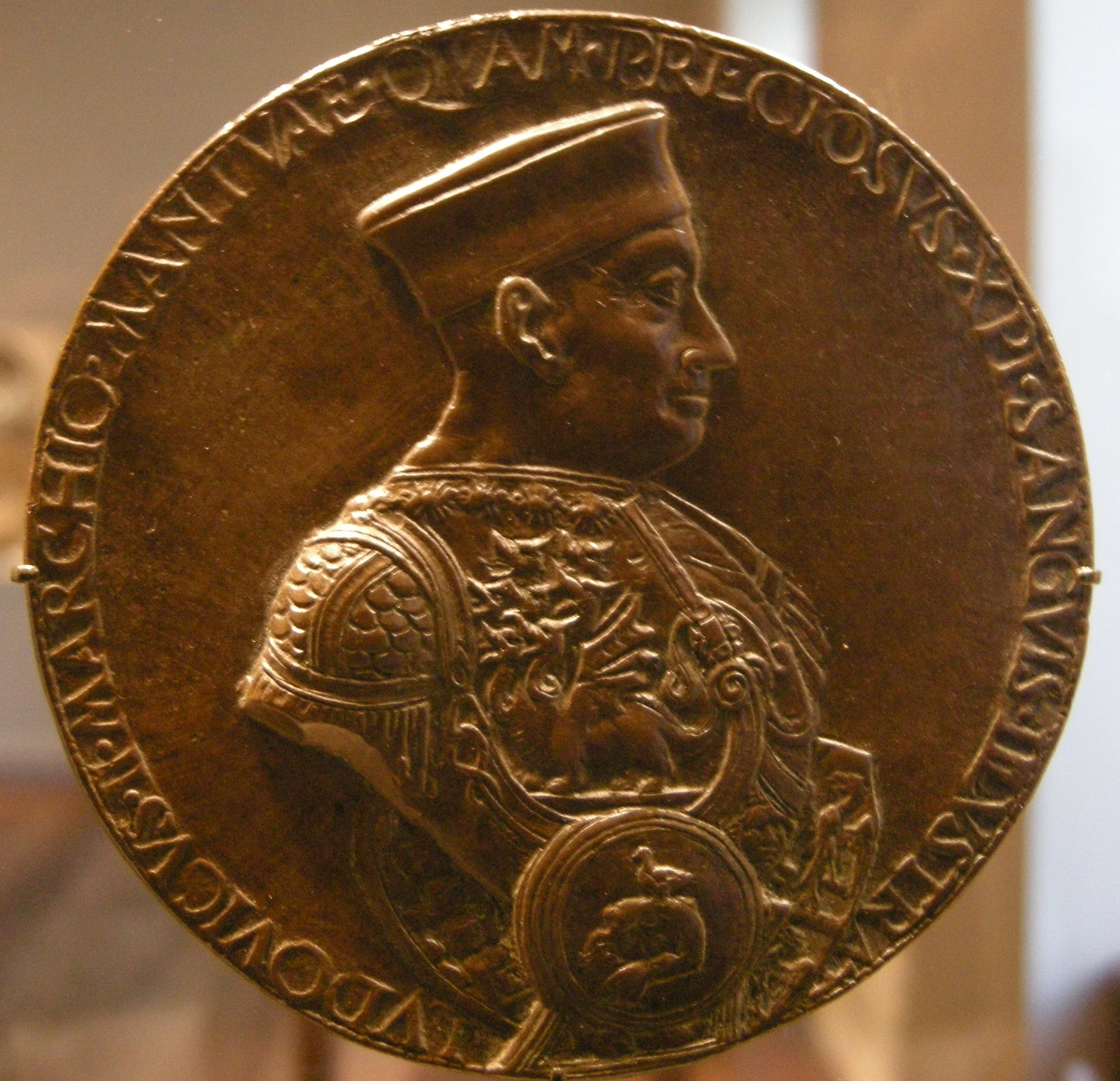
Medal of Ludovico III Gonzaga (1475).

The moment of highest prestige for Mantua was the Council, held in the city from 27 May 1459 to 19 January 1460, summoned by Pope Pius II to launch a crusade against the Ottoman Turks, who had conquered Constantinople some years earlier. However, the pope was not satisfied with the host city, writing: "The place was marshy and unhealthy, and the heat burnt up everything; the wine was unpalatable and the food unpleasant." However, the council ended on a note of great personal prestige for Ludovico with the elevation of his son Francesco to the purple.

From 1466, Ludovico was more or less constantly at the service of the Sforza of Milan. He died in Goito in 1478, during a plague. He was buried in Mantua cathedral.

== Education ==
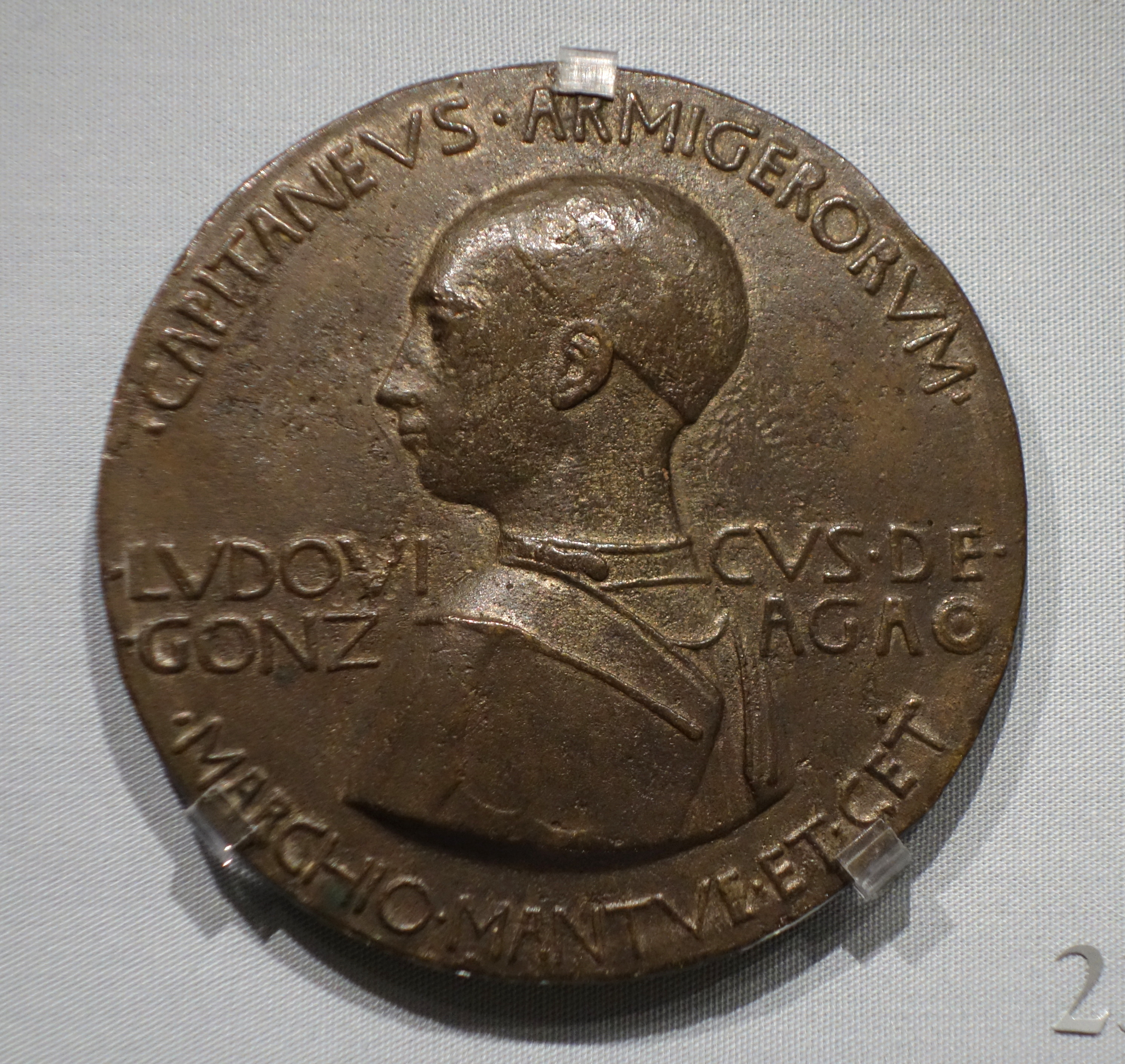
Medal by Pisanello, c. 1447

On the orders of his father, Ludovico's education had been entrusted to the humanist Vittorino da Feltre. Vittorino undertook "the difficult enterprise in the interests of the commonwealth for... the education of a good prince would benefit the people he ruled." The teaching was markedly moral and religious and contained a "vein of laical asceticism almost." This, argues the arts scholar Franco Borsi, explains not only Ludovico's religious faith that led him to found churches and host Pius II's Council, but also his concern for a humanistic culture and the growth in public works throughout the city, from the paving of the streets and building of a clock tower to the reorganization of the city centre. Among the famous humanists invited to the city was the Genoese scholar Leon Battista Alberti, who designed the San Sebastiano church and the San' Andrea church. Also, in 1460, Ludovico appointed Andrea Mantegna as court artist to the Gonzaga family.

Ludovico is featured in the Treatise on Architecture, from c. 1465, by the Florentine sculptor-architect Antonio di Pietro Averlino (c. 1400 – c. 1469), better known as Filarete. The treatise takes the format of a Platonic dialogue, featuring an unnamed architect (evidently Filarete himself) who is building a new city for a princely patron (evidently Francesco Sforza of Milan). During the dialogue interspersing the treatise they are visited by another lord, in the figure of Ludovico: his role in the dialogue is to persuade Sforza that he has seen the error of his ways in showing favour to "modern architecture", by which is meant Gothic architecture, and, having seen the architecture of antiquity in Rome, now favours such architecture instead, which is also what Filarete is also trying to persuade his patron.

== Children ==
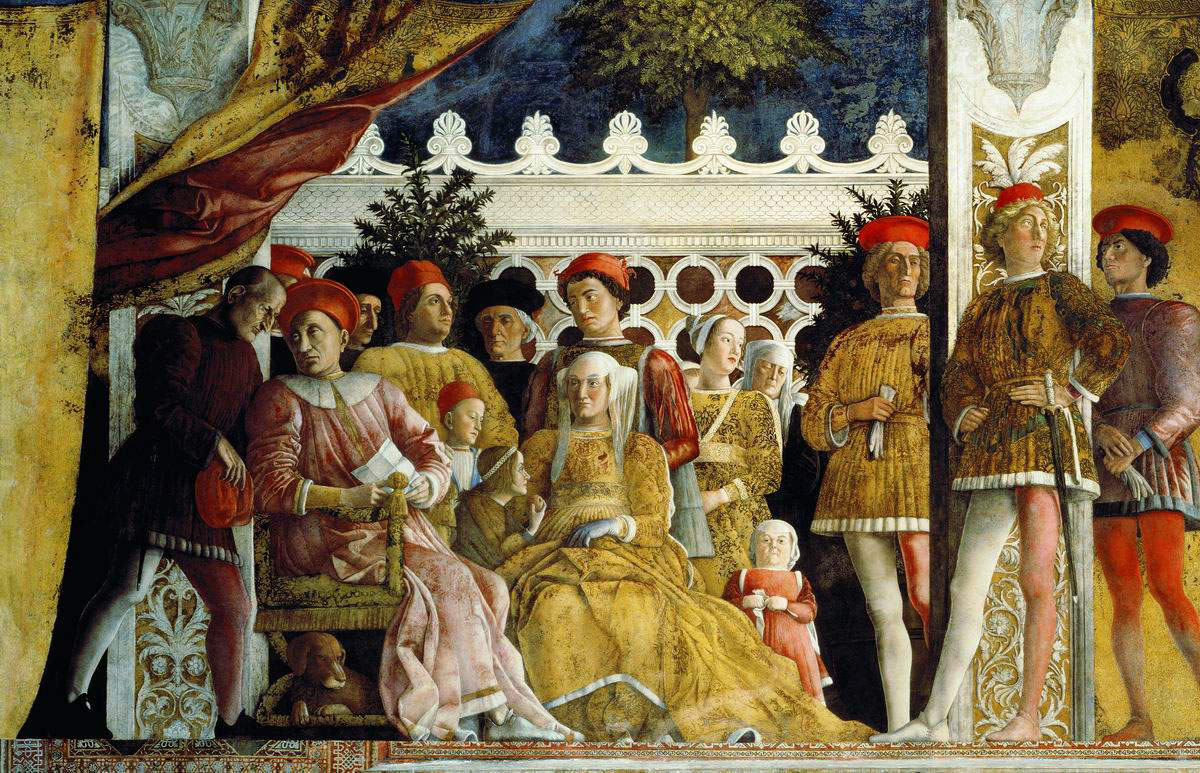
The Court of Mantua. At the left, Ludovico II Gonzaga. Besides him his wife Barbara von Brandenburg and their siblings Ludovico Gonzaga, Paola Gonzaga and Rodolfo Gonzaga.

Ludovico III and Barbara had fourteen children:

- Federico (1438? – died in infancy).
- Maddalena (1439? – died in infancy).
- Elisabetta (1440? – died in infancy).
- Federico I (1441 – 1484), Marquis of Mantua; married Margaret of Bavaria, daughter of Albert III, Duke of Bavaria and Anna, Duchess of Brunswick-Grubenhagen
- Francesco (1444 – 1483), created Cardinal by Pope Pius II.
- Paola Bianca (1445–1447), died in infancy.
- Gianfrancesco (1446 – 1496), Count of Sabbioneta and Lord of Bozzolo; married Antonia del Balzo. Had issue
- Susanna (1447–1481), a nun at Santa Paola di Mantua.
- Dorotea (1449–1467), married to Galeazzo Maria Sforza, Duke of Milan.
- Cecilia (1451–1472), a nun at Santa Chiara di Mantua.
- Rodolfo (1452–1495), Lord of Castiglione delle Stiviere, Solferino, Suzzara and Poviglio; married firstly Antonia Malatesta daughter of Sigismondo Pandolfo Malatesta and then Caterina Pico. His great-grandson was Aloysius Gonzaga.
- Barbara (1455–1503), married in 1474 Eberhard I, Duke of Württemberg
- Ludovico (1460–1511), Bishop of Mantua.
- Paola (1463–1497), married Leonhard, Count of Gorizia.
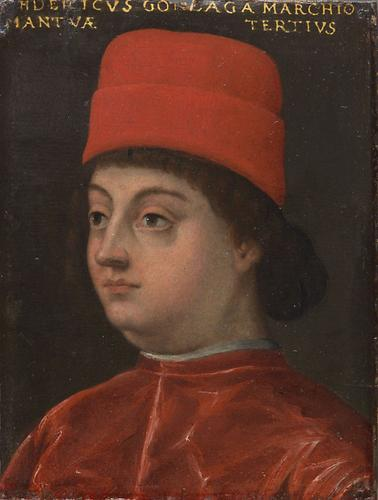
Portrait of Federico I Gonzaga at the Uffizi, Florence Italy

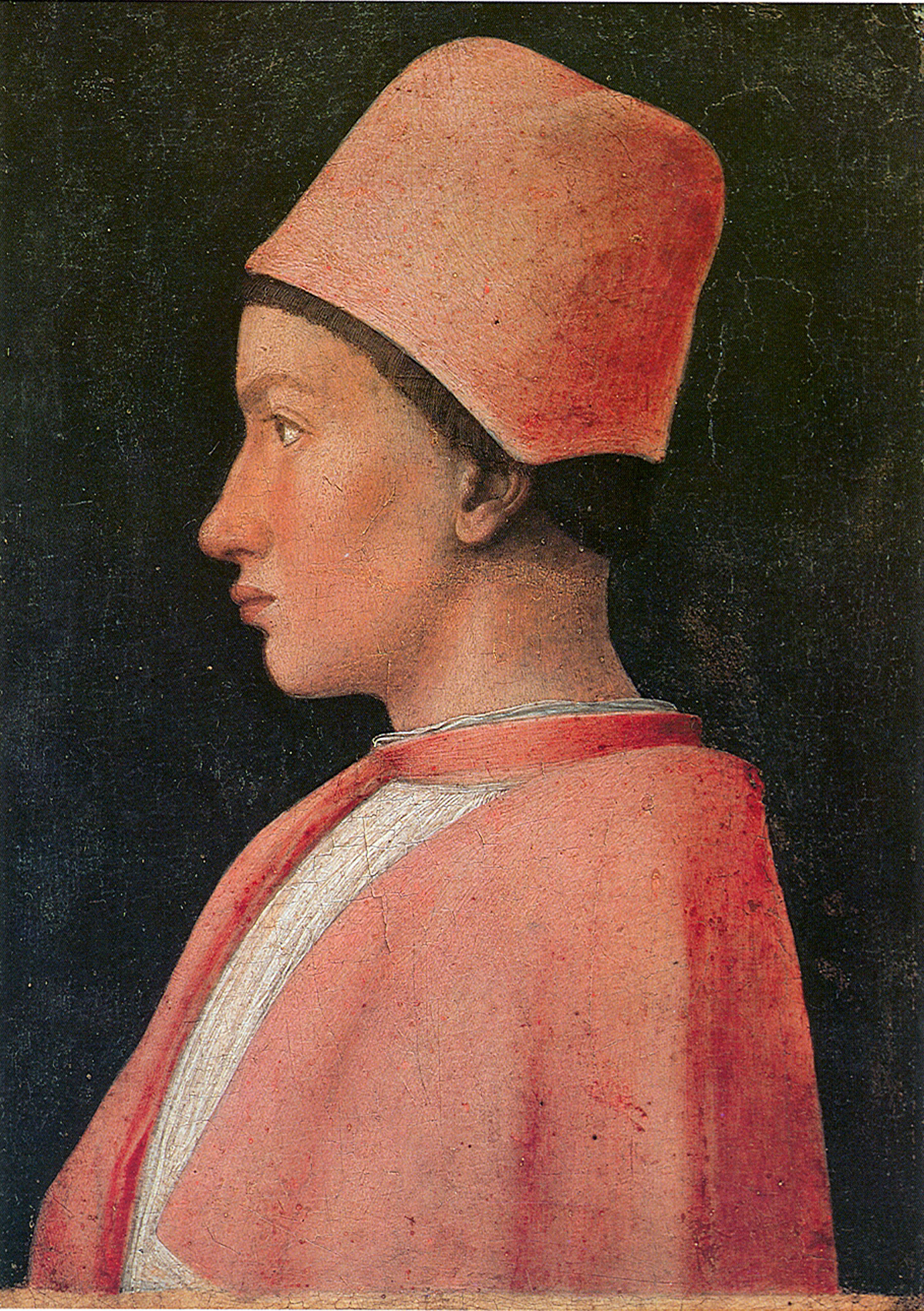
Portrait of Francesco Gonzaga by Andrea Mantegna, c. 1461

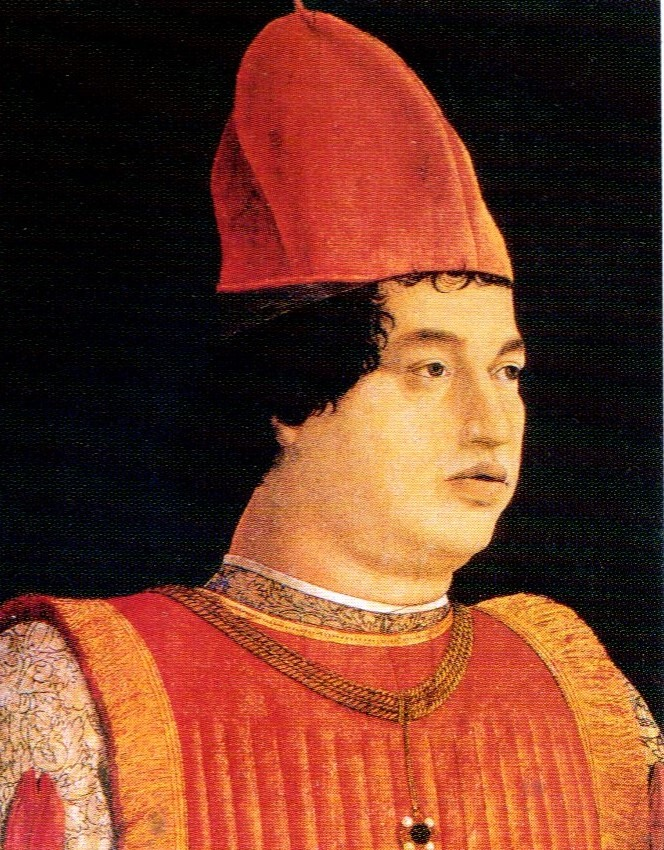
Portrait of Gianfrancesco Gonzaga

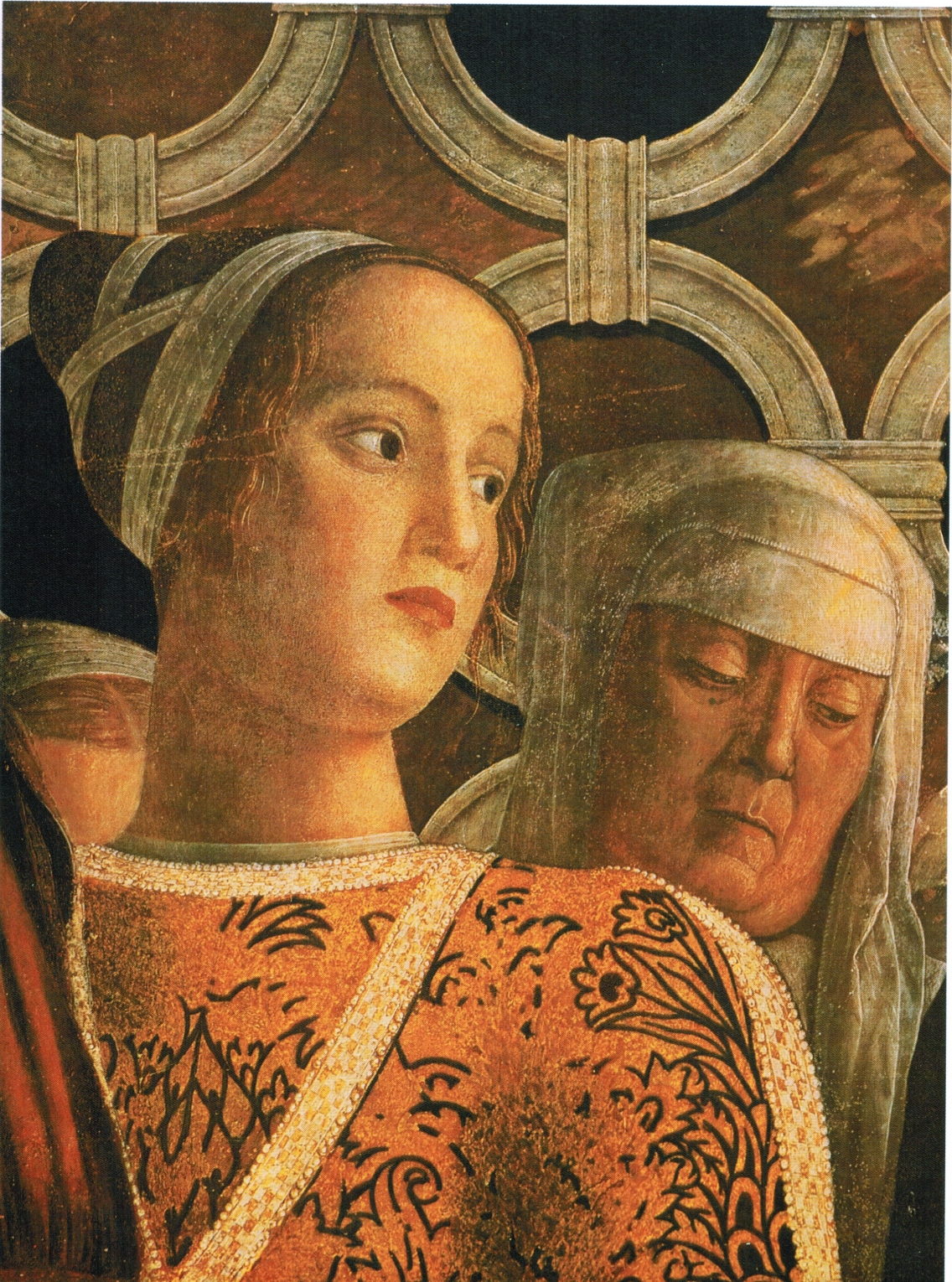
Barbara Gonzaga

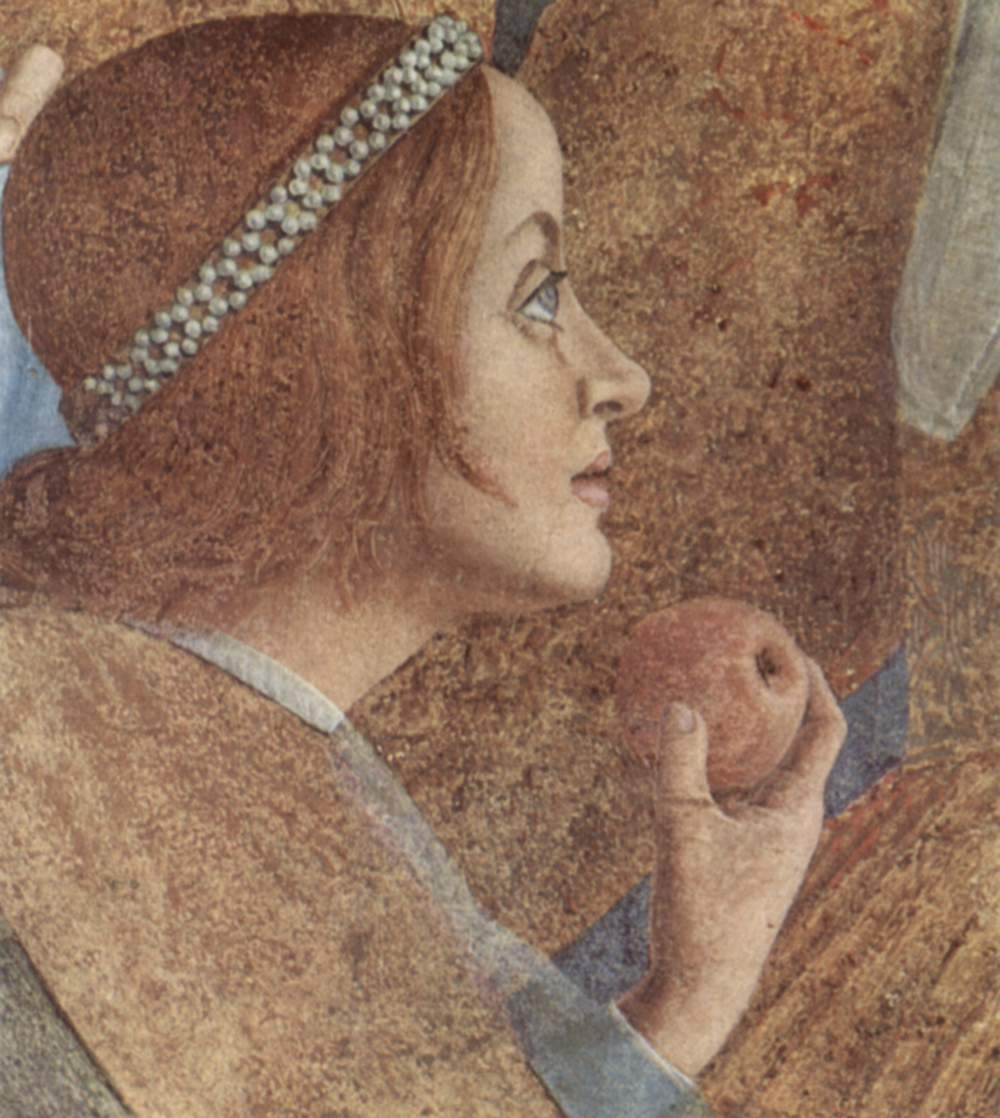
Paola Gonzaga, fresco by Andrea Mantegna, Ducal Palace, Mantua

In addition, Ludovico III had two illegitimate daughters: Caterina (wife of Gianfrancesco Secco, Conte di Calcio) and Gabriella (wife of Corrado Fogliani, Marchese di Vighizzolo).

It was said that the daughters of Barbara and Ludovico III had hunched backs, that is why Susanna was spurned by Galeazzo Maria Sforza and the marriage with Dorotea was delayed until the Milanese court found that her physical problems aren't so notorious like her oldest sister. Leonhard of Gorizia also postponed his marriage to Paola due to this and when they eventually married they had one stillborn child as it is thought that this deformity in her made it harder to have children.

== See also ==
- Wars in Lombardy

== Sources ==
- Antenhofer, Christina (2001). "From Local Signori to European High Nobility: The Gonzaga Family Networks in the Fifteenth Century". In Johnson, Christopher H.; Sabean, David Warren; Teuscher, Simon; Trivellato, Francesca (eds.). Transregional and Transnational Families in Europe and Beyond: Experiences. Berghahn books.
- James, Carolyn (2020). A Renaissance Marriage: The Political and Personal Alliance of Isabella d'Este & Francesco Gonzaga, 1490-1519. Oxford University Press.
- Murgia, Adelaide (1972). I Gonzaga. Milan: Mondadori.

Ludovico III Gonzaga of Mantua House of Gonzaga Born: 5 June 1412 Died: 12 June 1478
Preceded by Gianfrancesco I	Marquis of Mantua; 1444–1478	Succeeded by Federico I
