= Guidantonio da Montefeltro =

Count of Urbino (1377–1443)

Family coat of arms

Guidantonio da Montefeltro (1377 – February 1443) was count of Urbino in Italy from 1403 until his death.

In 1403, at the death of his father Antonio, Guidantonio inherited the family lands in the region of Italy called the Marche. Later he abandoned the Papal suzerainty and allied with King Ladislaus of Naples, who made him Gran conestabile (High constable) of the Kingdom of Naples in 1411. Excommunicated by Pope Gregory XII, he took advantage of that move to conquer Assisi. He also controlled Castello, Cagli, Forlì, and Forlimpopoli.

Guidantonio later reconciled with Pope Martin V and with his enemy, the condottiero Braccio da Montone. In 1427 he occupied Casteldurante.

He also had the life title of Duke of Spoleto because he held the government of the Duchy of Spoleto (then an administrative region of the papal states) with the ducal rank for life.

He died in 1443, his son Oddantonio succeeding him in Urbino.

== Family and children ==
He married Ringarda Malatesta in 1397, but the two had no children. Guidantonio remarried with Caterina Colonna, the niece of Pope Martin V, who bore him 9 children. Apart from Oddantonio, his most famous son was the legitimated Federico, who was Duke of Urbino, as well as a condottiero and one of the most famous patron of arts in the Italian Renaissance. His daughter Sveva (1434–1478) married Alessandro Sforza, lord of Pesaro.

== Sources ==
- Litta, P. (1834). Famiglie celebri italiane. Milan.
- Ugolini, F. (1859). Vite dei conti e duchi di Urbino. Urbino.

Preceded by Antonio II	Count of Urbino; 1403–1443	Succeeded by Oddantonio
