= Battle of Zagonara =

1424 battle between Florence and Milan

- Part of Wars in Lombardy
Date	28 July 1424
Location	Lugo di Romagna
Result	Milanese victory

Belligerents
Duchy of Milan	Republic of Florence

Commanders and leaders
Angelo della Pergola; Filippo Maria Visconti	Carlo I Malatesta; Pandolfo III Malatesta; Alberico Novello da Barbiano

Strength
4,000 cavalry, 4,000 infantry	8,000–9,000 cavalry, 3,000 infantry

The Battle of Zagonara was fought on 28 July 1424 at Zagonara (Lugo di Romagna) between the armies of the Republic of Florence and that of Filippo Maria Visconti, duke of Milan, an episode of the Wars in Lombardy. A number of famous Italian condottieri of the 15th century took part in the battle. The only condottiero who died in the battle was Lodovico degli Obizzi, who fell off his horse and suffocated in the mud.

The battle occurred when Carlo I Malatesta, lord of Rimini, intervened in support of Alberico Novello da Barbiano, whose troops were under siege in the castle of Zagonara by Milanese mercenaries under Angelo della Pergola. Pergola had about 4,000 cavalry and 4,000 infantry. Malatesta's troops (amounting to some 8,000 cavalry) abandoned the siege of Forlì and attacked the Visconti, led by Secco da Montagnana.

Soon the initial attack of the Florentine cavalry waned. After several hours of fighting, they were routed by Pergola's counterattack. Malatesta himself was captured, together with about 3,000 men-at-arms and 2,000 infantrymen, and the castle was destroyed.

== Sources ==
- Leardo Mascanzoni: "La battaglia di Zagonara"
