= Montefeltrano II da Montefeltro =

Italian condottiero

Montefeltrano II da Montefeltro (died 1255) was an Italian condottiero, who was lord of Urbino from 1242 until his death. He was also count of Montefeltro and Pietrarubbia.

He was son of Bonconte da Montefeltro, first count of Urbino. He was Ghibelline follower and fought for Philip of Swabia in Sicily, to defend the Hohenstaufen rights there. He was succeeded in Urbino by his son Guido I da Montefeltro.

== Notes ==
| Preceded by Buonconte | Lord of Urbino; 1242–1255 | Succeeded by Guido I |
