= Oddantonio da Montefeltro =

First duke of Urbino (1428–1444)

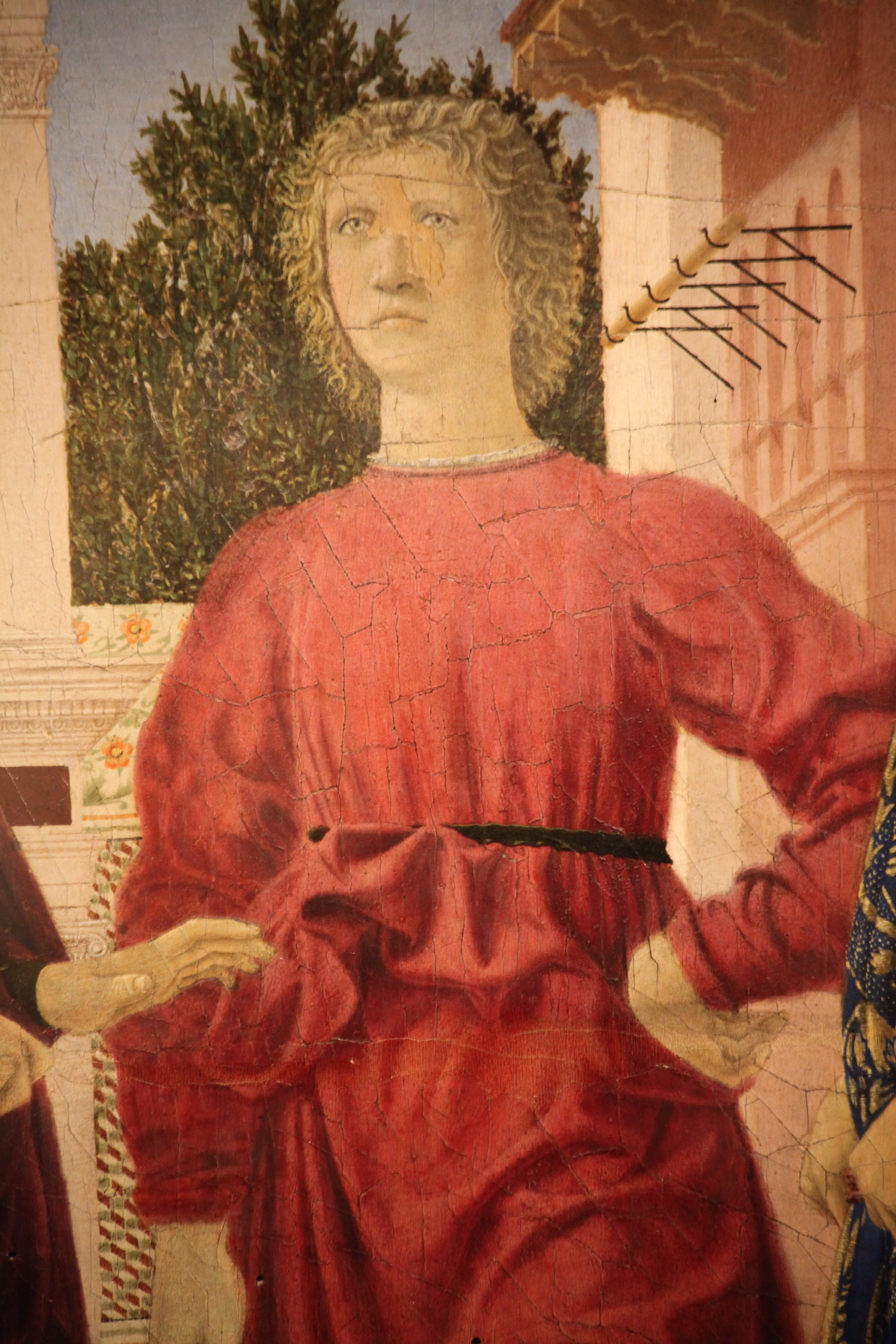
A figure from Piero della Francesca's Flagellation of Christ, often thought to represent Oddantonio

Oddantonio da Montefeltro (1428 – 22 July 1444) was the first duke of Urbino in Italy.

Oddantonio succeeded his father Guidantonio as count of Urbino. He was the half-brother of Federico da Montefeltro. The testamentary division of the county between Oddantonio and Federico is not known; nor is the relationship between the two. However, it has been suggested that Federico provided at least some financial support to his brother via his activity as condottiero.

On 25 April 1443, at the age of sixteen, in a ceremony in Siena the Pope Eugene IV made him Duke of Urbino as a reward for his support in the war against the Sforza in the Marche.

Oddantonio exhausted the treasury of the small state with his excessive lifestyle (he is reported to have held extravagant parties, some lasting over 15 days), and consequently had to exert heavy taxes over the duchy. He also sought the support of their arch-enemies, the Malatesta, seemingly reaching a complete independence from them.

In the night between 21 and 22 July 1444 he was killed by conspirators in the Ducal Palace, together with his counsellors Manfredo dei Pio da Carpi and Tommaso di Guido dell'Agnello.

Federico succeeded him as Duke of Urbino. Questions have been raised about the possibility of his involvement in Oddantonio's assassination, though no definitive proof of any such involvement exists.

== See also ==
- Flagellation of Christ (Piero della Francesca)

Preceded by Guidantonio	Duke of Urbino; 1443–1444	Succeeded by Federico III
