= Guido I da Montefeltro =

Italian military strategist

Guido da Montefeltro (1223 – 29 September 1298) was an Italian military strategist and lord of Urbino. He became a friar late in life, and was condemned by Dante Alighieri in his Divine Comedy for giving false or fraudulent counsel.

== Biography ==
Born in San Leo, he was the son of Montefeltrano II da Montefeltro.

Guido led the Ghibellines of Romagna to victory over the Guelphs at Ponte San Procolo in 1275. Later that year he won a victory over the Malatesta of Rimini at Raversano, driving the Malatesta from Cesena. By the next year, Guido was captain of Forlì, with control of all antipapal power in Romagna. Guido commanded the defenders during the siege of Forlì in 1282–1283, against French-commanded forces loyal to Pope Martin IV. Although Guido's forces inflicted heavy casualties on their foes, eventually Forlì fell to the papal forces, leading most of Romagna to submit to papal control. Guido accepted the authority of Pope Honorius IV in 1286.

Nonetheless, Guido emerged back into public life in 1288, when he was excommunicated and became captain of the Ghibellines of Pisa. Over the next few years, he aided Pisa in its struggle against Florence, and the city of Urbino against Cesena.

In 1296 Pope Boniface VIII admitted Guido back into the Church, and gave him back the lordship of Montefeltro. In the same year he entered the Franciscan order. He died two years later in Ancona.

== Role in Dante's Inferno ==
In 1298 Boniface VIII called on Guido for advice in dealing with his struggles against the Colonna family, who had disputed the legitimacy of Boniface's election, and had taken refuge in a fortress in Palestrina. Guido's advice was to promise the Colonnas amnesty, and then renege on the promise once they had emerged from their fortress.

It is this advice that led Dante Alighieri to place Guido in Hell. In Canto XXVII of the Inferno, Guido recounts how he reluctantly gave advice to Boniface, only after Boniface had agreed to absolve him for the sin of his fraudulent counsel. As Guido recounts his story, after his death St. Francis arrived to claim his soul for the saved, but a black Cherub asserted Hell's superior claim.

Preceded by Montefeltrano II	Lord of Urbino; 1255–1296	Succeeded by Federico I
