= Braccio da Montone =

Italian military leader (1368–1424)

- Prince of Capua
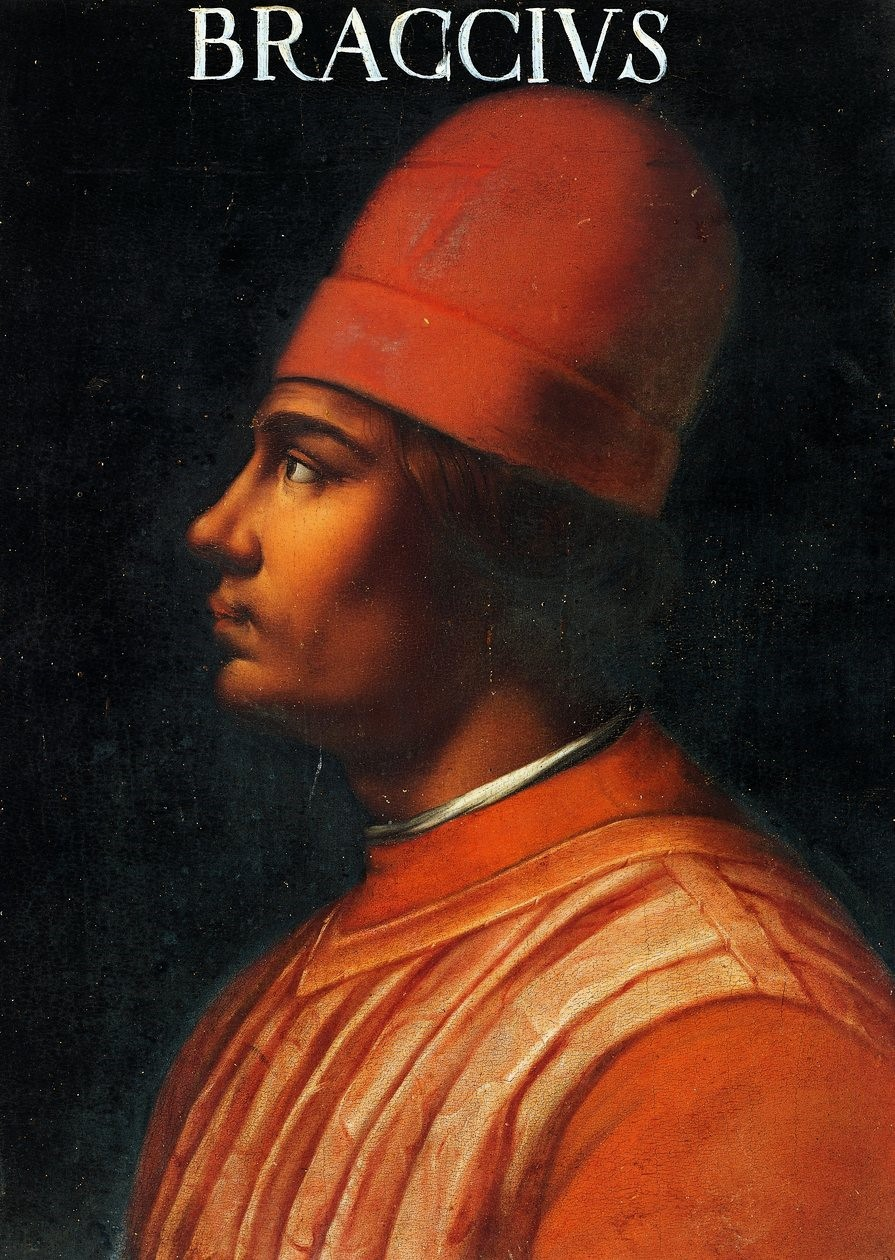
- Portrait of Braccio da Montone by Cristofano dell'Altissimo, 1552–68. Florence, Galleria degli Uffizi

Prince of Capua
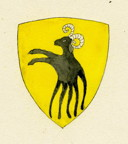
- Coat of arms
- Reign: July 1421 – 5 June 1424
- Predecessor: Rinaldo d'Angiò-Durazzo
- Successor: Sergianni Caracciolo
- Born: Andrea Fortebraccio; Perugia
- Died: 5 June 1424 (aged 55); L'Aquila
- Buried: Chiesa di San Francesco al Prato, Perugia
- Noble family: Fortebraccio
- Spouses: Elisabetta Armanni; Nicolina da Varano
- Issue: Oddo Fortebraccio; Lucrezia Fortebraccio; Carlotta Fortebraccio; Carlo Fortebraccio (legitimate)
- Father: Oddo Fortebraccio
- Mother: Giacoma Montemelini

Braccio da Montone (1 July 1368 – 5 June 1424), born Andrea Fortebraccio, was a renowned Italian condottiero in the early 15th century. He distinguished himself through innovative military strategies and was among the first mercenary leaders to pursue the creation of an independent dominion. Braccio successfully seized control of several key cities in the regions of Umbria and Lazio, but his ambitions ultimately came to an end with his defeat and death during the War of L'Aquila in 1424.

== Biography ==
He was born in Perugia to the nobleman Oddo Fortebraccio and Giacoma Montemelini. (Note: According to some sources, Braccio was born in Perugia and later moved to Montone.)

He began his military career as a page in the company of Guido d'Asciano. After his family was exiled from Perugia and he lost the castle of Montone, he joined Alberico da Barbiano's "Company of St. George", where he befriended Muzio Attendolo Sforza. Leading a force of 150 knights, Braccio carried out several guerrilla-style operations that anticipated the tactics later employed by his own army.

After a short return to Montone, he fought for the Montefeltro and the Malatesta in Romagna, being slightly crippled during the siege of the Castle of Fossombrone (1391). In 1394 Braccio was briefly held prisoner in the Rocca of Umbertide, and released after the payment of a ransom. In 1395 he fought again for Barbiano in the Kingdom of Naples, and two years later he was hired by the Republic of Florence. In 1398 he fought for the Pope in the war against Perugia.

In 1402, at the death of Gian Galeazzo Visconti, he fought against the Milanese army for the Pope. The following year Boniface IX regained Bologna, Perugia and Assisi, but the exiled Perugini could not return to the city: Braccio therefore returned again under Barbiano's aegis against Faenza and the Papal States. When his companions denounced him to Alberico, alleging he was planning to kill the commander, Braccio was forced to flee. In 1406 he fought against Perugia with other exiled, who, the following year, formed the great part of his new company, with which Braccio ravaged the Umbrian countryside. In May 1407 the citizens of Rocca Contrada gave him the seigniory of the town, in exchange for his support in combatting the marquess of Fermo.

Later Braccio entered the service of King Ladislaus of Naples, who was at war with Florence and the Pope: at the time he had 1,200 cavalry and 1,000 infantry under him. He ravaged the lands of the Trinci of Foligno but, when Perugia accepted Ladislaus' suzerainty, Braccio sided against him and moved to Ancona, capturing Jesi.

In 1409 Braccio fought at Città di Castello, for the Florentines and then moved to Rome where he besieged Castel Sant'Angelo, returning to the Marche for the winter. In 1410 Rome was attacked by the troops of Lucas and Ladislaus of Naples, as well as by several bands of mercenaries, including Braccio's own; when the Neapolitan troops retreated from the city, he attacked and defeated them at Sora, which he also sacked. In the same year he was simultaneously at the service of Florence and Spoleto, but this did not prevent him to besiege the hateful Perugia, though in vain. The rapid movements of his troops became proverbial, and a new school of the condottieri's art, the Braccesca, was named after him.

The following year the Antipope John XXIII assigned him the fiefdom of Montone and the governorship of Bologna. Braccio took advantage of his position to extort huge sums of money from the cities of Romagna. In 1414 he fought in Todi against Sforza, who had been hired by the King of Naples; in June he entered Florence, with which he signed a pact of alliance for 10 years.

In the next August Ladislaus died, and Braccio freed Bologna after receiving a payment of 180,000 gold ducats. He thus invaded and conquered most of Umbria, his goal being again the beloved Perugia. The city gave itself to Carlo Malatesta. At the battle of Sant'Egidio (12 July 1416, later portrayed in a famous fresco by Paolo Uccello), the bracceschi were victorious, and Perugia was finally forced to open its gates to Braccio da Montone. Other Umbrian cities, such as Todi, Narni, Orvieto and Terni named him as lord: at this point, Braccio da Montone was ready to form a state for himself in central Italy. He asked the newly elected Pope Martin V to name him Papal vicar for Umbria, but Martin replied by sending against him two armies under Guidantonio da Montefeltro, from the north, and under Sforza, from the South, but Montone defeated them at Spoleto. On 14 March 1419, he met the Pope in Florence, obtaining the long-awaited title (including the lordships of Perugia, Todi, Assisi, Spello, Jesi and others) in exchange for ousting Antongaleazzo Bentivoglio from Bologna. After conquering the latter, he could finally retreat to Perugia to enjoy ruling the city which had ousted him and his family many years ago.

Sometime later the Pope excommunicated Joanna II, Queen of Naples, appointing Louis III of Anjou as heir to the crown in her stead. Joan appointed king Alfonso of Aragon as her heir, and called Braccio da Montone to fight for her. Once again Braccio found himself facing Sforza, who was at the head of the Angevine army. There was not an open battle, though Braccio's army moved all over Abruzzo. Joan gave him the lordship of Teramo, and soon after Braccio started his 13-month-long siege of L'Aquila. Meanwhile, on 3 February 1424 Braccio was appointed Gran Conestabile of the Kingdom and received the fiefdoms of Capua and Foggia. However, when the Queen of Naples abandoned the Aragonese and passed to the side of the Angevins under Louis, Braccio remained loyal to Alfonso.

The final clash between the two contenders was just below the walls of Aquila, which still resisted the siege, near the hamlet today called Bazzano.

On 2 June the battle was fought between some of the most celebrated condottieri of the time; Braccio, mortally wounded in the neck, was made prisoner and transported to L'Aquila, where he died three days later, on 5 June 1424. The Pope had him buried in unconsecrated ground because Braccio died excommunicated, in which his corpse remained until 1432 when his nephew Niccolò Fortebraccio (Note: Incidentally, accused to be the cause of his death, as Niccolò had left his position during the battle in search of personal glory.) moved it to the church of San Francesco al Prato in Perugia.

== Marriage ==
Braccio da Montone first married Elisabetta Ermanni, with whom he had three daughters.

After her death in 1419, he married Niccolina Varano. Together, they had a son:

- Carlo (b. 1421 – ?)

He also had several illegitimate children, including:

- Oddo, who also became a condottiero.
- Castora, who married Domenico Martelli.
- Camilla (also known as Innamorata), who married Francesco Piccinino.

== Bibliography ==
- Rendina, Claudio (1994). I capitani di ventura. Rome: Newton Compton.
