= Nolfo da Montefeltro =

Count of Montefeltro

Nolfo da Montefeltro (born Sighinolfo; c. 1290 – 1364) was Count of Montefeltro from 1323 to 1360. He was the son of Federico I da Montefeltro, who had been slain by the people of the city in revolt against him.

In 1323 Nolfo, now a leader of the Ghibelline part in the Marche, reconquered the city by defeating the Papal commander, Ferrantino Malatesta. His first move as lord was the assassination of all his father's enemies.

In 1333 he was named advisor by John of Bohemia and captain of the Papal Army. Nolfo annexed Borgo San Sepolcro and the fortress of San Leo, and was hired as condottiero by the Pisane, for which he occupied Lucca in 1342. In 1348 he was appointed commander-in-chief of the Republic of Venice's army against the counts of Gorizia; he was also made imperial vicar of the county of Urbino. In 1351 he was hired by Giovanni Visconti, lord of Milan. The following year he captured Cagli, but was pushed back in 1354 by the Papal commander Gil de Albornoz, sent in Italy to reconquer the fractionated Papal States.

After signing a treaty of peace, he was made Papal vicar in his lands. Nolfo died in 1364.

Preceded by Federico I	Count of Urbino; 1323–1359	Succeeded by Federico II
