= Francesco I Gonzaga =

Ruler of Mantua

- Lord of Mantua
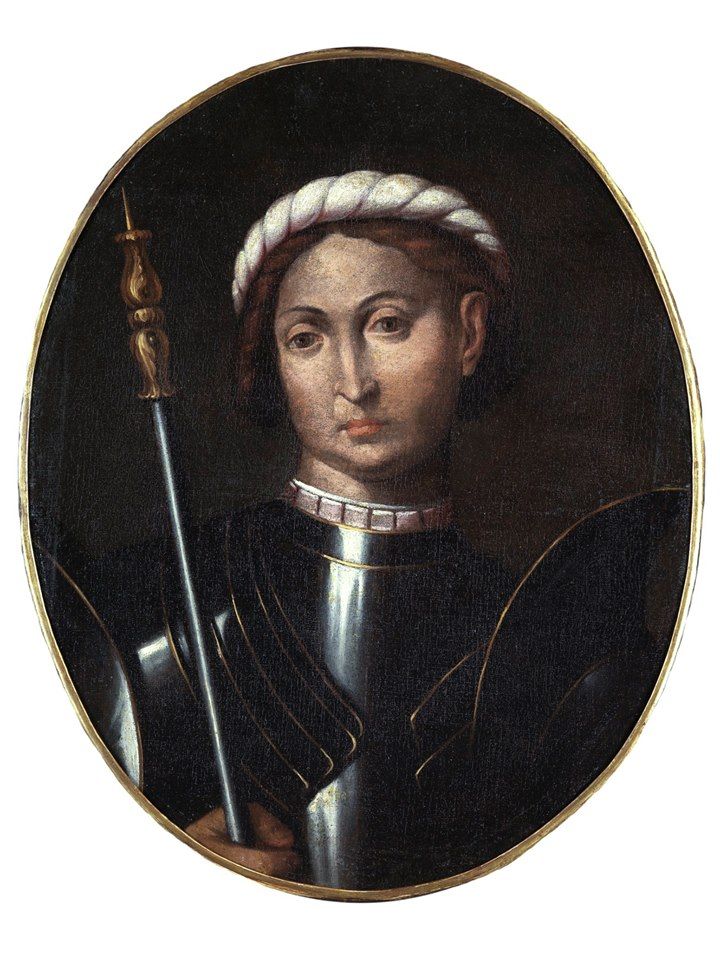
- Predecessor: Ludovico II Gonzaga
- Successor: Gianfrancesco I Gonzaga, Marquis of Mantua
- Noble family: House of Gonzaga
- Spouses: Agnese Visconti; Margherita Malatesta
- Issue: Gianfrancesco I Gonzaga
- Father: Ludovico II Gonzaga
- Mother: Alda d’Este

Francesco I Gonzaga (1366 – 7 March 1407) was ruler of Mantua from 1382 to 1407. He was also a condottiero

== Diplomatic policies towards Milan and Venice ==
Succeeding his father Ludovico II Gonzaga in 1382, he led a policy of balance between the nearby powers of the Visconti of Milan and Venice. In 1380, he married Agnese, daughter of Barnabò Visconti. When she was executed in 1391 under accusations of adultery, Francesco switched his allegiance to Venice, also to protect his land from the increasing power of Gian Galeazzo Visconti.

== Second marriage ==
In 1393, he remarried, to Margherita Malatesta, who carried in the Gonzaga family the hereditary illness of osteomalacia, which appeared periodically in Mantua's rulers until the 16th century. Francesco had subsequently to defend his lands from Gian Galeazzo's assault, but the latter's death in 1402 solved the conflict.

His son by Margherita was Gianfrancesco I.

== Building projects ==
Francesco Gonzaga is remembered as the builder of the Castle of San Giorgio, the nucleus of Ducal Palace of Mantua, the Gothic façade of the city cathedral, the bell tower of the Basilica of Sant'Andrea, as well as the Sanctuary of Santa Maria delle Grazie at Curtatone.

== Introducing the substitution cipher in his correspondence ==
Francesco Gonzaga used the earliest known example of a homophonic substitution cipher in 1401 for correspondence with one Simone de Crema.

Preceded by Ludovico II	Lord of Mantua; 1382–1407	Succeeded by Gianfrancesco I
