= Marquisate of Mantua =

Former Margraviate in northern Italy (1433-1530)

Marquisate of Mantua Marchesato di Mantova (Italian)
- 1433–1530
- Flag Coat of arms

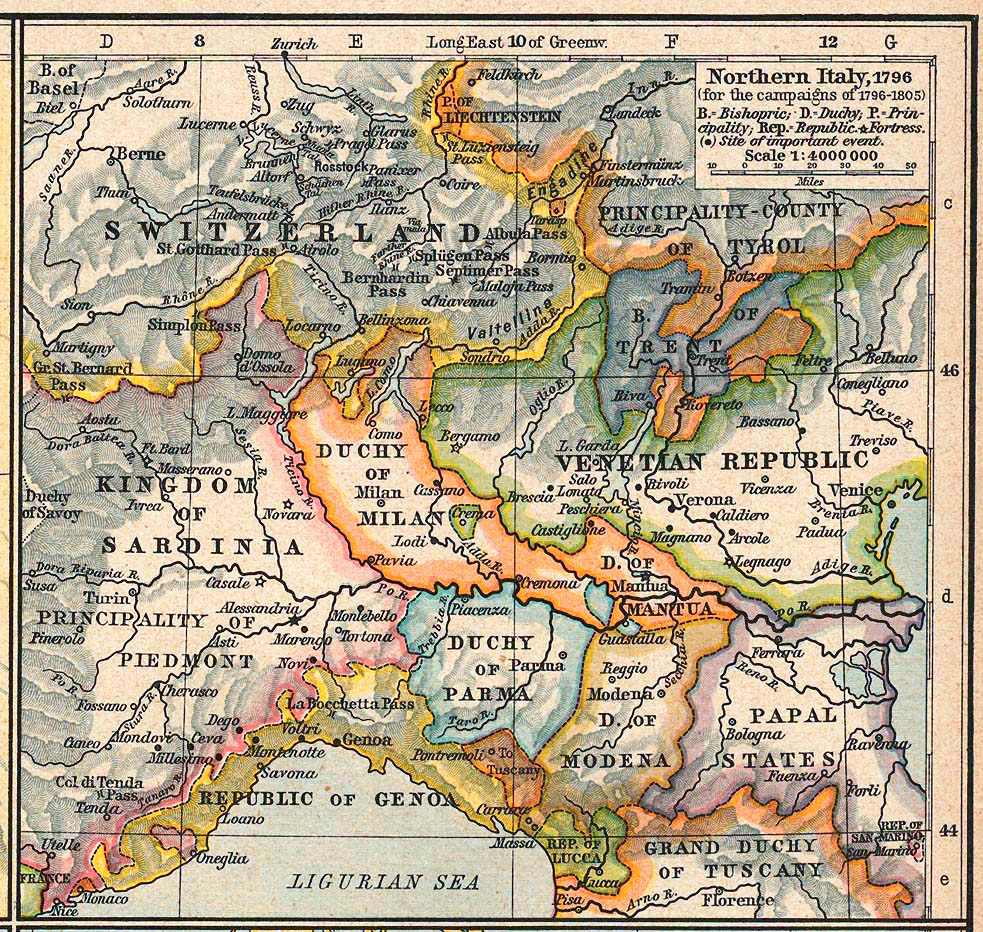
- Northern Italy in 1796; the Duchy of Mantua can be seen centre-right, shaded in orange, as part of the Duchy of Milan.
- Capital: Mantua
- Common languages: Lombard; Italian; Latin
- Religion: Roman Catholicism
- Government: Feudal monarchy
- Margrave
  - 1433–1444: Gianfrancesco I (first)
  - 1444–1478: Ludovico II
  - 1478–1484: Federico I
  - 1484–1519: Francesco II
  - 1519–1530: Federico II (last)
- Historical era: Early Modern
  - Gonzagas' uprising: 16 August 1328
  - Imperial diploma of Sigismund of Bohemia: 22 September 1433
  - Charles V raises the Margravate to Duchy: 8 April 1530
- Currency: Zecca di Mantova
Preceded by	Succeeded by
Lordship of Mantua	Duchy of Mantua
- Today part of: Italy

The Marquisate or Marquisate of Mantua (Italian: Marchesato di Mantova) was a margraviate centered around the city of Mantua in Lombardy. Ruled by the Gonzaga family from its founding in 1433, it would later be raised to the rank of Duchy in 1530.

== History ==
The Marquisate of Mantua began with Gianfrancesco I Gonzaga who, with the payment of 12,000 gold florins, in 1433 was appointed first marquis by the Emperor Sigismund, of whom he had married his niece Barbara of Brandenburg with his eldest son, Ludovico III Gonzaga. The territorial expansion of the family began with Gianfrancesco, up to occupying some border lands of today's Upper Mantua area, taken from the Brescians, and the territories of Ostiano and Isola Dovarese, wrested from the Cremonese. During the period of the Margraviate, the Gonzaga's coat of arms was enriched with the cross in red set aside by the four eagles.

From 1444 to 1478 Ludovico III ruled, which marked a first peak in the city's artistic life. Notable artists such as Andrea Mantegna, Luca Fancelli and Leon Battista Alberti were called to his court, who left an indelible mark on the history of Mantua.

In his brief marquisate, from 1478 to 1484, Federico I Gonzaga consolidated his line of friendship with the powerful Milanese Sforza dynasty, also serving as commander of the Milanese troops.

The fourth Marquis, Francesco II, renewed his alliance with the House of Este thanks to his marriage to Isabella d'Este, one of the most important women of the Renaissance and of the Italian cultural world of her time.

With Federico II Gonzaga, who succeeded his father Francesco as fifth and last Marquis of Mantua in 1519, the city experienced another period of splendour. He is remembered for the construction of Palazzo Te by Giulio Romano and the embellishment of the Palazzo Ducale.

The history of the Marquisate of Mantua ended with Federico, which lasted a century. And on 25 March 1530, with the raise of the Margraviate to Duchy by Charles V, another period began in the history of Mantua, destined to last until 1708.

== Margraves of Mantua ==
- Gianfrancesco, ruled as the first Margrave (1433–1444)
- Ludovico III (ruled 1444–78), son of Gianfrancesco
- Federico I (ruled 1478–84), son of Ludovico III
- Francesco II (ruled 1484–1519), son of Federico I
- Federico II (ruled as Margrave 1519–1530), son of Francesco II
