= Federico II da Montefeltro =

14th-century Italian nobleman

Federico II Paolo Novello da Montefeltro (died c. 1370) was the reigning Count of Urbino from 1364 until his death.

He was the son of Nolfo da Montefeltro and his wife, Margherita Gabrielli, daughter of Italian nobleman and condottiero Cante dei Gabrielli. He married Teodora Gonzaga (b. 1343), daughter of condottiero Ugolino Gonzaga by his second wife, Camilla della Gherardesca. They had four sons, of which Antonio returned to become Count of Urbino in 1364.

Preceded by Nolfo	Count of Urbino; 1364–1370	Succeeded by Antonio
