= Da Varano =

Italian noble family

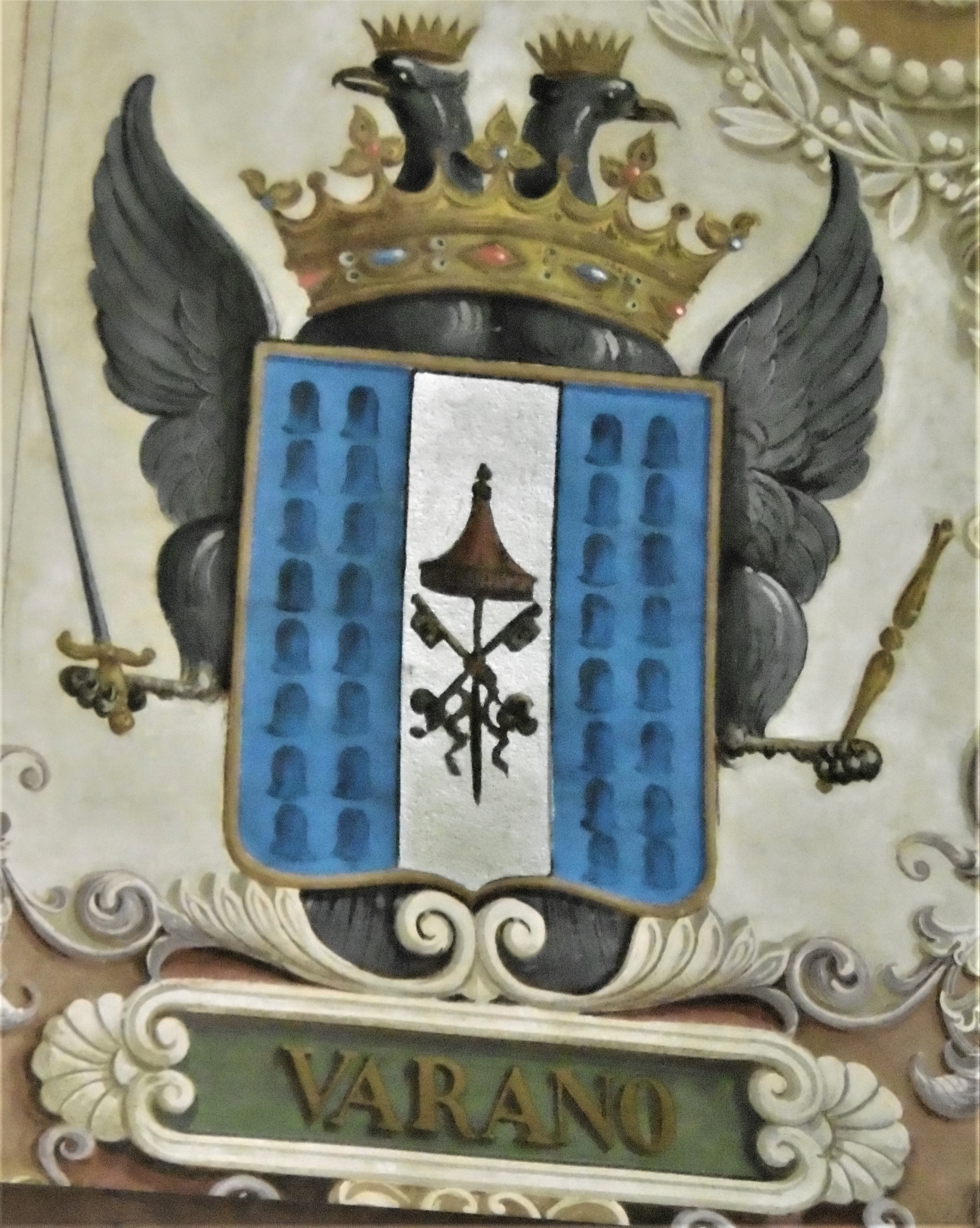
Coat of arms of the Varano family

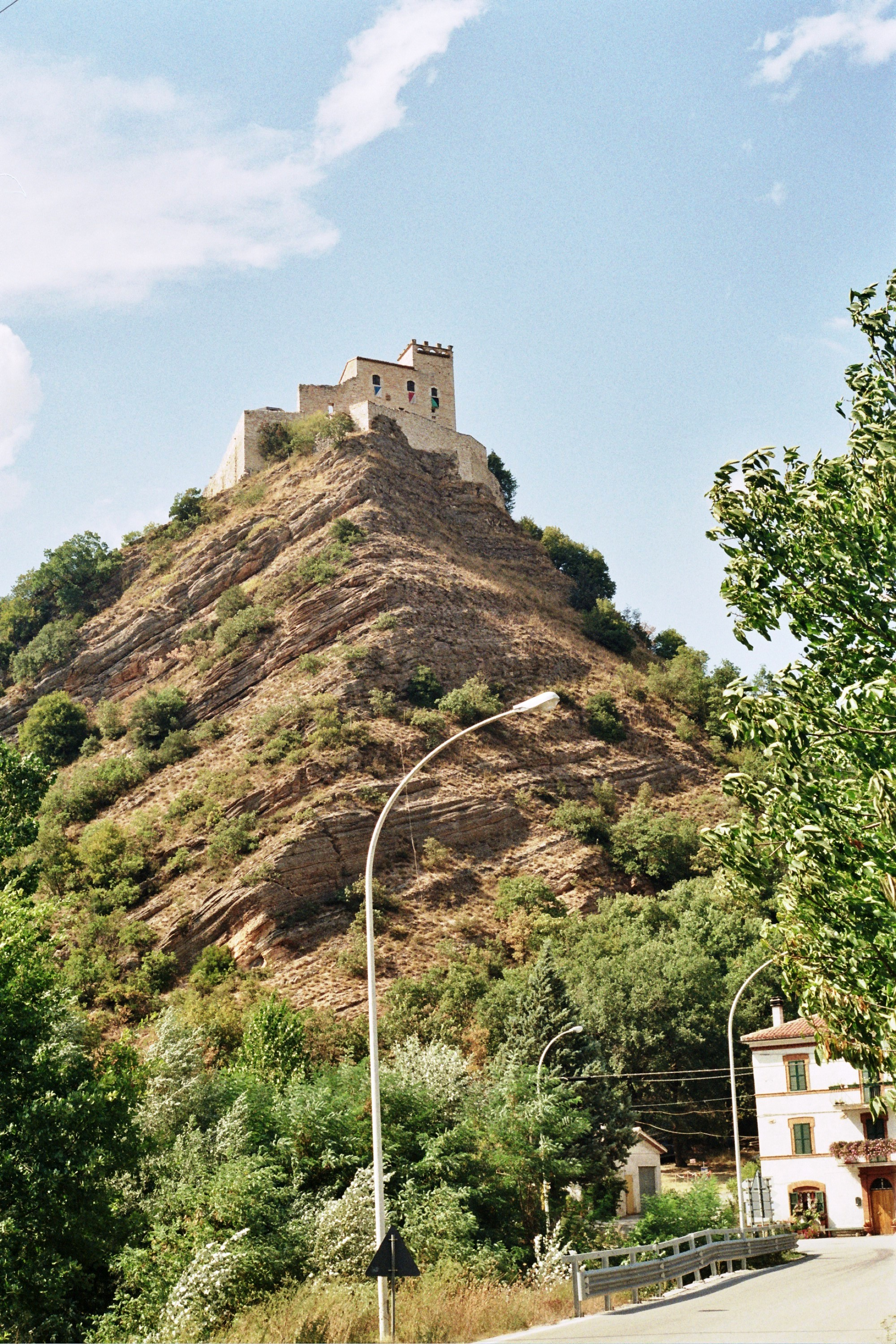
Varano Castle

The Da Varano was a prominent Italian noble family in the medieval and Renaissance history of central Italy, who became rulers of Camerino and other lands in the Marche and Umbria.

== Overview ==
The family is first mentioned in the 13th century with one Prontaguerra ("Ready-at-War") da Varano, a powerful Guelph leader, who inaugurated the traditional appartenance of the family to that party. His descendant Gentile was also a Guelph leader in Camerino when the town was destroyed by Manfred of Sicily. In the aftermath of the Ghibelline defeat at the Battle of Benevento (1266), Gentile had the town rebuilt and he became its lord. He was made "Count of the Roman Campagna" by Pope Martin IV (1282), a title which was inherited by his son Rodolfo after Gentile's death two years later. Rodolfo was also capitano del popolo in Lucca.

Rodolfo's brother, Berardo, was commander of the papal army for Boniface VIII against the troops sent to Rome by King Philip IV of France. In 1316 Rodolfo died and Berardo became lord of Camerino; three years later he was made "Marquis of Ancona" by pope John XXI, for which he reconquered the territories of the Papal States in the Marche (Urbino, Fano, Osimo and Recanati). In 1322 he died and was succeeded by his son Gentile, who added Tolentino, Gualdo Tadino and San Ginesio to the family's lands.

At Gentile's death in 1355 Camerino and the da Varano territories went to his grandson Rodolfo, who supported cardinal Gil de Albornoz's campaign of reconquest of the Papal States against the local barons. Created gonfaloniere of the Roman Church by Pope Innocent IV, he won several battles against the league of the Ordelaffi and Visconti families. He was later commander of the Florentine army and fought against Bernabò Visconti.

Rodolfo died heirless in 1384. His brother Giovanni, also heirless, ruled briefly in Camerino until 1385, being succeeded by the last brother, Gentile III, who continued to traditional pro-Papal policy of the da Varano, obtaining the title of Senator of Rome in 1362. In 1393 his son Rodolfo III, a skilled condottiero, succeeded him, gaining the town of Civitanova and supporting king Ladislaus of Naples during his reign.

His death begin the decline of the family, which was weakened by the struggle of power between his members. This ended only in 1444 when Rodolfo IV conquered Camerino; he was however forced to give back Tolentino. His son Giulio Cesare was a capable military leader, but could do little against the assault of Cesare Borgia (the son of Pope Alexander VI) who in 1502 captured and killed him, together with his sons Vincenzo, Annibale and Pirro. The last surviving son, Giovanni Maria, could return in Camerino after the fall of the Borgia. In 1515 he was created Duke of Camerino. He died without heirs in 1529, and the family's lands were annexed to the Duchy of Urbino. {The daughter of the Lord of Camerino Giulia da Varano was married to the Duke of Urbino Guidobaldo II della Rovere}.

Ercole, a son of Rodolfo IV, attempted in vain to reconquer Camerino. His son Mattia was more successful, but was also ousted after a short rule. Piergentile da Varano was the last member of the family to attempt reconquer Camerino in 1549, but again without success.

== Saint Camilla Battista da Varano ==
Saint Camilla Battista da Varano, O.S.C., (April 9, 1458 – May 31, 1524), from Camerino, was an Italian princess and a Poor Clare nun and abbess. She was canonized as a saint in the Catholic Church.
