= Antonia Visconti =

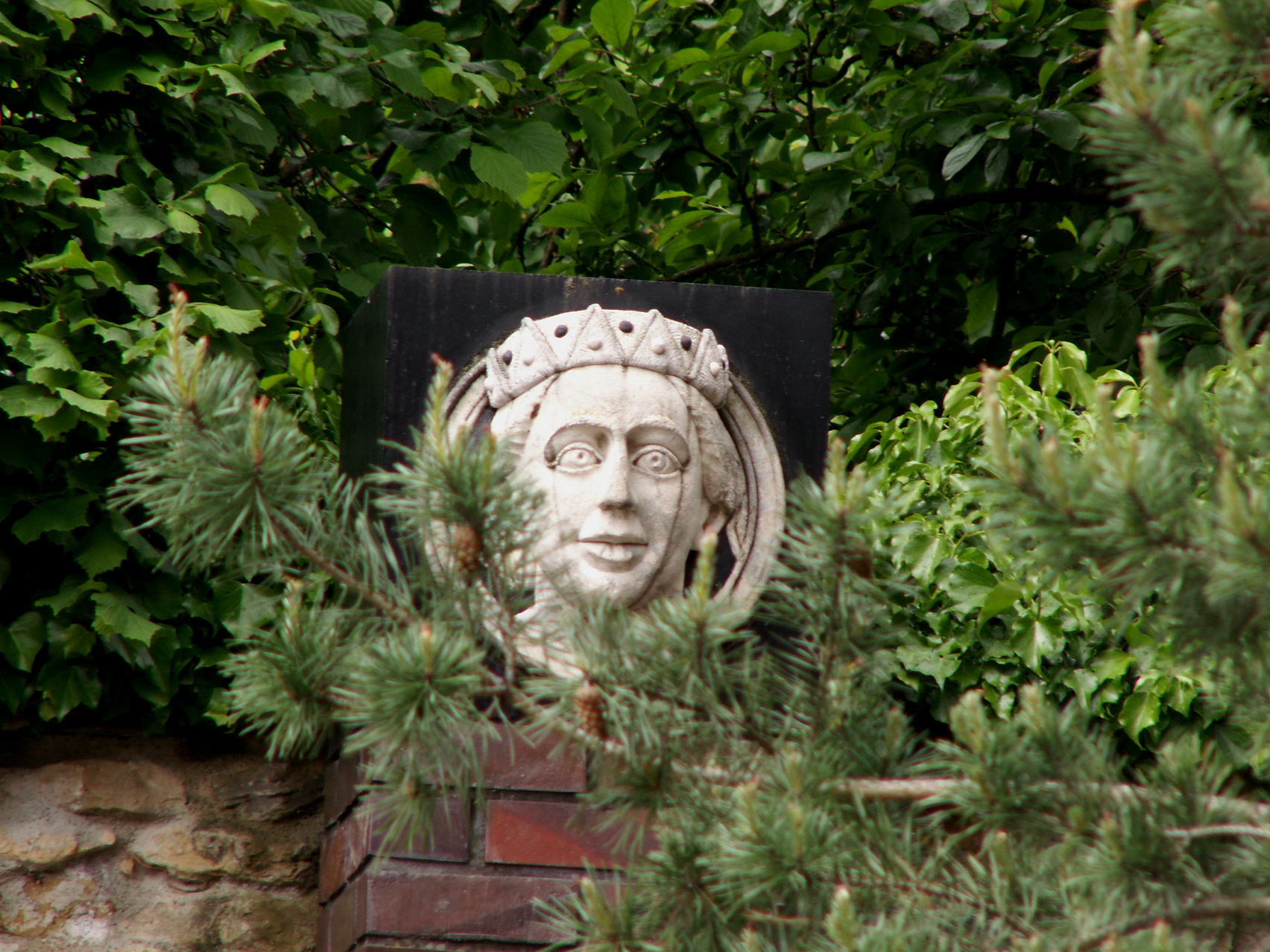
- Head relief of Antonia Visconti in Villa Visconti, Bietigheim-Bissingen, Baden-Württemberg, Germany
- Born: born after 1350, probably about 1360; Milan, Italy
- Died: 16 March 1405 (aged 55/45); Old Castle, Stuttgart, County of Württemberg
- Resting place: Stuttgart Stiftskirche (Stuttgart Collegiate Church)
- Title: Countess of Württemberg
- Spouse: Eberhard III, Count of Württemberg (m. 1380)
- Children: Eberhard IV, Count of Württemberg
- Parent(s): Bernabò Visconti; Beatrice Regina della Scala

Antonia Visconti (born after 1350, probably about 1360, Milan – 16 March 1405, Stuttgart) was Countess of Württemberg.

== Family ==
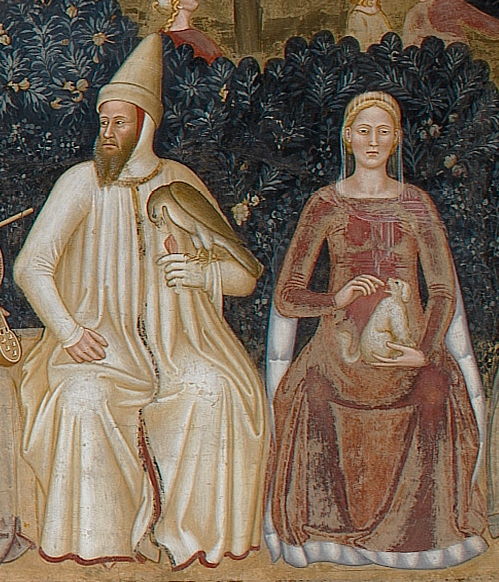
Beatrice Regina della Scala and her husband Bernabò Visconti, the parents of Antonia Visconti, later Countess of Württemberg, wife of Eberhard III, Count of Württemberg, detail of a fresco by Andrea di Bonaiuto da Firenze from the Cappella Spagnuolo, Santa Maria Novella, Florence

Antonia was the tenth of 17 children of Bernabò Visconti, Lord of Milan. She was one of the 13 legitimately born children from his marriage to Beatrice Regina della Scala from the Scaliger family, the lords of Verona.

Antonia's sister Taddea Visconti married Stephen III, Duke of Bavaria and was mother of Isabeau of Bavaria, wife of Charles VI of France and ancestor to some notable people in history, including the Tudor Dynasty. Another sister, Agnes, married Francesco I Gonzaga and was executed for supposed adultery in 1391. Antonia's youngest sister Elisabetta was married to Ernest, Duke of Bavaria.

Antonia's maternal grandparents were Mastino II della Scala and his wife Taddea da Carrara. Her paternal grandparents were Stefano Visconti and his wife Valentina Doria.

Her father Bernabò was a cruel and ruthless despot, and an implacable enemy of the Church. He seized the papal city of Bologna, rejected the Pope and his authority, confiscated ecclesiastical property, and forbade any of his subjects to have any dealings with the Curia. He was excommunicated as a heretic in 1363 by Pope Urban V, who preached crusade against him. When Bernabò was in one of his frequent rages, only Beatrice Regina (her mother) was able to approach him.

== Marriage ==
Antonia was originally betrothed to Frederick III the Simple. This was different from other family marriages because most of Antonia's sisters married members of the House of Wittelsbach. Ten years after the first suggestion of marriage, a marriage contract was drawn up, Antonia's family was to provide a dowry of ten thousand florins plus another twenty thousand in florins jewelry. However, Antonia never married Frederick because he died 27 January 1377 before the marriage could take place. Antonia could have become Queen consort of Sicily if she had married Frederick.

Antonia married, on 27 October 1380, to Eberhard III, Count of Württemberg, in Bad Urach. Antonia laid out water gardens in their castle grounds, known as "der Frau von Mailand Garten".

Antonia and Eberhard had three sons, but only one lived to adulthood:

- Eberhard IV, Count of Württemberg, (23 August 1388, Stuttgart–2 July 1419, Waiblingen), successor to his father.
- Ulrich (died young)
- Ludwig (died young)

Antonia and Eberhard were married for twenty-five years. On 26 March 1405 Antonia died at Old Castle (Stuttgart), leaving behind her husband and only surviving son. Eberhard remarried after Antonia's death to Elisabeth, daughter of John III, Burgrave of Nuremberg and Margaret of Bohemia. They had a daughter, also called Elisabeth.

Tests were done on the genetics of the House of Württemberg by Gerhard O. Schwerdfeger. There were cases of mental illness in the family and according to Schwerdfeger the gene came from the House of Visconti. Otto of Bavaria and Ludwig II of Bavaria both had a mental disorder, they are both descended from Antonia. Antonia's father, did have frequent rages.

== Ancestry ==
Ancestors of Antonia Visconti

16. Teobaldo Visconti
8. Matteo I Visconti
17. Anastasia Pirovano
4. Stefano Visconti
18. Squarcina Borri
9. Bonacossa Borri
19. Antonia
2. Bernabò Visconti
20. Brancaleone Doria
10. Bernabò Doria
21. Caterina Zancha
5. Valentina Doria
22. Federico Fieschi
11. Eliana Fieschi
23. Chiara
1. Antonia Visconti
24. Alberto I della Scala
12. Alboino I della Scala
25. Verde di Salizzole
6. Mastino II della Scala
26. Gilberto III da Correggio
13. Beatrice da Correggio
27. Elena Malaspina
3. Beatrice Regina della Scala
28. Marsilio III da Carrara
14. Jacopo I da Carrara
29. ... di Carturo
7. Taddea da Carrara
30. Pietro Gradenigo
15. Anna Gradenigo
31. Tommasina Morosini
