= Anglesia Visconti =

- Queen Consort of Cyprus
- Visconti coat-of-arms
- Tenure: (1401–1407)
- Born: 1377
- Died: 1439 (aged 61–62)
- Spouse: Janus, King of Cyprus (m. 1401–1407)
- House: Visconti of Milan
- Father: Bernabò Visconti
- Mother: Beatrice Regina della Scala

Anglesia Visconti (1377–1439) was a queen consort of Cyprus by marriage to King Janus. She was the daughter of Bernabò Visconti, Lord of Milan and Beatrice Regina della Scala, daughter of Mastino II lord of Verona.

== Life ==
Anglesia was the daughter of Bernabò Visconti, Lord of Milan, and Beatrice Regina della Scala, daughter of Mastino II lord of Verona.

Anglesia's father utilized his many children to make politically advantageous marriages and gain allies. A betrothal between Anglesia and Frederick the youngest son of Frederick V of Nuremberg was negotiated when she was a young child.

Three of Anglesia's sisters, Antonia, Elisabetta and Maddalena, were married to Eberhard III, Count of Württemberg, Albert III, Duke of Bavaria and Frederick, Duke of Bavaria, respectively. The marriage to Frederick did not take place for unknown reasons; he later married Anglesia's niece Elisabeth of Bavaria.

In 1383, Anglesia's mother Beatrice died, and two years later, her father Bernabo died, after being imprisoned by his nephew (and son-in-law) Gian Galeazzo Visconti. It was suspected that he had been poisoned by Gian Galeazzo, who then declared himself duke of Milan.

Despite the downfall of her father, Anglesia was seen as a very eligible bride. Her sister Caterina Visconti was also now duchess of Milan by marriage to Gian Galeazzo. Anglesia then lived in the castle at Pavia at the court of Caterina and Gian Galeazzo and her still unmarried sisters Lucia and Elisabetta.

In 1398, another marriage negotiation on behalf of Anglesia was initiated; this time to marry Frederick I, Elector of Saxony or one of his brothers Wilhelm or Georg.

Marriage

Anglesia became queen consort of Cyprus, through marriage to King Janus of Cyprus, some time after January 1400. His cousin and predecessor Peter II had been married to her elder sister Valentina Visconti. (d. 1393)

After her marriage, Anglesia was renamed Heloise. The marriage was annulled between 1407 and 1409 without issue.

After the annulment of the marriage, Anglesia returned to Milan. By this time, her sister Caterina Visconti was already dead after having been imprisoned and then poisoned by her son and Anglesia's nephew Gian Maria Visconti, who now ruled Milan.

Gian Maria gave Anglesia property in Selvanesco so that she would be economically supported, but after his assassination in 1412 and on the succession of his younger brother and her nephew Filippo Maria Visconti, she was ordered to return the property and to enter a convent in Pavia.

Through an inheritance which she received in 1424, she was able to leave the convent, and settled in Reggio Emilia together with her half-sister Isotta.

== Death ==
Anglesia died in October 1439 in Milan.

Royal titles
Preceded by Helvis of Brunswick-Grubenhagen	Queen consort of Cyprus; 1401–1407	Succeeded by Charlotte de Bourbon
