= Viridis Visconti =

Duchess of Austria (1354–1414)

- Duchess of Austria
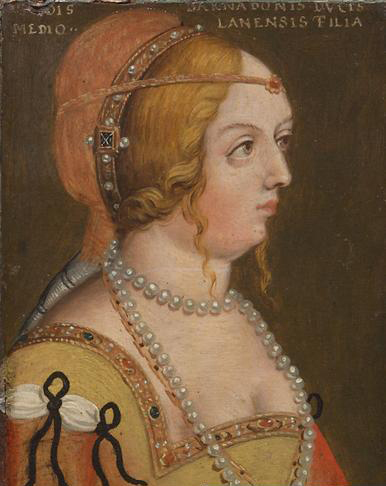
- Portrait of Viridis Visconti by Anton Boys
- Born: c. 1352; Milan, Italy
- Died: 1 March 1414 (aged 61-62); Stična Abbey, Windic March
- Spouse: Leopold III, Duke of Austria
- Issue: William; Leopold IV; Ernest the Iron; Frederick IV
- House: Visconti (by birth)
- Father: Bernabò Visconti
- Mother: Beatrice Regina della Scala

Viridis Visconti (1354–1414) was an Italian noblewoman. Upon her marriage to Leopold III, Duke of Austria, she was Duchess consort of Austria, Styria and Carinthia, and was also Countess consort of Tyrol.

== Life ==
Born in c.1354, Viridis was born in Milan, daughter of the Lord of Milan, Bernabò Visconti, and Beatrice Regina della Scala. She was likely named after her maternal aunt Verde della Scala.

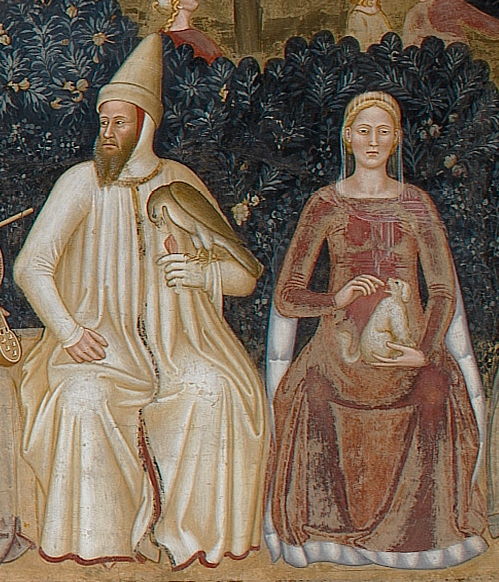
Parents of Viridis by Andrea di Bonaiuto

Viridis and the rest of her sisters secured politically advantageous marriages. She was seen as a very eligible bride, as not only did the Visconti family rule over the extremely wealthy region of Lombardy by her father Bernabò strategically marrying off his many children, whom he systematically married to members of the nobility, so he had a network of relatives among the leading families of the Empire.

Thus in 1365, she was betrothed to the 14 year old Leopold. She brought 100 000 florins as dowry. The marriage was arranged by the groom's brother Rudolf II, Duke of Austria, who allying themselves through marriage with the powerful Viscontis, the Habsburgs found an ally in their efforts to secure their rule in Tyrol. Rudolf, however, died on his way to attend the marriage of Viridis and Leopold in Milan. Viridis husband therefore came to co-rule Austria with his brother Albrecht.

They were married on 23 February 1365 in the Bernabo palace at the church San Giovanni in Conca. Her parents gifted her a Tacuinum Sanitatis around this time.

Viridis and her husband lived at Tyrol Castle near Merano

In 1385, her father was deposed by her cousin Gian Galeazzo Visconti and brother-in-law through having married her sister Caterina Visconti. Bernabo was then imprisoned in the castle of Trezzo and died on 19 December of that year, presumably poisoned.

== Marriage ==
Viridis married Leopold III, Duke of Austria, son of Albert II, Duke of Austria, and Johanna of Pfirt.

The couple had:

1. William the Courteous
2. Leopold IV the Fat
3. Ernest the Iron
4. Frederick IV of the Empty Pockets
5. Elisabeth (1378–1392)
6. Margaretha (1370–?)
7. Catherine (1385–?), Abbess of St. Klara in Vienna

Viridis was widowed in 1386, and her eldest son William became Duke of Austria.

She was a long time benefactor of the Stična Abbey, and often lend money to the abbot of the monastery. As widow, she resided on a property close to the convent.

== Death ==
Viridis died on 1 March 1414 and out-lived at least three of seven children, since her younger daughter Katherine's date of death is unknown. She is buried in Sittich, Karnten, Austria.

== Ancestry ==
Ancestors of Viridis Visconti

8. Matteo I Visconti
4. Stefano Visconti
9. Bonacossa Borri
2. Bernabò Visconti
10. Bernabò Doria
5. Valentina Doria
11. Eliana Fieschi
1. Viridis Visconti
12. Alboino I della Scala
6. Mastino II della Scala
13. Beatrice da Correggio
3. Beatrice Regina della Scala
14. Jacopo I da Carrara
7. Taddea da Carrara
15. Anna Gradenigo

== Sources ==
- Antenhofer, Christina; Schober, Richard, eds. (2021). Tiroler Heimat 86 (2022): Zeitschrift für Regional- und Kulturgeschichte Nord-, Ost- und Sudtirols (in German). Universitätsverlag Wagner.
- Margolis, Oren (2016). The Politics of Culture in Quattrocento Europe: René of Anjou in Italy. Oxford University Press.
- Wilson, Peter (2016). Heart of Europe: A History of the Holy Roman Empire. Harvard University Press.
- York, Laura (1999). "Visconti, Virida (c.1354-1414)". In Commire, Anne; Klezmer, Deborah (eds.). Women in World History: A Biographical Encyclopedia. Vol. 16:Vict-X. Yorkin Publishing.
