= Beatrice Regina della Scala =

Lady of Milan (1331–1384)

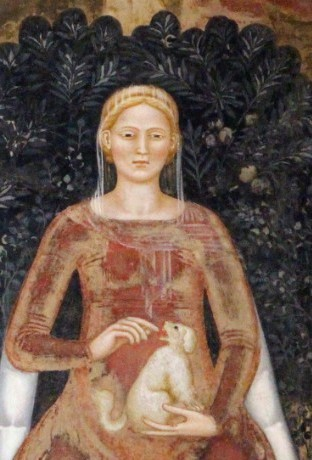
- Portrait fresco in the Basilica of Santa Maria Novella, c. 1366
- Born: 1331; Verona, Lordship of Verona
- Died: 18 June 1384 (aged 52–53); Milan, Lordship of Milan
- Noble family: della Scala
- Spouse: Bernabò Visconti (m. 1350)
- Issue among others...: Taddea, Duchess of Bavaria-Ingolstadt; Viridis, Duchess of Inner Austria; Antonia, Countess of Württemberg; Valentina, Queen of Cyprus; Caterina, Duchess of Milan; Agnese, Lady of Mantua; Maddalena, Duchess of Bavaria-Landshut; Anglesia, Queen of Cyprus; Elisabetta, Duchess of Bavaria-Munich; Lucia, Countess of Kent
- Father: Mastino II della Scala
- Mother: Taddea da Carrara

Beatrice Regina della Scala (1331 – 18 June 1384) was Lady of Milan by marriage to Bernabò Visconti, Lord of Milan, and politically active as the adviser of her husband.

== Life ==
Beatrice Regina was the youngest child of Mastino II della Scala and Taddea da Carrara. She had three older brothers and one sister, as well as five illegitimate half-siblings. Her father, who was a member of the Scaliger family of Northern Italy, was Lord of Verona, Vicenza, Brescia, Parma, and Lucca.

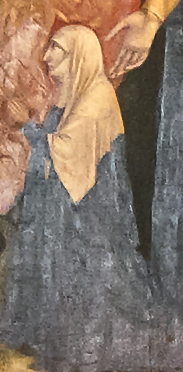
Taddea da Carrara, mother of Beatrice

Her paternal grandparents were Alboino I della Scala and Beatrice, daughter of Gilberto III da Correggio of Parma, and her maternal grandparents were Jacopo I da Carrara and Anna Gradenigo, daughter of Pietro Gradenigo, Doge of Venice and Tommasina Morosini.

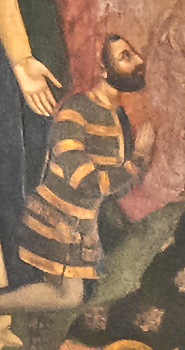
Mastino II della Scala father of Beatrice

Beatrice's mother, Taddea, had been married off to Mastino as a way to keep peace between the da Carraras and the della Scala families, but this failed thus Beatrice grew up within a milieu of martial conflict between her relatives. By the time of Beatrice's birth the della Scala family had expanded their territory to contain Padua in the north to Treviso in the east. The personal fortune of the family was also large and comparable to that of the king of France.

The neighbouring lords of the family felt threatened by the della Scalas and formed a league and in quick succession conquered large parts of the della Scala territories. At the end of this assault in 1339, Beatrice's father was left holding only two cities; Verona and Vicenza

Mastino in order to protect the lands he had left sought to ally himself with Taddeo Pepoli, lord of Bologna, and in 1342, aged eleven years of age, Beatrice was betrothed to Taddeo's nephew, Andrea dei Pepoli, governor of Piacenza.

However, in the late 1340s, Mastino encountered threats to his lands from Milan, and its new lord Giovanni Visconti. The Viscontis were aggressively pursuing territory from their neighbours. By having Mastino's daughter Beatrice marry his nephew, Bernabo Visconti, they would be allies instead. The betrothal between Beatrice and Andrea dei Pepoli was broken off.

=== Lady of Milan ===
On 27 September 1350, in Verona, Beatrice Regina was married to Bernabò Visconti, son of Stefano Visconti and Valentina Doria. She was nineteen years of age and he was twenty-seven. The marriage had been arranged between Beatrice's father and Giovanni Visconti, the ruling lord of Milan and paternal uncle of Bernabò. It would cement a powerful political alliance between Milan and Verona. Bernabò assumed power as Lord of Milan in 1354, henceforth, Beatrice Regina was styled as Lady of Milan.

Beatrice is said to have had "all the graces that the heavens bestow on women".

The name of Regina, and its variations Reina and Rayna, is said to have been added to her name because of her regal bearing. Later historians would accuse her of arrogance in wanting to be called "queen" despite not having legitimate claim to such a title.

In 1351 Beatrice gave birth to her first child, a daughter named Taddea after the baby's maternal grandmother.

==== Family ====
In 1351, barely a year after Beatrice's marriage to Bernabò, her father Mastino della Scala died and was succeeded by her brother Cangrande.

In 1359, Cansignorio, the older brother of Beatrice, assassinated their brother Cangrande and succeeded him as lord of Verona. Beatrice's youngest brother Paolo Alboino then ruled together with Cangrande. On 20 February 1365 Paolo Alboino was arrested on charges of conspiracy against Cansignorio and was imprisoned. Then in 1375 he was killed on his brother's orders, so that Cansignorio's sons, Beatrice's nephews Antonio and Bartolomeo could succeed him. The latter, however, were forced by the city of Verona's bankruptcy to accept the protectorate of their uncle-in-law Bernabò.

The only legitimate sibling of Beatrice still alive after 1375 was her sister Verde (wife Niccolo II d´Este) The families of d´Estes and Viscontis had been in conflict since around the time of their marriage. However, the marriages of Beatrice and of her sister Verde to members of the rival families seems for a time to have guaranteed a period of intermittent and relative peace between the two rival families.

Beatrice's brother-in-law Niccolò II d'Este, however, would join forces with Verona and Padua against Beatrice's husband in 1367, when Bernabò led his forces to attack and attempted to take claim of the city of Padua on behalf of Beatrice's claim of succession.

It has been claimed that Bernabò was a cruel and ruthless despot, and an implacable enemy of the Church. He seized the papal city of Bologna, rejected the Pope and his authority, confiscated ecclesiastical property, and forbade any of his subjects from having any dealings with the Curia. He was excommunicated as a heretic in 1363 by Pope Urban V, who preached crusade against him. When Bernabò was in one of his frequent rages, only Beatrice Regina was able to approach him. She reportedly had a strong will, and her influence upon Bernabò - and thereby upon the policy of Milan - was recognized: Catherine of Siena used her as an intermediary whenever she had a political request to Bernabò.

After the conquest of Reggio Emilia in 1356, control over the city was given to Beatrice, with Bernabò stating that all concerns should be addressed to his wife rather than to him. Beatrice thereafter handled audiences and decided appeals brought before her.

Despite his close relationship with Beatrice, Bernabò was frequently unfaithful and apart from the many children he had with Beatrice he would also father numerous illegitimate children.

=== Death ===
Beatrice Regina died on 18 June 1384 at the age of fifty-three years. She was buried in Milan and entombed in San Giovanni in Conca . Bernabòn then imposed two years of mourning to all Milanese citizens.

A year and a half later, her husband was deposed and later poisoned by his nephew and son-in-law Gian Galeazzo Visconti, who in 1395 became the first Duke of Milan.

In 1892 Beatrice's and her husband's remains were removed from San Giovanni in Conca and transferred to Sant'Alessandro in Zebedia.

== Legacy ==
She gave her name to the church of Santa Maria alla Scala in Milan, and by extension, the La Scala opera house (Teatro alla Scala) which was built on the same site four hundred years later.

== Issue ==
Together Beatrice Regina and Bernabò had at least between 15 and 17 documented children:

1. Taddea Visconti (1351 – 28 September 1381), married on 13 October 1364 Stephen III, Duke of Bavaria, by whom she had three children including Isabeau of Bavaria, Queen consort of King Charles VI of France
2. Verde Visconti (1352 – bef. 11 March 1414), married on 23 February 1365 Leopold III, Duke of Inner Austria, by whom she had six children.
3. Marco Visconti (November 1353 – 3 January 1382), Lord of Parma in 1364; married in 1367 Elisabeth of Bavaria, by whom he had one daughter.
4. Antonia Visconti (ca. 1354 – 26 March 1405), engaged in 1366 to King Frederick III of Sicily, but he died before the wedding took place; married 27 October 1380 Eberhard III, Count of Wurttemberg, by whom she had three sons.
5. Valentina Visconti (ca. 1357 – bef. September 1393), married in September 1378 King Peter II of Cyprus, by whom she had one daughter who died in early infancy.
6. Lodovico Visconti (1358 – 7 March 1404), Governor and Lord of Parma during 1364–1404 and Governor of Lodi during 1379–1385; married in November 1381 Violante Visconti, widow of Lionel of Antwerp and Secondotto, Marquess of Montferrat. They had a son, Giovanni, who possibly left descendants: the family Milano-Visconti, Reichsfreiherren at Utrecht claim descent from him.
7. Carlo Visconti (September 1359 – August 1403), Lord Cremona, Borgo San Donnino and Parma in 1379; married Beatrice of Armagnac, daughter of John II, Count of Armagnac and Jeanne de Périgord, by whom he had four children.
8. Caterina Visconti (1361 – 17 October 1404), married on 2 October 1380 as his second wife, Gian Galeazzo Visconti 1st Duke of Milan, by whom she had two sons, Gian Maria Visconti, 2nd Duke of Milan; and Filippo Maria Visconti, 3rd Duke of Milan, who fathered Bianca Maria Visconti by his mistress Agnese del Maino.
9. Agnese Visconti (1362 – 7 February 1391), married 26 September 1380 Francesco I Gonzaga, by whom she had one daughter. Agnes was executed for alleged adultery.
10. Rodolfo Visconti (ca. 1364 – January 1389), Lord of Bergamo, Soncino and Ghiara d'Adda in 1379. Unmarried.
11. Maddalena Visconti (ca. 1366 – 17 July 1404), married 9 April 1382 Frederick, Duke of Bavaria, by whom she had five children including Henry XVI of Bavaria.
12. Anglesia Visconti (ca. 1368 – 12 October 1439), married in January 1400 King Janus of Cyprus, but the union was childless and was dissolved 1407/1409; he married in 1411 as his second wife, Charlotte de Bourbon-La Marche by whom he had six children.
13. Mastino Visconti (March 1371 – 19 June 1405), Lord of Bergamo, Valcamonica and Ghiaradadda in 1405; married in 1385 to his cousin Cleofa della Scala daughter of his maternal uncle Cangrande II della Scala, by whom he had three children.
14. Elisabetta Visconti (1374 – 2 February 1432), married on 26 January 1395 Ernest, Duke of Bavaria, by whom she had five children including Albert III, Duke of Bavaria.
15. Lucia Visconti (ca. 1380 – 14 April 1424), married firstly on 28 June 1399 Frederick of Thuringia (future Elector of Saxony) but the union was dissolved on grounds of non-consummation shortly after; married secondly on 24 January 1407 Edmund Holland, 4th Earl of Kent. No issue.

== Sources ==
- de Mesquita, D. M. Bueno (1941). Giangaleazzo Visconti, Duke of Milan (1351-1402): A Study in the Political. Cambridge University Press.
- Rapelli, Paola (2011). Symbols of Power in Art. Getty Publications.
- Tuchman, Barbara W. (1978). A Distant Mirror. Alfred A. Knopf Inc.

Preceded by Bianca of Savoy	Lady of Milan; 1350–1384	Succeeded by Caterina Visconti
