= Maddalena Visconti =

Duchess of Bavaria-Landshut (1366–1404)

- Born: 1366
- Died: 17 July 1404 (aged 37–38); Burghausen
- Noble family: House of Visconti
- Spouse: Frederick, Duke of Bavaria
- Issue: Henry XVI the Rich; John; Elizabeth; Margareta; Magdalene
- Father: Bernabò Visconti
- Mother: Beatrice Regina della Scala

Maddalena Visconti (1366 – 17 July 1404) was the daughter of Bernabò Visconti and Beatrice Regina della Scala. She was Duchess of Bavaria-Landshut by her marriage to Frederick, Duke of Bavaria.

== Family ==
Maddalena was born in Milan and was the twelfth of seventeen children born to her parents.

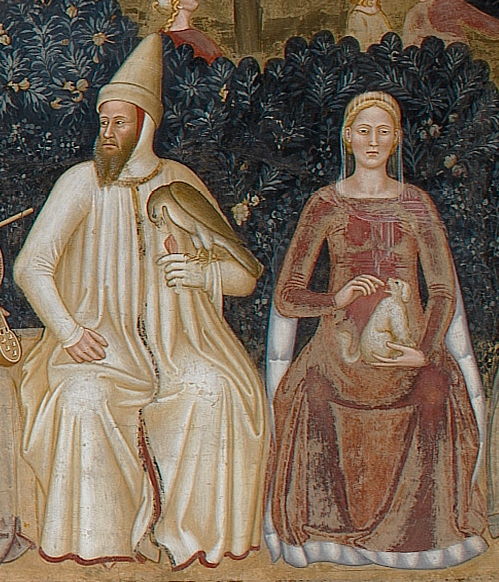
Maddalena's parents Bernabò Visconti and Beatrice Regina della Scala

Maddalena's maternal grandparents were Mastino II della Scala and his wife Taddea da Carrara. Her paternal grandparents were Stefano Visconti and his wife Valentina Doria.

Her father Bernabò was a cruel and ruthless despot, and an implacable enemy of the Church. He seized the papal city of Bologna, rejected the Pope and his authority, confiscated ecclesiastical property, and forbade any of his subjects to have any dealings with the Curia. He was excommunicated as a heretic in 1363 by Pope Urban V, who preached crusade against him. When Bernabò was in one of his frequent rages, only her mother Beatrice Regina was able to approach him.

== Marriage ==
Maddalena married on 2 September 1381 Frederick, Duke of Bavaria. Her father wanted to improve relations with Bavaria so married his three daughters: Maddalena, Elisabetta, and Taddea to the three rival Dukes. Frederick had been previously married to Anna of Neuffen, with whom he had a daughter, Isabella of Bavaria, but no sons. On Anna's death, Frederick married Maddalena.

The couple had five children:

1. Henry XVI the Rich (1386–1450).
2. Johann, died young.
3. Elisabeth (1383–13 November 1442, Ansbach), married to Frederick I, Margrave of Brandenburg.
4. Margareta (b. 1384), died young.
5. Magdalene (1388–1410), married 1404 to Count Johann Meinhard VII of Görz.

Maddalena's stepdaughter Isabella was married to one of Maddalena's brothers, Marco Visconti, Lord of Parma.

From 1375 to 1392 Frederick ruled with his brothers Stephen III and John II. Maddalena ruled as consort jointly with her sister Taddea, but only for a few weeks, before Taddea died. John II's wife was Catherine of Gorizia. It is unknown whether Maddalena and Catherine served as consort at the same time.

Frederick managed to administer the richest part of the duchy, Lower Bavaria-Landshut which he also kept after the division of Bavaria among the brothers in 1392 when Bavaria-Ingolstadt and Bavaria-Munich were created.

In 1387 Frederick imprisoned the archbishop of Salzburg to force him to finish his alliance with a confederation of cities in Swabia. Frederick was an advisor of King Wenceslaus in legal affairs and a favorable candidate for the king's succession when he died at Budweis already in 1393. He was succeeded in Bavaria-Landshut by his son with Maddalena, Henry, leaving Maddalena a widow.

Henry inherited not only the black hair of Maddalena but also the despotic temperament of her family, the Visconti. Henry very cruelly oppressed uprisings of the citizenry of Landshut in 1410 and fought successfully against his cousin Louis VII the Bearded, the duke of Bavaria-Ingolstadt. He united Louis’ enemies in the Parakeet Society of 1414 and the League of Constance of 1415.

Maddalena died in Burghausen, Bavaria on 17 July 1404. She is buried at Raitenhaslach Monastery.

Maddalena Visconti House of Visconti Born: 1366 Died: 17 July 1404
Preceded by Anna of Neuffen	Duchess of Bavaria-Landshut; 1381–1393	Succeeded by Margaret of Austria
