= Agnese Visconti =

Italian noblewoman

- Lady consort of Mantua
- Born: 1363; Milan
- Died: 7 February 1391 (aged 27–28); Mantua
- Cause of death: Decapitation
- Buried: Piazza Pallone, Ducal Palace of Mantua
- Noble family: Visconti
- Spouse: Francesco I Gonzaga
- Issue: Alda Gonzaga
- Father: Bernabò Visconti
- Mother: Beatrice Regina della Scala

Agnese Visconti, also known as Agnes (1363 – 7 February 1391), was the daughter of Bernabò Visconti and Beatrice Regina della Scala. She was the consort of Mantua by her marriage to Francesco I Gonzaga.

== Family ==
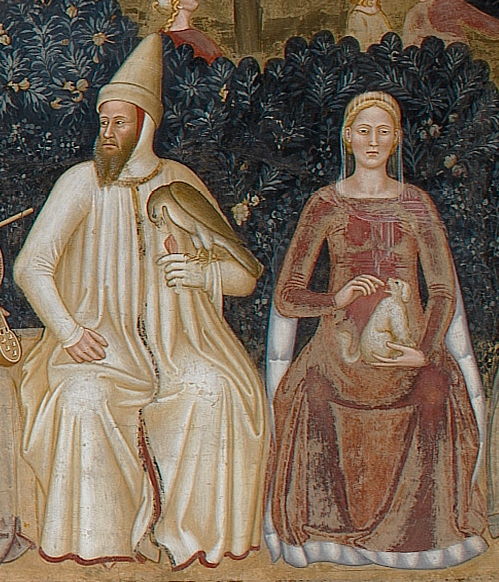
Agnese's parents

Agnese was born in Milan, Italy and was the ninth of seventeen children. Her father, Bernabò Visconti, was a cruel and ruthless despot and an implacable enemy of the Church. He seized the papal city of Bologna, rejected the Pope and his authority, confiscated ecclesiastical property, and forbade any of his subjects to have any dealings with the Curia. He was excommunicated as a heretic in 1363 by Pope Urban V, who preached crusade against him. When Bernabò was in one of his frequent rages, only the children's mother, Beatrice Regina, was able to approach him. Agnese's maternal grandparents were Mastino II della Scala and his wife Taddea da Carrara. Her paternal grandparents were Stefano Visconti and his wife Valentina Doria.

Agnese's sister, Taddea Visconti, married Stephen III, Duke of Bavaria and was the mother of Isabeau of Bavaria, wife of Charles VI of France. Agnese and the rest of her sisters secured politically advantageous marriages.

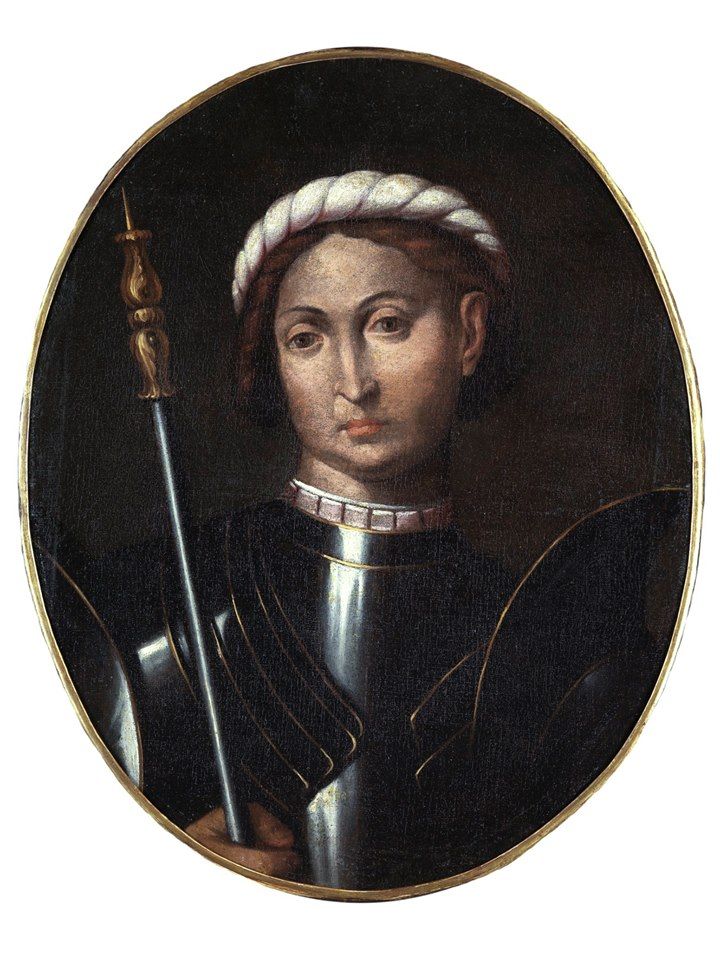
Francesco I Gonzaga, husband of Agnese Visconti

== Marriage ==
In 1375 Agnese was promised to Francesco Gonzaga, son and heir of Ludovico II Gonzaga, Lord of Mantua. The marriage by proxy was signed on 15 August of the same year, with Agnese brought as a dowry 50,000 gold scudi and the cities of Parma, Cremona, Brescia and Bergamo. The formal wedding ceremony took place five years later, on Christmas Day 1380; on the occasion of her wedding, Agnese received from her parents the Libro delle Istorie del Mondo from Giovanni di Benedetto da Como.

The couple had only one daughter:

- Alda Gonzaga (1381 — 30 July 1405), who married in 1397 Francesco III Novello da Carrara, Lord of Padua.

In 1385, Bernabò Visconti was captured with his sons, Ludovico and Rodolfo, by his nephew Gian Galeazzo Visconti and imprisoned in the castle of Trezzo, where he died a few months later. Agnese declared herself hostile towards her cousin Gian Galeazzo. She hosted many Milanese exiles who opposed the new lord of Milan in her court of Mantua.

Accused by her husband of having committed adultery with Antonio da Scandiano, Agnese was beheaded in Mantua on 7 February 1391 while her alleged lover was hanged. Agnese may not have been guilty. However, her husband wanted to ally with Gian Galeazzo Visconti, and Agnese's death was necessary to overcome her hostility towards him. Nevertheless, Francesco remarried only two years later (1393) with Margherita Malatesta, making a new alliance with the Lords of Rimini against the Visconti of Milan.

Both Agnese and her alleged lover were buried in the current Piazza Pallone, the courtyard of the Ducal Palace of Mantua, where a plaque is still placed, which commemorates their deaths.

== Sources ==
- Bueno de Mesquita, Daniel Meredith (1941). Giangaleazzo Visconti, Duke of Milan (1351-1402): a study in the political career of an Italian despot. Cambridge: Cambridge University Press. ISBN 9780521234559. OCLC 837985673.
- Tuchman, Barbara W. (2014). A Distant Mirror: The Calamitous 14th Century. New York: Random House Trade Paperbacks Edition. ISBN 9780345349576. OCLC 70406290.
