= Santa Maria della Scala, Milan =

Demolished church in Milan (Italy)

Santa Maria della Scala
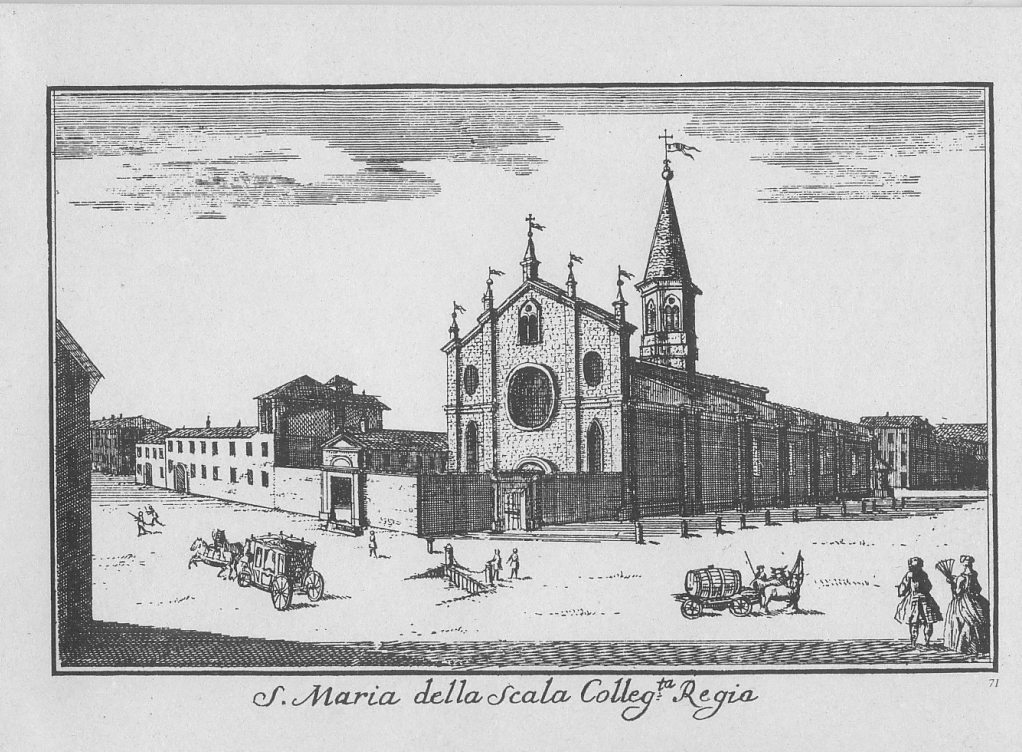
- Santa Maria della Scala (engraving by Marc'Antonio Dal Re)

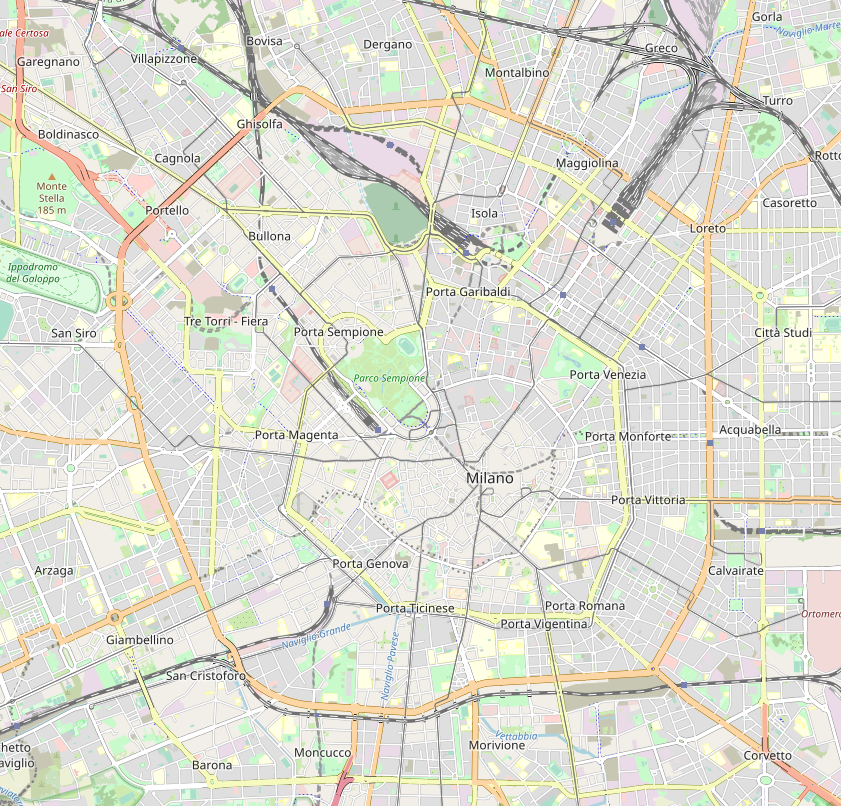
- Location in Milan
- 45°28′04″N 9°11′19″E
- Location: Piazza della Scala; 20121 Milan
- Country: Italy
- Denomination: Roman Catholic
- Tradition: Ambrosian Rite (Roman Catholic)

History
- Founded: 7 September 1381
- Founder: Regina della Scala
- Dedication: Assumption of Mary

Architecture
- Functional status: Demolished
- Style: Lombard Gothic
- Years built: 1381–1385
- Demolished: 1776

Santa Maria della Scala was a church dedicated to the Assumption of the Virgin Mary and located in the center of Milan. It was erected in Gothic style in the 14th century and is the namesake of Beatrice Regina della Scala, wife of the Lord of Milan Bernabò Visconti, and demolished in the 18th century to make way for a new theatre called Teatro alla Scala (La Scala) after her name.

== History ==
=== Foundation (14th century) ===
The church was built on the site called della Case Rotte, where the ruins of the palace of the Della Torre family lay, demolished by Matteo Visconti after he had defeated them at the beginning of the 14th century.

The church's construction began on September 7, 1381, with the groundbreaking ceremony attended by Regina Della Scala, the Milan archbishop Saluzzo, and the Visconti court. Beatrice della Scala died in 1384 after having recommended to her husband that she promptly complete her work. The church was consecrated in 1385. Initially known as Santa Maria alle Case Rotte, it later assumed the name of Santa Maria della Scala after the name of its founder.

The building was erected in the Lombard Gothic style. The interior was divided into three naves, with vaults supported by four pairs of pillars. The façade was gabled and vertically divided into three sections, corresponding to the three internal naves. The portal opened in the central section, and a large rose window above gave light to the central nave. Still above, there was a mullioned window with trefoil arches and a central oculus. In correspondence with the lateral naves, two other small rose windows were on both sides of the central rose window.

The naves of the church were oriented along the current Via Manzoni. Seven buttresses, four of which corresponded to the four pillars of the inner bays, divided the outer lateral walls.

The church had a bell tower polygonal with reinforced edges. Mullioned windows with trefoil arches and a central oculus opened the belfry.

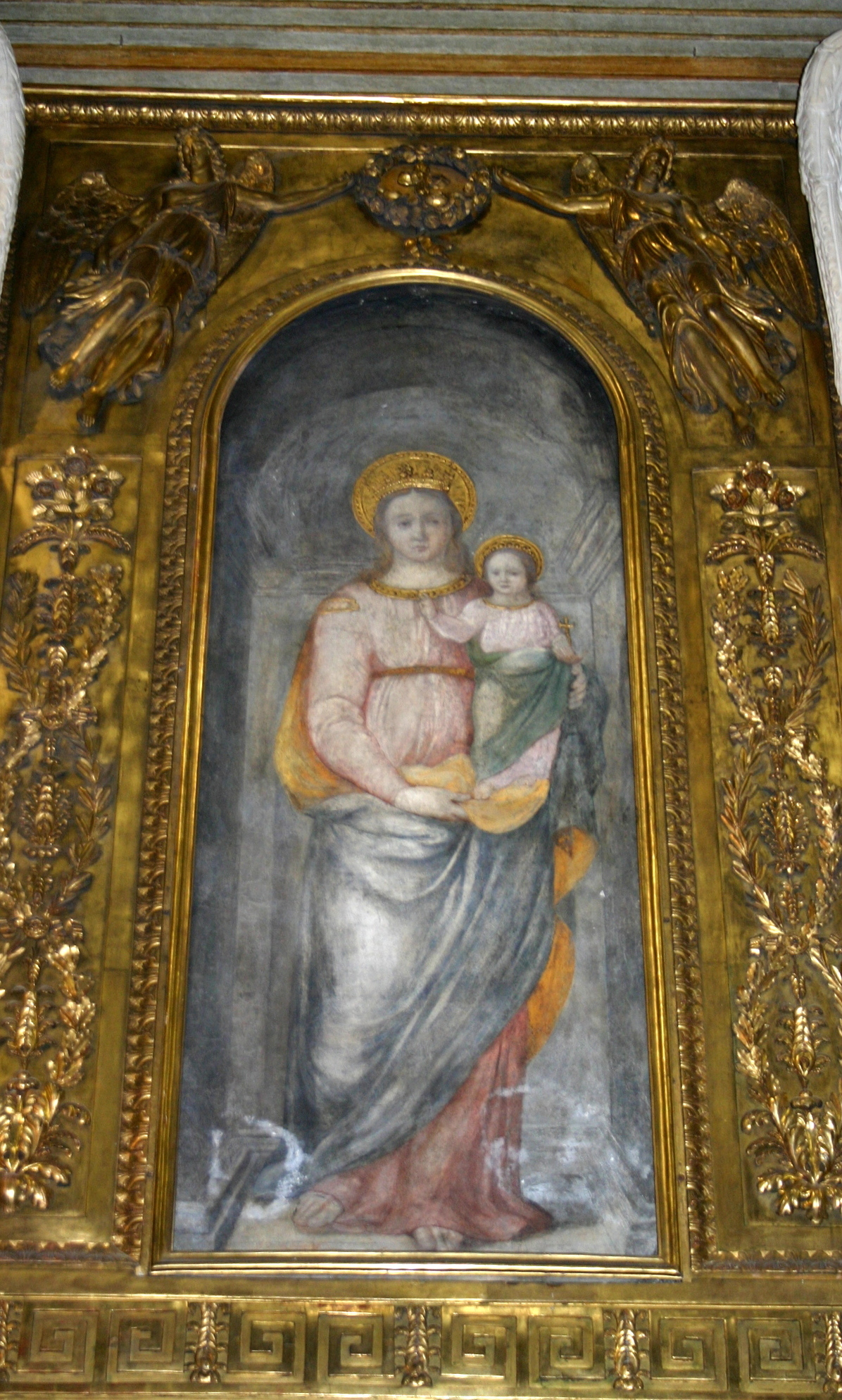
Fresco of Virgin and Child, now in the church of San Fedele

=== Transformation in the 16th century ===
In the 16th century, the apse was rebuilt with polygonal architecture and reinforced corners, occupying the land behind the church.

The apse space's increase allowed for the addition of an inlaid wooden choir, completed in 1560. Preserved until today, since it was transferred to the nearby church of San Fedele before the church's demolition, the choir had a horseshoe shape reproducing the apse's form.

=== Dismantling (18th century) ===
In 1776, Empress Maria Theresa confirmed the decision to demolish the Church of Santa Maria della Scala to build a new theater in that area. The decision seems to have also been determined by the precarious static conditions of the church, seriously compromised by a streamlet that flowed nearby.

A series of activities for the passage of the canons to the nearby church of San Fedele and the preservation of frescoes, paintings, and sculptures kept in the church preceded the demolition of Santa Maria alla Scala.

A fresco of the Virgin and Child was detached from the wall and transferred with other paintings on wood and sculptures to the church of San Fedele. The wooden choir was transferred to the church of San Fedele and adapted to its apse. Some other sculpture elements were transferred to the Sforza Castle Museum.

== Today ==
No sign survives where the church once stood; only the theater's name retains its memory. The church's façade would have fronted Largo Antonio Ghiringhelli, where the entrance to the Scala Theater Museum stands.

Several works of art transferred before the church's demolition can be visited at the church of San Fedele. Among these, the most important are a fresco of the Virgin with Child and two paintings: a Transfiguration by Bernardino Campi and a Deposition by Simone Peterzano, a pupil of Caravaggio. A statue of a reclining bishop, part of a funeral monument made by Bambaia, can be visited at the nearby San Fedele Museum.

Paintings and sculptures transferred to the nearby church of San Fedele
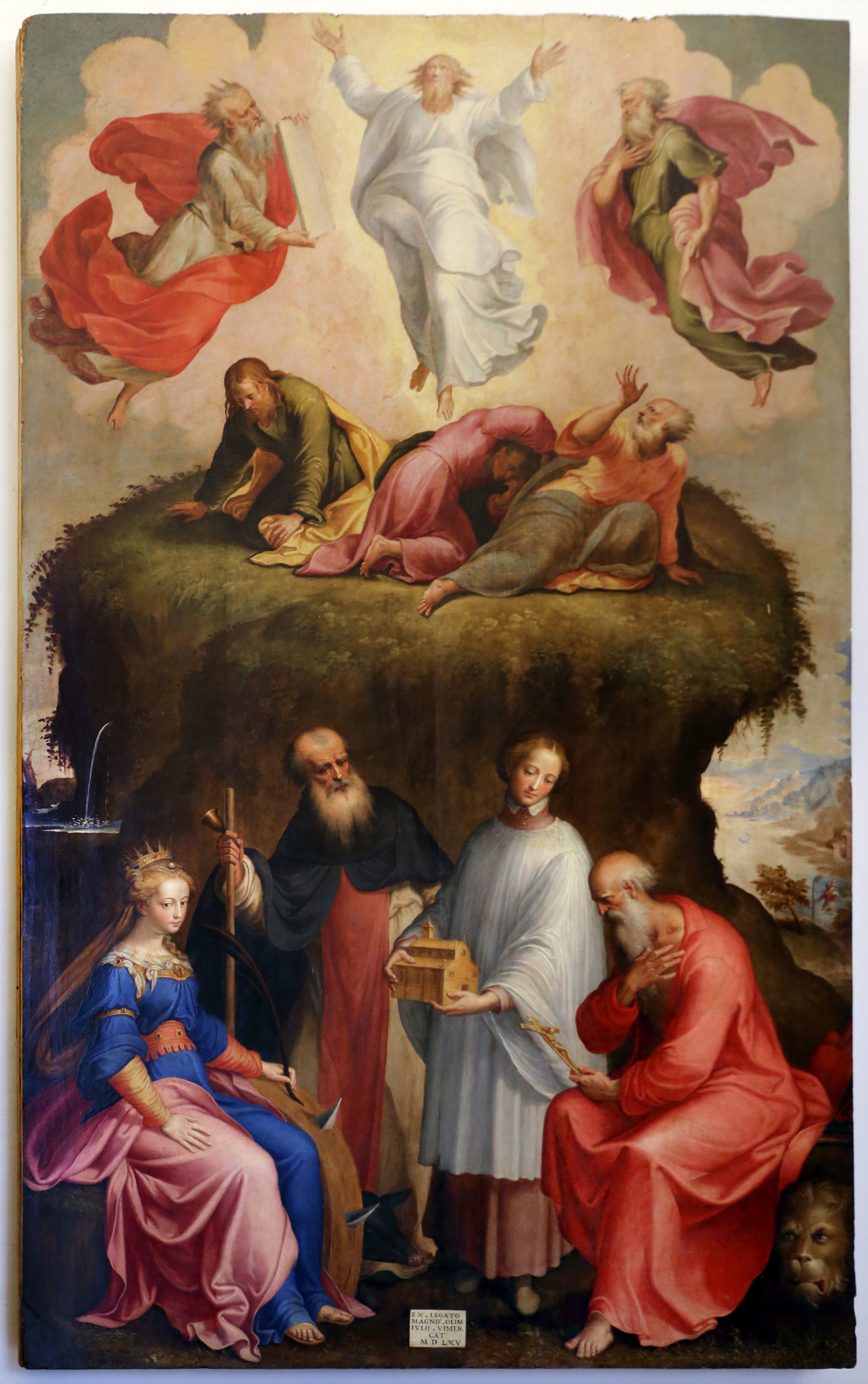
Transfiguration and Saints by Bernardino Campi

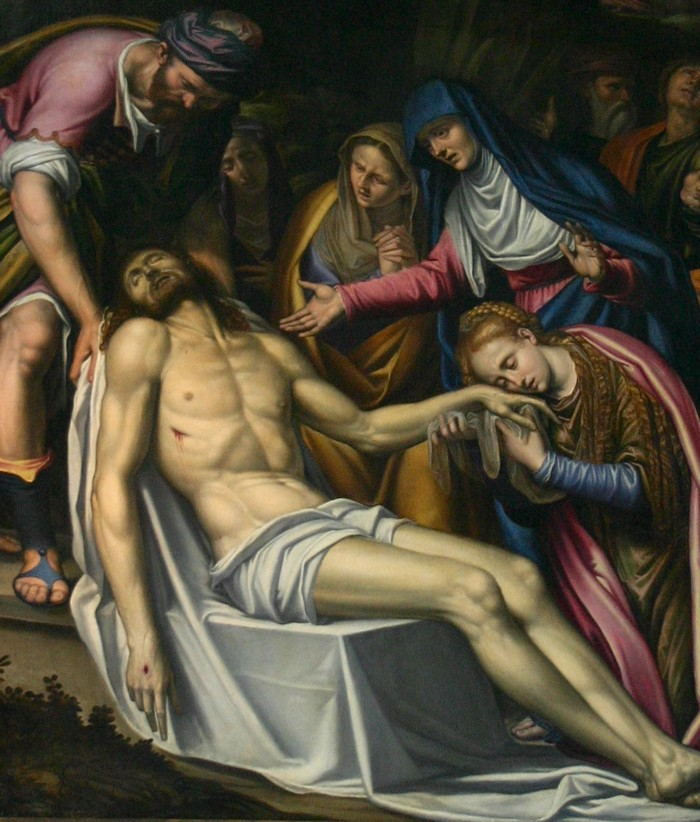
Deposition from the Cross by Simone Peterzano

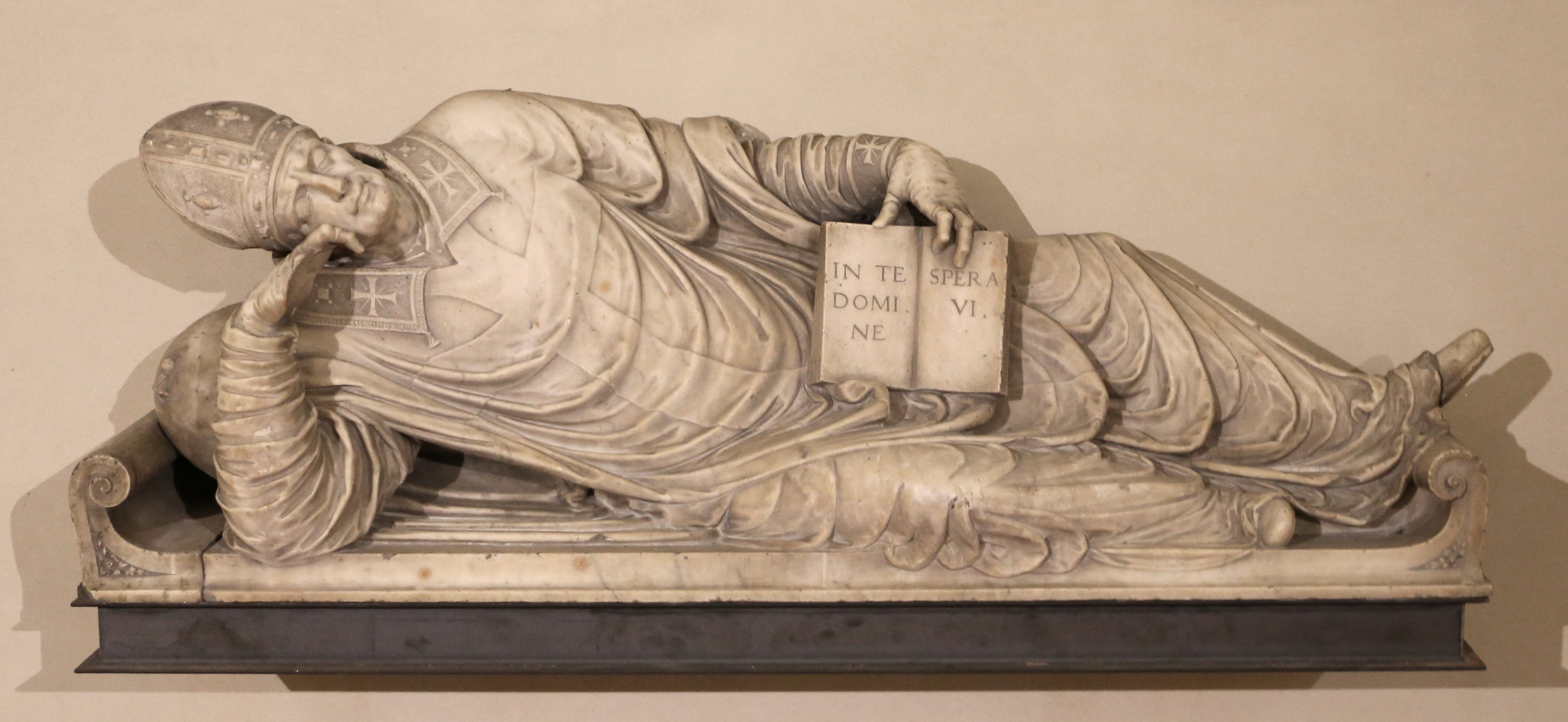
Funeral monument statue by Agostino Busti, known as Bambaia

== Sources ==
- Caciagli, Mario; Ceresoli, Jacqueline; Di Marzo, Pantaleo (1998). Milano, le chiese scomparse (in Italian). Vol. I. Milano: Civica Biblioteca d’Arte. OCLC 249727470.
- Latuada, Serviliano (1998). "Santa Maria della Scala, Collegiata e Cappella Reale". Descrizione di Milano: ornata con molti disegni in rame delle fabbriche più cospicue che si trovano in questa metropolis. Tomo quinto (in Italian) (reprint of 1738 ed.). Milano: La vita felice. ISBN 9788886314800. OCLC 955138526.
- Romussi, Carlo (1913). Milano ne' suoi monumenti. Terza edizione rinnovata e completata (in Italian). Vol. II, dall’anno 1000 al 1400. Milano: Società Editrice Sonzogno. OCLC 812662819.
