= Lucia Visconti =

14th-century Italian noblewoman

- Countess of Kent
- Tenure: 1407-1424
- Born: c. 1380; Milan
- Died: 14 April 1424
- Buried: Austin Friars, London
- Noble family: Visconti of Milan
- Spouse: Edmund Holland, 4th Earl of Kent
- Father: Bernabò Visconti
- Mother: Beatrice Regina della Scala

Lucia Visconti (c. 1380 – 14 April 1424) was a Milanese aristocrat who was the Countess of Kent by marriage from 1407 to 1424. She was one of fifteen legitimate children of Bernabò Visconti, who, along with his brother Galeazzo, was Lord of Milan. Her father negotiated for his infant daughter to marry Louis II of Anjou but Bernabò was deposed and the negotiations dropped. As a teenager, it was then intended that she marry the English noble Henry Bolingbroke, whom she had met as a girl, but after he was banished to France, the marriage negotiations were suspended. She was briefly wedded in 1399 to Frederick IV of Thuringia, the son of Landgrave Balthasar, before the marriage was annulled.

In 1407 she married Edmund Holland, 4th Earl of Kent; there were no children. The relationship was troubled, as Edmund had had an affair shortly before the wedding, and a daughter from that relationship was born after they were married. In September 1408, Edmund was killed in battle. Henry IV guaranteed Visconti a third of the income from her portion of her husband's lands in England, but for the rest of her life she was constantly affected by money problems, as the dowry promised by her family upon her marriage was never paid: reprisals taken against Milanese merchants in London in 1464 and 1489 were probably both related to the unpaid dowry.

Lucia died in 1424 and was buried in Austin Friars, London.

== Early life ==
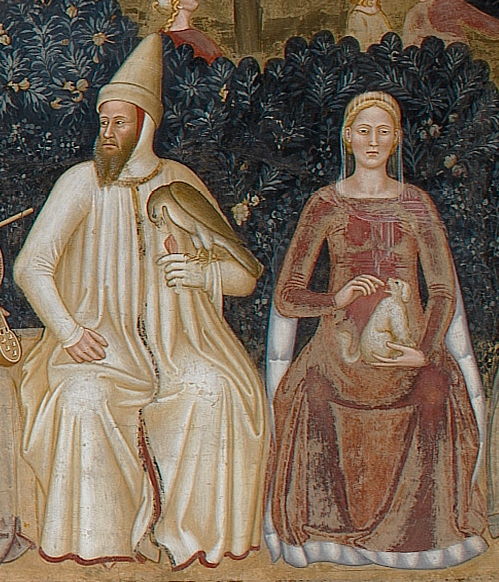
Bernabò Visconti and his wife Regina della Scala

Lucia Visconti was born in Milan in 1380 to Bernabò Visconti, Lord of Milan (ruling jointly with his brother Galeazzo II), and Beatrice Regina della Scala, one of fifteen legitimate children. As was typical of girls born to noble families, she and her nine sisters were expected to marry members of other noble families to form or strengthen alliances. Her sisters Valentina and Anglesia, became Queens of Cyprus, and another sister Caterina married their cousin Gian Galeazzo (son of Galeazzo II), who became the first Duke of Milan.

== Marriage arrangements ==
Between 1382 and 1384, Bernabò actively sought marriage negotiations for his infant daughter with Louis II, the Duke of Anjou and the future King of Naples. A marriage would have cemented Visconti's future as Queen of Sicily. Bernabò remained in close contact with Marie of Blois, widow of Louis I, attempting to come to terms on a marriage contract. At the time, there was discord in the Visconti family. Gian Galeazzo, who succeeded his father in 1378, saw the impending marriage as a threat – an alliance which would enhance his uncle's position in the family at the expense of his own. In the spring of 1385, Bernabò was deposed and taken prisoner by his nephew. The marriage contract between Louis II and Lucia Visconti was cancelled and upon Bernabò's death in December 1385, Gian Galeazzo became the sole ruler of Milan, giving him the authority to determine whom Lucia Visconti was to wed.

The most notable potential suitor lined up for Visconti was Henry, the Duke of Lancaster (the future King Henry IV of England), who visited Milan in 1393 and had captured her imagination. In 1399, when arrangements between the two of them were being discussed, Henry – whose first wife died in 1394 – was banished to France for ten years by King Richard II and had his lands taken. For Gian Galeazzo, political security came first and foremost and as such, he put the negotiations on hold, insisting that Henry return to favour at court before any further talks could proceed. Visconti was smitten with Henry and told her sister Caterina that if she could be sure of marrying him, she would wait for Henry "to the very end of her life, even if she knew that she would die three days after the marriage".

Later that year, Henry returned to England and overthrew Richard with the help of the King of France, but the marriage negotiations never resumed.

Instead, Gian Galeazzo offered Visconti to Frederick, son of the landgrave Balthasar of Thuringia, and they were married in 1399, but the marriage was never consummated and she was able to obtain an annulment on the grounds that she was forced into it. A musical piece entitled Più chiar che'l sol by Antonello da Caserta is believed to have been written for the wedding.

=== Edmund Holland ===
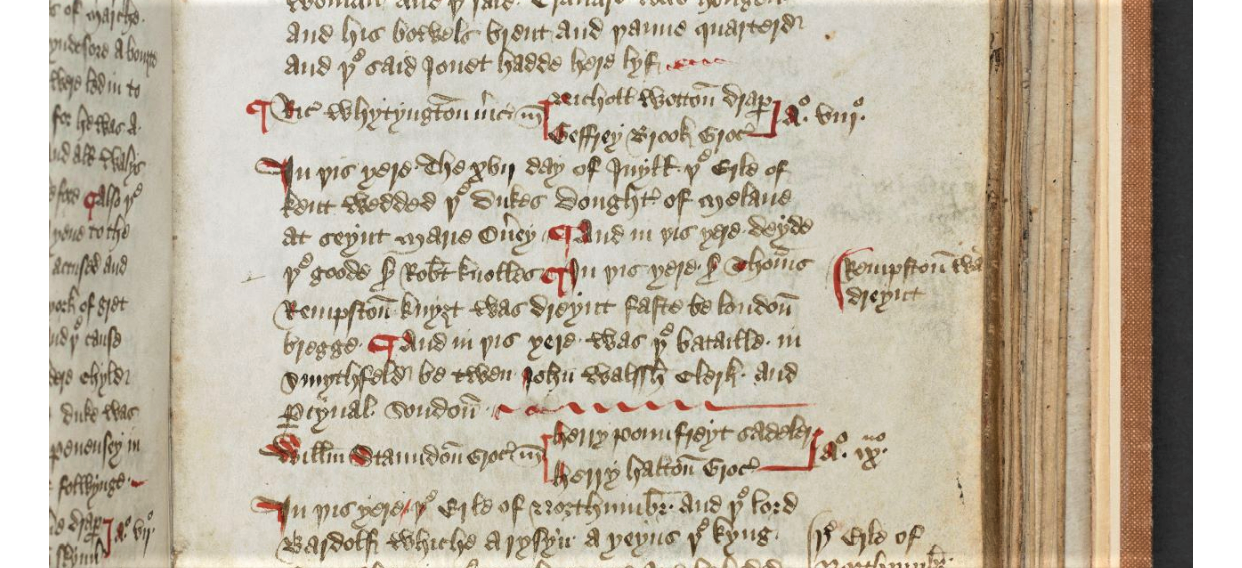
The announcement of the marriage between Lucia Visconti and Edmund Holland, in A Chronicle of London (original manuscript in the British Museum)

Gian Galeazzo's death in 1402 eliminated the possibility of any future political marriage for Visconti. Meanwhile, Henry remarried in 1403, but had not forgotten her. He arranged for her to marry Edmund Holland, 4th Earl of Kent, a favourite soldier of his who had fought at the Battle of Shrewsbury. In 1405, Edmund had defended Henry's son in battle which helped solidify his exemplary prominence. In May 1406, a marriage contract was drawn up for the two of them, which called for a dowry of 70,000 florins of which 12,000 were to be paid on consummation of the marriage, followed by annual payments of 8,285 florins until the total amount was paid, which was likely an attraction for Holland as he had great debts resulting from the military support expected of him by Henry and having to support several dowager countesses.

The wedding took place on 24 January 1407 at St. Mary Overy in Southwark, making Visconti the Countess of Kent. A record of their marriage was published in 1827 by the English antiquary Sir Nicholas Harris Nicolas, in his A Chronicle of London, 1089–1483. At the wedding ceremony, it was Henry who gave Visconti away. However, the marriage between the newlywed couple was off to a rocky start. To preface, in 1406, Edmund had had a liaison with Constance of York and the following year, Constance gave birth to Edmund's illegitimate daughter, Eleanor. There is no surviving documentation that indicates Visconti's reaction to either of them, but Edmund's sisters noted that Constance was not an obstacle in their brother's marriage.

In May 1408, Lucia was granted a letter of denization. In September 1408, Visconti was widowed when Edmund was killed in battle in Brittany. The couple did not have any children.

== Widowhood ==
Unlike other widows of her time, Visconti was not made to return to her family's home, but was rather able to make a life out of what she had. More specifically, she used her title as the Countess of Kent to her benefit. Since her husband left her with little money (the dowry had not yet been paid), she was to deal with his major debt. She decided to follow in the footsteps of her half-sister Donnina (who had married John Hawkwood, an English soldier) by approaching Henry for financial aid. Henry granted her one-third of the income of her portion of her late husband's land (which was one-fifth of the estate; the remainder was divided among his four sisters), with the remainder used to pay his creditors. This was not enough to balance the accounts, and Visconti petitioned Parliament for letters of marque that would compel Milan to pay the dowry. However, Milan had its own financial problems after Gian Galeazzo's death and payment never came. (Note: In a similar situation in 1423, Milan rescinded the dowry owed for the marriage of Valentina Visconti to Peter II of Cyprus, which had ended in 1393 upon Valentina's death and was likewise childless.) She petitioned Parliament a second time for debt relief, promising a portion of the dowry to Edmund's creditors.

However, the cost of maintaining her estates was too great, and by July 1421, Visconti was residing at the medieval Holy Trinity Minories (she may have been there as early as September 1411), which was similar to a nunnery but was also known as a place where women of high status and money would live together. It is believed that she lived in a townhouse built in 1352 by Elizabeth de Burgh, which had a reputation for housing women who were in tenuous political circumstances. Here, she lived a comfortable and well-kept life, but she was also engaged in business, being listed as an exporter of goods to Italy in 1423.

Visconti's will bequeathed a portion of her unpaid dowry to various English nobles and other Italian immigrants, with the remainder (along with personal items) going to her steward, some ladies-in-waiting, her fool, and various religious institutions in Milan and England, including St. Mary Overy, Bourne Abbey in Lincolnshire (where Edmund was buried), and the Minoresses from Holy Trinity, but all of the recipients were equally unable to obtain the money from Milan. The bequests to religious recipients came with conditions to pray for herself and Edmund's souls.

She died on 14 April 1424 (Note: Her death date is sometimes recorded as 4 April, but that cannot be possible as she signed her will on 11 April 1424.) and was buried in Austin Friars, London, which was a popular resting place for London's Italian immigrants. Her epitaph, written in Latin, focuses on her charm and beauty, her family and Milanese heritage, and does not mention her husband at all. It is preserved in a 16th-century document held in the British Museum, although the last part of it is untranslatable.

== Legacy ==
As her dowry was never paid, the claims against it continued long after her death. Reprisals taken against Milanese merchants in London in 1464 to recover this sum were probably related to the dowry, and these grew to be so debilitating that the merchants were forced to stop trading with England in 1471, prompting Galeazzo Maria Sforza, the Duke of Milan, to ask his envoy in England to plead for relief. In 1486, a letter to the new Duke of Milan, Gian Galeazzo Sforza, demanded payment of the dowry. The Duke claimed to be unaware of such a debt at first, and three years later, ultimately declined the request as no documentation had been provided. Further reprisals took place in England in 1489, but the Duke was able to convince Henry to put a stop to them. However, Emperor Frederick III issued separate letters of marque in 1490, which enabled English agents to detain Milanese traders on the Rhine. Even though Visconti's will was finally produced, the Duke declared it to be a fraud. Eventually, King Henry VII ordered that efforts to enforce the dowry be dropped.
