= Elisabetta Visconti =

- Duchess consort of Bavaria-Munich
- Born: 1374; Milan, Italy
- Died: 2 February 1432 (aged 57–58); Bavaria
- Noble family: Visconti
- Spouse: Ernest, Duke of Bavaria
- Issue: Albert III, Duke of Bavaria; Beatrix, Countess of Cilli; Elisabeth, Duchess of Berg; Amalie
- Father: Bernabò Visconti
- Mother: Beatrice Regina della Scala

Elisabetta Visconti (1374 – 2 February 1432), also known as Elisabeth or Elizabeth, was a younger child of Bernabò Visconti and Beatrice Regina della Scala. She was a member of the House of Visconti.

== Family ==
Elisabetta was born in Milan and was one of the youngest of fifteen siblings.

Elisabetta's sister, Taddea Visconti married Stephen III, Duke of Bavaria and was mother of Isabeau of Bavaria, wife of Charles VI of France. Isabeau was the mother of Charles VII of France, Catherine, Queen of England, Isabella, Queen of England and Michelle, Duchess of Valois.

Elisabetta's maternal grandparents were Mastino II della Scala and his wife Taddea da Carrara. Her paternal grandparents were Stefano Visconti and his wife Valentina Doria.

Elisabetta's father, Bernabò, was a cruel and ruthless despot, and an implacable enemy of the Church. He seized the papal city of Bologna, rejected the Pope and his authority, confiscated ecclesiastical property, and forbade any of his subjects to have any dealings with the Curia. He was excommunicated as a heretic in 1363 by Pope Urban V, who preached crusade against him. When Bernabò was in one of his frequent rages, only Beatrice Regina was able to approach him.

== Marriage ==
In 1380, Elisabetta was at first promised to Azzone, a son of Gian Galeazzo Visconti and his first wife Isabella of Valois. The marriage could not take place due to Azzone's premature death. After Isabella of Valois died, Caterina Visconti, Elisabetta's older sister, married his father Gian Galeazzo.

John II, Duke of Bavaria started marriage negotiations between his son, Ernest and Elisabetta.

The negotiations were successful. Elisabetta was married in Pfaffenhofen an der Ilm 26 January 1395 to Ernest. Two years later, on John's death, the couple became Duke and Duchess of Bavaria-Munich. The couple had four children:

- Albert III, Duke of Bavaria (23 March 1401, Munich–29 February 1460, Munich)
- Beatrix (c. 1403–12 March 1447, Neumarkt), married to:
  - 1424 in Ortenburg Count Hermann III of Cilli;
  - 1428 in Riedenburg Pfalzgraf Johann of Neuburg.
- Elisabeth (c. 1406–5 March 1468, Heidelberg), married to:
  - 1430 in Mainz Duke Adolf of Jülich-Berg;
  - 1440 in Worms Count Hesso of Leiningen.
- Amalie (1408–1432), a nun in St. Klara's Cloister in Munich.

Before Elisabetta's death in 1432, her son Albert III married secretly the maid Agnes Bernauer; Ernest issued orders for her to be murdered. Agnes was accused of witchcraft and thrown into the River Danube and drowned. The civil war with his son finally ended with a reconciliation.

Elisabetta died 2 February 1432. She is buried with her husband in Munich.

== Ancestry ==
Ancestors of Elisabetta Visconti

16. Teobaldo Visconti
8. Matteo I Visconti
17. Anastasia Pirovano
4. Stefano Visconti
18. Squarcina Borri
9. Bonacossa Borri
19. Antonia
2. Bernabò Visconti
20. Brancaleone Doria
10. Bernabò Doria
21. Caterina Zancha
5. Valentina Doria
22. Federico Fieschi
11. Eliana Fieschi
23. Chiara
1. Elisabetta Visconti
24. Alberto I della Scala
12. Alboino I della Scala
25. Verde di Salizzole
6. Mastino II della Scala
26. Gilberto III da Correggio
13. Beatrice da Correggio
27. Elena Malaspina
3. Beatrice Regina della Scala
28. Marsilio III da Carrara
14. Jacopo I da Carrara
29. ... di Carturo
7. Taddea da Carrara
30. Pietro Gradenigo
15. Anna Gradenigo
31. Tommasina Morosini

== Sources ==
- Bueno de Mesquita, Daniel Meredith (1941). Giangaleazzo Visconti, Duke of Milan (1351-1402): a study in the political career of an Italian despot. Cambridge: Cambridge University Press. ISBN 9780521234559. OCLC 837985673.

Preceded by Margaret of Cleves	Duchess of Bavaria-Munich; 1397–1432	Succeeded by Anna of Brunswick
