= San Giovanni in Conca (Crypt), Milan =

Historic site in Milan (Italy

Crypt of San Giovanni in Conca
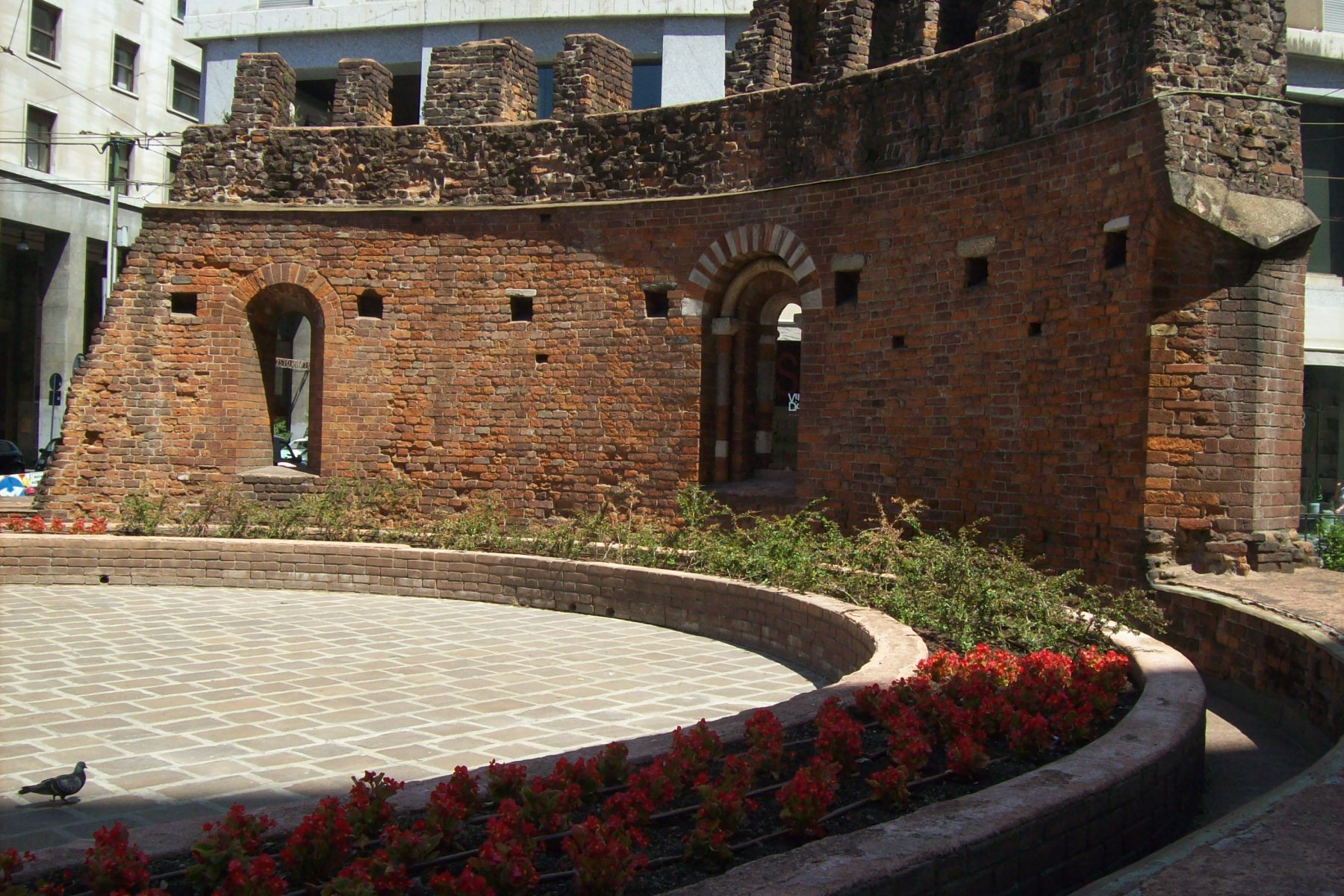
- Current remains of San Giovanni in Conca visible from surface.

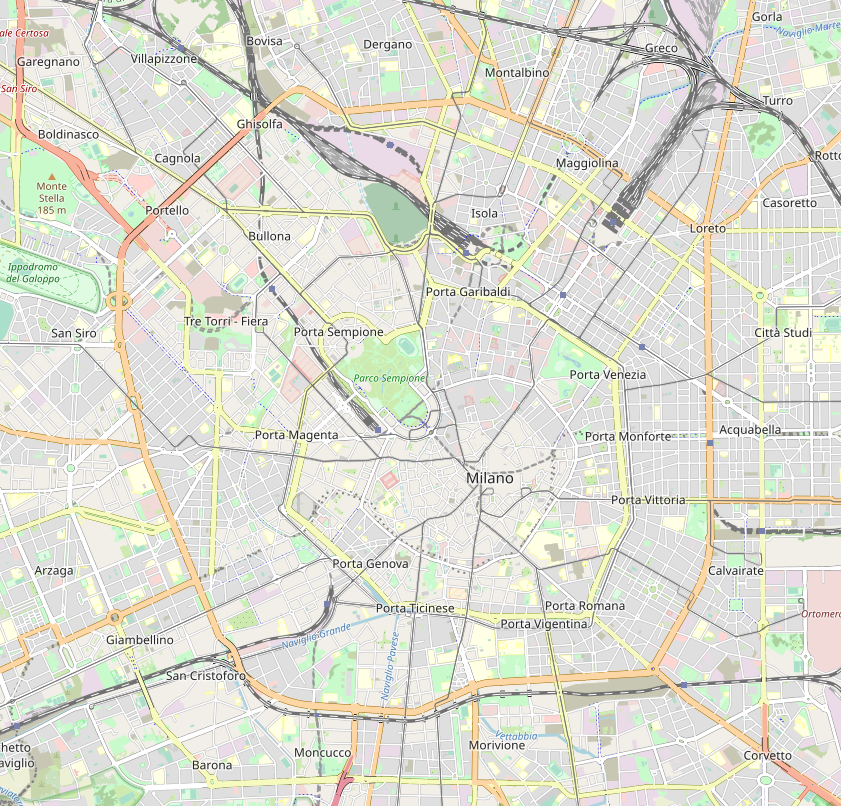
- Location in Milan
- 45°28′12″N 9°10′43″E
- Type: Church remains
- Location: Milan (Piazza Missori),Italy

Site notes
- Architectural style: Romanesque
- Governing body: Touring Club Italiano
- Owner: Milan municipality

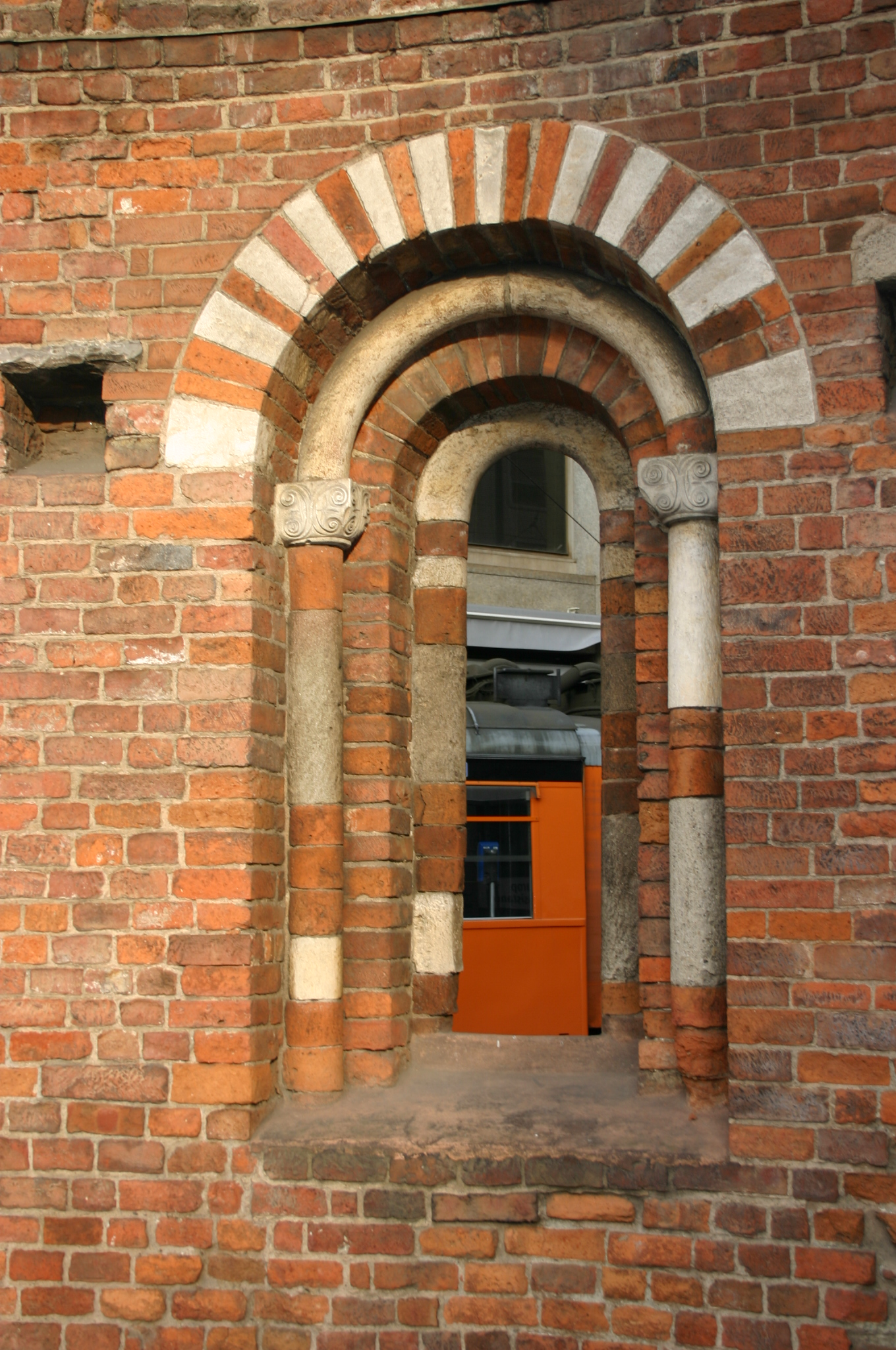
The surviving window of the apse.

San Giovanni in Conca is a crypt of a former basilica church in Milan, northern Italy. It is now located in the centre of Piazza Missori.

== History ==
The basilica of San Giovanni in Conca dates from the 4th century, and was located in a residential quarter of the ancient city. Remains of the mosaic pavement of this original edifice are now in the Archeological Museum of Milan.

The church was rebuilt in the 11th century, but was destroyed by Frederick Barbarossa's troops in 1162. It was again reconstructed in the 13th century and later became the private chapel of the Visconti rulers of Milan. Bernabò Visconti had it connected to his new grandiose palace through a super-elevated walk, and was buried here in a monument by Bonino da Campione which is now in the Sforzesco Castle together with that of his consort, Regina della Scala.

In 1531, Duke Francesco II Sforza donated it to the Carmelites, who erected a campanile which was utilized as astronomical observatory in the 19th century. The church was deconsecrated by the Austrians and closed by the French in the late 18th century.

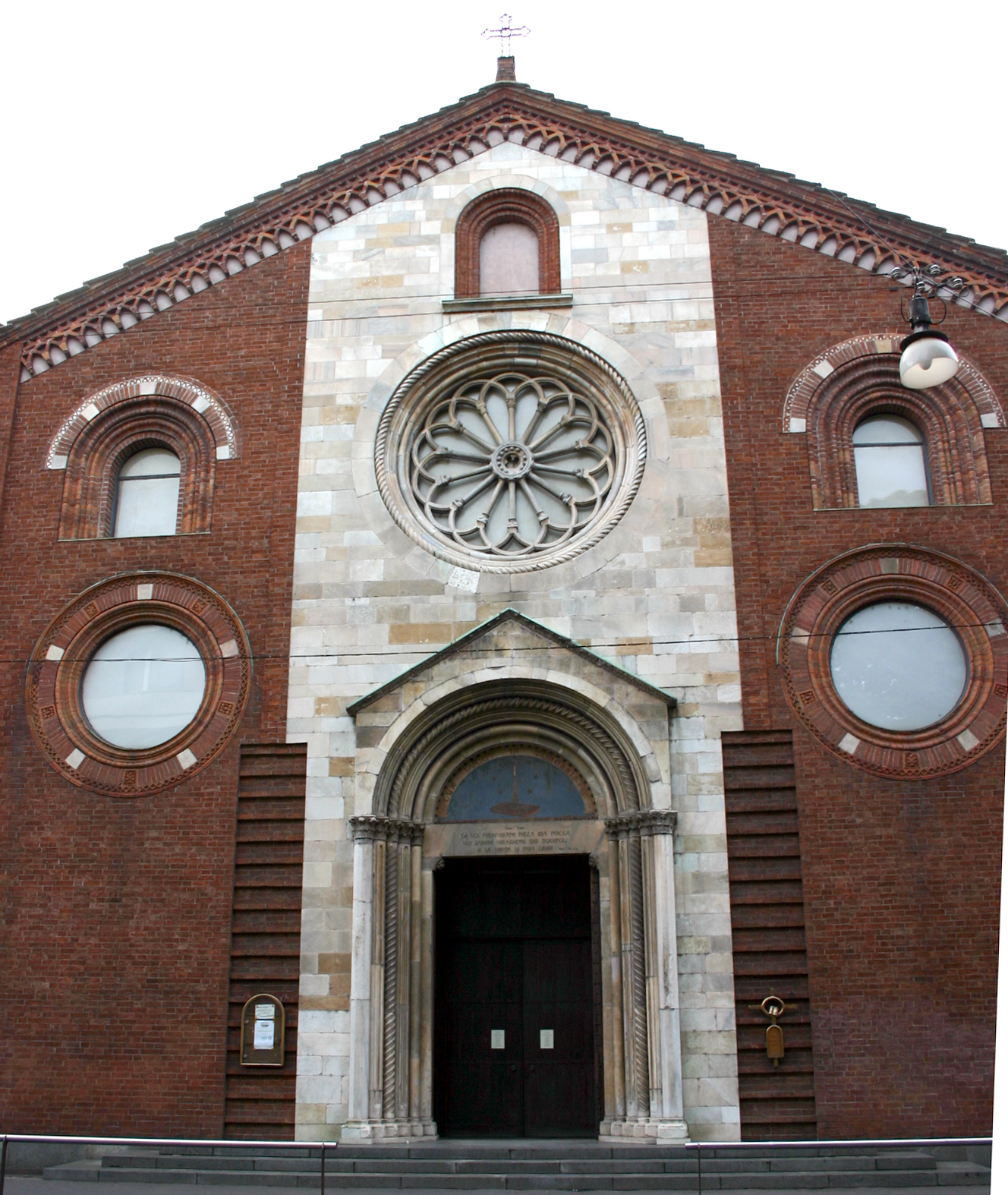
Rebuilt façade of San Giovanni in Conca in the modern Waldensian church of Milan.

In 1879, the church was shortened to allow the construction of the current Via Mazzini; in the occasion, the Gothic façade was attached to the apse. San Giovanni in Conca was then sold to the Waldensians who, when the church was demolished (1949), rebuilt the façade on their new church in Via Francesco Sforza. Works of demolition were however halted just before their end, leaving only the crypt and remains of the apse.

== Remains ==
San Giovanni in Conca ruins include the only extant example of Romanesque crypt in Milan. It houses archaeological findings which illustrates the church's history.

Over the crypt are remains of the apse walls, with a single window and blind arches typical of the Milanese Romanesque.

Artworks from the church which are now in the Sforzesco Castle include, apart the two aforementioned funerary monuments, two figures from an Annunciation (11th century), some Romanesque capitals and frescoes from the 14th century.
