= Taddea Visconti =

Italian noblewoman and Duchess of Bavaria (1351–1381)

- Duchess of Bavaria
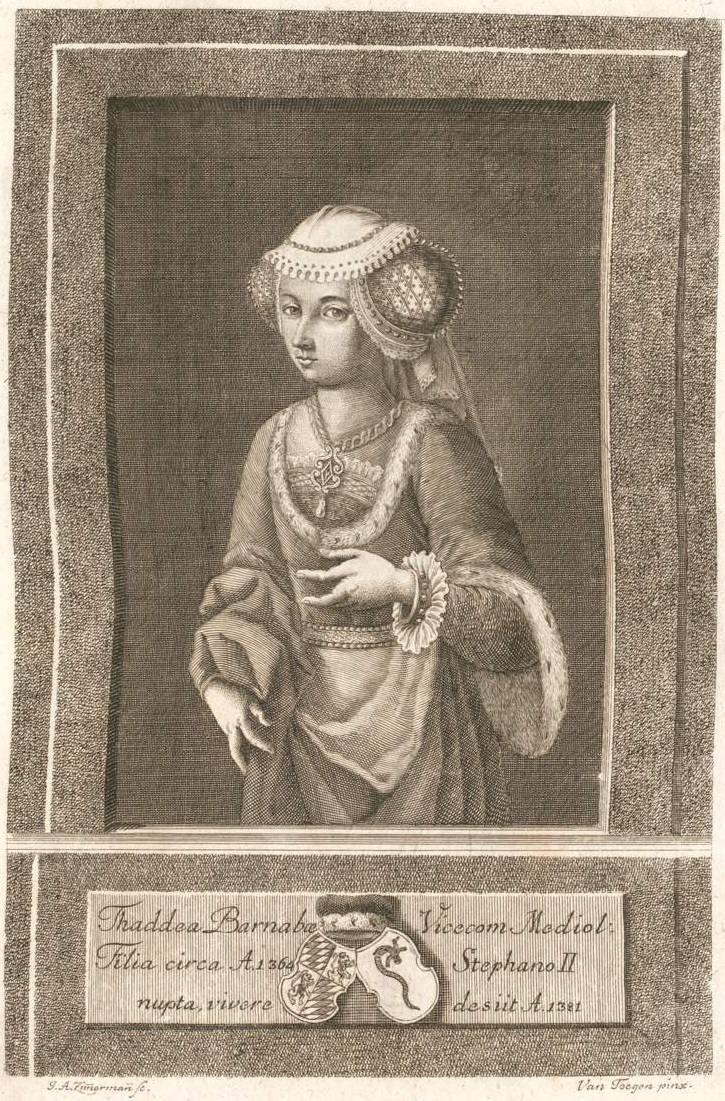
- A posthumous engraving of Taddea by Joseph Zimmermann
- Born: 1351; Milan, Italy
- Died: September 28, 1381 (aged 29–30); Munich, Germany
- Noble family: Visconti
- Spouse: Stephen III, Duke of Bavaria
- Issue: Louis VII, Duke of Bavaria; Isabeau, Queen of France
- Father: Bernabò Visconti, Lord of Milan
- Mother: Beatrice Regina della Scala

Taddea Visconti, Duchess of Bavaria (1351 – 28 September 1381) was an Italian noblewoman of the Visconti family, the ruling house in Milan from 1277 to 1447. She was the first wife of Stephen III, Duke of Bavaria, and the mother of the French queen Isabeau of Bavaria.

== Early life ==
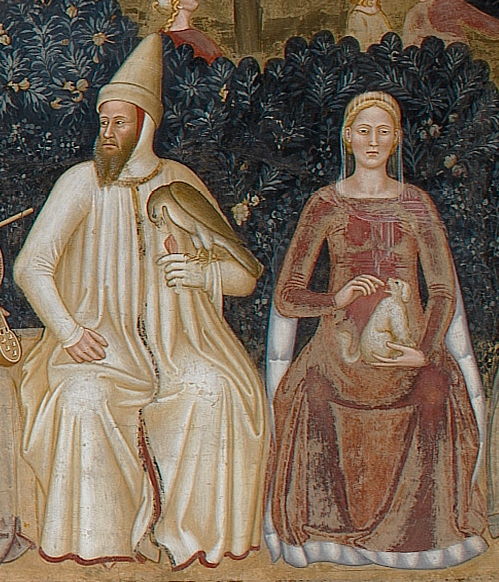
Bernabò Visconti and Beatrice Regina della Scala, the parents of Taddea Visconti

Born in Milan in 1351, sometime after 27 June, Taddea was the eldest child of Bernabò Visconti, Lord of Milan, and Beatrice Regina della Scala (1331–18 June 1384). She had fourteen younger siblings, but she was her parents' favorite child. Her paternal grandparents were Stefano Visconti, Lord of Milan, and Valentina Doria, and her maternal grandparents were Mastino II della Scala and Taddea da Carrara.

Taddea's father Bernabò, continually at war with the papacy (for which he was excommunicated), was a ruthless despot, who would, in 1385, be overthrown by his nephew and son-in-law Gian Galeazzo Visconti and later poisoned in the castle of Trezzo.

== Marriage ==
Bavaria was the wealthiest and most powerful of the German states at the time. Bernabò managed to secure the marriages of four of his children to members of the ruling Wittelsbach family. Taddea, being the eldest, was the first of the four Visconti children selected.

In 1367, Taddea became the first wife of Stephen III of Bavaria-Ingolstadt, who, on 13 May 1375, became Duke of Bavaria. He ruled jointly with his brothers, Frederick (who married Taddea's younger sister Maddalena) and John II, in Bavaria-Landshut. Taddea brought a dowry of 100,000 gold ducats. Her husband Stephen (who was 14 years older than her) is described by writer Barbara Tuchman as "reckless, prodigal, ostentatious, amorous, restless without a tournament or war and well-suited to a Visconti daughter".

Taddea and Stephen had:

- Louis VII, Duke of Bavaria (c. 1368–2 May 1447), married firstly Anne de Bourbon, by whom he had issue, and secondly, Catherine d'Alençon. He had several illegitimate children by various mistresses.
- Isabeau of Bavaria, (early 1370–24 September 1435), Queen consort of King Charles VI of France, whom she married on 17 July 1385.
- unnamed son (born and died in 1377)

Adjustment to life in Bavaria proved a difficult challenge for Taddea, prompting her, in later years, to take extended journeys abroad. The climate of Munich did not prove healthy for her, and she developed a persistent cough and recurring fever. After Stephen III became duke, Taddea was required to attend more state functions, her health notwithstanding. In the 1370s, she began to pay long visits to her homeland, usually bringing her husband and children with her, and stopping at Milan to visit her family. She visited Rome in 1378.

== Death and legacy ==
After a trip to Milan in December 1380, Taddea fell seriously ill. By the time she returned to Bavaria, she was suffering from fever, coughing and weight loss. Her health continued to fail and she died on 28 September 1381 in Munich at the age of 30. She was buried in Unsere Liebe Frau. When news of her death reached Milan, her devastated father ordered his subjects to wear mourning clothes. Less than four years later, her daughter, Isabeau, became Queen of France. Taddea's husband Stephen married secondly, on 16 January 1401, Elisabeth of Cleves, daughter of Count Adolf III of Cleves. This second marriage was childless.

== Ancestry ==
Ancestors of Taddea Visconti

16. Teobaldo Visconti
8. Matteo I Visconti
17. Anastasia Pirovano
4. Stefano Visconti
18. Squarcino Borri
9. Bonacossa Borri
19. Antonia
2. Bernabò Visconti
20. Brancaleone Doria
10. Bernabò Doria
21. Caterina Zancha
5. Valentina Doria
22. Federico Fieschi
11. Eliana Fieschi
23. Chiara
1. Taddea Visconti
24. Alberto I della Scala
12. Alboino I della Scala
25. Verde di Salizzole
6. Mastino II della Scala
26. Gilberto III da Correggio
13. Beatrice da Correggio
27. Elena Malaspina
3. Beatrice Regina della Scala
28. Marsilio III da Carrara
14. Jacopo I da Carrara
29. ... di Carturo
7. Taddea da Carrara
30. Pietro Gradenigo
15. Anna Gradenigo
31. Tommasina Morosini

== Sources ==
- Adams, Tracy (2010). The Life and Afterlife of Isabeau of Bavaria. The Johns Hopkins University Press.
- Kibler, William W.; Zinn, Grover A., eds. (2006). "Isabeau of Bavaria". Medieval France: An Encyclopedia. Routledge.
- Richardson, Douglas (2011). Plantagenet Ancestry: A Study In Colonial And Medieval Families (2nd ed.). Genealogical Publishing Company.
- Rohr, Zita Eva (2016). Yolande of Aragon (1381-1442) Family and Power: The Reverse of the Tapestry. Palgrave Macmillan.
- Tuchman, Barbara (1978). A Distant Mirror. Alfred A Knopf. ISBN 9780394400266.

Preceded by Katharine of Bohemia (United Bavaria)	Duchess of Bavaria-Ingolstadt; With Maddalena Visconti; 1375–1381	Succeeded by Elisabeth of Cleves
