= Bernabò Visconti =

Medieval Italian statesman (1323–1385)

- Lord of Milan
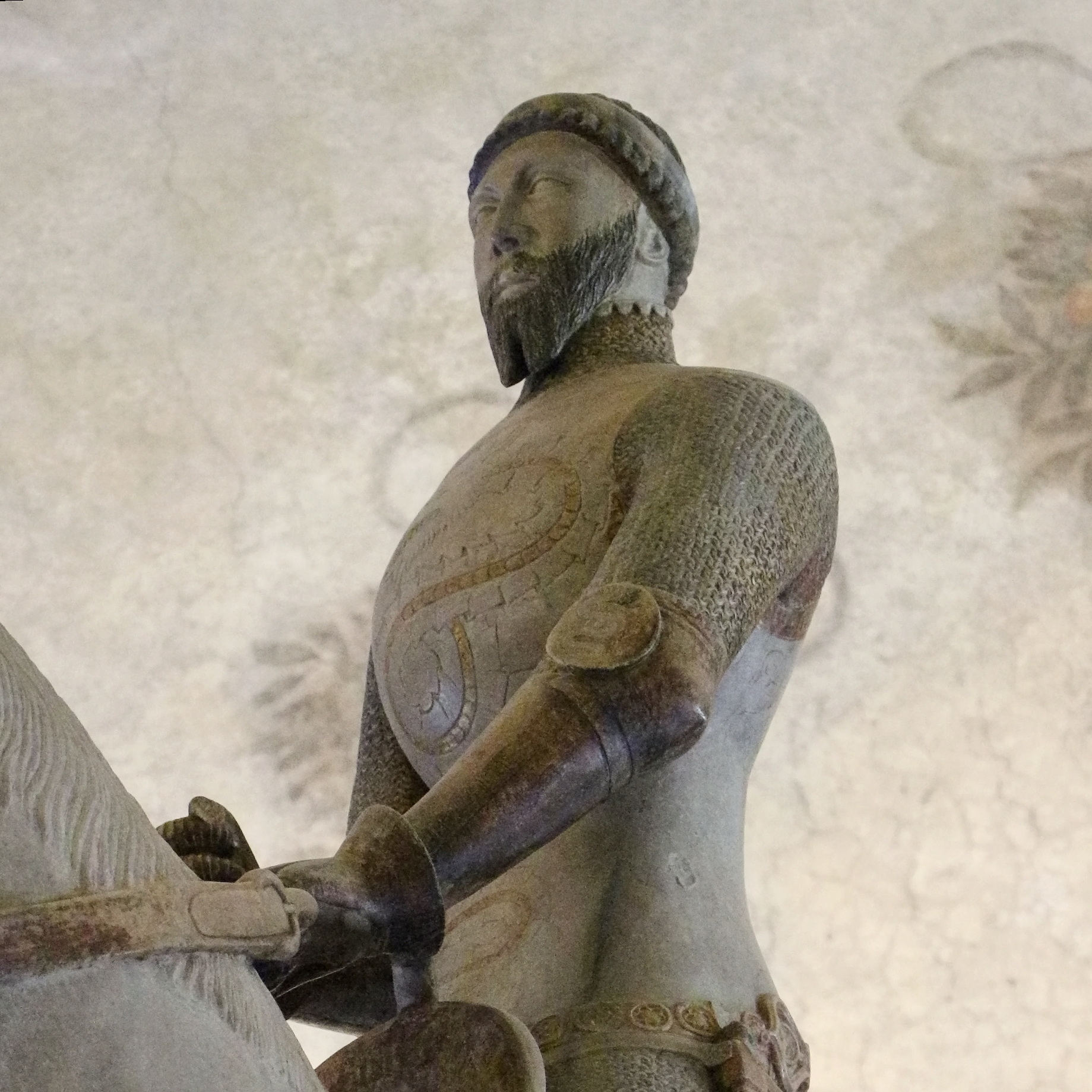
- Bernabò Visconti on horseback (sculpture by Bonino da Campione)

- Coat of arms
- Reign: 1354–1385
- Predecessor: Giovanni Visconti (archbishop of Milan)
- Successor: Gian Galeazzo Visconti
- Born: 1323; Milan, Lordship of Milan
- Died: 19 December 1385 (aged 61–62); Trezzo sull'Adda, Lordship of Milan
- Noble family: Visconti
- Spouse: Beatrice Regina della Scala (m. 1350; died 1384)
- Issue among others...: Taddea, Duchess of Bavaria-Ingolstadt; Viridis, Duchess of Inner Austria; Antonia, Countess of Württemberg; Valentina, Queen of Cyprus; Caterina, Duchess of Milan; Agnese, Lady of Mantua; Maddalena, Duchess of Bavaria-Landshut; Anglesia, Queen of Cyprus; Elisabetta, Duchess of Bavaria-Munich; Lucia, Countess of Kent
- Father: Stefano Visconti
- Mother: Valentina Doria

Bernabò or Barnabò Visconti (1323 – 19 December 1385) was an Italian soldier and statesman who was Lord of Milan. Along with his brothers Matteo and Galeazzo II, he inherited the lordship of Milan from his uncle Giovanni. Later in 1355, he and Galeazzo II were rumoured to have murdered their brother Matteo since he endangered the regime. When Galeazzo II died, he shared Milan's lordship with his nephew Gian Galeazzo. Bernabò was said to be ruthless towards his subjects and did not hesitate to face emperors and popes, including Pope Urban V. The conflict with the Church caused him several excommunications. On 6 May 1385, his nephew Gian Galeazzo deposed him. Imprisoned in his castle, Trezzo sull'Adda, he died a few months later, presumably from poisoning.

== Life ==
Bernabò was born in Milan, the son of Stefano Visconti and Valentina (also known as Violante and Valenza) Doria. Through his mother, he was related to the Dorias and the Fieschis, two of the most powerful families of the Genoese nobility. He was named after his maternal grandfather Bernabo Doria, who had once been ruler of Genoa.

Bernabo had three sisters, Caterina and Grandiana, Taddea and three brothers, Matteo, Galeazzo, and he also had a half-sister, Tiburzia del Carretto, from his mother's first marriage.

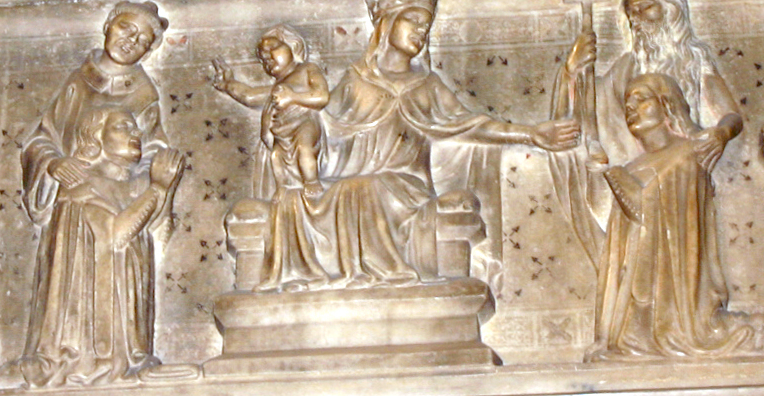
Depictions of Bernabo's parents Stefano Visconti and Valentina Doria from their tomb in the Basilica of Sant'Eustorgio

The year before Bernabo was born, the whole Visconti family were excommunicated with the charge of heresy. This was after his paternal grandfather Matteo I, who was in conflict with the Catholic Church, had charges levelled against him for planning to murder the Pope John XXII and for practising necromancy.

His father Stefano died in the night of July 4, 1327, after a banquet he gave for the coronation of Louis the Bavarian as King of Italy. Stefano's contemporaries linked his death to an attempted poisoning of the king, leading to the imprisonment of Bernabo's uncles, Galeazzo, Giovanni, and Luchino, as well as his cousin, the future Lord of Milan, Azzo Visconti. Bernabo and his siblings, now fatherless, were brought up by their mother Valentina.

While under the reign of their uncle Luchino, Bernabo and his brothers were given some duties. Though their uncle would later suspect his nephews of conspiring against him, from 1346 to 1349 Bernabo lived in exile, until he was called back to Milan by his uncle Giovanni Visconti after the death of Luchino.

On 27 September 1350, Bernabò married Beatrice Regina della Scala, daughter of Mastino II, Lord of Verona and Taddea da Carrara, and forged both a political and cultural alliance between the two cities. His intrigues and ambitions kept him at war almost continuously with Pope Urban V, the Florentines, Venice, and Savoy. In 1354, at the death of Giovanni, he inherited the power of Milan, together with his brothers Matteo and Galeazzo. Bernabò received the eastern lands (Bergamo, Brescia, Cremona and Crema), that bordered the Veronese territories. Milan itself was to be ruled in turn by the three brothers.

Matteo died in 1355, rumoured to have been poisoned by his brothers, who divided his inheritance.

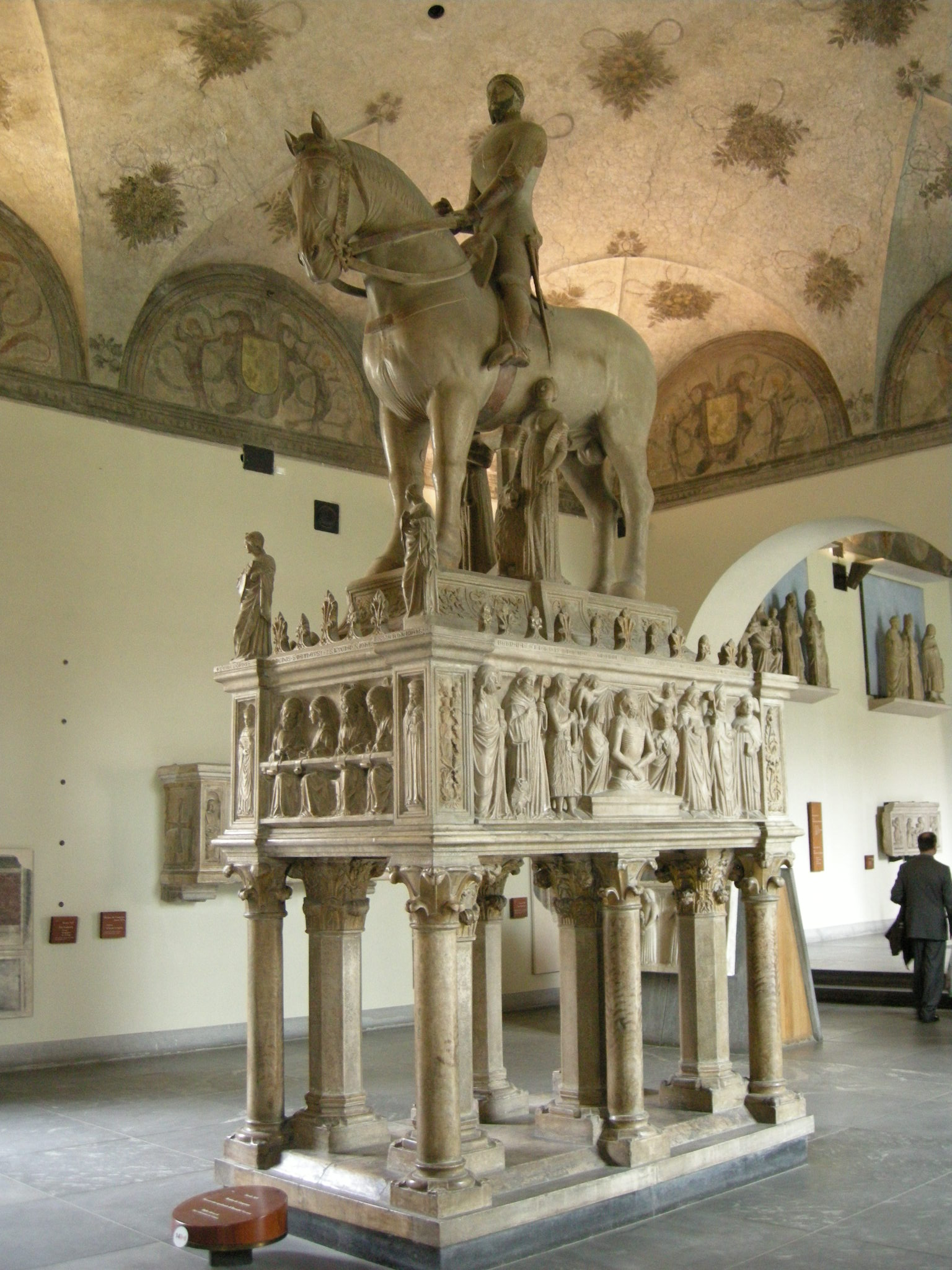
Equestrian statue of Bernabò Visconti (c. 1363) in the Castello Sforzesco, Milan

In 1356, after having offended the emperor, he pushed back a first attack upon Milan by the imperial vicar Markward von Randeck, imprisoning him. In 1360, he was declared heretic by Innocent VI at Avignon and condemned by Emperor Charles IV. The ensuing conflict ended with a dismal defeat at San Ruffillo against the imperial troops under Galeotto I Malatesta (29 July 1361). In 1362, after the death of his sister's husband, Ugolino Gonzaga, he also attacked Mantua. Warring on several different fronts, in December of that year he sued for peace with the new pope, Urban V, through the mediation of King John II of France. However, because Barnabò neglected to return the papal city of Bologna and to present himself at Avignon, on 4 March 1363 he was excommunicated once more, together with his children, one of whom, Ambrogio, was captured by the Papal commander Gil de Albornoz. With the peace signed on 13 March 1364, Visconti left the occupied Papal lands, in exchange for the lifting of the ban upon a payment of 500,000 florins.

In the spring of 1368, Visconti allied with Cansignorio della Scala of Verona and attacked Mantua, still ruled by Ugolino Gonzaga. The situation was settled later in the year through an agreement between him and the emperor. Two years later he besieged Reggio, which he managed to acquire from Gonzaga in 1371. The following war against the Este of Modena and Ferrara raised Papal enmity against the Milanese again, now on the part of Gregory XI. In 1370, he ordered the construction of the Trezzo Bridge, then the largest single-arch bridge in the world.

In 1373, the pope sent two papal delegates to serve Bernabò and Galeazzo their excommunication papers (consisting of a parchment bearing a leaden seal rolled in a silken cord). Bernabò, infuriated, placed the two papal delegates under arrest and refused their release until they had eaten the parchment, seal, and silken cord which they had served him. He managed to resist, despite also the outbreak of a plague in Milan, whose consequences he suppressed with frantic energy. In 1378 he allied with the Republic of Venice in its War of Chioggia against Genoa. His troops were, however, defeated in September 1379 in the Val Bisagno.

Bernabò, whose despotism and taxes had enraged the Milanese, is featured among the exempla of tyrants as victims of Fortune in Chaucer's Monk's Tale as "god of delit and scourge of Lumbardye". He was deposed by his nephew Gian Galeazzo Visconti in 1385. Imprisoned in the castle of Trezzo, he died on 19 December of that year, presumably poisoned.

Bonino da Campione sculpted the equestrian statue of Bernabò Visconti for the church of San Giovanni in Conca around 1363. Its positioning near the church's main altar was regarded as highly problematic by contemporaries and it was commented on by poet and intellectual Petrarch among others. The equestrian statue was reused – with changes and additions carried out by the same Bonino in 1385–1386 – as Bernabò's funerary monument in the same church. It is now preserved in the Castello Sforzesco in Milan. An erratic small-size male head in marble now in the storerooms of Castello Sforzesco has recently been rediscovered and tentatively identified as a portrait of the elderly Bernabò. This work too has been attributed to Bonino da Campione.

== Children ==
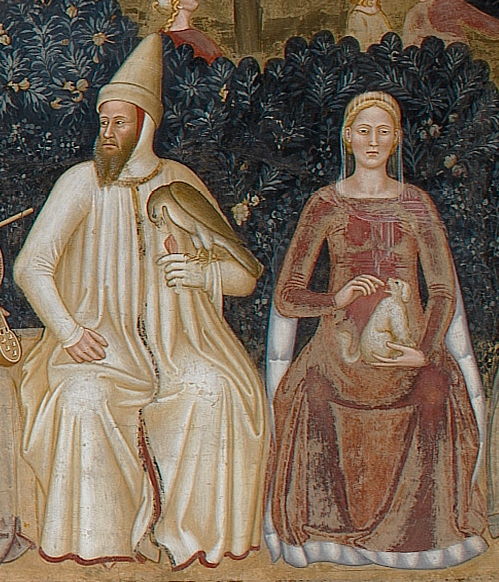
Bernabò and his wife, Beatrice

Bernabò was an ally of Stephen II, Duke of Bavaria: three of his daughters were married to Stephen's descendants. He had at least 15 legitimate children with his wife Beatrice Regina della Scala:

1. Taddea Visconti (1351 – 28 September 1381), married on 13 October 1364 Stephen III, Duke of Bavaria, of the Royal House of Wittelsbach. They had three children including Isabeau of Bavaria, Queen consort of King Charles VI of France of the Royal House of Valois
2. Verde Visconti (1352 – bef. 11 March 1414), married on 23 February 1365 Leopold III, Duke of Inner Austria
3. Marco Visconti (November 1353 – 3 January 1382), Lord of Parma in 1364; married in 1367 Elisabeth of Bavaria
4. Antonia Visconti (ca. 1354 – 26 March 1405), engaged in 1366 to King Frederick III of Sicily, but he died before the wedding took place; married 27 October 1380 Eberhard III, Count of Württemberg, of the Royal House of Württemberg, by whom she had three sons.
5. Lodovico Visconti (1355 – 7 March 1404), Governor and Lord of Parma during 1364–1404 and Governor of Lodi during 1379–1385; married in November 1381 Violante Visconti, widow of Lionel of Antwerp and Secondotto, Marquess of Montferrat. They had a son, Giovanni, who possibly left descendants: the family Milano-Visconti, Reichsfreiherren at Utrecht, claim descent from him.
6. Valentina Visconti (ca. 1357 – bef. September 1393), married in September 1378 King Peter II of Cyprus, of the Royal House of Lusignan, by whom she had one daughter who died in early infancy.
7. Carlo Visconti (September 1359 – August 1403), Lord of Cremona, Borgo San Donnino and Parma in 1379; married Beatrice of Armagnac, daughter of John II, Count of Armagnac and Jeanne de Périgord, by whom he had four children.
8. Caterina Visconti (1361 – 17 October 1404), married on 2 October 1380 as his second wife, Gian Galeazzo Visconti, 1st Duke of Milan, by whom she had two sons, Gian Maria Visconti, 2nd Duke of Milan; and Filippo Maria Visconti, 3rd Duke of Milan, who fathered Bianca Maria Visconti by his mistress Agnese del Maino.
9. Agnese Visconti (1362 – 7 February 1391), married 26 September 1380 Francesco I Gonzaga, of the House of Gonzaga, by whom she had one daughter. Agnes was executed for alleged adultery.
10. Rodolfo Visconti (ca. 1364 – January 1389), Lord of Bergamo, Soncino and Ghiara d'Adda in 1379. Unmarried.
11. Maddalena Visconti (ca. 1366 – 17 July 1404), married 9 April 1382 Frederick, Duke of Bavaria, by whom she had five children including Henry XVI of Bavaria.
12. Anglesia Visconti (ca. 1368 – 12 October 1439), married in January 1400 King Janus of Cyprus, but the union was childless and was dissolved in 1407/1409; he married in 1411 as his second wife, Charlotte de Bourbon-La Marche, of the Royal House of Bourbon, by whom he had six children.
13. Mastino Visconti (March 1371 – 19 June 1405), Lord of Bergamo, Valcamonica and Ghiaradadda in 1405; married in 1385 Cleofa della Scala, by whom he had three children.
14. Elisabetta Visconti (1374 – 2 February 1432), married on 26 January 1395 Ernest, Duke of Bavaria, by whom she had five children including Albert III, Duke of Bavaria.
15. Lucia Visconti (ca. 1380 – 14 April 1424), married firstly on 28 June 1399 Frederick of Thuringia (future Elector of Saxony) but the union was dissolved on grounds of non-consummation shortly after; married secondly on 24 January 1407 Edmund Holland, 4th Earl of Kent. No issue.

His illegitimate offspring by Donnina del Porri, legitimated in a ceremony after the death of his wife in 1384, (Note: Bernabò Visconti seems to have gone through some sort of marriage ceremony to legitimise his children by Donnina del Porri) were as follows:

- Palamede (d. 1402).
- Lancellotto (d. after 1413).
- Sovrana, married Giovanni de Prato.
- Ginevra, married Leonardo Malaspina, Marchese di Gragnola (d. 1441).

In addition, Bernabò had other illegitimate offspring by other mistresses:

—With Beltramola Grassi:

- Ambrogio (1343 – killed in battle Caprino Bergamasco, 17 August 1373), condottiero and Governor of Pavia.
- Enrica (born ca. 1344), married Franchino Rusconi dei Signori di Como.
- Margherita (ca. 1345 – d. after 1413), Abbess of the Convent of Santa Margherita.
- Ettore (ca. 1346 – 1413), who briefly took the Lordship of Milan (16 May – 12 June 1412), married Margherita Infrascati.

—With Montanina de Lazzari:

- Sagramoro (d. 1385), Lord of Brignano (1380), married Achiletta Marliani, this branch finished with two Ladies: Claudia Visconti of Brignano, married in 1581 to Lodovico Marazzani Landi Visconti (1602), Lord of Paderna and Villa del Riglio (1453), Lord of Castelnuovo and Fabiano (1492); from 1602, the Claudia Visconti di Brignano son, Gianfrancesco III Marazzani Visconti. Lodovico Marazzani Landi Visconti, Lord of Paderna, from 1605 Lodovico Count Marazzani Landi Visconti, Count of Paderna and Villa del Riglio, etc., and Flerida Visconti of Brignano married with Alessandro Marazzani Landi Lord of Paderna and Villa del Riglio and one Lord: Alessandro Visconti of Brignano, Doctor in Laws in Pavia University
- Donnina (1360–1406), married in 1377 to Sir John Hawkwood.

—With Beltameda Cassa:

- Elisabetta [Isotta] (d. 1388), married in 1378 to Count Lutz I von Landau, leader of the "Grand Company" of Condottiere in Italy.

—With Giovannola Montebretto:

- Bernarda (d. 1376), married Giovanni Suardi.

—With Caterina Freganeschi:

- Galeotto (d. after 1413).
- Riccarda, married Bernardon de la Salle.

—With unknown mistresses:

- Lionello (d. after 1404).
- Isabella.
- Damigella.
- Isotta, married (annulled 1382) Carlo Fogliani.
- Daughter, married Bernardo della Sala, Lord Soriano nel Cimino.
- Valentina (d. after 10 April 1414), married Antonio Visconti, Lord of Belgioioso.

== Footnotes ==
Italian nobility
Preceded by Cardinal Giovanni Visconti, Archbishop of Milan	Lord of Milan; 1349–1385	Succeeded by Gian Galeazzo Visconti
