= Bonino da Campione =

Italian Gothic sculptor (active 1350–1390)

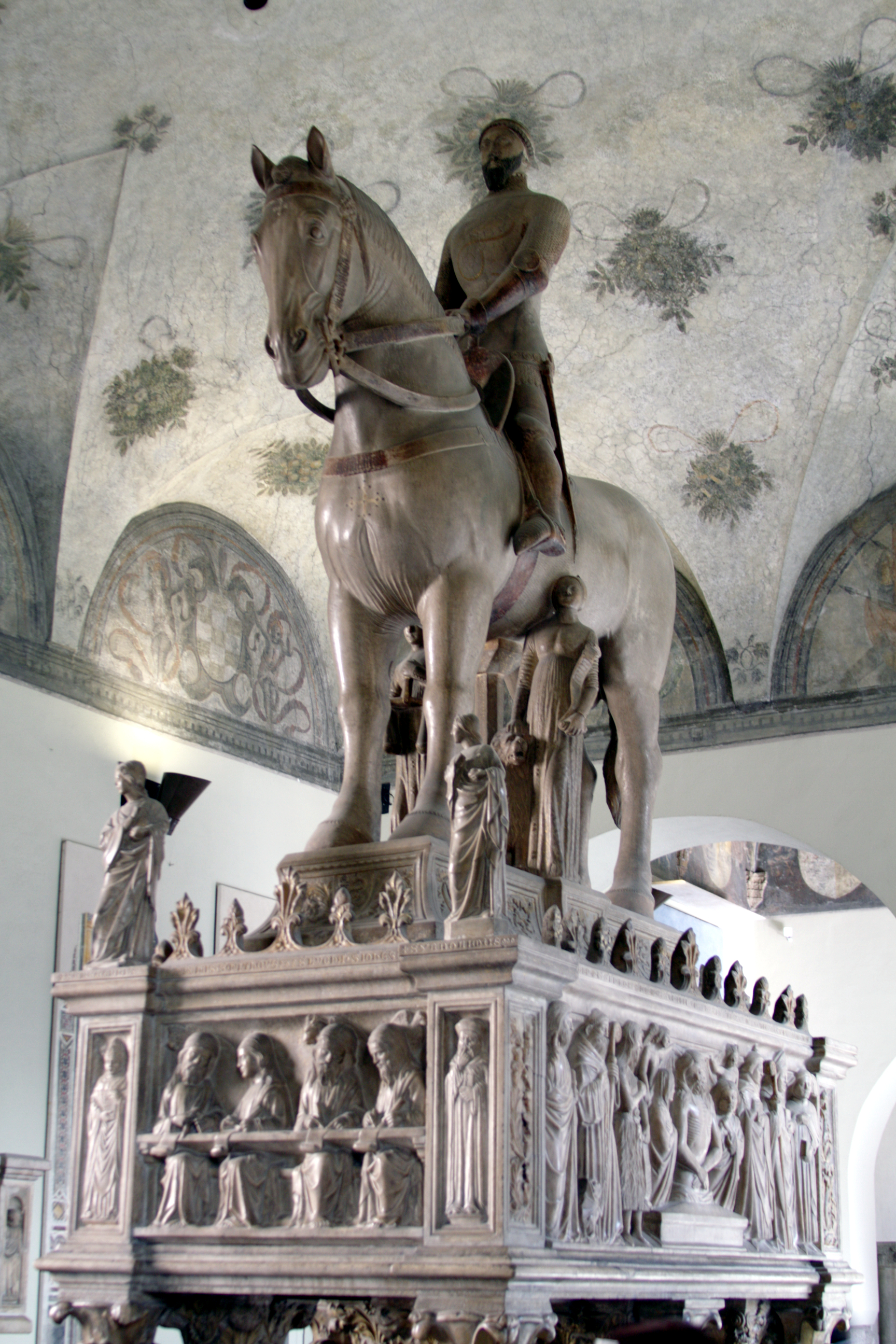
Monument to Bernabò Visconti.

Bonino da Campione was an Italian sculptor in the Gothic style, active between 1350 and 1390.

His name indicates that he was born in - or into a family originating in - Campione d'Italia, a Lombardy town in an enclave within Switzerland. His works include:

- the tomb of bishop Balduino Lambertini (1349) in the Old Cathedral in Brescia
- the Statue of Saint Theodore (1340-1350), in the church of San Teodoro in Pavia
- a monument to Folchino de'Schizzi (1357) in Cremona Cathedral
- the tomb of Saint Homobonus (now lost)
- one of the tombs for the Visconti family in the Basilica of Sant'Eustorgio in Milan
- an equestrian monument of Bernabò Visconti (1363), now in the Museum of Ancient Art at Castello Sforzesco, Milan
- the monument to Cansignorio della Scala (1374) at Santa Maria Antica, Verona.
- miniature sculpture of Madonna with Child Madonna Litta (1370–75), now located in the Museum of Ancient Art at Castello Sforzesco, Milan
