= Stefano Visconti =

Italian nobleman (1287–1327)

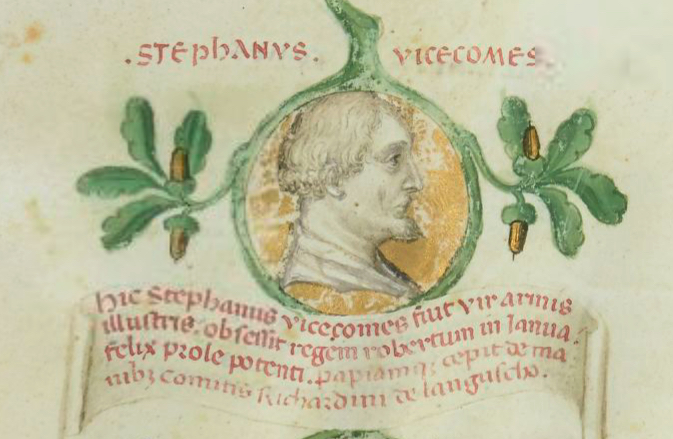

- Coat of arms
- Born: c. 1287; Milan
- Died: 4 July 1327; Milan
- Noble family: Visconti
- Spouse: Valentina Doria
- Issue: Matteo II Visconti; Galeazzo II Visconti; Bernabò Visconti
- Father: Matteo I
- Mother: Bonacossa Borri

Stefano Visconti (c. 1287 – 4 July 1327) was a member of the House of Visconti that ruled Milan from the 14th to the 15th century.

== Life ==
He was the son of Matteo I Visconti.

=== Marriage ===
In 1318 he married Valentina Doria, daughter of Bernabò Doria from Sassello and of Eliena Fieschi, with whom he had three children:

- Grandiana (also known as Diana) who married around 1333 Ramon de Vilaragut, Baron of Tripi and Lord of Alcaissia and Sollana, Captain-General and Admiral of the Army of the Kingdom of Sicily;
- Matteo II who married Egidiola Gonzaga
- Galeazzo II who married Blanche of Savoy
- Bernabò, who shared the rule in Milan after his death and married Beatrice della Scala.

The marriage between Valentina and Stefano was to cement an alliance between their fathers wherein the Ghibelline party (of which the Viscontis were members) would aid Valentina's father Bernabo Doria to destroy the Genoese Guelphs.

== Death ==
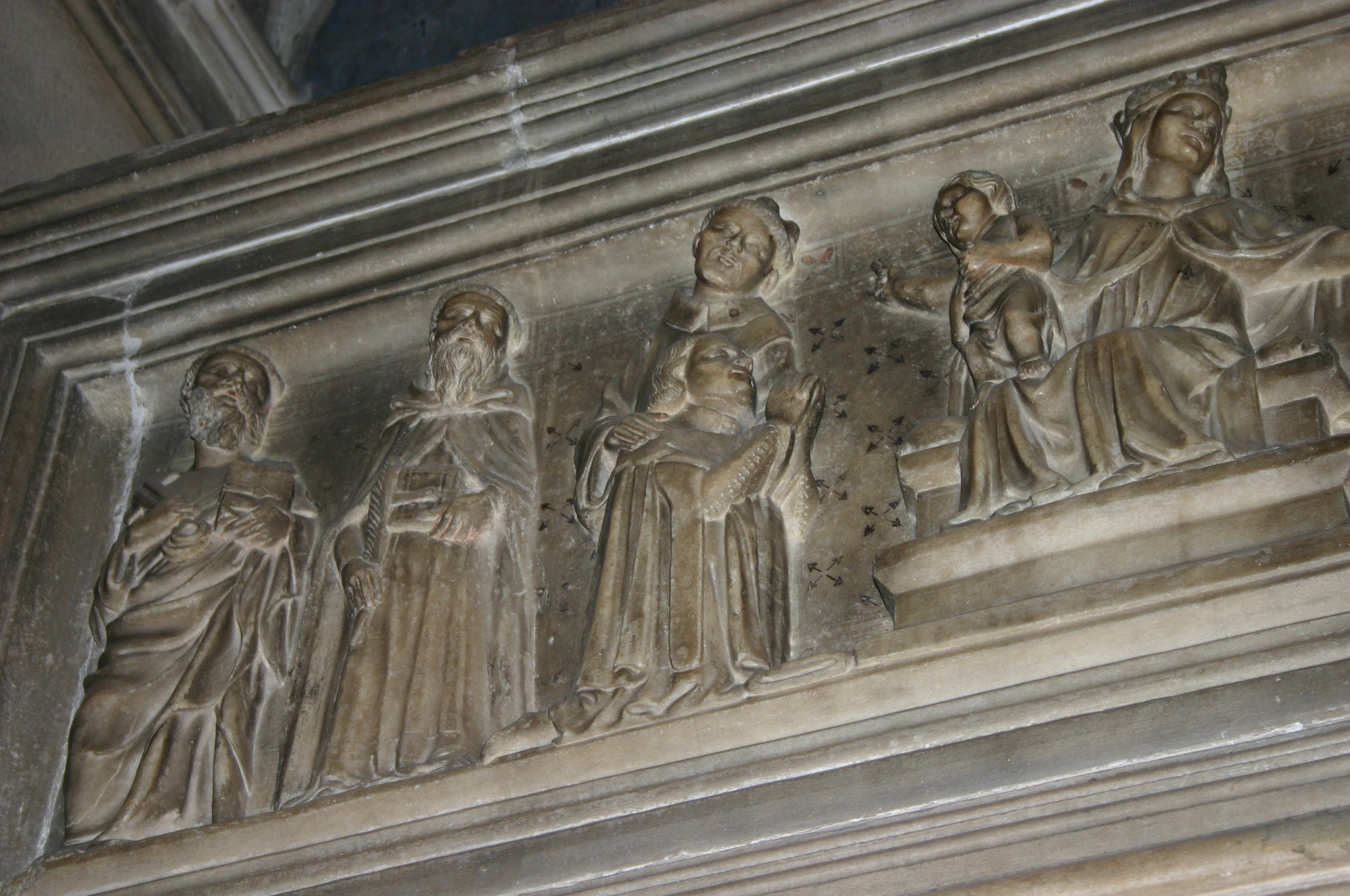
Stefano Visconti (kneeling). Portrait from his grave.

Stefano died on the night of 4 July 1327, after a banquet he gave for the coronation of Louis the Bavarian as King of Italy.

Stefano's contemporaries linked his death to an attempted poisoning of the King, leading to the imprisonment of three of Stefano's four brothers, Galeazzo, Giovanni, and Luchino, as well as his nephew, the future Lord of Milan, Azzo Visconti, in the fortress of Monza: This event marked a crisis in relations between the Holy Roman Empire and the Visconti.

The magnificent tomb of Stefano and his wife Valentina, carved in 1359 by Bonino da Campione, is located in the Basilica Sant'Eustorgio in Milan.

== Ancestry ==
Ancestors of Stefano Visconti

16. Uberto Visconti
8. Obizzo Visconti
17. Berta Pirovano
4. Teobaldo Visconti
18. Ruffino Mandelli
9. Fiorina Mandelli
19. Aldesia Pietrasanta
2. Matteo I Visconti, Lord of Milan
20. Uberto IV. Pirovano
10. Ubertus Pirovano
21.
5. Anastasia Pirovano
22.
11. Casati
23.
1. Stefano Visconti, Lord of Milan
24. Lanzo Borri
12. Lanfranco or Ruffino Borri
25. Elsie Bouve
6. Squarcino Borri
26.
13.
27.
3. Bonacossa Borri
28.
14.
29.
7. Antonia
30.
15.
31.

== Sources ==
- Paoletti, John T; Radke, Gary M (1997). "Genealogies (appendix)". Art in Renaissance Italy. New York: H.N. Abrams. p. 517. ISBN 9780810919785. OCLC 36482283.
