= Jacopo I da Carrara =

Lord of Padua

Jacopo or Giacomo I da Carrara, called the Great (Grande), was the founder of the Carraresi dynasty that ruled Padua from 1318 to 1405. He governed with the advice of the leading citizens during a rule characterized by unity within the city. He is usually considered the first lord of Padua (signore), his election marking the transition from commune ad singularem dominum (to a single lord), a characteristic regime known as a signoria to contemporaries.

Jacopo, a Guelph, led the Paduans to war against Verona in 1311 over the disputed possession of Vicenza. In response to the threat of the Ghibellines and continuous internal feuding, shortly after 25 July 1318 the Paduan aristocracy elected Jacopo as defensor, protector, and gubernator in perpetuity. Jacopo's election owed something to an alliance between Padua's own Ghibelline and Guelph factions, and after his election many Ghibelline exiles returned. Jacopo sent the poet Albertino Mussato, who objected to the signoria and pined for the old commune, into exile that year. In 1319 the Ghibelline Cangrande I della Scala besieged Padua and demanded the abdication of Jacopo in return for peace. Jacopo stepped down temporarily to save the city; the signoria was transferred to Frederick the Fair, a contender for the Holy Roman Empire. In the end Jacopo succeeded in preventing Padua from falling to either the Scaligeri or the Scrovegni.

Jacopo was married to Anna, daughter of Pietro Gradenigo, Doge of Venice and Tomasina Morosini, the niece of Tomasina Morosini. Anna gave him one daughter, Taddea, and died in 1321. He himself died in 1324 and was buried in the Church of the Eremitani in Padova. Taddea moved to Venice on her father's death and there married Cangrande's nephew Mastino II della Scala in the Church of San Giorgio Maggiore.

== Sources ==
- Ganguzza Billanovich, M. Chiara (1977). "CARRARA, Giacomo da". Dizionario Biografico degli Italiani (in Italian). Vol. 20: Carducci–Carusi. Rome: Istituto dell'Enciclopedia Italiana. ISBN 978-88-12-00032-6.
- Kohl, Benjamin G. (1998). Padua under the Carrara, 1318–1405. Baltimore and London: Johns Hopkins University Press. ISBN 0-8018-5703-1.
