= Mastino II della Scala =

Lord of Verona from 1329 to 1351

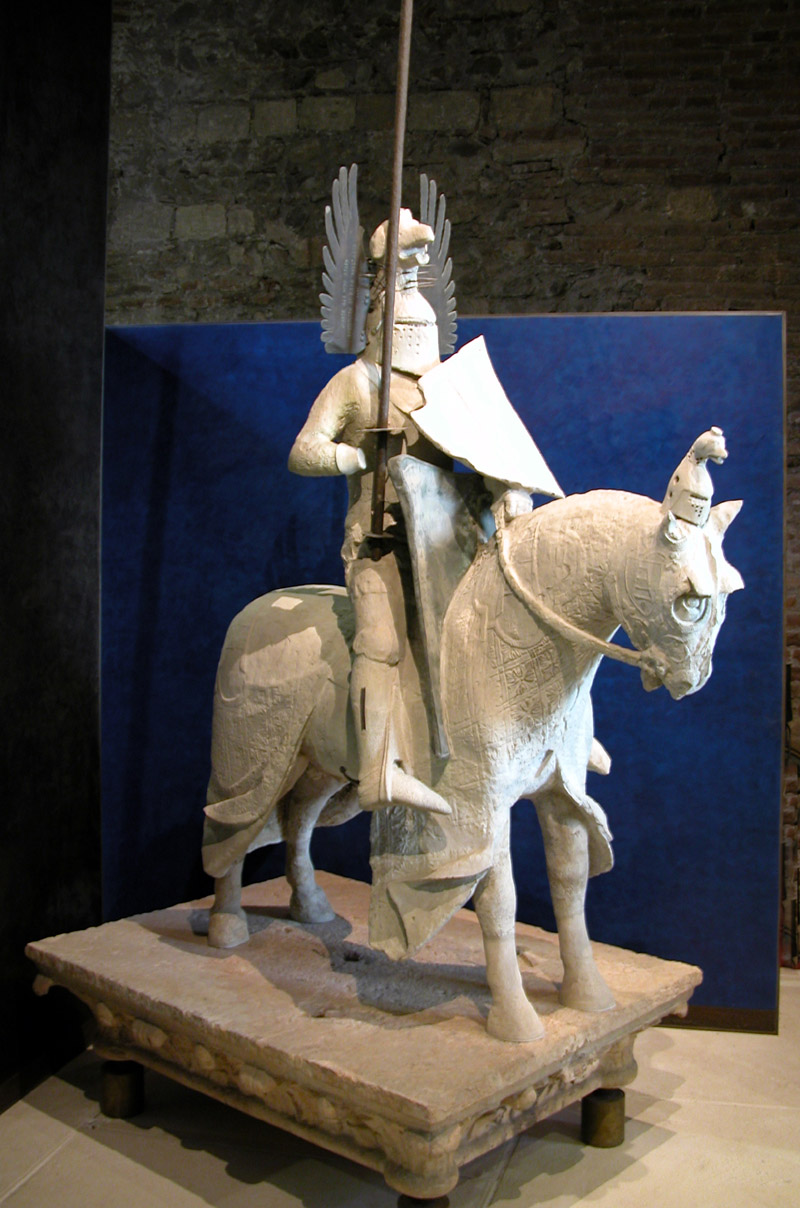
- Statue of Mastino II della Scala. Once located on the top of his tomb, one of the Scaliger Tombs, it is now in the Castelvecchio Museum at Verona.
- Born: 1308; Verona
- Died: 3 June 1351; Verona
- Noble family: Scaliger
- Spouse: Taddea da Carrara
- Issue: Cangrande II della Scala; Cansignorio della Scala; Paolo Alboino della Scala; Beatrice Regina della Scala
- Father: Alboino I della Scala
- Mother: Beatrice da Correggio

Mastino II della Scala (1308 – 3 June 1351) was lord of Verona. He was a member of the famous Scaliger family of Northern Italy.

He was the son of Alboino I della Scala and Beatrice da Correggio. At the death of Cangrande I, he and his brother Alberto II were associated with the rule of Verona. Soon, however, Mastino's independent attitude overshadowed his brother's presence. In the first part of his reign, abandoning the careful policy of balance held by his father, he conquered Brescia (1332), Parma (1335) in Lombardy and Lucca (1335) in Tuscany.

However, the extension of Mastino's power spurred the creation of the league of all the other local powers (Florence, Siena, Bologna, Perugia and Venice). In the first year of the subsequent war, he managed to resist, but in 1337 the League was joined by Azzone Visconti of Milan, the Este of Ferrara, the Gonzaga of Mantua and the Papal States. Surrounded by every side, he could only ask for a treaty of peace through the intermediation of Emperor Louis IV of Bavaria, which he obtained in 1339. His territories were restricted to Verona and Vicenza, the remaining part split among the victorious enemies.

An attempt to recover part of his lands with the German mercenaries that had remained in Vicenza after the war, led by Lodrisio Visconti, was unsuccessful.

He died in Verona in 1351. He is buried in the Gothic mausoleum near the church of Santa Maria Antica, in one of the Scaliger Tombs.

== Family ==
In 1328 he married Taddea da Carrara (daughter of Jacopo I of Padua) and Anna Gradenigo (daughter of Pietro Gradenigo).

Issue

- Verde (d. 1394) married Niccolò II d'Este, Marquis of Ferrara
- Cangrande (1332–1359) Married to Elisabeth of Bavaria daughter of Louis IV, Holy Roman Emperor
- Alboino (1333–1375)
- Cansignorio (c. 1334–1375) Married to Agnes of Durazzo
- Beatrice Regina della Scala (1331 – 18 June 1384), who married Bernabò Visconti on 27 September 1350
- Caterina married to the condottiero Aldrighetto di Castelbarco
- Altaluna,(1338-?) who married Louis of Bavaria
- Veronese, who married Giacomo Trissino
- Giovanni

His illegitimate children include:

- Fregnano (died 1394)
- Margherita Became a nun.
- Aimonte (?- -?) Prior at San Giorgio in Braida
- Pietro (1330-1392), Bishop of Lodi
- A daughter married in 1342 to Giacomo Pepoli

Mastino II della Scala Scaliger Born: 1308 Died: 3 June 1351
Preceded by Cangrande I della Scala	Lord of Verona and Vicenza; 1329–1351; With Alberto II	Succeeded by Alberto II della Scala
Preceded by Cangrande I della Scala	Lord of Padua; With Alberto II; 1329–1337	Succeeded by Marsilio da Carrara
