= Caterina Visconti (died 1382) =

Caterina Visconti was the daughter of Matteo II Visconti and Egidiola Gonzaga.

== Life ==
Caterina Visconti was the eldest daughter of Matteo and Egidiola (also known as Gigliola).

Caterinas paternal grandparents were Stefano Visconti and Valentina Doria and her maternal grandparents were Filippino Gonzaga and Anna Dovara.

In 1346,Caterinas great-uncle Luchino Visconti exiled her father to Montferrat, but he was able to return in 1350 after the accession of his uncle Giovanni Visconti.

Caterinas father Matteo had since 1354 co-ruled Milan with his brothers, Galeazzo II Visconti and Bernabo Visconti. Matteo died in 1355, it being commonly believed that his brothers had conspired to poison him to gain the lordship over Milan.

One of the persons accusing the brothers was their own mother Valentina Doria.

In 1356, Caterinas grandfather Filippino Gonzaga died. His only living child was Caterinas mother. Egidiolas male cousins who wanted Filippinos lands took them by force, but in 1358 the Gonzagas signed a treaty with the Viscontis which obligated them to turn over the lands they had seized.

== Marriage ==
Caterina Visconti was married to her mother's cousin, the twice widowed, Ugolino Gonzaga in October 1358. After her mothers relatives had been forced cede the lands of which her mother Egidiola was the rightful heir, it seemed more logical to acquire the lands through marriage. Any children born from the marriage of Caterina and Ugolino would be the natural heir. They would go on to have a son Bernabo, but he died young.

Gonzaga had close ties to the Viscontis because the first of his wives having been Verde della Scala, who was the sister of Caterinas aunt, Beatrice Regina della Scala. It was also rumored that Ugolino had had an affair with Isabella Fieschi, the wife of Caterinas great-uncle Luchino Visconti in 1347.

From Ugolinos second marriage to Emilia della Gherardesca, he had a daughter Teodora who was just four years younger than her sixteen-year old step-mother.

Ugolino governed Mantua alongside his father and his brothers Francesco and Ludovico beginning in 1360, but just two years later he was assassinated by his two brothers Ludovico II Gonzaga and Francesco in 1362.

Caterinas mother, Egidiola died in 1377.

Caterina Visconti also had a younger sister Andreola who became the abbess of the convent of San Maurizio. Andreola would in 1376 along with their cousin Bernarda (an illegitimate daughter of Bernabo) be imprisoned and accused of committing adultery. Bernarda died but Andreola lived until 1386.

Caterina Visconti died on 10 October 1382 in Milan.
