= Lordship of Milan =

Former lordship in Italy (1259–1395)

- 1259–1395
- Flag (1277–1395) Coat of arms (1277–1395)

- The Lordship in the 14th century
- Capital: Milan
- Common languages: Latin; Old Lombard
- Religion: Roman Catholicism
- Government: Signoria
- Lord
  - 1259–1263: Martino della Torre (first)
  - 1385–1395: Gian Galeazzo Visconti (last)
- History
  - Martino della Torre is elected lord of Milan: 1259
  - The Visconti family took over the lordship after the Battle of Desio.: 21 January 1277
  - The Visconti are deposed by the Della Torre.: 1302
  - The Della Torre family is deposed and exiled. The Visconti are re-enthroned.: 1311
  - Wenceslaus IV of Bohemia awards the title of Duke to Gian Galeazzo Visconti: 5 September 1395
- Currency: Soldo
Preceded by	Succeeded by
Commune of Milan	Duchy of Milan
- Today part of: Italy; Switzerland

The Lordship of Milan was a state in Northern Italy created in May 1259 following the election of Martino della Torre as lord of Milan. From 1259 to 1277 it was governed by the Della Torre family until, following the Battle of Desio, Napo della Torre was forced to yield his position to Ottone Visconti. The domination of the Visconti dynasty led to a series of territorial conquests that led the family to achieve the title of Dukes of Milan in 1395.

== Background ==
=== The crisis of the Commune ===
Like many Italian medieval communes, starting from the 12th century, Milan also equipped itself with a consular government. The consuls constituted an oligarchic government in which the most important families of Milan had a say. In 1130 Milan was governed by twenty-three consuls and already at that time the Della Torre and Visconti families were represented. The consuls were divided into two main orders: that of the captains, the most noble class, and that of the valvassors, who had already organised themselves in the corporation of the Motta in 1035. Following a protest in 1198, the captains and the Motta were joined by the Credenza di Sant'Ambrogio, an assembly composed of members of the bourgeois and popular classes. Following the formation of the Credenza, the three factions began to become increasingly quarrelsome and began a long series of battles which culminated in 1225 with the victory of the Credenza and the decisive reduction of the power of the captains.

=== The rise of the Della Torre family ===
By now in crisis in 1240 the noble faction suffered a split led by Pagano della Torre, who decided to merge with the Credenza di Sant'Ambrogio which appointed him Podestà. Already coming from an important family, della Torre gained greater popularity when in 1237 he gave refuge in his possessions in Valsassina to what remained of the Milanese army that had been defeated in the Battle of Cortenuova. Della Torre governed the city until his death on 6 January 1241. In this short period of government he was able to form alliances with the powerful maritime republics of Venice and Genoa, and also extended the Milanese land registry, managing to lower taxes and calm the constant discontent of the citizens.

In 1246 the clashes between the popular faction and that of the captains resumed, thus making the regular administration of the commune impossible. Following the riots, on 26 May 1247 the Papal legate Gregorio di Montelongo conferred the position of Elder of the Credenza to Pagano's nephew, Martino della Torre, who reorganised the municipal powers. In a short time the fights between the Credenza and the aristocrats resumed and in 1253 Manfred II Lancia was called to govern the city, but after three years he decided to pass to the Ghibelline party, leaving Milan. With the power vacuum the war resumed and on 5 April 1257 before coming to a new clash the captains and the Motta, allied against the Credenza still led by Martino della Torre, agreed to the truce of Parabiago which was followed by the Peace of Sant'Ambrogio on 4 April 1258.

In the meantime also in Como the struggle between the popular class, represented by the Vittani, and the noble class, led by the Rusconi family, resumed. Thus in June 1258, only three months after the Peace of Sant'Ambrogio, the captains of Milan rushed to the aid of the Rusconi and this intervention provoked the prompt reaction of the Credenza which, by sending its troops, led the Vittani to victory who appointed Martino della Torre as podestà of Como. Following these events in July the peace agreement was broken. To avoid further disorder, on March 30, 1259, in the Basilica of Santa Tecla, the election of a leader was proposed: Martino della Torre was a candidate on the side of the Credenza, Azzolino Marcellino for the Motta, and finally Guglielmo da Soresina for the nobles. Numerically, the candidate of the Credenza won, but the Motta rebelled against the choice and decided to ally itself with the captains and support Guglielmo da Soresina.

Despite the election of Della Torre, the Motta allied itself with the nobles and acclaimed Guglielmo da Soresina as leader. At that point, the stalemate was broken by the papal legate, the archbishop Embrun Enrico da Susa, who invited Soresina and della Torre to leave the city to find an agreement. Della Torre went to Como where he was podestà, gathered an army and entered Milan, and as a result, the Credenza named him lord of Milan, thus establishing the Signoria of Milan.

== History ==
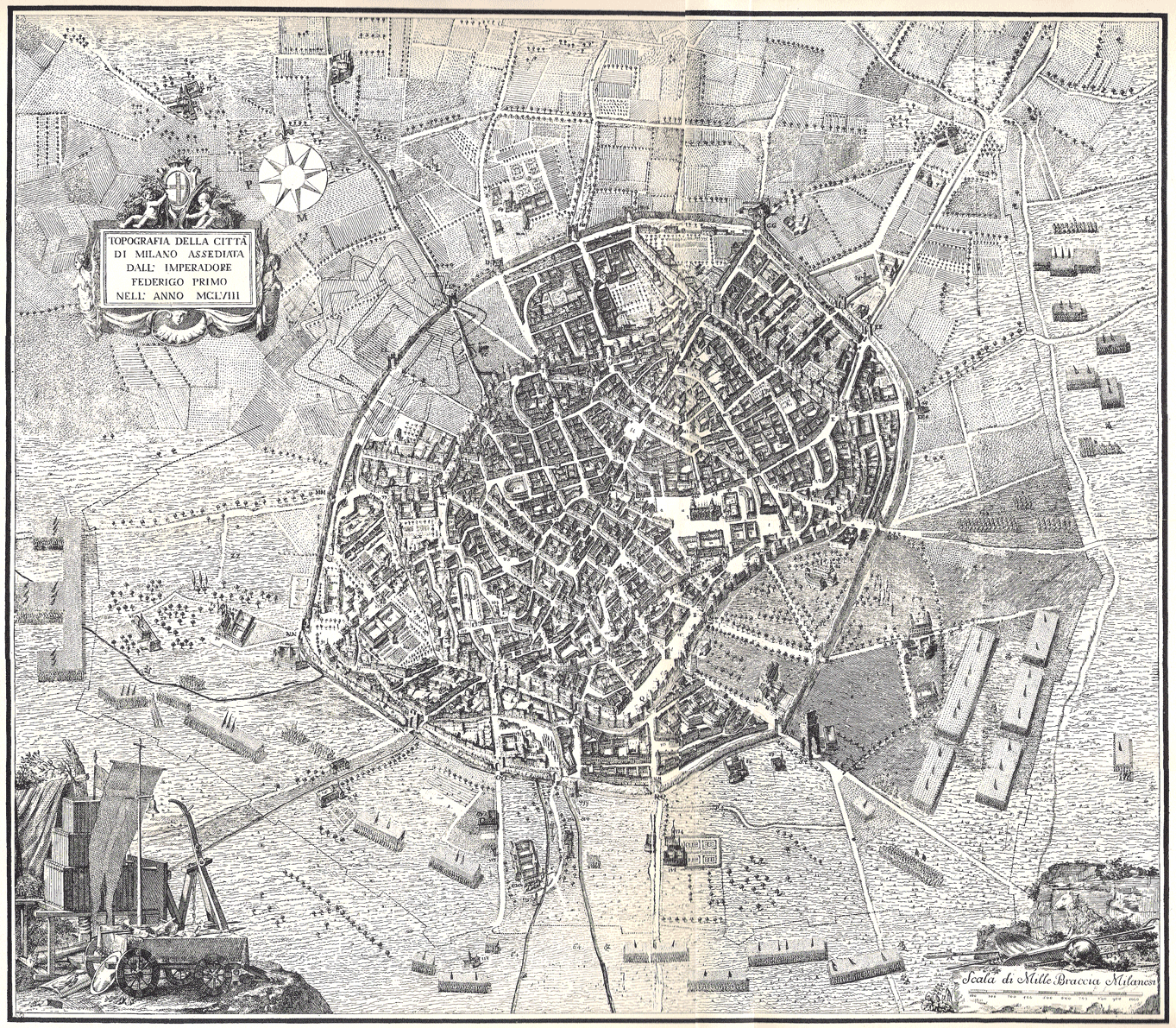
The city of Milan in the Middle Ages.

Martino della Torre thus became the first lord of Milan in May 1259, as a first measure he decided to banish the da Soresina family from the city so as not to have any opposition to the government. A few days later, on 17 September, he decided to ally himself with the Papal States to defeat the major supporter of da Soresina family, Ezzelino III da Romano, who was killed on 8 October 1259 following the Battle of Cassano. After eliminating his enemies, della Torre thought about finding new allies, so on 11 November Oberto Pallavicino was appointed captain general of Milan for five years despite the papal excommunication and as a result, the following year Pope Alexander IV decided to excommunicate Martino della Torre as well. Despite the centralization of powers, della Torre was unable to have his cousin Raimondo, a direct descendant of Pagano, elected bishop, who was instead assigned to the Diocese of Como. Ottone Visconti took office as Archbishop of Milan on 22 July 1262, provoking the wrath of the lord of Milan, who forced Visconti, with the help of Pallavicino, to take refuge in Montefiascone in the Papal States. A few months after Visconti's retreat, on 20 November 1263 Martino della Torre died in Lodi. Due to his excommunication, he was buried near the Chiaravalle Abbey and not inside it.

The Credenza di Sant'Ambrogio elected Filippo della Torre, brother of Martino, as the new lord of Milan. In December 1263 Filippo annexed Como to the lordship of Milan thanks to the support of the local Vittiani family, and on 11 December 1264, following the expiration of his mandate, Oberto II Pallavicino was expelled from Milan, effectively becoming an enemy of the Della Torre family. In 1265 della Torre offered military aid to the Papal States in exchange for the election of his cousin Raimondo and the deposition of Ottone Visconti, but the proposal was again rejected by Pope Clement IV, who had recently taken office on the papal throne. On 24 September 1265 Filippo della Torre died, leaving the conflicts with the church unresolved. Despite this, Filippo managed to form a united front led by Milan and followed by the cities of: Bergamo, Como, Lecco, Lodi, Monza, Novara, Varese, Vercelli and Brescia, thanks also to the alliances and family connections with the powerful Maggi family.

=== Napo della Torre ===
In 1265, following the death of Filippo, the Lordship of Milan passed to Napo della Torre, son of Pagano, who was supported by his brothers Francesco and Paganino. Francesco was named lord of Seprio, while Paganino became podestà of Vercelli. Pallavicino's revenge was not long in coming and on 29 January 1266 Paganino was assassinated by a band of proscribed Milanese nobles aided by some Pavia men employed by Pallavicino. Following the killing of his brother, Napo della Torre had the thirteen conspirator nobles beheaded and also gave the order to behead twelve nobles locked up in Milanese prisons following the battle of Tabiago and another twenty-eight nobles locked up in the prisons of Trezzo sull'Adda. To avoid further intrusions by his now former ally Oberto II Pallavicino, on 23 March 1266 Napo decided to summon the representatives of the cities of the Lombard League. Once the Pallavicino problem had been resolved, Napo also had to deal with the long-standing dispute regarding the archbishopric of Milan which had begun in 1259. Under pressure from the Pope, on 7 December 1266 Milan decided to accept the nomination of Ottone Visconti, following which all the Milanese were absolved from excommunication, but as a precaution Ottone remained in Viterbo.

From 1267 to 1274 the lordship of the della Torre family was established, and for the following years Napo and his brother Francesco managed to govern the Lordship in relative tranquility. During this period there was an improvement in relations with the Kingdom of France, who stipulated better agreements with Milan regarding the wool trade. In April 1270 Milan waged war on Lodi which fell 3 months later, under the siege of Napo, who became lord of the city. In 1271 due to the continuous wars and the increase in taxes, countless revolts against Milanese rule followed: first Brescia and then Lodi, Como, Crema, Cremona and Novara. After having directed his troops again against Pavia, on 6 June 1274 Napo signed a peace treaty with Pavia and Novara.

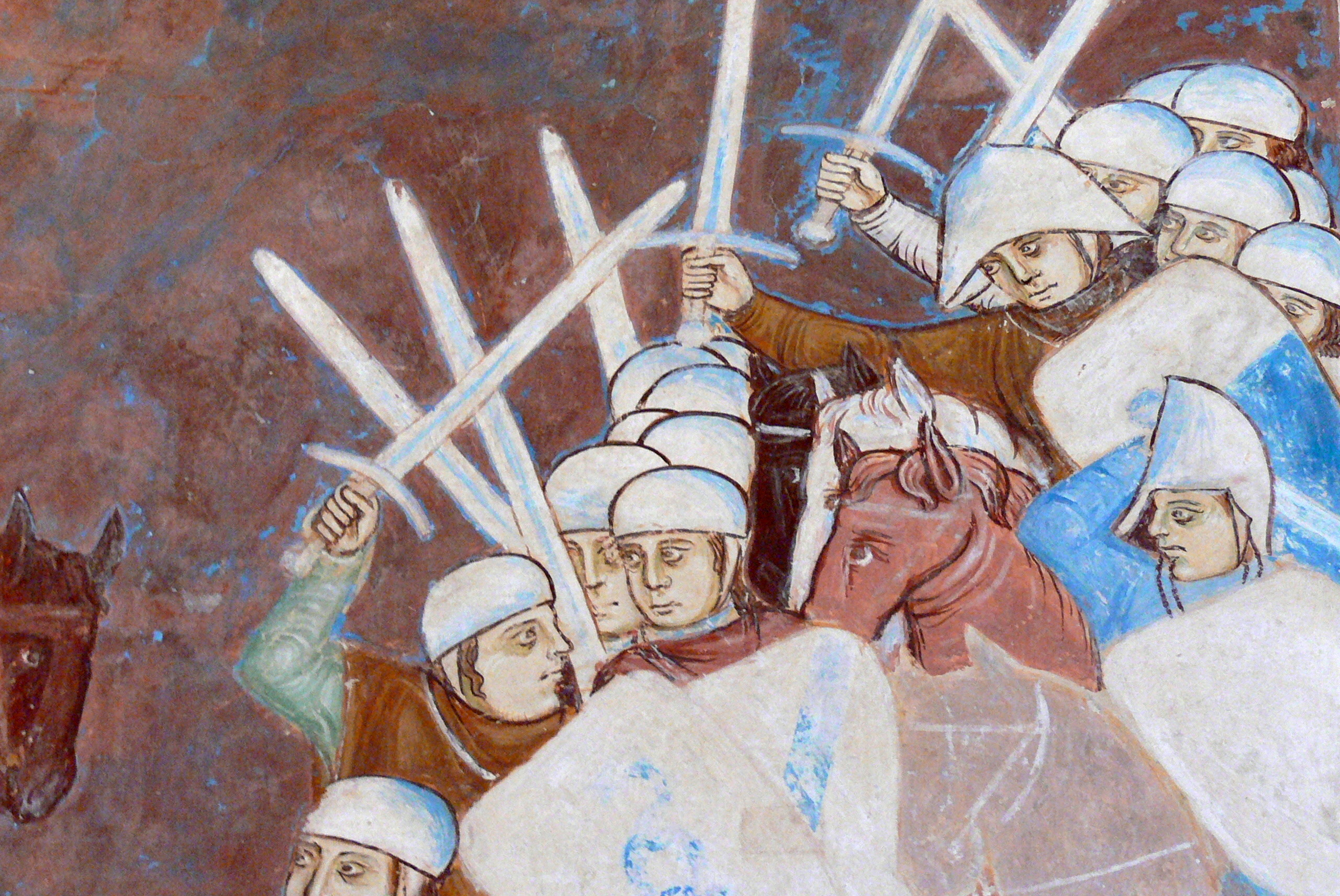
Fresco in the Rocca Borromeo di Angera depicting the battle of Desio in which the Della Torre family lost their dominance over Milan

The rivalry with Ottone Visconti increased and Napo Della Torre decided to send 6000 men to defend the city of Milan. In this period in fact there are episodes of guerrilla warfare by Pavia and rebel factions. Della Torre, however, managed to defeat the Pavia army and kill their commander Goffredo di Langosco. Della Torre also managed to take several prisoners including Teobaldo Visconti, nephew of the archbishop Ottone and father of Matteo I Visconti. Ottone then decided to occupy Castelseprio, but was put to flight by Napo. After having won the important battle of Guazzera in 1276, near Ranco in the Varese area, and subsequently lost the battle of Germignaga, fought for the possession of the fortress of Angera, which however remained in the hands of the Della Torre family.

Napo della Torre was defeated and captured in the Battle of Desio on 21 January 1277 by Archbishop Ottone Visconti. He died the following year in captivity in the Castle of Baradello near Como. His brother Francesco was killed during the same battle. His son Corrado, known as "Mosca", and Guido, son of Francesco, were also taken prisoner, but managed to escape from the castle in 1284. With the arrival of the Visconti in Milan, the possessions of the della Torre were plundered. From this moment on, the della Torre organized a relentless guerrilla warfare against the Visconti, aided by Friuli and the cities of the Po Valley loyal to them.

Under the rule of Napo della Torre, Milan was modernized by a large program of public works that radically transformed it, making it the true metropolis of Northern Italy. Construction began on a church where the Church of San Bernardino alle Ossa now stands, and two years later construction began on the church of Santi Simone e Giuda. On May 20, 1271, Napo ordered the main streets to be paved, starting with Porta Nuova and Porta Orientale, and in the same year the stretch of canal between Milan and Abbiategrasso was completed. In May 1272, the construction of a tower in the new Palazzo della Ragione was decided.

=== Ottone Visconti ===
In 1277 Ottone Visconti reorganized the state assemblies and drew up a list containing the 200 noble families admitted to the city. Ottone was forced to face the della Torre in Lodi and was aided by William VII, Marquis of Montferrat who was appointed captain general on Ottone's proposal for 10 years. On 11 May 1278 Cassone della Torre took over Lodi with the help of the imperial troops and of the Patriarch of Aquileia Raimondo della Torre and on 13 July the Della Torre troops led by Cassone della Torre managed to defeat the Visconti by entering the village of Porta Ticinese. Meanwhile, William VII's expansionist aims forced Ottone Visconti to relieve him of his duties on 15 September 1278. Cassone, however, attacked Visconti at the city of Gorgonzola and, due to the great defeat, was forced to ask William for help and in November of the same year he conferred upon him the office of Perpetual Lord of Milan, as previously requested. On 25 May 1281, in the battle at Vaprio d'Adda between the della Torre and the Visconti, the della Torre army was defeated. The patriarch Raimondo returned to Friuli and Lodi obtained peace with Milan on condition of expelling all the Milanese Guelph exiles. In December of the same year, William VII of Montferrat was expelled from Milan and Ottone ensured his succession by adopting Guido da Castiglione. In March 1285, Goffredo della Torre, after having gathered mercenaries in Bergamo and Como, entered the Milanese territory and took possession of Castelseprio which was destroyed by the Visconti two years later.

=== Matteo I Visconti ===
In December 1287, Matteo I Visconti was appointed Capitano del popolo and immediately revised the municipal statutes, he was then appointed lord of Milan in 1291. In September 1290 the marquis William VII, of Montferrat marched towards Milan with the della Torre family. Having arrived at Morimondo, facing the army of Ottone Visconti he retreated, escaped to Alessandria where however he was captured and locked in a cage, where he remained for a year and a half until his death in 1292. In 1297 Matteo Visconti built the Castle of Novara and the Visconti chapel in the Basilica of Sant'Eustorgio and the bell tower which was completed in 1309 and was equipped with the first public clock in Milan.

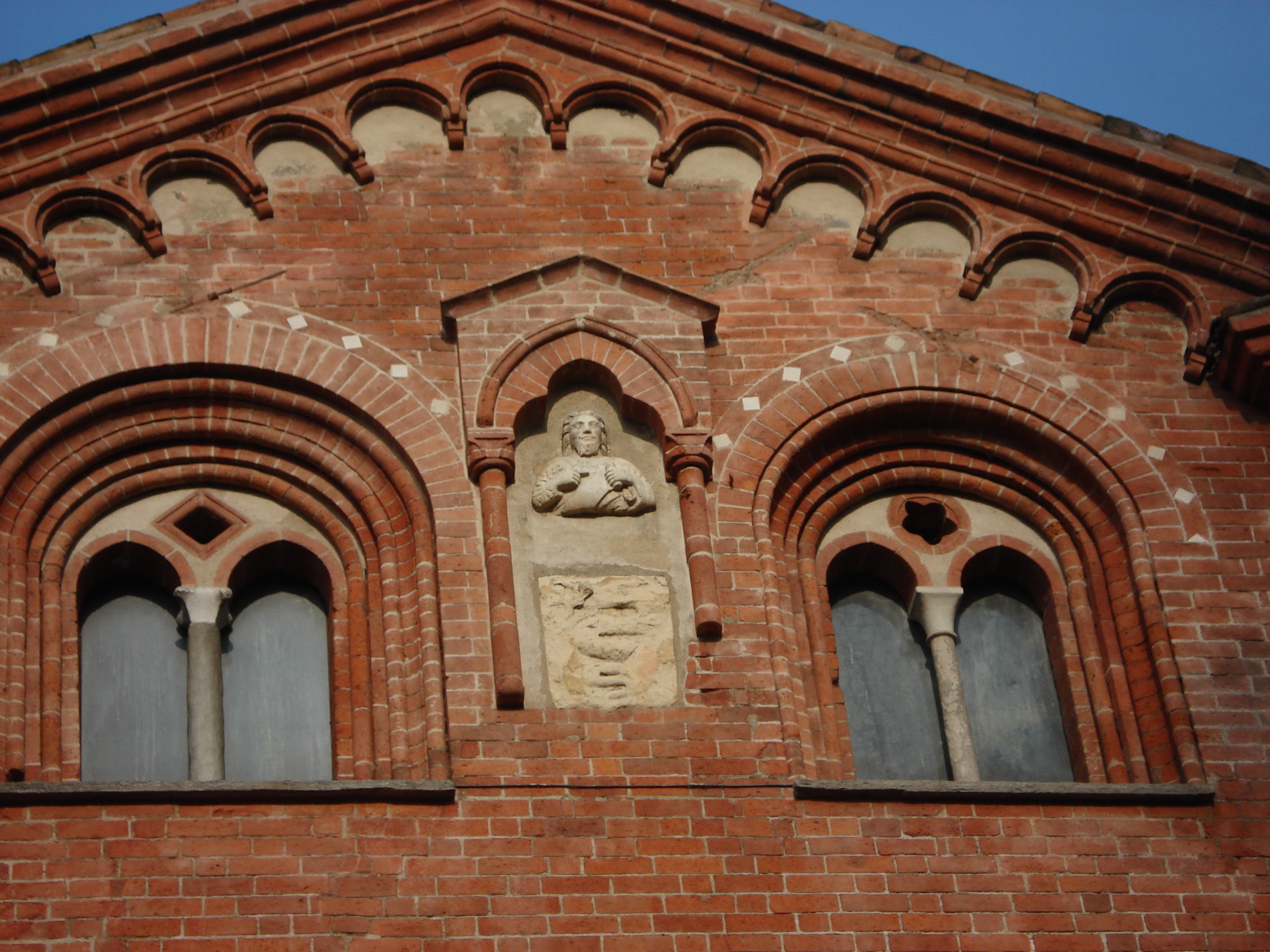
The Basilica of Sant'Eustorgio in Milan, with a bust of Matteo I Visconti, atop of the coats of arms of the House of Visconti

In May 1301 Visconti proposed the nomination of his son Galeazzo I as captain of the people, but his relatives Albertone Visconti, Landolfo Borri, Corrado da Soresina, Pietro Visconti conspired against him without success. Matteo was then called to Bergamo to reconcile the local families and became captain of the people for 5 years and right here in Bergamo on 6 July 1301 John I, Marquis of Montferrat together with the della Torre and the cities of Novara, Vercelli, Pavia, Como and Cremona were definitively defeated. In April 1302 the della Torre family members Corrado, Erecco and Martino son of Cassone reappeared in Lodi together with the anti-Visconti league with Cremona, Pavia, Piacenza, Novara, Vercelli, Lodi, Crema and the Marquisate of Monferrato, under the leadership of Alberto Scotti. After the capture of Pietro Visconti in Bisentrate in June 1302, the spirits of his relatives were rekindled and they gathered an army of 10,000 men. On 13 June the Visconti palace was sacked and destroyed by the della Torre and their opposing relatives. Matteo resorted to the mediation of Venice to negotiate peace, but with the Peace of Pioltello the Della Torre forced him to abandon the government of Milan.

=== The return of Della Torre rule ===
The power of the della Torre family returns to the city but they are opposed by part of the population, while Matteo Visconti takes refuge in Nogarola as a guest of the Scaligeri, lords of Verona. In May 1303 Visconti occupies Bellinzona then Varese and the following year Brescia and then Martinengo. In the meantime the della Torre family had entered into conflict with Alberto Scotti who they manage to defeat in 1304. On 17 December 1307 Guido della Torre is appointed Captain of the people for a year and then appointed Perpetual Captain on 22 September 1308. In 1311 Guido della Torre, having come into conflict with the archbishop Cassone della Torre, son of Corrado, his cousin, broke the family unity that had been the strength of the Della Torre dynasty and, after having tried to make the people rebel against the Holy Roman Emperor Henry VII, was forced to flee, losing the lordship which returned to the Visconti. Thus the power of the della Torre family over the lordship of Milan definitively fades.

=== Visconti rule ===
The city dominion returned definitively into Visconti hands only on 20 September 1313 when Matteo Visconti was again appointed lord of Milan for life. The Della Torre, allies of Pavia, resumed the fight with the Visconti and on 24 September were defeated at Rho, Lombardy. The Della Torre obtained papal support so much so that on 28 May 1317 the pope deemed Matteo's lordship illegitimate, but the Visconti power continued to increase with the appointment of Giovanni Visconti as archbishop of Milan, not accepted however by Pope John XXII who appointed Aicardo Antimiani of Novara. New commercial relations were established with the Republic of Venice and with the Kingdom of France. On 4 January 1318 Matteo was excommunicated and subsequently the same punishment was also inflicted on Cangrande I della Scala, lord of Verona, and Rinaldo dei Bonacolsi, lord of Mantua. Relations with the papacy remained tense and after not having appeared at the Papal court in Avignon on 16 December 1321, the pope ordered the exiled archbishop of Milan, Aicardo di Camodegia, to open a new trial for heresy against Matteo Visconti, his son Galeazzo and many relatives who had already died at the time, such as Ottone Visconti. On 30 March 1322, the Milanese were hit by the Inquisition and lost their property and rights. Matteo I Visconti, now elderly, 74 years old, retired to Crescenzago and died on 24 June 1322, leaving the government to his son Galeazzo I who was appointed lord of Milan on 10 July.

During his reign, Matteo also dedicated himself to the construction of public works. In 1316, the construction of the Loggia degli Osii in Piazza dei Mercanti was decided for the head of the Society of Justice, Scotus of San Geminiano, and the following year the church of Santa Maria dei Servi was built.

==== Galeazzo I Visconti ====
The situation in Milan, however, was still turbulent and on 8 November Galeazzo was forced to leave Milan and take refuge in Lodi after some clashes with Lodrisio Visconti, Francesco da Garbagnate and those Milanese who were seeking an agreement with the Pope. The government of Milan was entrusted to the Burgundian captain Giovanni di Chatillon, the vicar of Frederick the Fair who remained in Lombardy after the defeat of his lord. For fear of the return of the della Torre, on 12 December Galeazzo was recalled to lead the city which was now in the grip of chaos and looting. The Pope waged war on Milan together with the della Torre, managing to take Monza and declaring Galeazzo a heretic. In 1323 the papal troops were exhausted and took refuge in Monza which was besieged on 8 August by Marco Visconti. In February 1324 the papal army was defeated by the Milanese at Vaprio d'Adda. Simone della Torre dies and the commander Raimondo da Cardona is captured, then freed to be able to discuss a peace treaty with the pontiff in Piacenza. In 1325 Galeazzo dedicates himself to the construction of the Castle of Monza.

The work of unification was completed by Azzone Visconti, son of Galeazzo and nephew of Matteo, who worked to lay the foundations of a structure that would politically coordinate his domains and centralize power in the hands of the dynasty. In 1327, with the death of his father, he remained the sole heir and in opposition to the pontiff, he bought the title of vicar of Milan from Louis IV, Holy Roman Emperor. In 1332, Luchino and Giovanni Visconti, sons of Matteo I, joined the government of the new vicar in a sort of triumvirate. Lodrisio, also member of the Visconti family, who remained outside, staged a series of conspiracies in vain to depose the three; when all his accomplices were arrested by Azzone on 23 November 1332, and locked up in the prisons of Monza (called the Forni), he was forced to flee to Verona, where, as a guest of Mastino II della Scala, he wove a series of alliances, among which were the Scaligeri themselves and the Lord of Novara Calcino Tornielli, enemy of the Archbishop Giovanni. The decisive clash came on 21 February 1339 in the Battle of Parabiago, won by the triumvirs.

==== The Triumvirate ====
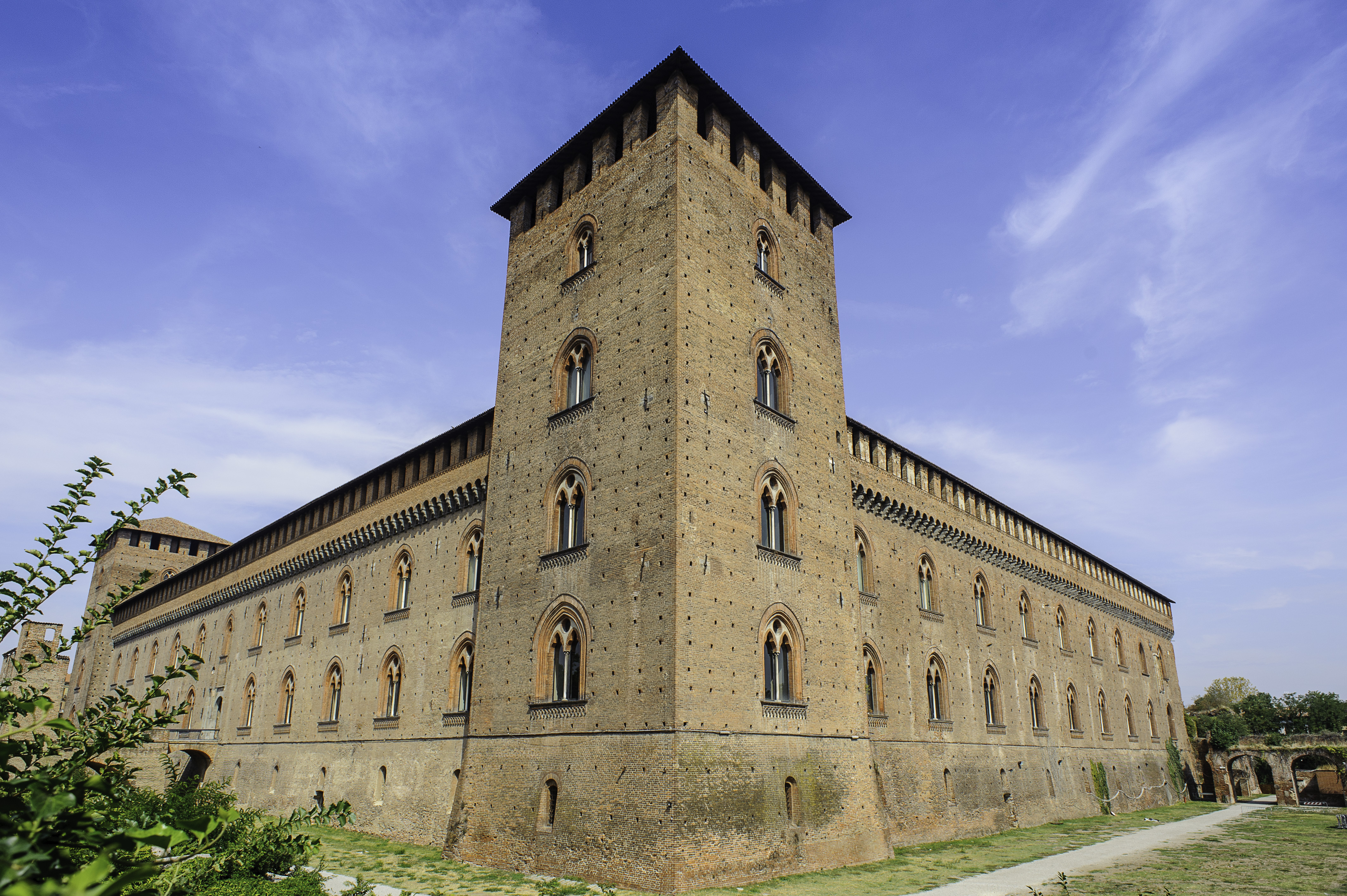
The Visconti Castle in Pavia, built by Galeazzo II

On 11 October 1354 after the death of Archbishop Giovanni Visconti, the Lordship of Milan was divided between his nephews Matteo II, Galeazzo II and Bernabò. On 17 April 1355, Giovanni Visconti, member of the Oleggio branch of the Visconti family, rebelled against the Visconti of Milan by entering Bologna and on 20 April he was proclaimed podestà. In August, following the capture of Bologna, Bernabò decided to intervene and retake the city, but without success. The triumvirate was short-lived, in fact on 26 September 1355 Matteo II Visconti died suddenly in his castle in Saronno. The lordship was divided again between Galeazzo II and Bernabò who respectively obtained the western and eastern parts of the lordship, while their sons were not recognized with any right of succession.

==== War with the Marquis of Montferrat ====
At the same time as the end of the triumvirate, on 30 October 1355 a new league was born against Milan led by the Marquis of Montferrat, who declared war on Milan on 15 December. 1355 was the year in which the Marquis John II increased his power, in fact thanks to the protection service provided to Charles IV during his travel to the Italian peninsula to be crowned Holy Roman Emperor in Rome, the Marquis obtained the imperial vicariate of Pavia on 3 June, sharing it with his cousin Otto, Duke of Brunswick-Grubenhagen.

The war began on 23 January 1356 with the occupation of Asti, but in a short time the Marquis of Montferrat also conquered Alba, Cuneo, and also took Mondovì and Chieri from the Visconti. On 10 February the podestà of Bologna Giovanni Visconti da Oleggio also came to the aid of the Marquis, who only two months earlier had reached an agreement with Bernabò to divide the power of Bologna. The response of the Visconti was not long in coming and in April Galeazzo, with the help of Pandolfo II Malatesta, laid siege to Pavia and attacked Montferrat. The siege, however, did not succeed and on 28 May following a surprise attack led by the friar Iacopo Bussolari, the army of Galeazzo II Visconti suffered a serious defeat. The Visconti were soon forced to find allies and on 27 June they formed a league with James of Piedmont who however asked the two lords of Milan to also intervene against the marquis Thomas II of Saluzzo. The territories of Mondovì, Morozzo, Cuneo and Cherasco taken from the Visconti were acquired in June 1356 by Philip II, Prince of Taranto, vicar in Piedmont of the queen of Naples, Joanna I. The war continued and in August Bernabò decided to besiege Castelleone, where however he was defeated. In the meantime Republic of Genoa rose up and restored the doge Simone Boccanegra. In the spring Bernabò was authorized by the pope to conquer Bologna, and he also tried to take Reggio Emilia and Mantua without success. Another problem for the Visconti was caused by Konrad von Landau, a military adventurer and an ally of the anti-Visconti league and head of the Great Company, who in November 1357 began to plunder the surroundings of Milan. Finally on 6 April 1358 in Milan the peace conference opened in which all the Italian states participated including the Republic of Venice and the County of Savoy. After two months of work, on 8 June 1358 in Milan in Sant'Ambrogio the peace was signed. Following the agreement Novara and Alba returned to the Visconti while Asti and Pavia remained to the Marquis of Montferrat.

==== Consolidation of Visconti rule ====
From the initial congregation of cities under the dominion of a single lord, Giovanni and Luchino, but above all Gian Galeazzo and Bernabò, through an intense activity of consolidation of their supremacy implemented with the reduction of local autonomies and the attraction into their orbit of the many small rural lordships created a sort of state structure. With Giovanni Visconti, in the mid-14th century, the first great expansion of the family's possessions took place both with the victory over the Lords of Verona, the Scaligeri, and with the submission of Republic of Genoa and Bologna; thanks to these extensions, Gian Galeazzo Visconti managed to obtain in 1395 from the Holy Roman Emperor Wenceslaus IV of Bohemia the title of duke thus putting an end to the lordship and giving rise to the Duchy of Milan.

== Lords of Milan ==
Signore	Rule		Affiliation	Podestà(s)
Martino della Torre	8 September 1259	20 November 1263	Guelph	Captain general: Oberto II Pallavicino; List: 1259: Teodorico, Pietro degli Avvocati; 1260: Patrizio da Concesa, Guandaleone da Dovera; 1261: Guglielmo Pallavicino; 1262: Ubertino Pallavicino
Filippo della Torre	20 November 1263	24 December 1265	Guelph	List: 1263: Zavatario della Strada; 1264: Oberto II Pallavicino; 1st half 1265: Federico Crotta, Tibaldo Volta, Anselmo Lavezzario, Antonio Vistarino; 2nd half 1265: Emberra del Balzo
Napoleone della Torre	24 December 1265	21 January 1277	Guelph	List: 1266: Emberra del Balzo, Guidotto da Redobio; 1267: Beltramo da Greco; 1268: Corrado Lavizario; 1269: Giovanni degli Avvocati; 1270: Giovanni Palastrello; 1271: Roberto Roberti; 1272: Visconte Visconti; 1273: Obizzo del Carretto; 1st half 1274: Guglielmo degli Avvocati; 2nd half 1274-1275: Venedico dell'Orso; 1276: Teodisio di Sanvitale, Goffredo di Langosco
Ottone Visconti	21 January 1277	8 August 1295	Ghibelline	Captain general: William VII of Montferrat (1278–81); Matteo I Visconti (1287–95); List: 1st half 1277: Ponzio degli Amati; 2nd half 1277: Aldobrandino Tangentino, Riccardo di Langosco; 1st half 1278: Alberto Fontana; 2nd half 1278: Raniero Zen; 1st half 1279: Antonio da Lomello; 2nd half 1279: Lotterio Rusconi; 1st half 1280: Gabrino da Tresseno; 2nd half 1280: Tommaso degli Avvocati, Giovanni da Lucino; 1st half 1281: Tommaso degli Avvocati, Federico Tornielli; 2nd half 1281: Uberto Beccaria; 1st half 1282: Rufino Gotoario, Galoteffio da Cesena; 2nd half 1282: Giovanni del Poggio; 1st half 1283: Uberto Beccaria; 2nd half 1283: Jacopo Sommariva; 1st half 1284: Baldovino degli Ugoni; 2nd half 1284: Guglielmo Rossi; 1st half 1285: Alberto Confalonieri; 2nd half 1285: Boezio da Lavello; 1st half 1286: Ugolino Rossi; 2nd half 1286: Pietro Rusconi; 1287: Ruffiniano Beccaria; 1st half 1288: Matteo Visconti; 2nd half 1288: Jacopo de Jacopi; 1st half 1289: Uberto Beccaria; 2nd half 1289: Baldovino degli Ugoni; 1st half 1290: Baldovino degli Ugoni, Bernardino da Polenta; 2nd half 1290: Matteo Visconti; 1st half 1291: Uberto Guasco; 2nd half 1291: Niccolò Merlano; 1st half 1292: Antonio Gallizi; 2nd half 1292: Rolando Scotti; 1293: Amighetto da Martinengo; 1st half 1294: Matteo de Maggi; 2nd half 1294: Zaccaria Salimbeni; 1295: Enrico Tangentino
Matteo I Visconti	8 August 1295	June 1302	Ghibelline	List: 1296: Zanazio Salimbene; 1st half 1297: Corrado Gambara; 2nd half 1297: Fulcieri di Calboli; 1st half 1298: Tommaso Rangoni; 2nd half 1298: Jacopo del Cassero; 1st half 1299: Bisaccia Riccardi; 2nd half 1299: Federico Sommariva; 1st half 1300: Guelfo Filodoni; 2nd half 1300: Federico Sommariva; 1301: Bracco Guinizelli; 1302: Bernardino da Polenta
Guido della Torre	June 1302	6 January 1311	Guelph	List: 1303: Antonio Fissiraga; 1st half 1304: Anselmo da Palestro; 2nd half 1304 – 1st half 1305: Federico Ponzoni; 2nd half 1305: Riccardo Langosco; 1st half 1306: Francesco degli Avvocati; 2nd half 1306: Guido dei Roberti; 1st half 1307: Arnolfo Fissiraga; 2nd half 1307: Jacopo Cavalcabò; 1308: Matteo del Pallio; 1309: Tignacca Paravicino; 1310: Ghislerio
Matteo I Visconti	6 January 1311	24 June 1322	Ghibelline	List: 1311-March 1312: Ugolino da Sesso; March 1312-April 1312: Ziliolo Allegri; April 1312-September 1312: Azzone Malaspina; September 1312-January 1314: Giannazzo Salimbene; January 1314 – July 1314: Guidone Pignoli; July 1314 – October 1314: Scoto di San Gimignano; October 1314 – April 1315: Spinetta Malaspina; April 1315 – October 1316: Giacomo da Peschiera; October 1315 – January 1316: Ruggero Servadei; May 1316 – November 1316: Jacopino da Cornazzano; November 1316 – June 1317: Bonifacio da Alice; June 1317 – December 1317: Gualtieri di Corte; December 1317: Azorino Malaspina; 1318: Enrico dei Petrioli; 1319: Bonifacio da Cavriago; 1320: Paolo Aldigheri; 1321: Giacomino da Iseo; March 1322 – October 1322: Lanfranco Cavalazzi
Galeazzo I Visconti	24 June 1322	6 August 1328	Ghibelline	List: October 1322: Giovanni Lanfranchi; November 1322 – December 1322: Ravizza Rusconi; January 1323 – February 1323: Alessandro da Bologna; February 1323 – September 1323: Calzino Tornielli; September 1323 – December 1323: Giacomo Rusconi; 1324 – June 1325: Viscontello da Binasco; June 1325 – October 1325: Ottorino Mostardi; October 1325 – July 1326: Beccario Beccaria; July 1326 – December 1326: Gorzera Bonaccorsi; 1327–1328: Gozio di Guiderchusen
Azzone Visconti	6 August 1328	16 August 1339	Ghibelline	List: 1329-April 1330: Guiscardo Lancia; April 1330 – December 1330: Ugolino da Lucino; 1331: Lanfranco Cavalazzi; 1st half 1332: Lanfranco Tentone; 2nd half 1332: Zanotto Fieschi; 1333: Giovanni del Mangano; 1334: Mirano Beccaria; December 1334 – May 1338: Orso Giustiniani; May 1338 – May 1339: Isnardo Colleoni
Luchino Visconti	16 August 1339	24 January 1349	Ghibelline	List: May 1339 – June 1340: Giovanni Besacci; June 1340 – July 1341: Francesco Malaspina; July 1341 – July 1342: Alberto Rusconi; July 1342 – 13??: Goffredo da Sesso
Giovanni Visconti	16 August 1339	5 October 1354	Ghibelline	List: May 1339 – June 1340: Giovanni Besacci; June 1340 – July 1341: Francesco Malaspina; July 1341 – July 1342: Alberto Rusconi; July 1342 – 13??: Goffredo da Sesso
Matteo II Visconti	5 October 1354	29 September 1355	Ghibelline	List: 1356: Lotario Rusconi; 1362: Bernardino Bolghero; 1372: Giberto da Correggio; 1373: Lotario Rusconi; 1385: Carlo Zen
Galeazzo II Visconti	5 October 1354	4 August 1378	Ghibelline	List: 1356: Lotario Rusconi; 1362: Bernardino Bolghero; 1372: Giberto da Correggio; 1373: Lotario Rusconi; 1385: Carlo Zen
Bernabò Visconti	5 October 1354	6 May 1385	Ghibelline	List: 1356: Lotario Rusconi; 1362: Bernardino Bolghero; 1372: Giberto da Correggio; 1373: Lotario Rusconi; 1385: Carlo Zen
Gian Galeazzo Visconti	6 May 1385	5 September 1395	Ghibelline	List: 1390: Prandeparte Pico della Mirandola; May 1392 – May 1393: Giberto da Correggio; May 1393 – June 1394: Enrico Rivola; June 1394 – March 1396: Spinetta Spinola

== History of the coats of arms ==
Coat of arms

1259–1274
(Under the Della Torre dynasty)

1274–1277
(Under the Della Torre)

1277–1395
(Under the Visconti dynasty)
