= Ludovico I Gonzaga =

Italian noble founder of the House of Gonzaga (1268–1360)

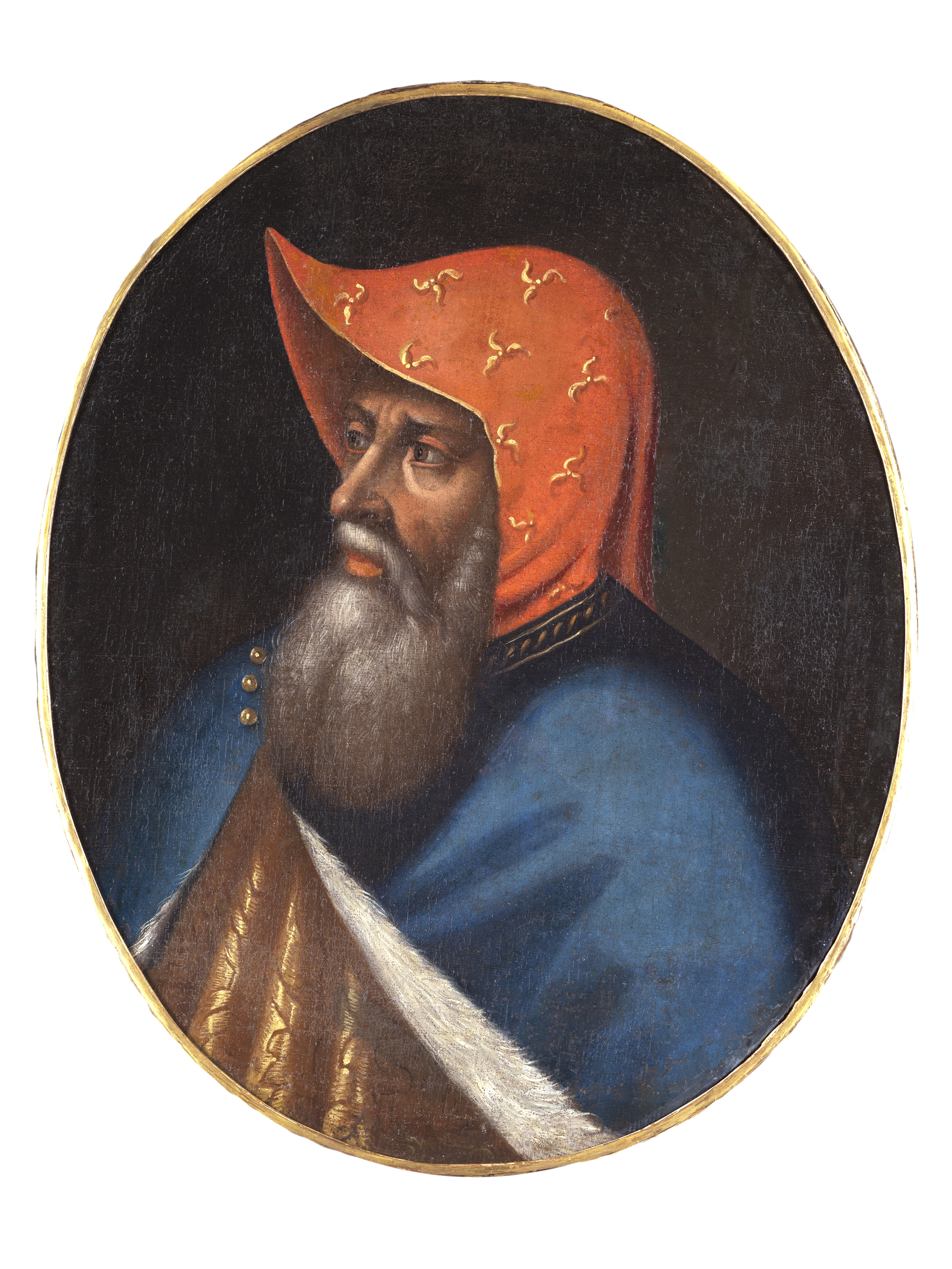
- Successor: Guido Gonzaga
- Born: 1268
- Died: 18 January 1360 (aged 91–92)
- Noble family: House of Gonzaga (founder)
- Spouses: Caterina Malatesta; Richalda Lamberti; Giovanna Novelle Gonzaga
- Issue: Guido Gonzaga; Feltrino Gonzaga; Corrado Gonzaga
- Father: Guido Corradi

Ludovico I Gonzaga (1268 – 18 January 1360) was an Italian lord, the founder of the Gonzaga family who was the first capitano del popolo of Mantua and imperial vicar.

== Biography ==
Born in Mantua, he was the son of Guido Corradi and the grandson of Antonio Corradi. On 16 August 1328, with the help of Ghibelline troops from Cangrande I della Scala and his father-in-law Guglielmo Azzone Panebarco, he ousted Rinaldo Bonacolsi from Mantua, replacing him as capitano generale., and on 28 August he was elected capitano del popolo ("Captain of the People") by the inhabitants. The following year Louis IV appointed him as imperial vicar and in 1335 he became also lord of Reggio Emilia.

In 1339, he supported Luchino, Giovanni and Azzone Visconti against Mastino II della Scala and Lodrisio Visconti, sending troops that helped the former to win the Battle of Parabiago. In 1342 he helped Pisa stand the Florentine assault.

In 1349 Ludovico housed poet Francesco Petrarca, who visited Vergil's tomb in Mantua. In his late years he fought against Bernabò Visconti. He died at Mantua in 1360 and was buried in the city cathedral.

He was succeeded in Mantua by his son Guido, while his other son Feltrino held Reggio Emilia.

== Marriages and issue ==
He was married to:

Richilda Ramberti

- Tommasina (d. 1372), married Guglielmo Azzone Castelbarco.
- Guido Gonzaga (1290- =) married to Agnese Gonzaga, married secondly to Camilla Beccaria and thirdly to Beatrix de Bar
- Fillipino Gonzaga (1300-1356) married to Anna Dovara and secondly to Verena Habsburg-Laufenburg
- Feltrino Gonzaga (1305-1374)
- Francesca Gonzaga

with Caterina Malatesta

- Corrago Gonzaga married Verde Beccaria
- Luigia Gonzaga married Nicola Fiesch
- Federigo Gonzaga

with Giovanna Novelle Gonzaga

- Tommasina Gonzga married to Alidosio Alidosi, Todeschino
- Orietta Gonzaga
- Giovanni Gonzaga
- Azzo Gonzaga

Ludovico also had by unknown mothers

- Costanza
- Bartolomeo
- Costanza
