= Feltrino Gonzaga =

Feltrino Gonzaga (c. 1330 – 28 December 1374) was an Italian condottiero, a member of the Gonzaga family.

== Biography ==
He was the son of Ludovico I Gonzaga, the first capitano del popolo of Mantua, where Feltrino was born.

In 1335 his troops conquered Reggio Emilia, which he would abandon only in 1371. Here he built a citadel, destroyed in 1850. In 1345 he was unsuccessfully besieged by Mastino I della Scala. In 1363, leading an anti-Visconti coalition, he won a battle at Solara. He signed a treaty of peace with Bernabò Visconti in 1364, and in 1366 he was appointed as imperial vicar in Reggio by emperor Charles IV. In 1370 and again 1371 the Visconti besieged him in Reggio, and Feltrino was forced to sell Reggio to Barnabò Visconti for 50,000 golden florins.

However, he maintained the county of Novellara and Bagnolo, which was ruled by a Gonzaga cadet branch until 1728.

He died in Padua in 1374.

== Family ==
In 1328 he married Antonia da Correggio, daughter of Guido IV of Parma and Correggio. Their children were:

- Guido (+1399), lord of Novellara. He married Ginevra Malatesta, daughter of Malatesta III lord of Rimini. Their son was Giacomo (+1441) lord of Novellara
- Guglielmo (+ after 1356); his descendants were conti di Thiene.

He married secondly Catherine Visconti, daughter of his cousin Egidiola Gonzaga and Matteo II Visconti. From this marriage there was no issue.
