= San Francesco, Mantua =

Roman Catholic church in Mantua, Italy

Coordinates: 45.159766°N 10.787865°E

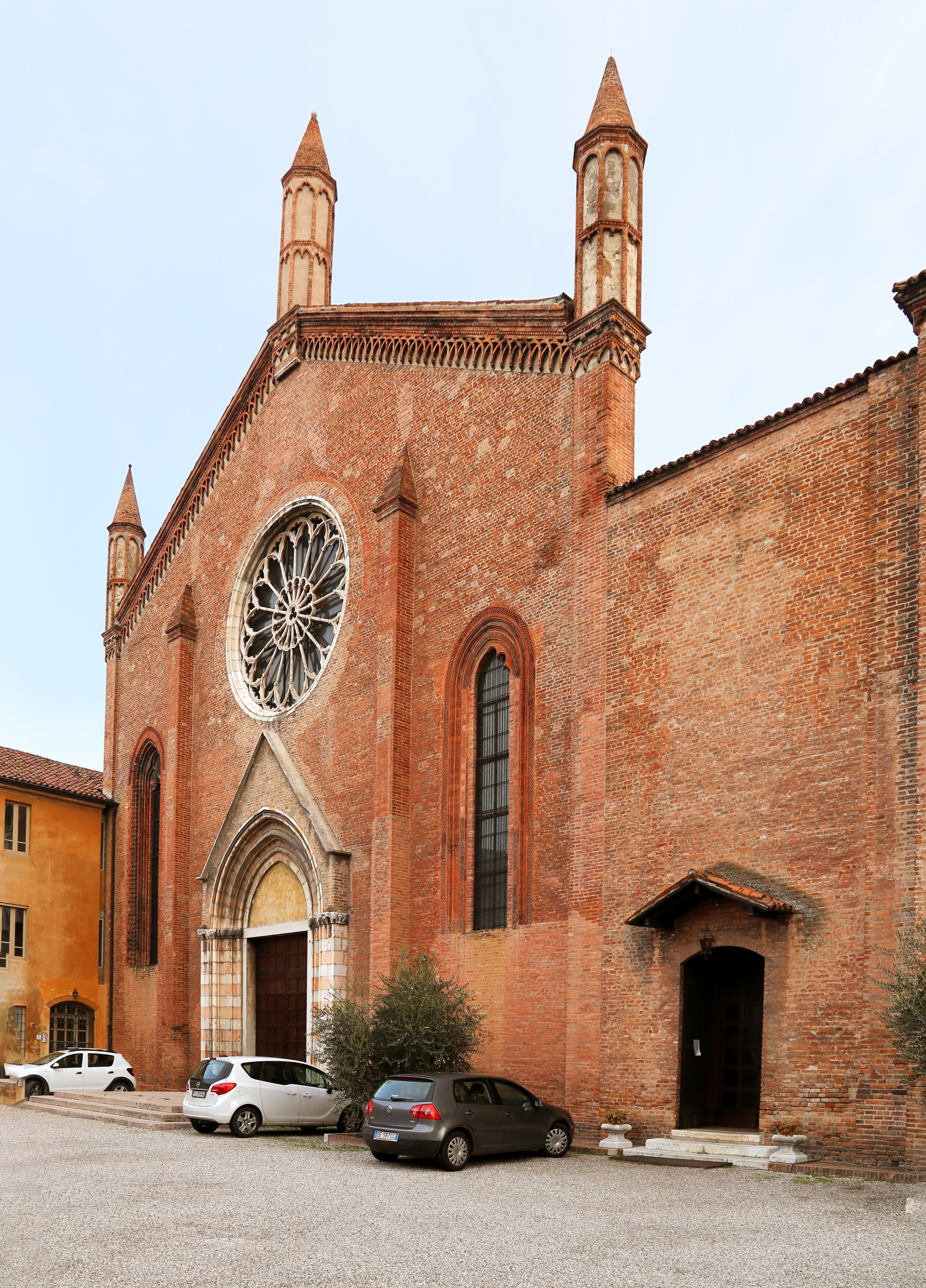
San Francesco, Mantua

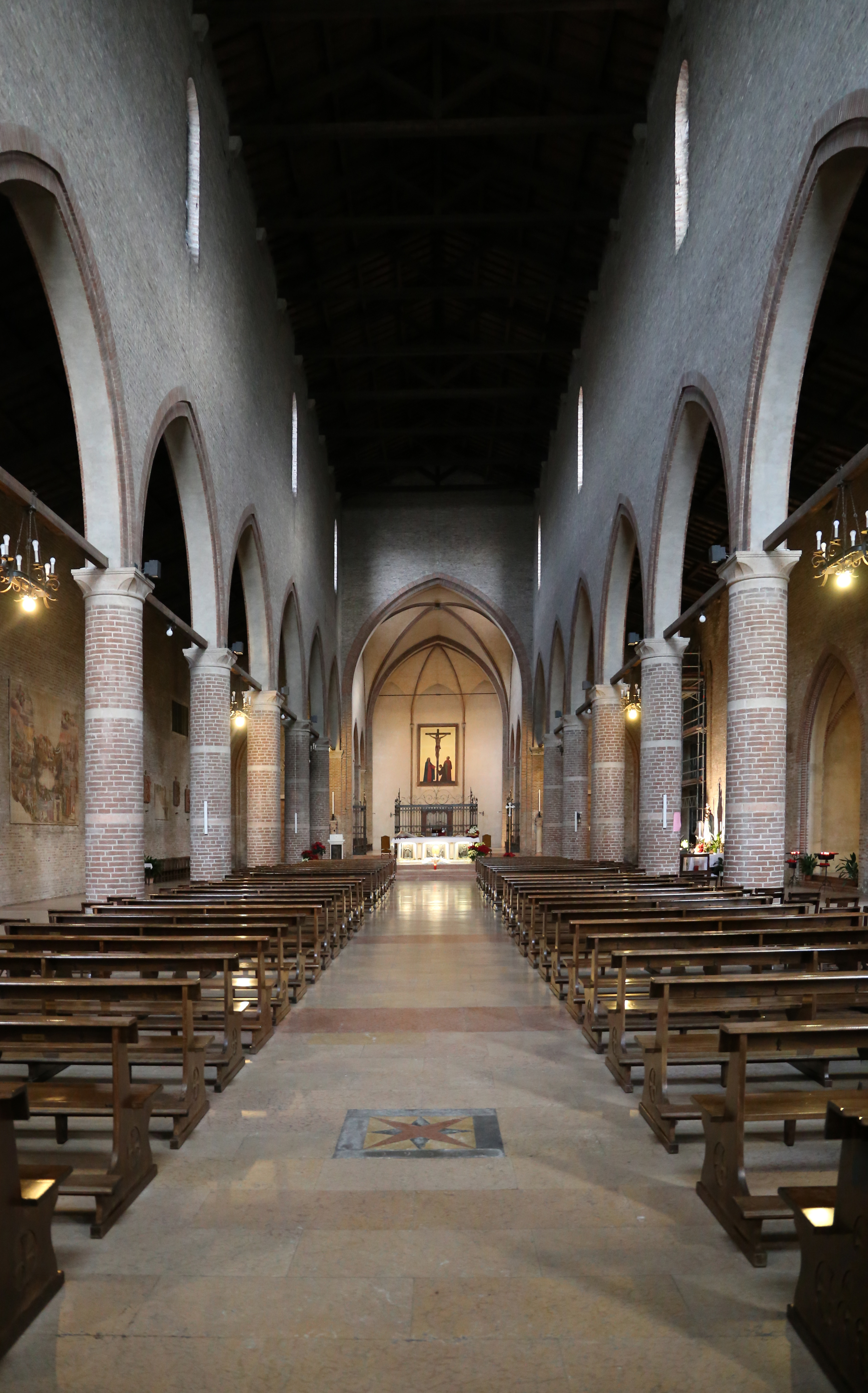
Interno

The Chiesa di San Francesco (Italian, "Church of St. Francis" ) is a Roman Catholic church located in the historic center of Mantua, Italy, at Piazza San Francesco d'Assisi 5.

The church was founded by the Franciscan Order in 1304 but it was not consecrated until 1459, when Pope Pius II performed the ceremony. Suppressed in 1782, it was sacked in 1797, during the Napoleonic Wars, and turned into an arsenal in 1811. Still in military use when World War II began, it was devastated by bombardment during the war. The Cappella Gonzaga, with its frescoes depicting the life of St. Louis of Toulouse ( Italian: San Ludovico d'Angiò ), was saved and recently restored. These frescoes were supposed to have been painted by Serafino de' Serafini, an artist who was active in Modena during the 14th Century. The church was reconstructed in Romanesque and Gothic styles. Now visible are some of the original frescoes depicting St. Francis Receives the Stigmata by Stefano da Verona. Andrea Mantegna's work St. Bernardino of Siena between Two Angels was originally here but it is now at the Pinacoteca di Brera in Milan, Italy.

In the Cappella Gonzaga, built between 1369 and 1484, were buried:

- Guido Gonzaga, 2nd capitano del popolo of Mantua.
- Ludovico II Gonzaga, 3rd capitano del popolo of Mantua.
- Francesco I Gonzaga, 4th capitano del popolo of Mantua.
- Margherita Malatesta, second wife of Francesco I Gonzaga.
- Gianfrancesco Gonzaga, 5th capitano del popolo of Mantua.
- Rodolfo Gonzaga, son of Ludovico III, 2nd Marquis of Mantua.
- Francesco Cardinal Gonzaga, son of Ludovico III, 2nd Marquis of Mantua.

Also at the church were buried other notables:

- Giovanni dalle Bande Nere, the condottiero, buried in full armor in 1526.
- Blessed Alberto Gonzaga in 1321.
- Guido Torelli, the founder of the noble family of Torelli, in 1449.
- Cristoforo I Torelli, son of Guido, in 1460.
- Francesco Secco, the condottiero who owned the family chapel, in 1496.

== See also ==
- Category:Burials at San Francesco, Mantua

== Sources ==
- (in English) Touring Club of Italy, Mantua and its Province : Art Treasures, Nature Parks, Traditions and Local Products, with Detailed Road and Town Maps ( Milan : Touring Club Italiano, 2006 ), page 54
