= Ugolino Gonzaga =

Ugolino Gonzaga (1320 – 13 October 1362) was an Italian condottiero, a member of the House of Gonzaga.

== Biography ==
Born in Mantua, he was the son of Guido Gonzaga, second Capitano del Popolo of the city, and of Beatrice of Bar. In 1360 he governed Mantua alongside his father and his brothers Francesco and Ludovico.

In 1340 he married Verde della Scala, daughter of Mastino II, but she died two years later; Ugolino then married to Emilia della Gherardesca. After the latter's death in 1349, he remarried to Caterina Visconti, daughter of Matteo II Visconti and niece of Barnabò Visconti. The alliance that this marriage brought with the Visconti lasted until the early 16th century, and saw the Gonzaga warring in Tuscany against the Scaligers in 1342-1343 alongside the Milanese.

However, the alliance between the Gonzaga and the Visconti was not liked by the Republic of Venice, which set up a plot leading to Ugolino's assassination in 1362 by his brothers Francesco and Ludovico, with the support of the Castelbarco noble family.

== See also ==
- Feltrino Gonzaga

== Sources ==
- Coniglio, Giuseppe (1973). I Gonzaga. Varese.
