= Visconti Castle (Monza) =

Demolished medieval castle in Monza, Lombardy, Italy

- Castello Visconteo di Monza
- Monza, Lombardy, Northern Italy
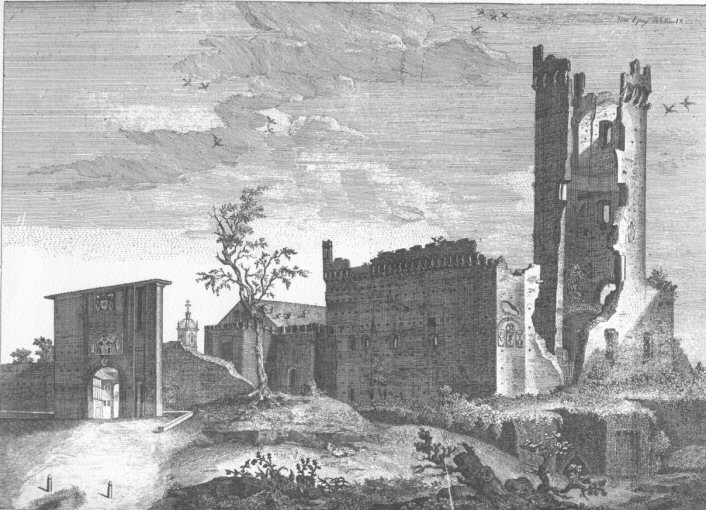
- The ruin of the castle in a 19th-century illustration

Site information
- Type: Medieval castle
- Condition: demolished, only one tower survives (‘Torre del Lambro’)

Location
- Coordinates: 45°34′49″N 9°16′28″E
- Height: about 30 metres (98 ft) (‘Torre dei Forni’)
- Length: 140 metres (460 ft) (west-east), 110 metres (360 ft) (north-south)

Site history
- Built: 14th century
- Built by: Galeazzo I Visconti, Galeazzo II Visconti
- Events: Death of Caterina Visconti, duchess of Milan (1404)

The Visconti Castle of Monza was a medieval castle in Monza, Lombardy, northern Italy. Its construction was initiated at the behest of Galeazzo I Visconti in the 14th century. In 1527, a revolt by the citizens of Monza demolished its tallest tower ('Torre dei Forni'), marking the beginning of the castle's destruction. Today, only a small tower on the Lambro River survives, along with the remains of a drawbridge.

== History ==
=== Visconti period (14th and 15th centuries) ===
The castle stood on high ground above the bank of the Lambro River. In 1325, the position of the land induced Galeazzo I Visconti, lord of Milan, to build the first fortification consisting of a small fortress dominated by a high tower to control the road to Milan. In 1357, Galeazzo II Visconti expanded the fortification towards the east and north, reaching the perimeter of the village walls previously built by Azzone Visconti. The previous fortification became the core (Rocchetta) of the new castle.

The castle had a quadrangular shape that extended 140 metres (460 ft) from today's Largo Mazzini to the Lambro and a width of approximately 110 metres (360 ft). It was defended from the east by the Lambro and from the other side by a moat about 13 metres (43 ft) wide fed by the Lambro's waters. A further moat, approximately 6 metres (20 ft) wide, internally separated the Rocchetta from the rest of the castle.

The entrance to the Rocchetta, located in the southwest corner of the castle, had a drawbridge that stretched over the internal moat. Inside the fortress, a courtyard, bordered on four sides by buildings, was dominated towards the south by the main tower, known as the 'Torre dei Forni.' This rectangular tower measured approximately 15 metres (49 ft) by 13 m (43 ft) and was about 30 m (98 ft) high. To the east of the Rocchetta, the internal courtyard ('Piazza d'Armi') was 115 metres (377 ft) by 70 m (230 ft) vast. A residential building (the 'Cascinazza') occupied the part of the castle area north of the Rocchetta and the Piazza d'Armi. Other towers surrounded the castle. Two were on the eastern side, overlooking the Lambro: the 'Torre Manganella' and 'Torre dei Molini'. Another tower with a drawbridge, the only one that survives today, was along the Lambro's course.

Gian Galeazzo Visconti, the first Duke of Milan, donated the castle to his wife, Caterina Visconti, in 1380. Gian Galeazzo's death in 1402 destabilized the Visconti state, to which Monza belonged. In 1404, Caterina Visconti, who had become regent of the Duchy of Milan while waiting for her son Giovanni Maria to come of age, decided to take refuge in the castle of Monza. Here, however, she was taken prisoner by a faction pursuing the Duchy dismemberment. Probably poisoned, she died a few weeks later in the castle.

=== Demolitions and new constructions in the modern era ===
The castle began to be demolished at the beginning of the 16th century. A document from 1590, based on various testimonies, reports that two towers, one above the main gate and the other facing the Lambro, had been partially ruined to sell the construction material.

From 1814 to 1820, the family of Count Ercole Durini built a villa in the area occupied by the castle, designed by the architect Amati. To the north of Villa Durini, some castle structures, including the western portion of the Cascinazza, survived.

In the 1970s, La Rinascente purchased Villa Durini to use as its headquarters. Further constructions gave rise to the current building, which has a façade facing Via Italia and Largo Mazzini.

== The surviving remains of the castle today ==
Only small remnants of the extensive Visconti castle structures survive today. Only the Lambro tower, located north of the Via Azzone Visconti bridge, is visible outside.

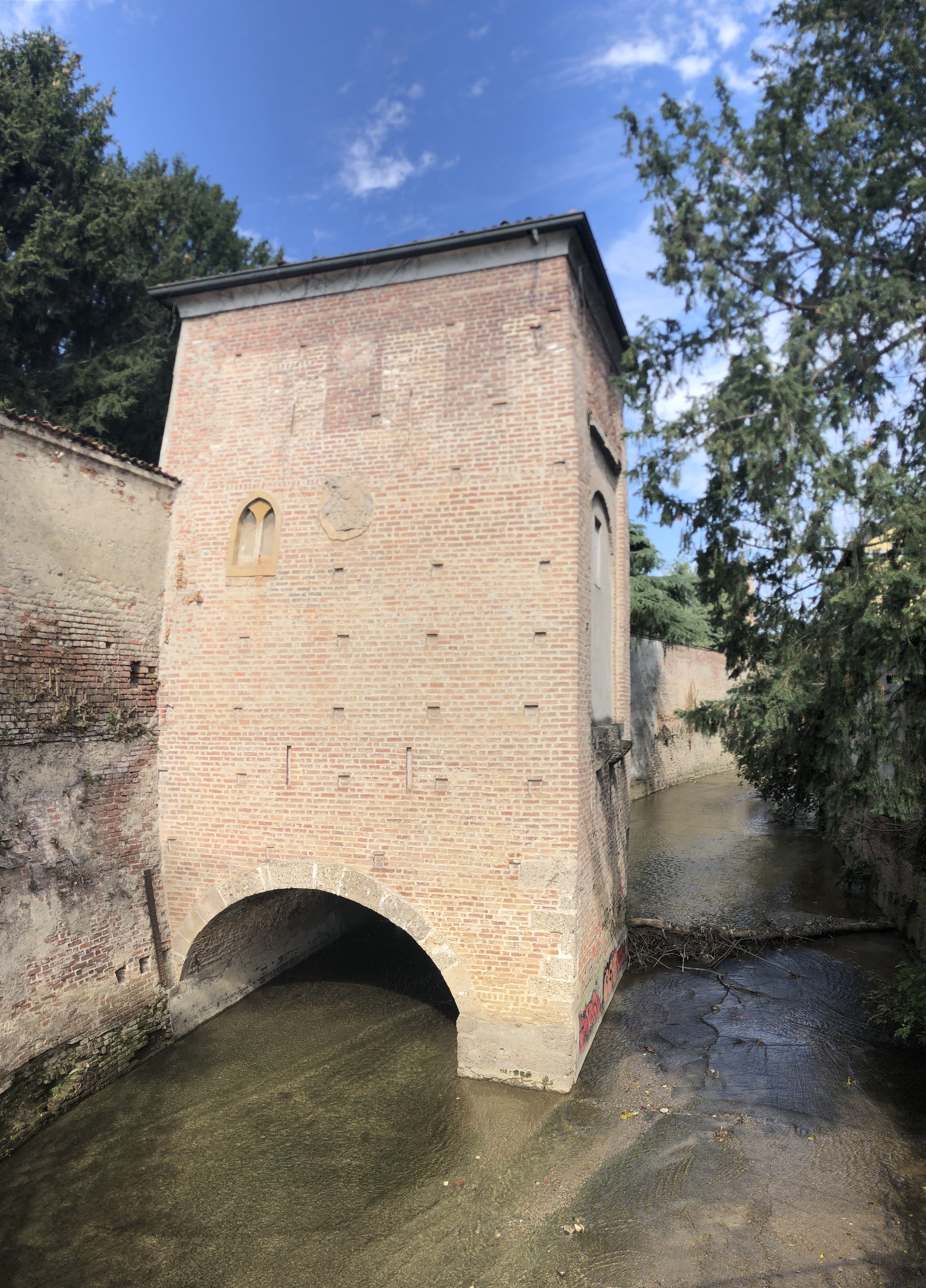
The tower on the Lambro, the only castle remnant visible today

A stretch of the castle's eastern defensive curtain still exists along the river downstream of the tower. The remains of the imposing foundations of the southern-western portion of the Cascinazza are partially visible inside the basement of the Rinascente palace.

== Sources ==
- Black, Jane (2009). Absolutism in Renaissance Milan. Plenitude of power under the Visconti and the Sforza 1329–1535. Oxford: Oxford University Press. ISBN 9780199565290. OCLC 1007134403.
- Conti, Flavio; Hybsch, Vincenzo; Vincenti, Antonello (1990). I castelli della Lombardia. Provincie di Milano e Pavia (in Italian). Novara: Istituto Geografico de Agostini. ISBN 9788840291086. OCLC 635639773.
- Frisi, Antonio Francesco (1794). Memorie storiche di Monza e sua corte raccolte ed esaminate dal canonico Anton-Francesco Frisi (in Italian). Vol. I. Milano: Gaetano Motta. OCLC 679376925.
- Pruneri, Stefano (2019). Monza. Dal castello Visconteo al palazzo della Rinascente (in Italian) (2nd ed.). Villa di Tirano: Tipografia Poletti s.n.c. ISBN 9791220045971.
- Zerbi, Luigi (1892). "Il castello di Monza e i suoi forni. Parte prima. Da Galeazzo Primo Visconti alla caduta della Repubblica Ambrosiana". Archivio Storico Lombardo. Serie Seconda. IX: 29–80.
