= Ludovico I =

Ludovico I may refer to:

- Ludovico I Gonzaga (1268–1360), better known as Luigi, the first Capitano del Popolo ('Captain of the People') of Mantua and Imperial Vicar
- Ludovico I of Saluzzo (died in 1475)

== See also ==
- Ludovico II
- Ludwig I
