= Ludovico II =

Ludovico II may refer to:

- Ludovico II Gonzaga, capitano del popolo of Mantua (1334–1382)
- Ludovico II Gonzaga, Marquis of Mantua (1412–1478)
- Ludovico II of Saluzzo (1438–1504)

== See also ==
- Ludovico I (disambiguation)
