= Uguccione Borromeo =

Most Reverend Uguccione Borromeo
- Bishop of Novara
- Church: Catholic Church
- Diocese: Roman Catholic Diocese of Novara
- In office: 1304–1329
- Predecessor: Bartolomeo Querini
- Successor: Giovanni Visconti

Personal details
- Died: 1329 Novara, Italy

Uguccione Borromeo (died 1329) was a Roman Catholic prelate who served as Bishop of Novara (1304–1329).

== Biography ==
On 19 February 1304, Uguccione Borromeo was appointed during the papacy of Pope Benedict XI as Bishop of Novara. He served as Bishop of Novara until his death in 1329.

While bishop, he was the principal consecrator of Castone Torriani, Archbishop of Milan (1308).

== External links and additional sources ==
- Cheney, David M. "Diocese of Novara". Catholic-Hierarchy.org. (for Chronology of Bishops) ^{[self-published]}
- Chow, Gabriel. "Diocese of Novara (Italy)". GCatholic.org. (for Chronology of Bishops) ^{[self-published]}

Catholic Church titles
Preceded by Bartolomeo Querini	Bishop of Novara; 1304–1329	Succeeded by Giovanni Visconti
