= San Gottardo, Milan =

Church in Milan, Italy

Coordinates: 45°27′46″N 9°11′32″E

Church of Saint Gotthard of Hildesheim (Chiesa di San Gottardo in Corte)
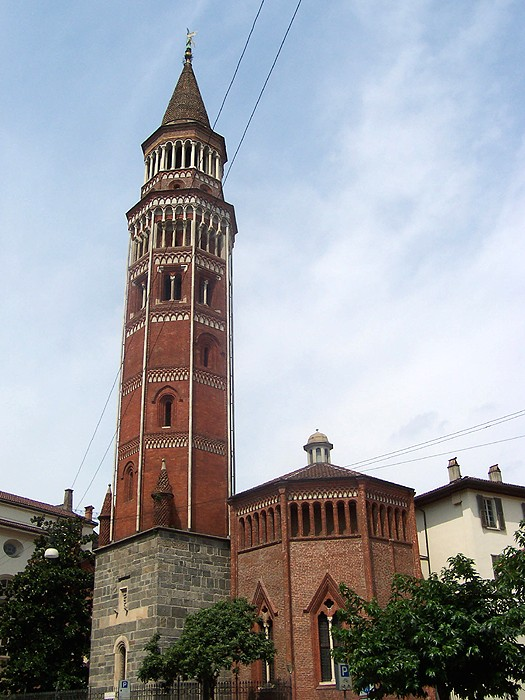
- The Bell tower.

Religion
- Affiliation: Roman Catholic
- Province: Milan
- Status: Active

Location
- Location: Milan, Italy
- Interactive map of Church of Saint Gotthard of Hildesheim (Chiesa di San Gottardo in Corte)

Architecture
- Architect: Francesco Pecorari
- Type: Church
- Style: Lombard Gothic; Baroque; Neoclassical
- Groundbreaking: 1330
- Completed: 1336

San Gottardo in Corte or San Gottardo a Palazzo is a church in Milan, northern Italy.

It was built as Ducal Chapel by Azzone Visconti in 1330, and finished in 1336, as indicated by an inscription on the walls. It was originally dedicated to the Blessed Virgin but Azzone, who had gout, later changed the dedication to St. Gotthard of Hildesheim, patron of those with gout. The design was by Francesco Pecorari from Cremona.

The octagonal bell tower has the first example of public clock (before, sun-dials were used).

The interior was restored in the Neoclassicist era by Giocondo Albertolli. Of the original church, part of the Giottesque Crucifixion, a canvas with St. Charles Borromeo by Giovan Battista Crespi and the tomb of Azzone Visconti remain.
