= Roberto Visconti =

Italian Roman Catholic archbishop

- Archbishop of Milan
- Archdiocese: Milan
- In office: 1354–1361
- Predecessor: Giovanni II Visconti
- Successor: Guglielmo II della Pusterla
- Previous posts: Provost of Brivio; Archpriest of the Metropolitan Church of Milan

Personal details
- Born: Pogliano Milanese
- Died: 8 August 1361 Milan
- Denomination: Roman Catholic
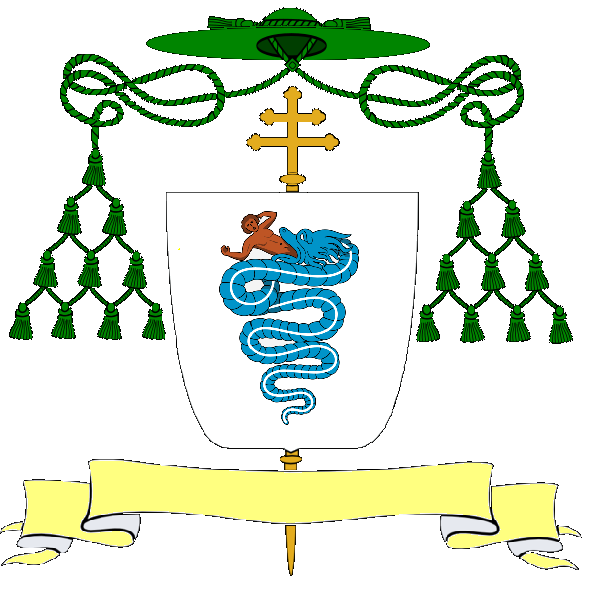
- Coat of arms

Roberto Visconti (died 8 August 1361) was an Italian Roman Catholic archbishop.

== Biography ==
A member of a collateral branch of the Visconti family that ruled Milan, Roberto was born in Pogliano Milanese and enjoyed the title of Lord of Valtravaglia. He was also related to Giovanni II Visconti, and already held a few benefices such as the Provost of Brivio and as the Archpriest of the Metropolitan Church of Milan.

On 29 October 1354, Roberto Visconti was appointed archbishop of Milan. On 5 January 1355, he crowned Emperor Charles IV in St. Ambrose Basilica with the Iron Crown of Lombardy, although other sources claim that Patriarch of Aquileia or the Bishop of Bergamo crowned the Emperor, since Roberto was not consecrated until April 1355.

On 5 December 1355, Roberto Visconti laid the foundation stone of the foundation of the Church of San Giovanni that restored the Basilica di Santa Tecla.

The political power of his Visconti cousins, who ruled the Milan, complicated Roberto's life. Usually, there were only minor conflicts, but in 1360, Pope Innocent VI excommunicated Bernabò Visconti. The latter reputedly uttered the following Latin phrase against the Archbishop of Milan one day when he had refused to carry out Bernabò's orders, due to the excommunication:

Latin: Nescis, pultrone, quod ego sum papa et imperator ac dominus in omnibus terris meis, et quod nec imperatore, immodo nec Deus, posset in terris meis facere nisi quod vellem nec intendo quod faciat?

English: Do you not know, oh sluggard, that I am the pope and emperor and lord in all of my land, and neither the emperor nor God can refuse to do what I want on my land?

— Bernabò Visconti

Roberto Visconti died on 8 August 1361 in Milan, but according to other sources would have died in his castle in Legnano.

== Coat-of-arms ==
Image
Blazon
Giovanni III Visconti
Archbishop of Milan

Silver to blue snake swaying on the pole and crowned with gold, swallowing a dark complexion (Visconti). The shield, attached to a patriarchal gold processional cross, placed on the pole, is stamped by a hat with cords and green tassels. The tassels, twelve in number, are arranged ten on each side, in five orders of 1, 2, 3, 4.
