= Saint Ambrose faith =

Former political entity in Milan, Italy

Coat of arms of Milan

Saint Ambrose faith (Latin: Credentia Sancti Ambrosii Mediolani; Lombard: Cardenza de Sant Ambroeus; Italian: Credenza di Sant'Ambrogio) was an assembly of the free commune of Milan and, later, of the Lordship of Milan, named after its patron saint.

Founded in 1198 to represent the popolo minuto (the working classes), its first head was Drudo Marcellino, who was also podestà in 1201 and 1212 and city magistrate in 1205. In 1240, Pagano della Torre was elected to this position, followed in 1247 by his nephew Martino.

The assembly was disbanded between 1279 and 1299, and soon substituted by a homonymous military body, in turn disbanded within 10 years.
