= Saint Bernardino of Siena Between Two Angels =

1460 painting by Andrea Mantegna

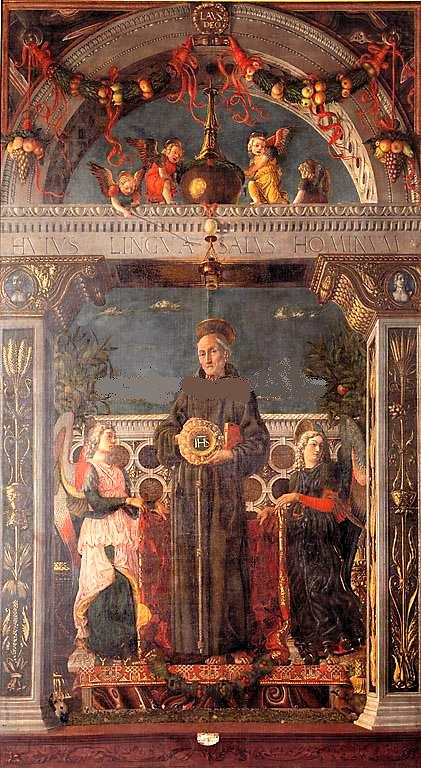
- Artist: Andrea Mantegna
- Year: 1460
- Medium: Tempera on canvas
- Dimensions: 385 cm × 220 cm (152 in × 87 in)
- Location: Pinacoteca di Brera; Milan

Saint Bernardino of Siena Between Two Angels is a painting attributed to the Italian Renaissance artist Andrea Mantegna and his assistants, dated to 1460 and housed in the Pinacoteca di Brera of Milan.

The painting was located in the funerary chapel of marquis Ludovico III Gonzaga, dedicated to Saint Bernardino and situated in church of San Francesco in Mantua. It was acquired by the Milanese gallery in 1811.

== Description ==
The painting portrays the saint in a central position. He holds the IHS monogram (referring to the name of Jesus) on a gold plate, which he usually displayed at the end of his sermons. He stands on a platform covered with an oriental carpet. At his sides are two angels, and, above the architrave over his head, are four sitting or kneeling cherubs.

The architrave carries the inscription "Huius lingua salus hominum", meaning "His word is the safety of men". The arch is decorated with festoons with flowers and fruit, a typical element of Mantegna's paintings in Padua, influenced by Francesco Squarcione. The basement has a cartouche with the date 1460 (according to others, 1468 or 1469).

It is currently disputed if the painting was executed by Mantegna and his assistants, or by the latter alone.
