= Isabella Fieschi =

Isabella Fieschi (floruit 1356), was a lady of Milan by marriage to Luchino Visconti, lord of Milan.

== Life ==
She was the daughter of the Genuese noble Carlo Fieschi, count of Savignone, while mother was Teodora of Bourbon allegedly a relative of Charles II of Naples.

Isabellas other important family connections included being a great-niece (through her father) of the pope Adrian V.Isabella was also a maternal cousin of Beatrice d’Este, the widow of Galeazzo I Visconti and mother of Azzone the ruling lord of Milan.

Marriage

The marriage was arranged as an alliance between Genoa and Milan, and the ceremony took place in Milan in 1331. Isabellas husband had been married twice before and was also much older than her. While Luchino had no legitimate children he had fathered several illegitimate sons.

As Azzone, her husband Luchinos nephew was the lord of Milan, Isabella only became Lady of Milan on her husbands assuming the title after Azzones death in 1339.

Isabella was known for her beauty and her love life, and reportedly had several lovers. In 1347, she made an official visit to Venice. During her visit, she participated in an orgy during which she had sexual intercourse with three men at the same time, among them being Andrea Dandolo, the Doge of Venice, and the nephew of her spouse, Galeazzo II Visconti. When her husband eventually found out about this, he swore to punish her cruelly. When he died shortly thereafter, he was rumoured to have been poisoned by Isabella in self-defence.

After the death of Visconti, Isabella was forced to give up her son's rights to power in Milan and was placed under house arrest. In 1356, Isabella managed to escape from Milan. Reportedly, she returned to her family in Savignone.

== Issue ==
Orsina (b. 1343-?) married to Balzarino Pusterla

Luca (b.4 August 1346 -1399)also known as Luchino Novello or "Luchinetto", married first an unknown woman, and married secondly to Maddalena Strozzi

Giovanni (b.4 August 1346 -?)

| Preceded by Catherine of Savoy-Vaud | Lady of Milan; 1339–1349 | Succeeded by Violante of Saluzzo |
