= Guido Gonzaga =

- Lord of Mantua
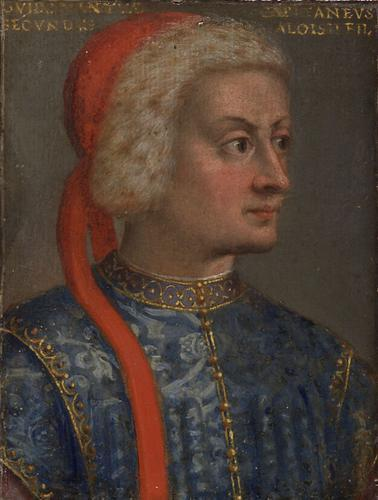
- Predecessor: Ludovico I Gonzaga
- Successor: Ludovico II Gonzaga
- Noble family: House of Gonzaga
- Spouses: Agnese Pico della Miralonda; Camilla Beccaria; Beatrice of Bar
- Issue: Ludovico II Gonzaga
- Father: Ludovico I Gonzaga
- Mother: Richalda Lamberti

Guido Gonzaga (1290 – 22 September 1369) was an Italian condottiero, son of Ludovico I Gonzaga capitano del popolo of Mantua and imperial vicar.

== Biography ==
Guido was the son of Ludovico I Gonzaga, captain-general of Mantua, and Richilda Ramberti. He was elected podestà of Mantua in 1328, as well as of Reggio Emilia. In 1335 he became lord of the latter city.

In 1360 he became the second capitano del popolo in Mantua. He was appointed to that position at the old age of 70, together with his son Ugolino, who most likely held the effective power until his assassination (14 October 1362) by the brothers Francesco and Ludovico.

He was in power in 1368 when Mantua was occupied by Barnabò Visconti, although the city was freed through the intervention of emperor Charles IV. With the peace of Bologna, Mantua obtained the lands of Cavriana, Castiglione delle Stiviere, Solferino, Volta, Medole and Ceresara.

He died in 1369 and was succeeded by his son, whom he had with Beatrix of Bar, Ludovico II in the city's government.

== Marriage & issue ==
Guido married firstly, Agnese Pico della Mirandola. They had:

- Margherita
- Tommasina

Guido married secondly, Camilla Beccaria.

Guido married thirdly, Beatrice de Bar. They had:

- Ugolino Gonzaga
- Ludovico II
- Francesco
- Barnabo
- Beatrice

== Sources ==
- Bartlett, Kenneth R. (2013). A Short History of the Italian Renaissance. University of Toronto Press.
- Wagner, John A., ed. (2022). Voices of the Renaissance: Contemporary Accounts of Daily Life. Greenwood.

Preceded by Ludovico I	Lord of Mantua; 1360–1369	Succeeded by Ludovico II
