= Luchino Visconti (died 1349) =

Milanese nobleman (circa 1287–1349)

- Lord of Milan; Lord of Pavia
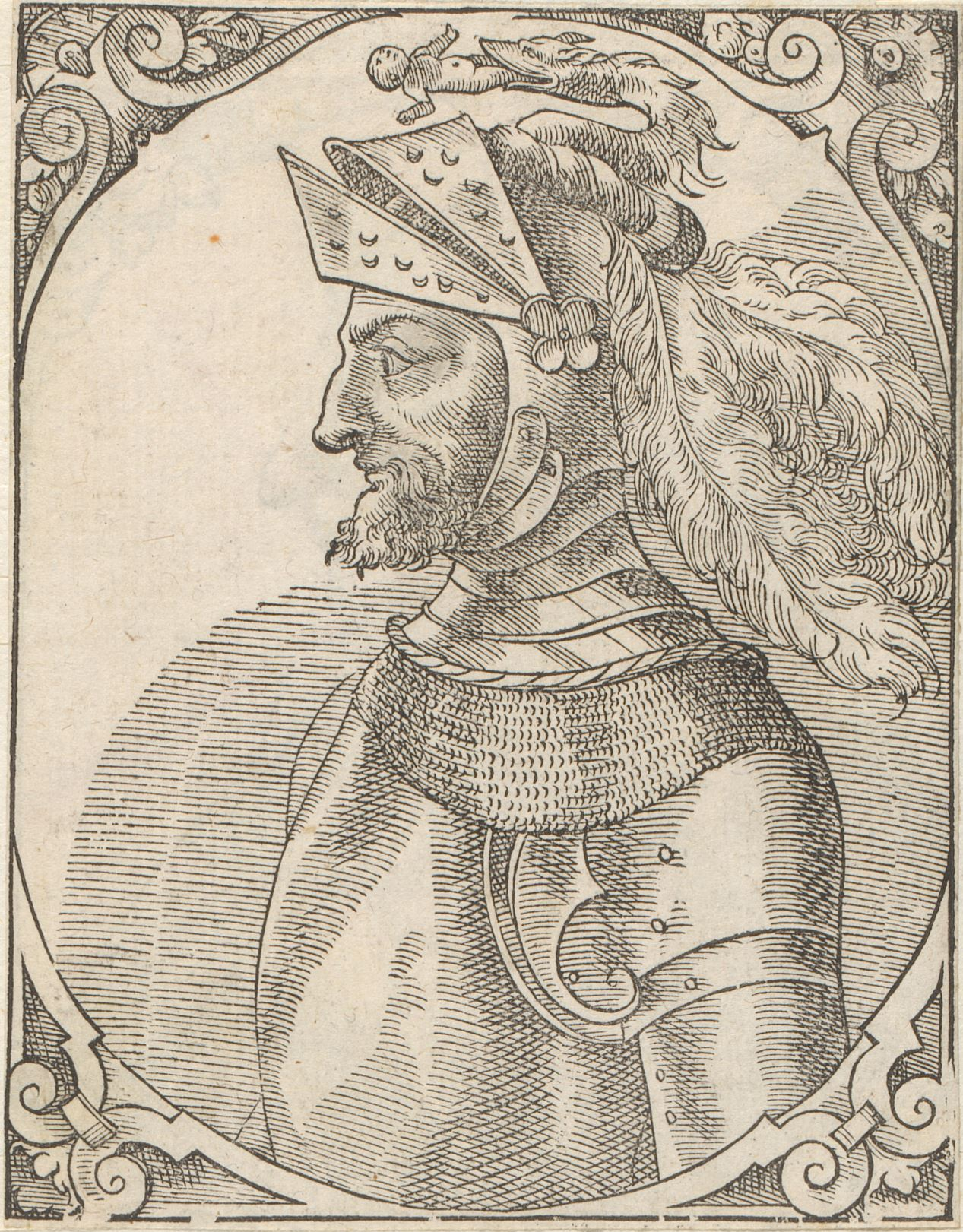
- Engraved portrait of Luchino Visconti by Tobias Stimmer

- Coat of arms
- Reign: 1339–1349
- Predecessor: Azzone
- Successor: Giovanni
- Born: 1287 or 1292
- Died: 24 January 1349
- Noble family: Visconti
- Spouses: Violante of Saluzzo; Caterina Spinola; Isabella Fieschi
- Father: Matteo I Visconti
- Mother: Bonacossa Borri
- Occupation: Condottiero; Podestà of Vigevano

Luchino Visconti (also spelt Lucchino, 1287 or 1292 – 24 January 1349) was lord of Milan from 1339 to 1349. He was also a condottiero, and lord of Pavia.

== Biography ==
Ruler of Pavia from 1315, five years later, he was podestà of Vigevano, where he erected the castle that is still visible. In 1323, along with all his family, he was excommunicated with the charge of heresy. The charges of heresy and excommunication were later withdrawn and he became a Papal Vicar in 1341.

He co-ruled in Milan with his nephew Azzone Visconti and his brother Giovanni, until Azzone's death in 1339. He also took part in the victorious battle of Parabiago against his other nephew, Lodrisio, who had set a mercenary army to capture Milan.

With an army of mercenaries from northern Europe, which he entrusted to the sons of his brother Stefano, he expanded the duchy, capturing Pisa and buying Parma from Obizzo III d'Este.

Luchino Visconti was a patron of both music and literature, having invited Petrarch to Milan.

He married three times: to Violante of Saluzzo, daughter of Thomas I of Saluzzo, then to Caterina Spinola, daughter of Obizzo Spinola, and, in 1349, to Isabella Fieschi, niece of Pope Adrian V, who gave Luchino Visconti his sole legitimate son, Luchino Novello, although others of the Visconti later disputed his parentage. He was a capable military commander and lord, but was also famous for his cruel behaviour. In January 1349, he discovered Isabella's unfaithful behaviour and announced a terrible punishment for her. A few days later he was found poisoned, and the people soon nicknamed his wife Isabella del veleno ("Isabella of poison").

He was succeeded by his nephews Bernabò, Galeazzo and Matteo II, whom he had exiled from Milan in 1346. The infidelities of Isabella were used by him and his relatives to oust Luchino Novello from the heritage.

== Ancestry ==
Ancestors of Luchino Visconti (died 1349)

16. Uberto Visconti
8. Obizzo Visconti
17. Berta Pirovano
4. Teobaldo Visconti
18. Ruffino Mandelli
9. Fiorina Mandelli
19. Aldesia Pietrasanta
2. Matteo I Visconti, Lord of Milan
20. Uberto IV. Pirovano
10. Ubertus Pirovano
21.
5. Anastasia Pirovano
22.
11. Casati
23.
1. Luchino Visconti, Lord of Milan
24. Lanzo Borri
12. Lanfranco or Ruffino Borri
25. Elsie Bouve
6. Squarcino Borri
26.
13.
27.
3. Bonacossa Borri
28.
14.
29.
7. Antonia
30.
15.
31.

Italian nobility
Preceded by Azzone Visconti	Lord of Milan; 1339–1349	Succeeded by Giovanni Visconti
