= Giovanni Visconti (archbishop of Milan) =

Medieval Italian cardinal and statesman (1290–1354)

- Lord of Milan and Pavia; Archbishop of Milan
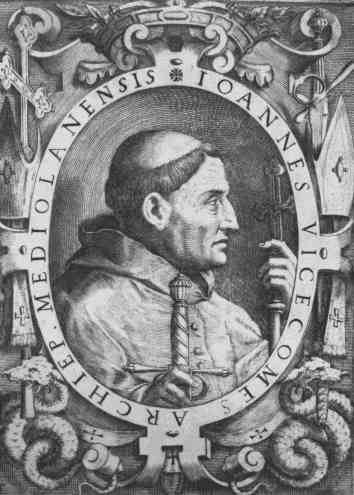

Orders
- Consecration: 1331 by Pope Clement VI
- Created cardinal: 1329 by Pope John XXII

Personal details
- Born: 1290
- Died: 1354 (aged 63–64)
- Buried: 1354; Milan Cathedral
- Parents: Matteo I Visconti; Bonacossa Borri
- Occupation: Cardinal
- Coat of arms

Giovanni Visconti (1290–1354) was an Italian Roman Catholic cardinal, who was co-ruler in Milan and lord of other Italian cities. He also was a military leader who fought against Florence, and used force to capture and hold other cities.

== Biography ==
He was the son of Matteo I Visconti and Bonacossa Borri.

Giovanni Visconti was elected archbishop by the Capitol of Milan in 1317, but Pope John XXII refused to confirm the election and instead raised Aicardus from Comodeia to that position. In 1323, John excommunicated him with an accusation of heresy, and Visconti found an ally in the antipope Nicholas V, who gave him the title of cardinal. In 1331 he became bishop and lord of Novara, and in 1339, after Aicardus' death, he triumphantly entered Milan, although Pope Clement VI only issued a bull confirming him in the archbishopric in 1342. Officially, he was Archbishop of Milan from 1342 to 1354.

Together with his brother Luchino, Visconti bought from the Pope the title of co-ruler of Milan, for 500,000 florins. After Luchino's death, he associated in the lordship the sons of his other brother, Stefano, who were Matteo II, Bernabò and Galeazzo II.

The year after Luchino Visconti's death in 1349, and with the approval of his relations, Giovanni Visconti assumed full lordship of Milan and began consolidating power in Lombardy and beyond. The same year, 1350, he obtained lordship over Bologna and placed his nephew, Bernabò, in charge of the city in 1351.

Afraid of his growing strength, in 1350 Florence organized a conference in Arezzo with a papal legate and representatives of other cities to form an alliance against Milan. Aware of these moves against him, Giovanni Visconti cultivated affection and alliance with the Ghibellines of Tuscany and Romagna. After the death of Mastino II della Scala of Verona, who had been hostile to the Archbishop, he gained the friendship of Mastino's son, Cangrande II della Scala.

In 1351, he sent troops from Milan and Bologna, and from allies in Faenza and Forlì, all led by Bernabò, to lay siege to Imola. With war occurring in the Romagna region, Giovanni Visconti was able to lull the Florentines into believing that he had no intentions towards them. However, he then had many leading Bolognese citizens arrested and tortured, and extracted confessions from them of a conspiracy with Florence to overthrow his rule. He used this to justify war against Florence and the Guelphs of Tuscany. The Archbishop placed Giovanni da Oleggio, another Visconti, in command, and he amassed an army from Bologna and led them into Tuscany to besiege and capture towns and castles, while Ghibelline allies in Tuscany wreaked havoc elsewhere in the region.

In 1353, Giovanni Visconti became lord of Genoa, which was then in the throes of a war with Venice, and in the following year, he added Novara. In 1353, Petrarch visited as his guest.

Giovanni Visconti died 5 October 1354.

== Gallery ==
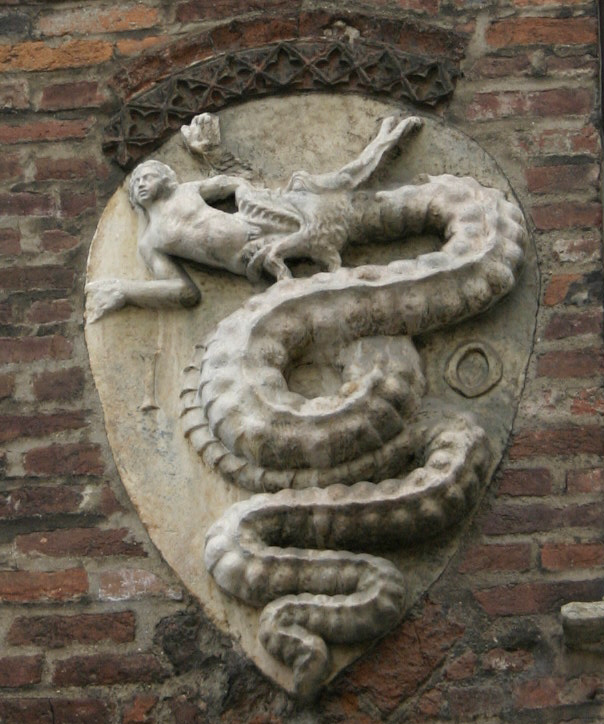
The House of Visconti coat of arms on the Archbishop's palace in Piazza Duomo bearing the initials (IO.<HANNES>) of the name of Archbishop Giovanni Visconti.

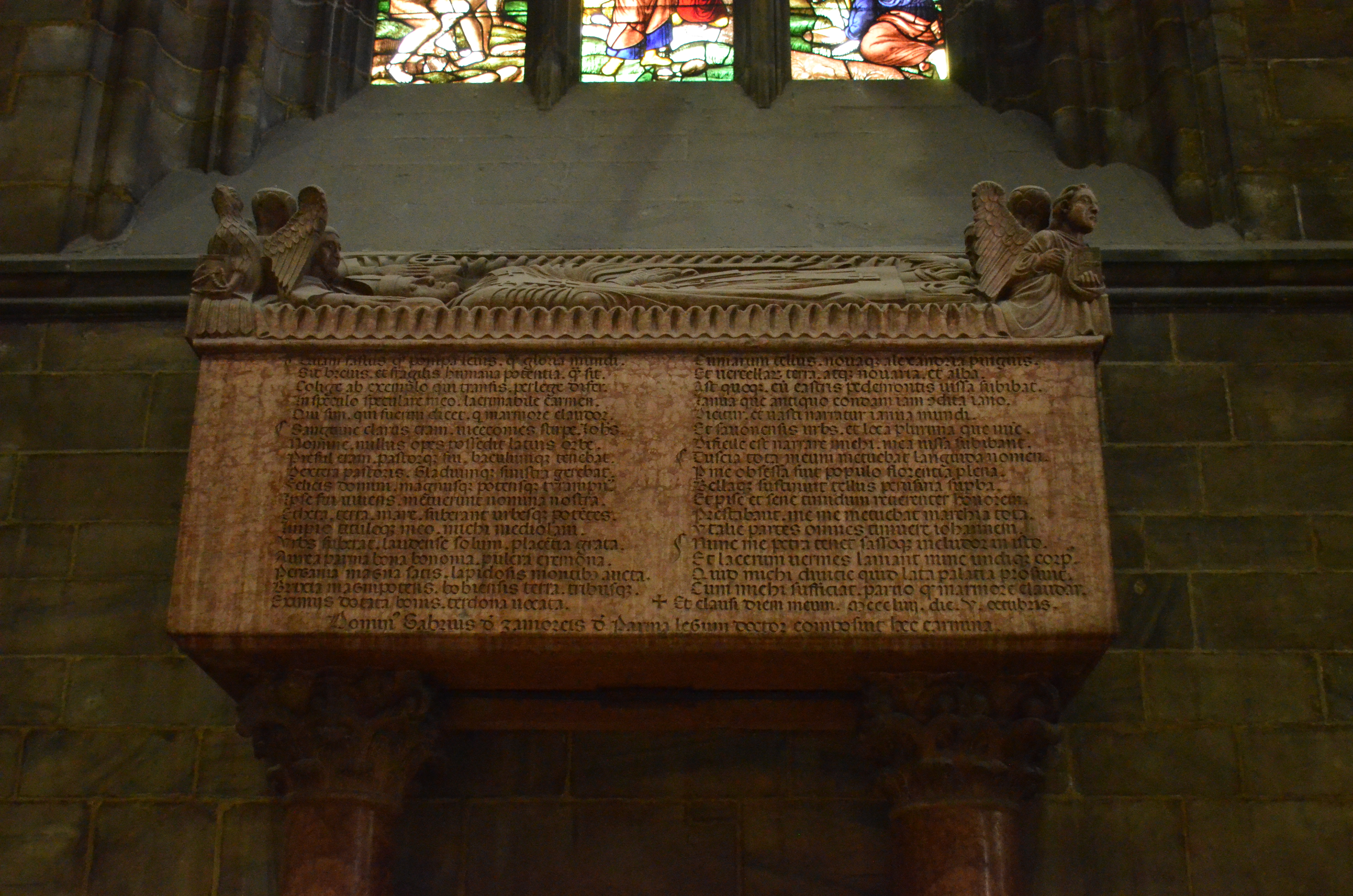
Giovanni Visconti's tomb. The shared grave of Archbishops Ottone Visconti († 1295) and Giovanni Visconti is preserved inside the Milan Cathedral, Italy. It was sculpted by an anonymous Campionese master, and it originally stood in Santa Tecla church. A Latin poem is sculpted on it, signed by a Sabino de' Zamorei from Parma and dated 1354.

Catholic Church titles
| Preceded by Raymond de Mostuéjouls | Cardinal-Deacon of Sant'Eusebio; 1329–1354 | Succeeded by Etienne de Poissy |
| Preceded by Uguccione Borromeo | Bishop of Novara; 1331–1342 | Succeeded by Pietro Filargis |
| Preceded by Aicardo Antimiani | Archbishop of Milan; 1342–1354 | Succeeded by Roberto Visconti |
Italian nobility
| Preceded by Luchino Visconti | Lord of Milan; 1349–1354 | Succeeded by Matteo II Visconti, Galeazzo II Visconti, Bernabò Visconti |
