= Egidiola Gonzaga =

Lady of Milan (1325-1377)

Lady of Milan
- Tenure: 1349–1355
- Born: 1325; Mantova
- Died: 1377 (aged 51–52); Mantova
- Spouse: Matteo II Visconti
Names
- Egidiola Gonzaga
- Father: Filippino Gonzaga

Gigliola Gonzaga, also called Egidiola Gonzaga (1325-1377), was lady of Milan by marriage to Matteo II Visconti, lord of Milan, between 1349 and 1355.

== Notes ==
Preceded by Valentina Doria	Lady of Milan; 1349–1355	Succeeded by Bianca of Savoy
