= Ludovico II Gonzaga =

Italian politician, Lord of Mantua

- Lord of Mantua
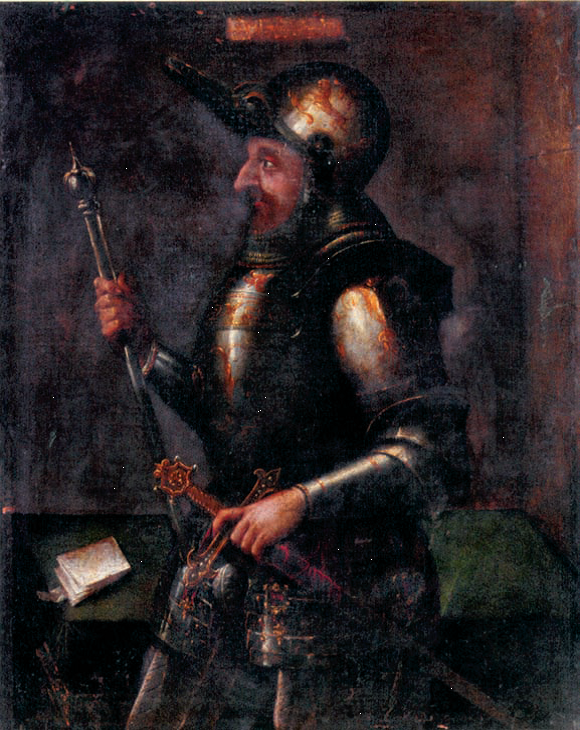
- Predecessor: Guido Gonzaga
- Successor: Francesco I Gonzaga
- Noble family: House of Gonzaga
- Spouse: Alda d’Este
- Issue: Francesco I Gonzaga
- Father: Guido Gonzaga
- Mother: Beatrice of Bar

Ludovico II Gonzaga (1334 – 4 October 1382) was an Italian politician who was capitano del popolo of Mantua. He was a member of the House of Gonzaga.

== Biography ==
He was the son of Guido Gonzaga and Beatrix of Bar. Together with his brother Francesco, he set a plot against his elder brother Ugolino, who had also been associated with power by their father, killing him on 14 October 1362 during a dinner. Despite the suspicions, Guido pardoned his sons. In 1368 Francesco also died in mysterious circumstances, and Ludovico became the only successor to Guido.

When his father died, Ludovico set a policy of friendship with the nearby Milan and their rulers, the House of Visconti. He married Alda, a legitimized daughter of Obizzo III d'Este, Marquis of Ferrara. Their son Francesco was married to Agnese, daughter of Bernabò Visconti. He also established trade links with the Republic of Venice. Internally, Ludovico built or strengthened fortifications in his land, but also faced two plots, including one by Antonio Gonzaga in 1373.

Ludovico died in 1382, and was buried in the church of San Francesco.

== Issue ==
Francesco I Gonzaga

Preceded by Guido	Lord of Mantua; 1369–1382	Succeeded by Francesco I
