= Matteo II Visconti =

Ruler of Milan (1319-1355)

- Lord of Milan, Lodi, Piacenza, Parma and Bologna
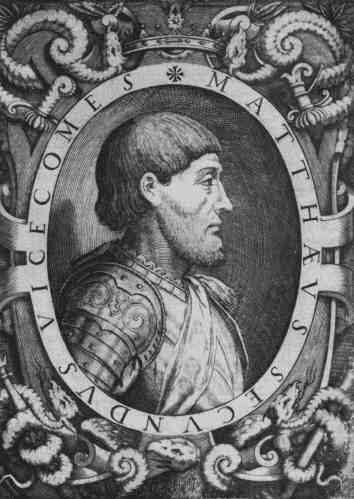

- Coat of arms
- Reign: 1349 - 1355
- Predecessor: Giovanni
- Successor: Bernabò and Galeazzo II
- Born: c. 1319
- Died: 29 September 1355
- Noble family: Visconti
- Spouse: Egidiola di Filippino of Gonzaga
- Father: Stefano Visconti
- Mother: Valentina Doria

Matteo II Visconti (c. 1319 – 29 September 1355 in Saronno) was co-ruler of Milan together with his brothers Galeazzo II and Bernabò.

== Biography ==
Matteo was the eldest son of Stefano Visconti and Valentina Doria. In 1342 he married Egidiola di Filippino of Gonzaga.

His uncle Luchino Visconti exiled him to Montferrat in 1346, but in 1350 returned to Milan. As co-ruler of the domain after the death of his uncle Giovanni Visconti (1354), Matteo was given Lodi, Piacenza, Parma and Bologna.

He died after a dinner in which, according to his mother and others, he had been poisoned by his brothers. His daughter Caterina was married to Ugolino Gonzaga of Mantua.

== Sources ==
- Bartlett, Kenneth R. (2013). A Short History of the Italian Renaissance. University of Toronto Press.
- Paoletti, John T.; Radke, Gary M. (2003). El arte en la Italia del Renacimiento (in Italian). Ediciones AKAL.

Preceded by Cardinal Giovanni Visconti, Archbishop of Milan	Lord of Milan; 1349–1355; With: Bernabò Visconti and Galeazzo II Visconti	Succeeded by Bernabò Visconti and Galeazzo II Visconti
