= Azzone Visconti =

Milanese nobleman

- Lord of Milan
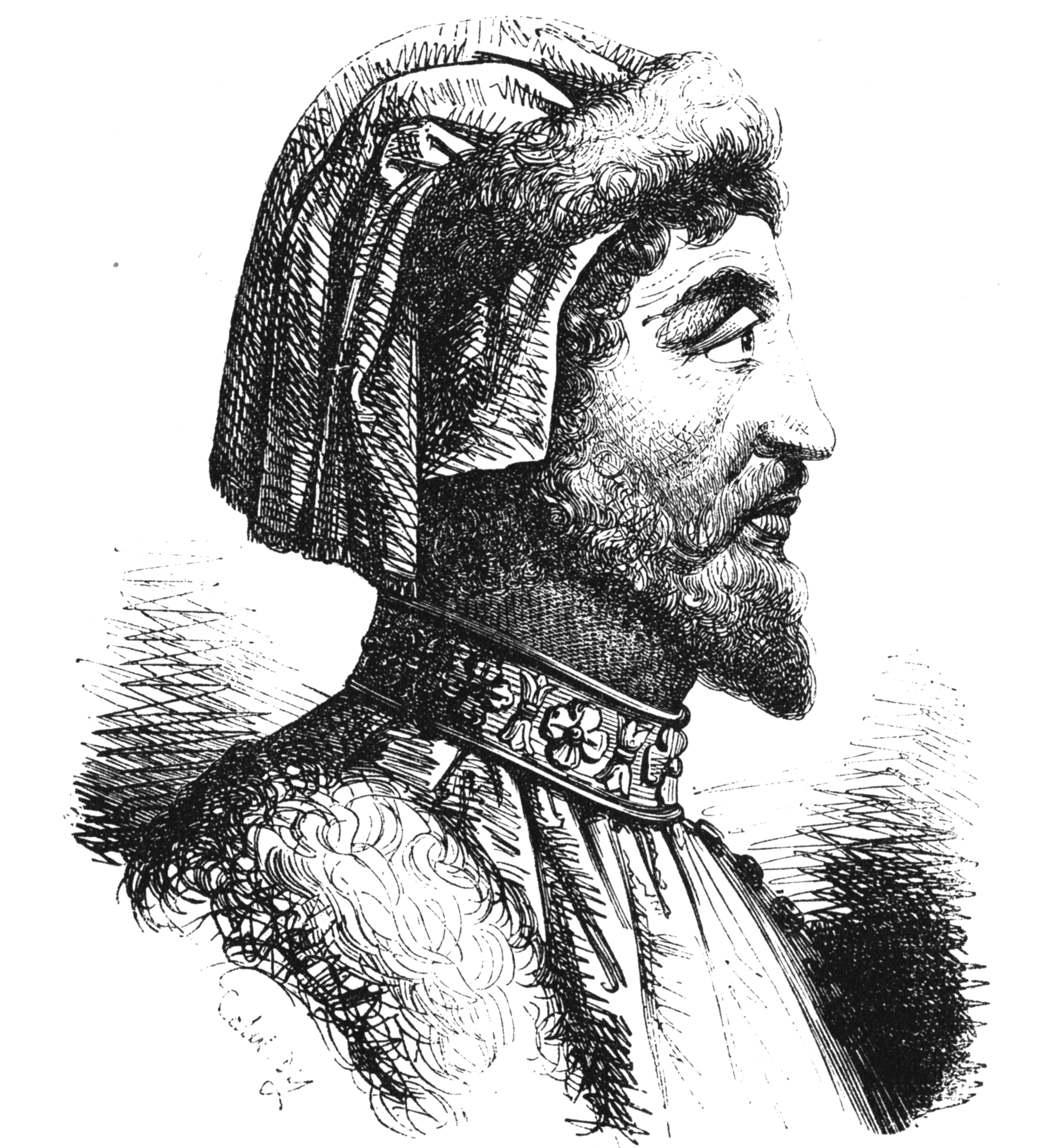

- Coat of arms
- Reign: 1329–1339
- Predecessor: Galeazzo I
- Successor: Luchino
- Born: 7 December 1302
- Died: 16 August 1339 (aged 36)
- Buried: San Gottardo, Milan
- Noble family: Visconti
- Spouse: Catherine of Savoy-Vaud
- Issue: Luchina
- Father: Galeazzo I Visconti
- Mother: Beatrice d'Este
- Occupation: Condottiero

Azzone Visconti (7 December 1302 – 16 August 1339) was lord of Milan from 1329 until his death. After the death of his uncle, Marco Visconti, he was threatened with excommunication and had to submit to Pope John XXII. Azzone reconstituted his family's land holdings, taking numerous cities. He died in 1339.

== Biography ==
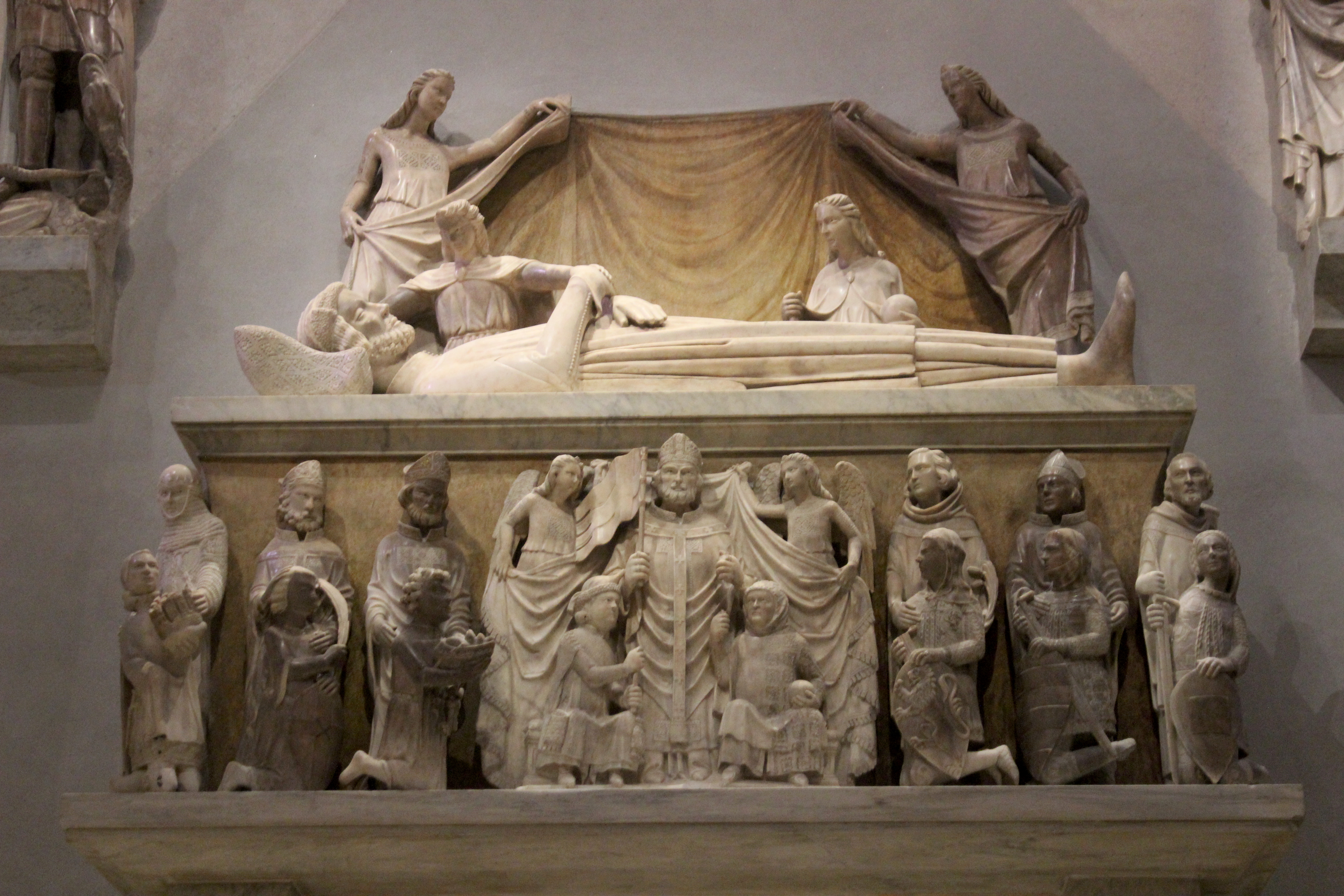
Azzone Visconti's tomb in the church of San Gottardo in Corte (formerly the chapel of the Royal Palace of Milan), was sculpted by Giovanni di Balduccio and his workshop. The relief on it shows Emperor Ludwig the Bavarian investing Azzone Visconti as imperial vicar. The monument was dismantled during the neoclassical reconstruction of the church, and rebuilt in modern times in the way we can see it now; however, several parts of it had meanwhile been lost.

Born in Ferrara, he was the sole legitimate son of Galeazzo I Visconti and Beatrice d'Este. In 1322, he was lord of Piacenza, but in the same year, together with his father, was forced to flee. In 1325, Azzone commanded troops at the battles of Altopascio and Zappolino, both victories over the Guelphs.

In 1327, his father Galeazzo and all of the other leading members of the Visconti family were arrested under suspicion of assassinating Galeazzo's younger brother Stefano. Their territories were confiscated by the Emperor, and local families took control of many cities that had long been tied to the Viscontis. Milan itself was ruled by a new Imperial appointee and a council that was hostile to the Viscontis. Therefore, when Galeazzo died later that year, Visconti power was at a low point.

Azzone immediately became involved in a struggle with his uncle Marco for control of Milan. In 1329, with the support of another uncle, Giovanni, he bought the title of imperial vicar of Milan from the emperor Louis IV for 60,000 (or 125,000) florins. (At the same time, Giovanni was appointed to several high offices by Nicholas V, the Imperial antipope.) Azzone paid only 12,000 of the promised florins, the feeble Louis being unable to force the payment. In the same year, Marco was killed, and Azzone was named as one of the assassins, but he was never condemned.

This manoeuvre drew the ire of Pope John XXII, who excommunicated Azzone, placed the city of Milan under interdict, and threatened an invasion by his French allies. Under this pressure, Azzone was forced to submit to the Pope and renounce his Imperial vicariate, although he did retain political power within Milan, and on 15 March 1330 he was appointed signore of Milan.

In 1331, Azzone married Catherine of Savoy-Vaud, daughter of Louis II of Vaud. In August of the same year, he allied with Theodore I, Marquess of Montferrat, against King Robert of Anjou, in order to capture his possessions in northwestern Italy. In 1332 he also conquered Bergamo and Pizzighettone, continuing in 1335 with Lodi, Crema and other Lombardy lands that had ceded themselves to the Papal States, as well as Vercelli and Cremona.

By February 1339, Azzone was suffering from gout. Faced with a revolt by Lodrisio Visconti, who had hired a company of mercenary troops, he had Luchino Visconti command the Milanese army. Lodrisio was defeated by the Milanese at the battle of Parabiago and imprisoned in the castle of San Colombano al Lambro.

Azzone died 16 August 1339 of a gout attack, (Note: Jane Black states Azzone died on 16 August 1339. She does not mention the cause of death.) and was buried in the church of San Gottardo, which he had commissioned some years before. He had no male heirs (having had only a daughter, Luchina) and was succeeded as lord of Milan by Giovanni and another uncle, Luchino. Besides his political and military career, he is remembered for his great construction works in Milan and other cities of Lombardy.

== Sources ==
- Black, Jane (2009). Absolutism in Renaissance Milan: Plenitude of Power under the Visconti and the Sforza 1329-1535. Oxford University Press. ISBN 9780191609886.
- Gamberini, Andrea (2014). A Companion to Late Medieval and Early Modern Milan: The Distinctive Features of an Italian State. Brill.
- Ruggiero, Guido (2015). The Renaissance in Italy: A Social and Cultural History of the Rinascimento. Cambridge University Press.

Italian nobility
Preceded by Galeazzo I Visconti	Lord of Milan; 1329–1339	Succeeded by Luchino Visconti
