= Marie-Philippe Coupin de la Couperie =

French painter

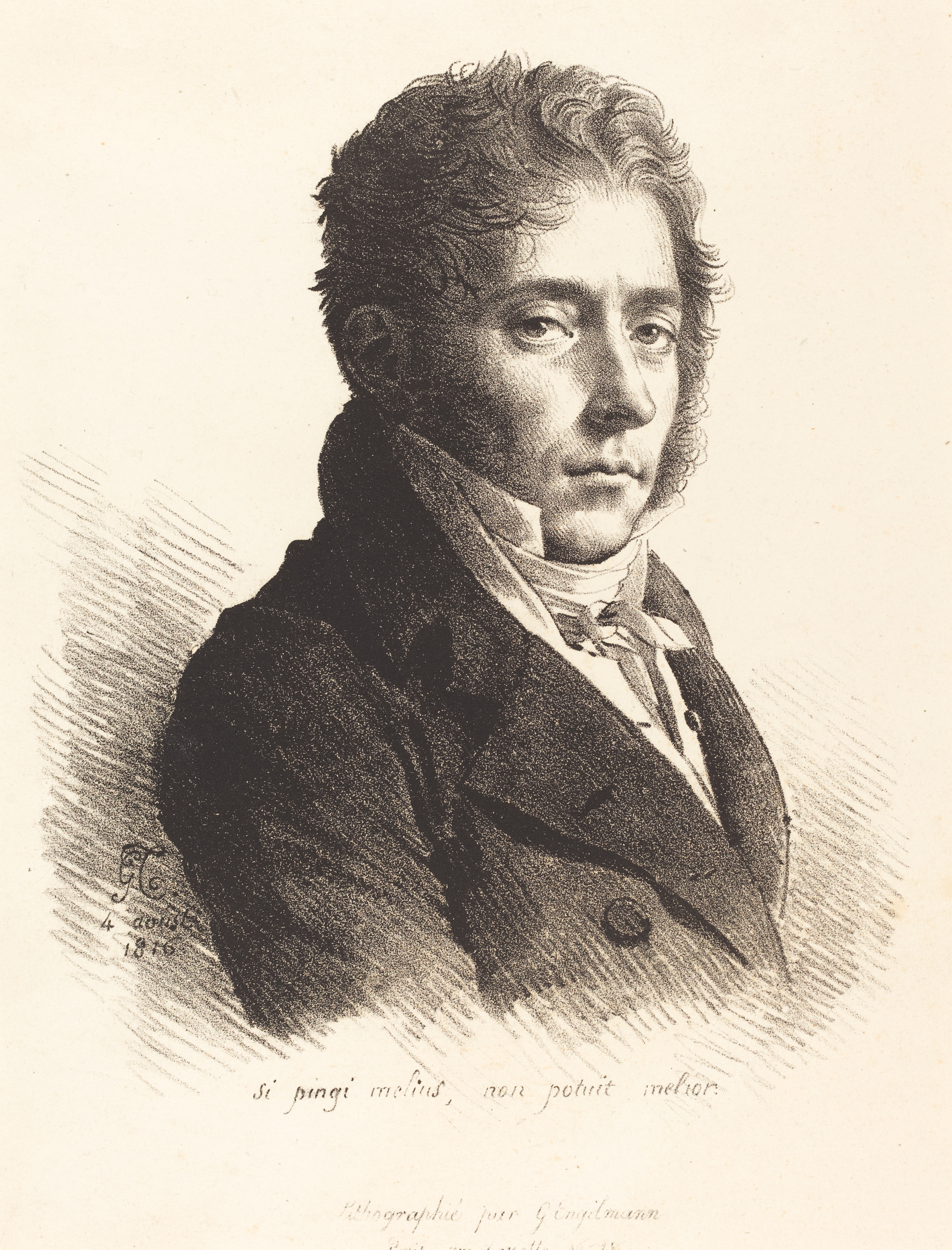
- Portrait of Marie-Philippe Coupin de la Couperie, 1816, by Anne-Louis Girodet
- Born: Marie-Philippe Coupin; 11 June 1773; Sèvres, France
- Died: 19 December 1851 (aged 78); Versailles, France
- Education: Studio of Anne-Louis Girodet
- Known for: Painting, porcelain painting, lithography
- Movement: Troubadour style

Marie-Philippe Coupin de la Couperie, born Marie-Philippe Coupin (11 June 1773 – 19 December 1851), was a French painter, porcelain painter, lithographer and drawing teacher.

A pupil of Anne-Louis Girodet, he is mainly associated with the Troubadour style, drawing on historical and literary subjects inspired by the Middle Ages and the Renaissance. He also worked for the Manufacture nationale de Sèvres and later taught drawing at the Prytanée National Militaire and at the École spéciale militaire de Saint-Cyr.

== Biography ==
=== Family and training ===
Marie-Philippe Coupin was born in Sèvres on 11 June 1773. He was the third child of Claude Coupin, a merchant from Chichery, and the elder brother of the art critic Pierre-Alexandre Coupin. The two brothers served together in the army from 1793.

According to the Deutsche Nationalbibliothek, the addition “de la Couperie” was chosen by the artist in order to avoid confusion with his brother Pierre-Alexandre Coupin.

In 1800, Coupin entered the studio of Anne-Louis Girodet, becoming one of his pupils. He remained close to Girodet's artistic circle, as well as to the porcelain painter Marie-Victoire Jaquotot.

=== Sèvres porcelain and teaching ===
Coupin de la Couperie first worked as a porcelain painter at the Manufacture nationale de Sèvres. He contributed to painted plaques intended for the pedestals of the Cordeliers vases, a group of works connected with the celebration of Napoleon's campaigns. The Louvre preserves several elements from this set, including plaques painted by Coupin de la Couperie in 1809 for the pedestals of the vases.

He later became professor of drawing at the Prytanée National Militaire, and then at the École spéciale militaire de Saint-Cyr.

== Troubadour painting ==
Coupin de la Couperie is best known as a painter of the Troubadour style. His work reflects the early nineteenth-century taste for historical, literary and sentimental scenes inspired by the Middle Ages, the Renaissance and French history.

His best-known painting, The Tragic Love of Francesca da Rimini, was shown at the Paris Salon of 1812. The work was successful and was acquired by Joséphine de Beauharnais. Another related work, Francesca de Rimini, is held by the Palais des Beaux-Arts de Lille.

Other works include Mademoiselle d'Arjuzon imploring Divine Goodness, formerly known as Gabrielle d'Arjuzon praying for the restoration of her mother's health, held by the Louvre, and Valentine of Milan mourning her husband Louis d'Orléans, held by the Musée des Beaux-Arts in Blois.

In 1824, he exhibited Raphael Adjusts Fornarina's Hair before Painting Her Portrait at the Salon. The painting, acquired by the Nationalmuseum in Stockholm in 2019, has been described by the museum as an important example of Troubadour painting.

== Selected works ==
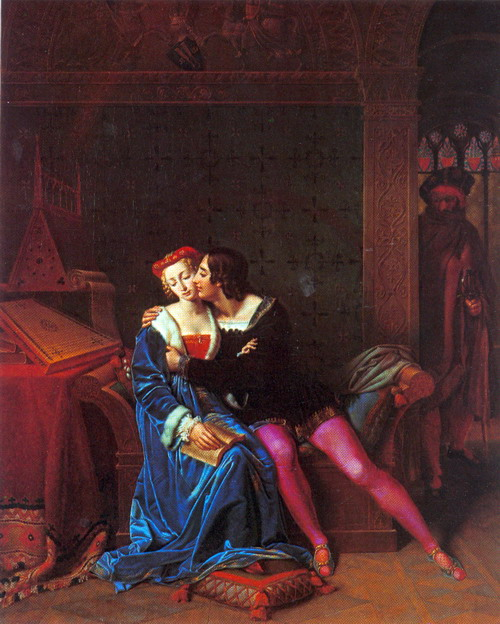
The Tragic Love of Francesca da Rimini, 1812, Napoleon Museum, Arenenberg

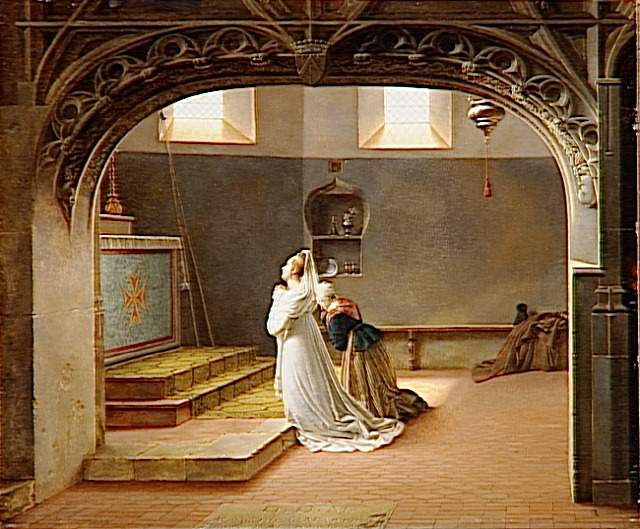
Mademoiselle d'Arjuzon imploring Divine Goodness, c. 1812–1814, Louvre

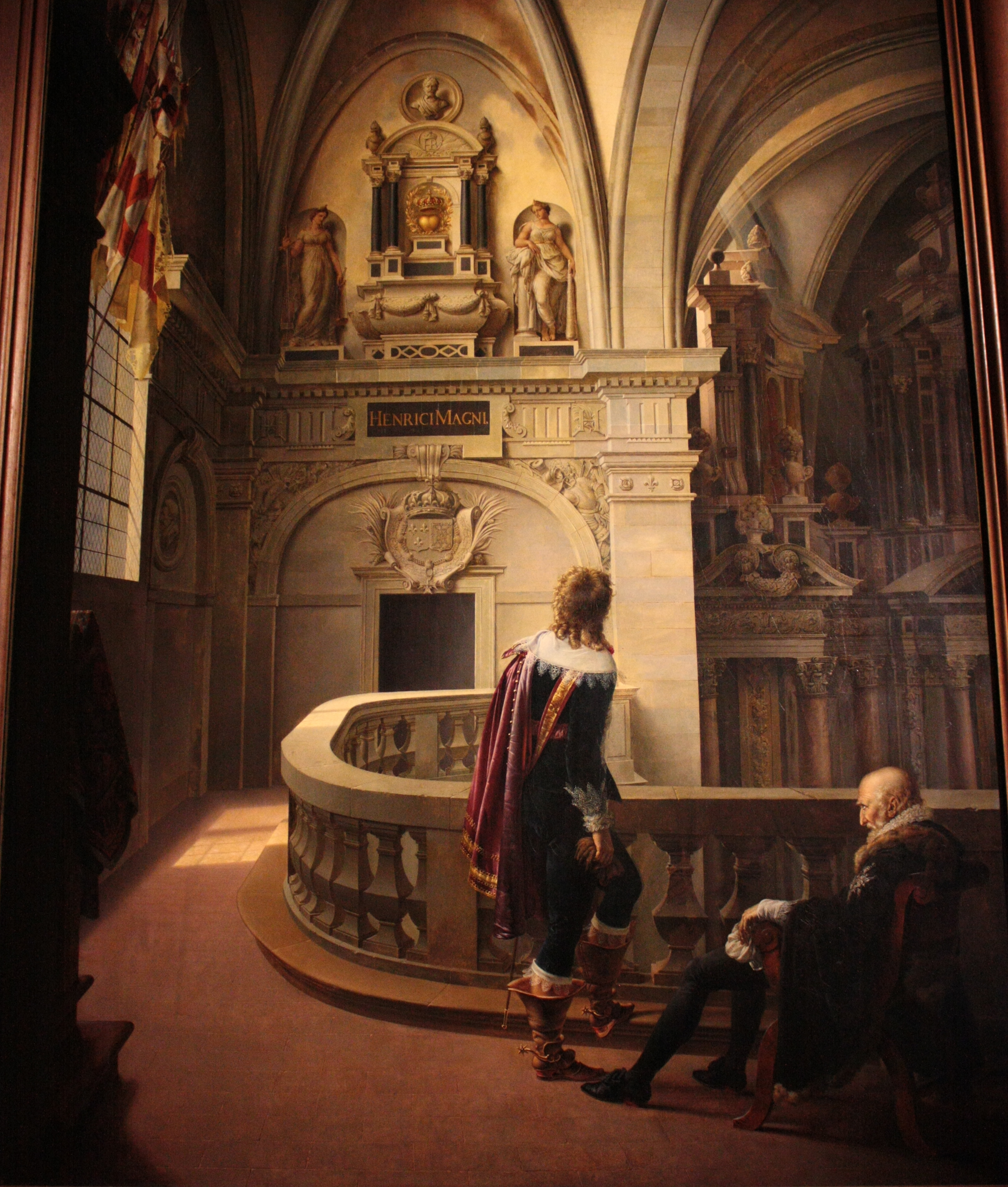
Sully montrant à son petit-fils le monument renfermant le cœur d'Henri IV, 1819

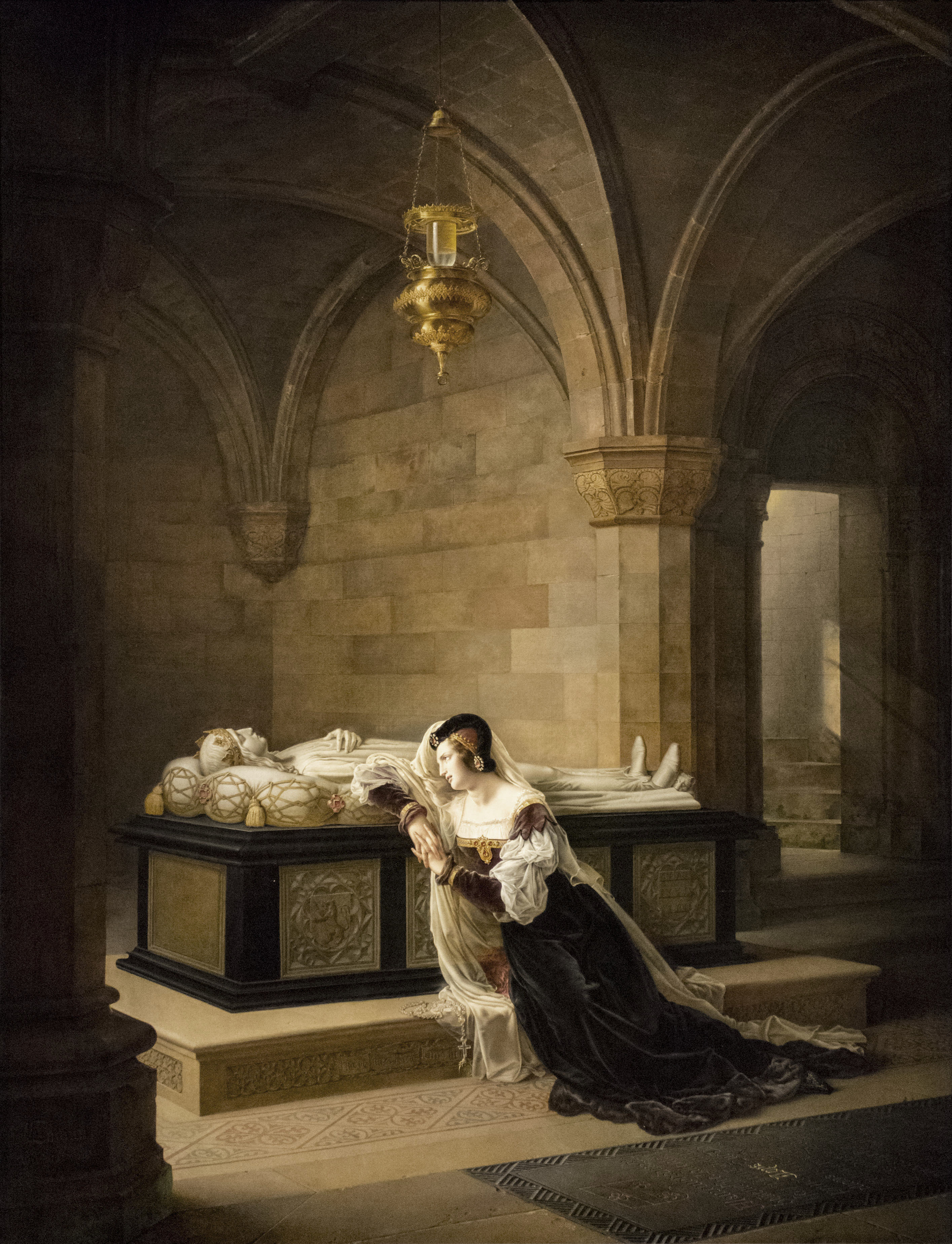
Valentine of Milan mourning her husband Louis d'Orléans, 1822, Musée des Beaux-Arts, Blois

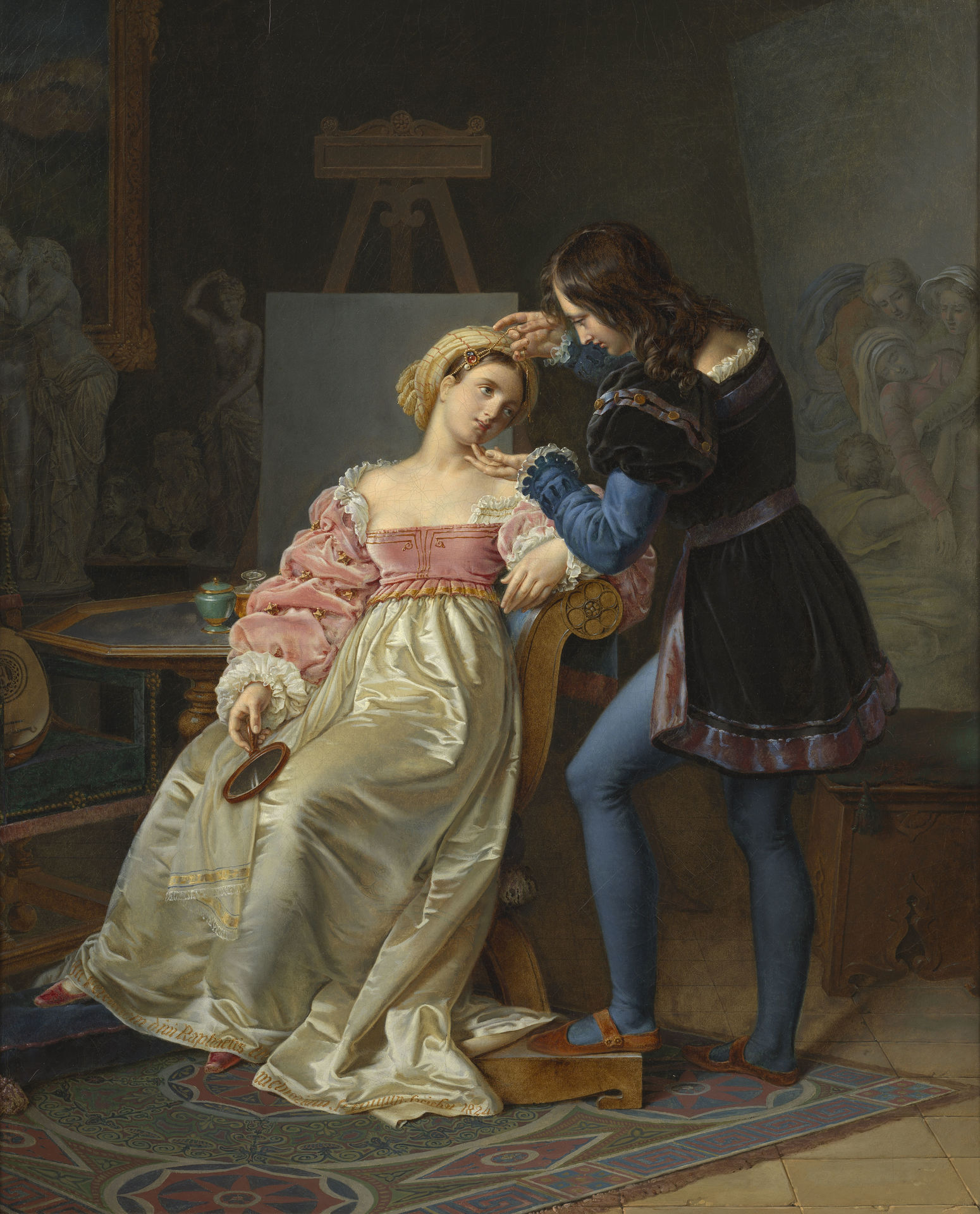
Raphael Adjusts Fornarina's Hair before Painting Her Portrait, 1824, Nationalmuseum, Stockholm

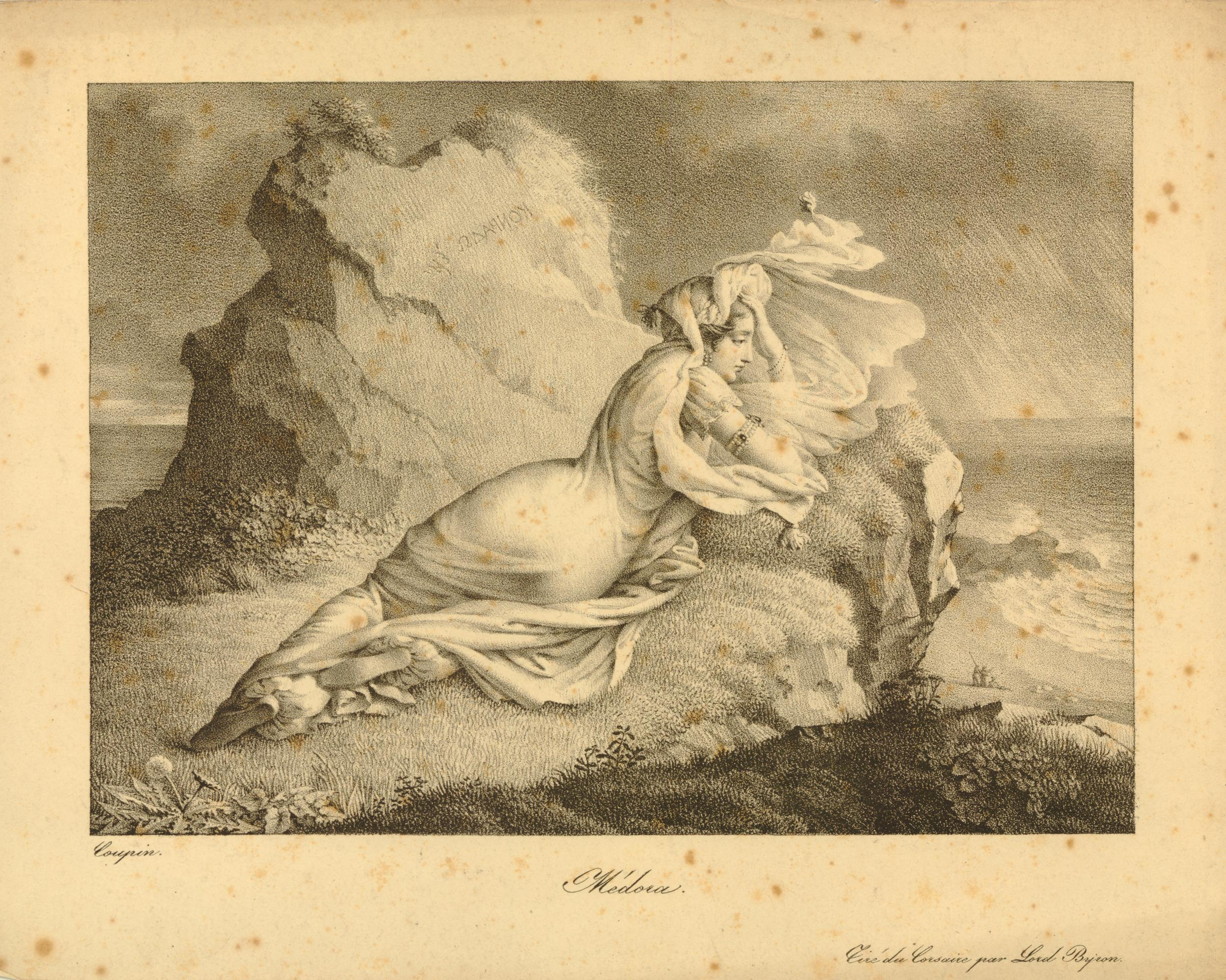
A scene from Lord Byron's poem The Corsair, 1820–1823

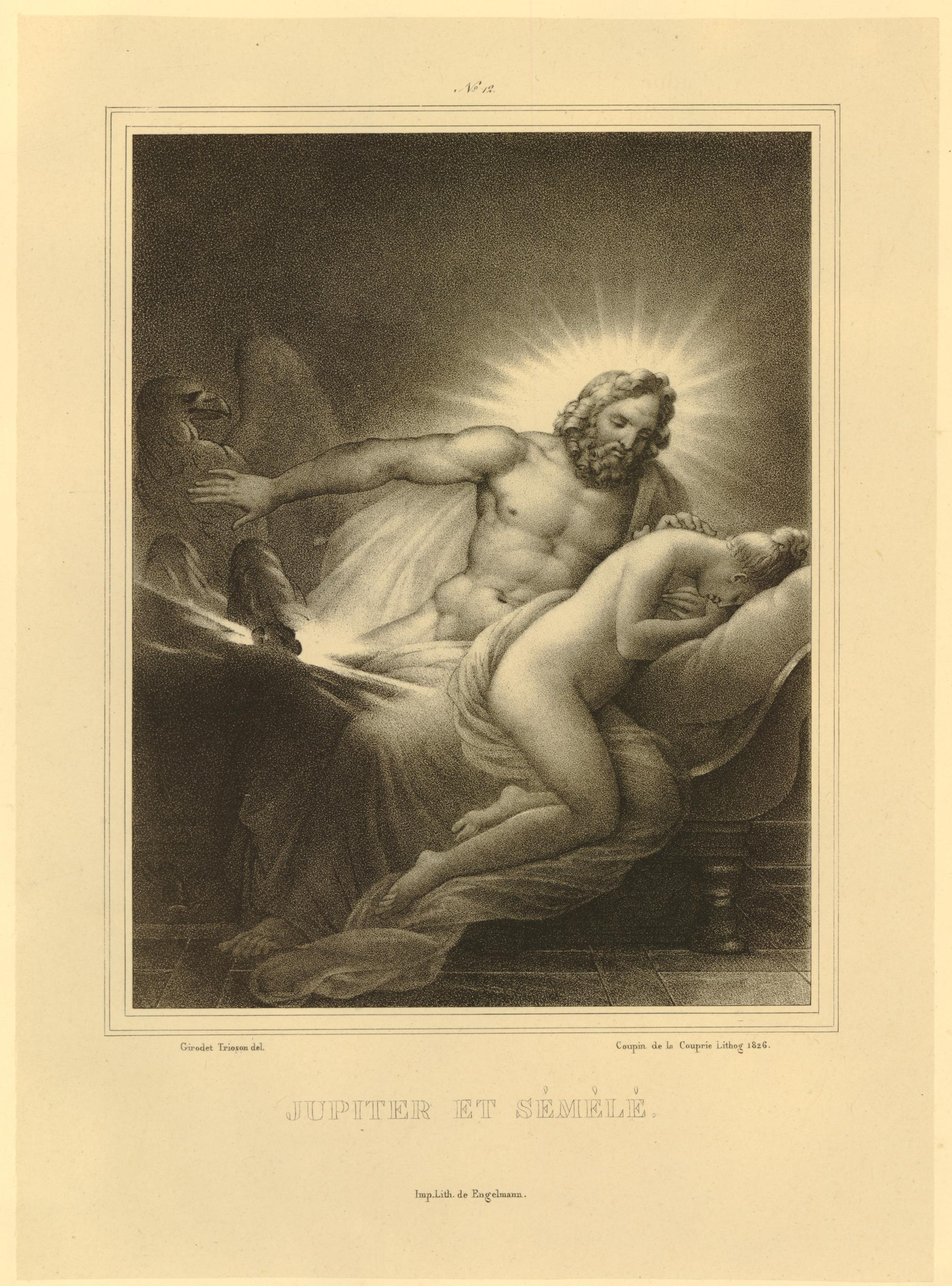
Jupiter appearing at Semele's side while the young woman is sleeping, after Girodet, 1826
