= Paolo and Francesca da Rimini =

1855 painting by Dante Gabriel Rossetti

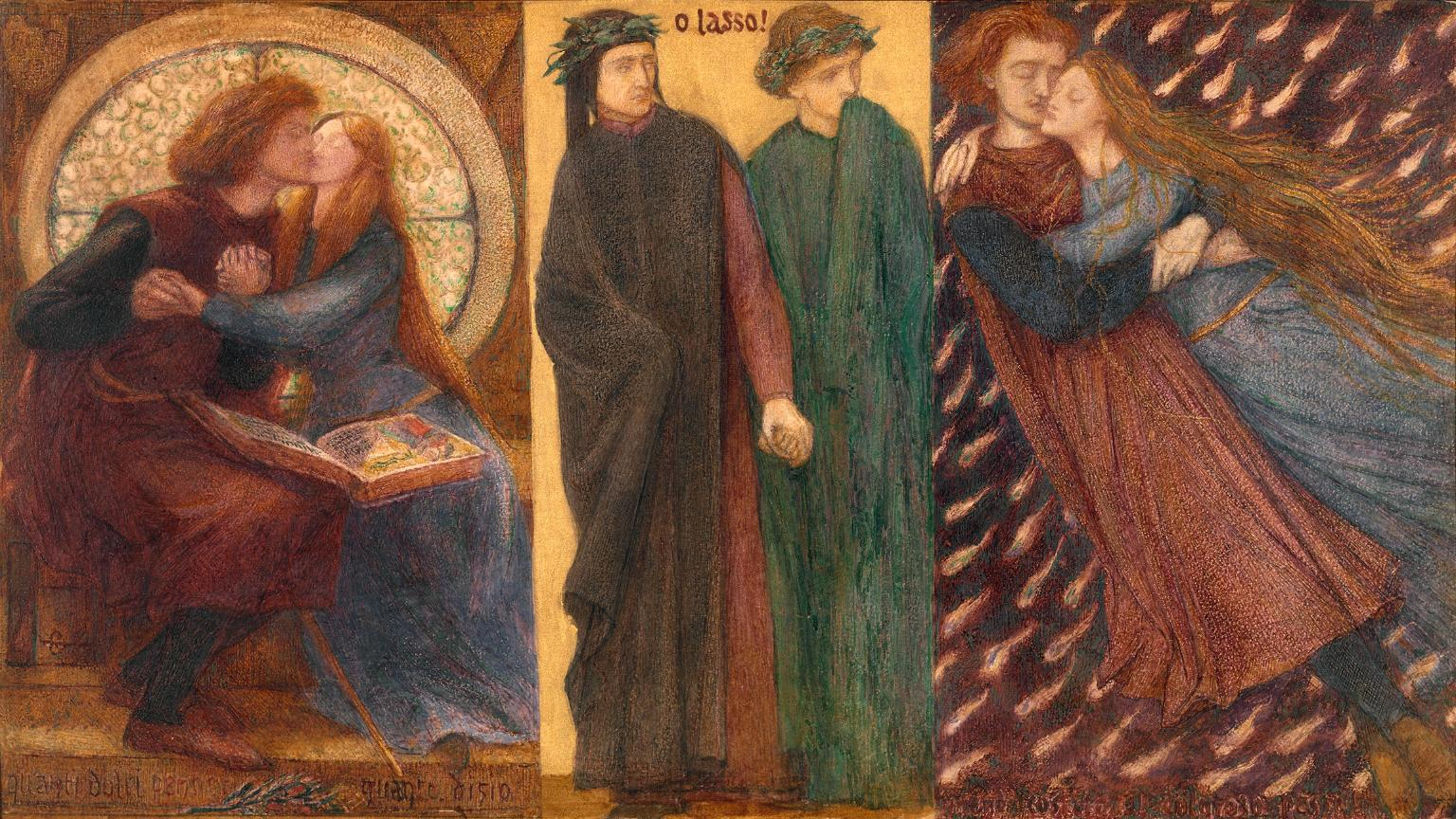
- Artist: Dante Gabriel Rossetti
- Year: 1855
- Type: watercolour triptych
- Dimensions: 25.4 cm × 44.9 cm (10.0 in × 17.7 in)
- Location: Tate Britain, London

Paolo and Francesca da Rimini is a watercolour by British artist and poet Dante Gabriel Rossetti, painted in 1855 and now in Tate Britain. The painting is a triptych inspired by Canto V of Dante's Inferno, which describes the adulterous love between Paolo Malatesta and his sister-in-law Francesca da Rimini. The left- and right-hand panels both show the lovers together; the central panel shows Dante and the Roman poet Virgil, who guides Dante through hell in the poem.

== History ==
Rossetti's real name was Charles Gabriel Dante Rossetti, but his admiration for the great Florentine poet led him to change it to Dante Gabriel Rossetti, and he proceeded to sign all his work so. In the specific, the very subject of this painting is taken from Dante Aligheri's Inferno, Canto V – it is a small watercolour triptych executed in the archaic, medievalising style of this period in Rossetti's art, and was never painted in oil. Although the artist had been sketching the subject for many years, the watercolour took him just one week to complete. The buyer was the writer and critic John Ruskin. The drawing is simple and the colours generally muted. Only Francesca's long golden hair looks forward to the more sensuous creatures of Rossetti's later works. The picture was originally planned as a triptych in oil, with the same scenes as in the watercolour, but with the lovers kissing as the central motif.

=== The Triptych and the inspiring Canto ===
Francesca was the sister-in-law of Paolo Malatesta, and both were married, but they fell in love. Their tragic adulterous story was told by Dante in his Divine Comedy, Canto V of the Inferno, and was a popular subject with Victorian artists and sculptors, especially with followers of the Pre-Raphaelite movement, and with other writers.

The triptych has several inscriptions taken from Canto V, with Rossetti bringing the story to life by writing relevant quotations in the original Italian around the edge of the composition. Its three parts read from left to right. The left-hand panel shows the adulterous kiss that condemns the lovers: staying faithful to Dante's poem, Rossetti depicts them reading about the Arthurian knight Sir Lancelot who also suffered for his forbidden love (his figure can be seen on the book's open page, dressed, like Paolo, in red and blue). The scene illustrates the following lines from Dante's text:

One day we read, to pass the time away,

of Lancelot, of how he fell in love; alone we were, and no suspicion near us ... then he, who never from me shall separate,

at once my lips all trembling kissed.

— Divine Comedy, Canto V, vv.127–136 (free transl.)

The central panel depicts two of Rossetti's literary heroes crowned with laurel: the Roman poet Virgil and the much-revered Dante himself – they regard with concern the two lovers on the right, who appear to float like wraiths in each other's arms, amid the flames of hell. Their adulterous relationship uncovered, they were murdered by Francesca's husband and Paolo's brother, Giovanni Malatesta, and banished to the second circle of hell.

In the final panel of the triptych, the lovers are being blown about violently with the wind, as described by Dante's verses:

The infernal storm, eternal in its rage, sweeps and drives the spirits with its blast.

— Divine Comedy, Canto V, vv.31–32

== See also ==
- List of paintings by Dante Gabriel Rossetti
- The Divine Comedy by Dante Alighieri
- Rossetti and His Circle by Max Beerbohm
