= Giuseppe Fraschieri =

Italian painter (1808–1886)

Giuseppe Fraschieri (1808–1886) was an Italian painter.

He was born in Savona. He initially trained at the Accademia Ligustica of Genoa, but then, under a stipend of the city of Savona, he went to study in the studio of Giuseppe Bezzuoli in Florence. In 1829, his drawing of the invention of painting won a first prize at the Accademia of Florence. He moved back to Sestri Ponente after a few years in Florence, interrupted by stays in Rome and London. In 1838, he was named Academic of Merit and Regent of the Painting classes at the Ligurian Academy. In 1842, he became director. From 1852 to 1869, he taught painting and color. His style was Romantic and among his pupils were Giacomo Ulisse Borzino, genre painter and portraitist; Antonio Caorsi; Giuseppe Ferrari; and Biagio Torrielli. In London he gained a number of portrait commissions. He died in 1886 in Sestri Ponente, Genoa.
