= Portrait of a Princess (Pisanello) =

Painting by Pisanello

Portrait of Princess
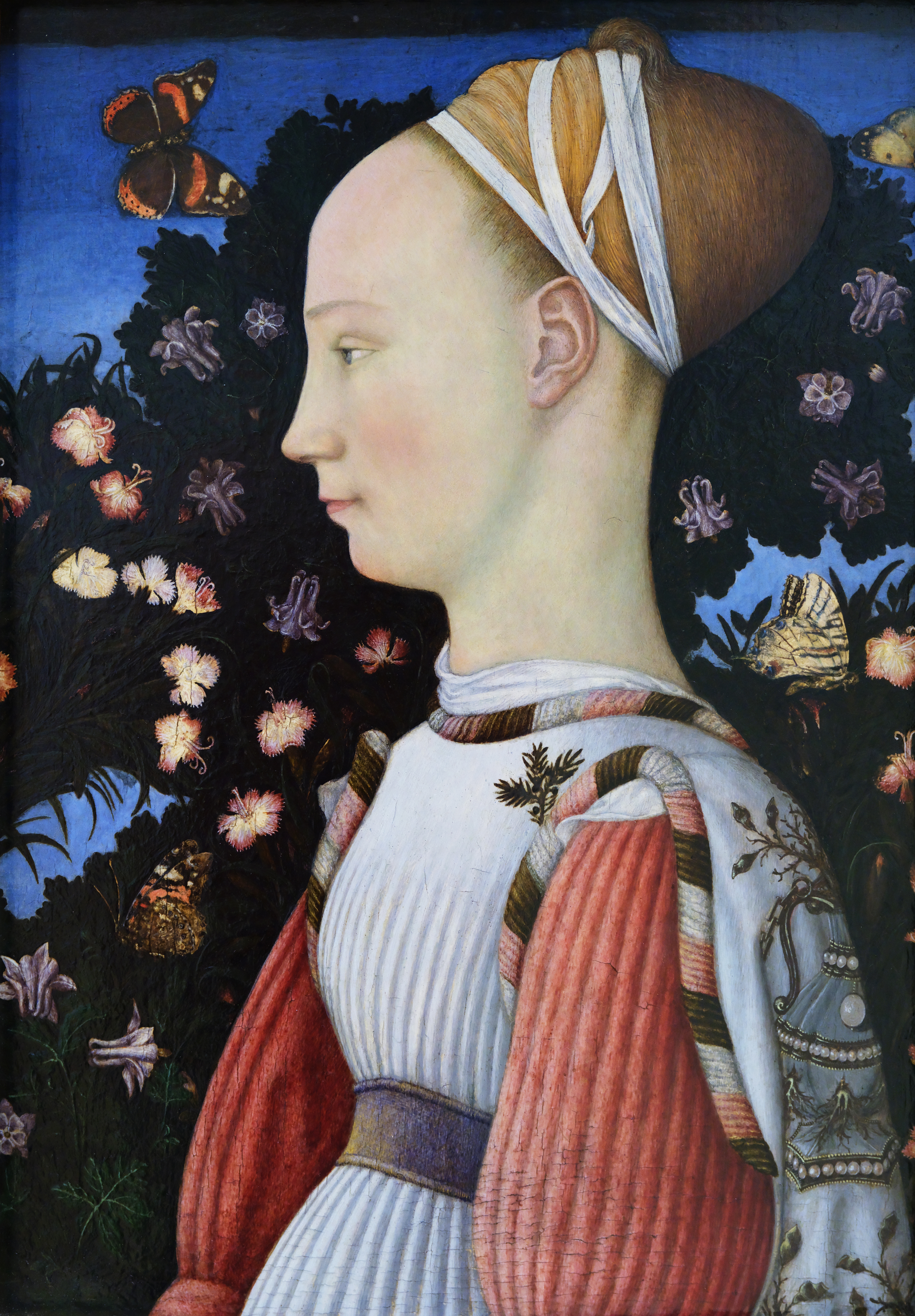
- Artist: Pisanello
- Year: c. 1435-1445
- Medium: Tempera on panel
- Dimensions: 43 cm × 30 cm (17 in × 12 in)
- Location: Louvre, Paris

Portrait of Princess is a tempera painting on panel attributed to the Italian Late-Gothic master Pisanello. It was probably executed between 1435 and 1445 and is also known as Portrait of a Princess of the House of Este. It is firmly attributed to Pisanello on stylistic grounds and because he stayed in Ferrara in the period, where he also finished a portrait and a celebrative medal of Marquis Leonello d'Este.

The princess is shown in profile against a background of numerous butterflies and columbine flowers. The butterfly (Vanessa atalanta) near the princess' brow is a symbol of the soul.

The painting is currently housed and exhibited in the Musée du Louvre in Paris, France.

== History ==
This picture first came to light in 1860 in a sale, when it was bought by the German Consul Felix Bamberg. In 1893 the Louvre acquired it from Charles Picard for 30000 francs.

For a long time there has been no doubt in anyone's mind as to the name of the artist; but the identity of the sitter remains a mystery. The portrait represents a very young woman, hardly more than a girl. Against the background of greenery, with its sprinkling of butterflies, pinks and columbines, the profile is sharply defined. Her hair is styled to create the appearance of a high, round forehead, an attribute of beauty in Renaissance Italy. Women of this era frequently plucked their eyebrows, hairlines, and drew hair tightly away from the face to accentuate this quality.

The only solid basis for a hypothesis of identification is the embroidery on her sleeve, representing the two-handled vase of the Este family; this is also found on the reverse of a medal which Pisanello designed for Lionello d'Este. Attempts have therefore been made to connect the portrait with various princesses of this family. Pisanello was one of the artists employed by them, and stayed on several occasions in Ferrara (Italy), where he decorated a room in the Palazzo Schifanoia.

Margherita Gonzaga (d. 1439) might be one possibility for the sitter. She was the wife of Lionello d'Este, and the picture might have been painted at the time of their marriage in 1433. Another suggestion identifies this fresh and young face as Ginevra d'Este, because of the sprig of juniper on the sleeve - though this may simply be an emblem of happiness and not a pun on her name. She was the unfortunate niece and wife of the redoubtable Sigismondo Pandolfo Malatesta, who subjected Romagna to fire and arms, and whose shameless affaire with Isotta degli Atti was the scandal of the age. It was Malatesta who commissioned polymath Leon Battista Alberti to build the Tempio Malatestiano at Rimini. He had his wife poisoned in 1440, when she was only twenty-two. It has also been suggested that the lady in the portrait may be a Gonzaga princess: perhaps Beatrice, or Margherita, or the learned Cecilia, whom Pisanello also depicted on a medal (cf. image at right).

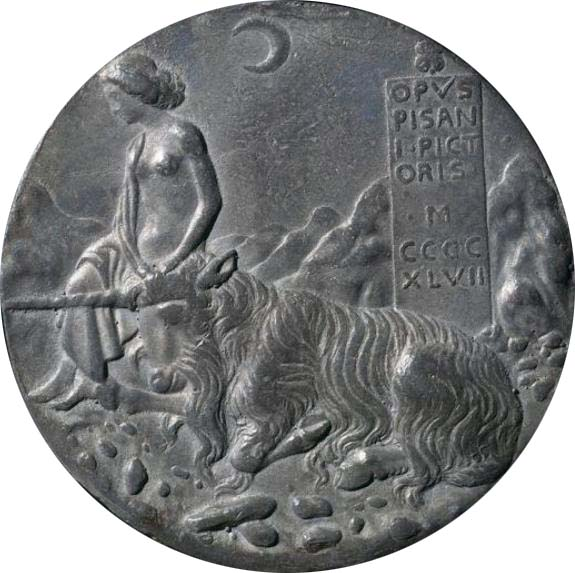
Cecilia Gonzaga (obverse), Innocence and Unicorn in Moonlit Landscape (reverse), by Pisanello (1447)
