= Malatestiana Library =

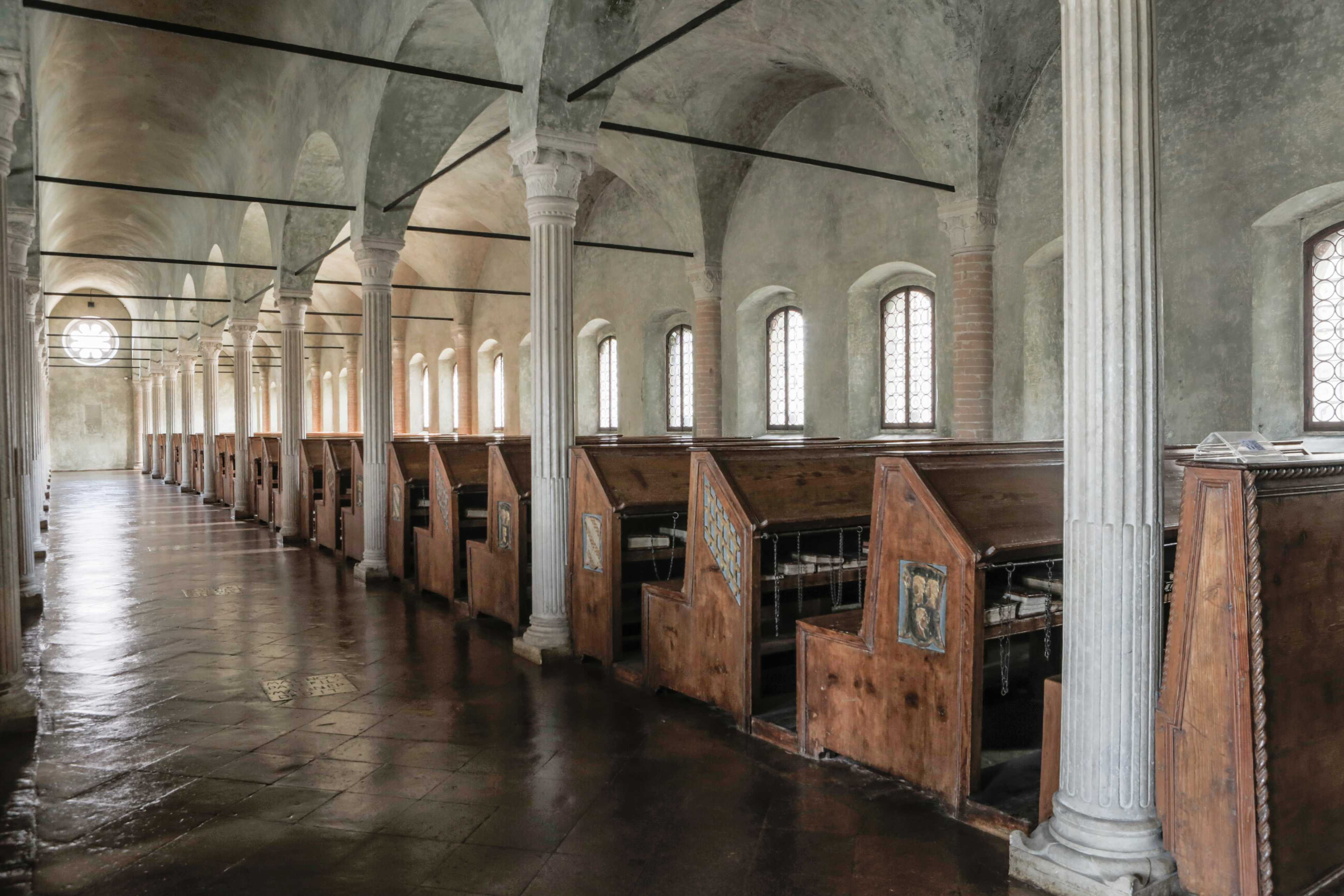
- Sala (hall) del Nuti of Malatestiana Library
- Interactive map of the Malatestiana Library area

General information
- Location: Piazza Maurizio Bufalini 1, Cesena, Italy
- Coordinates: 44°08′20″N 12°14′38″E
- Completed: 1452
- Opened: 15 August 1454

The Malatestiana Library (Italian: Biblioteca Malatestiana), also known as the Malatesta Novello Library, is a public library in the city of Cesena in northern Italy. Purpose-built from 1447 to 1452 and opened in 1454, and named after the local aristocrat Malatesta Novello, it is significant for being the first civic library in Europe, i.e. belonging to the commune rather than the church or a noble family, and open to the general public. The library was inscribed in UNESCO's Memory of the World Register in 2005.

== Background ==
For two and a half centuries from 1239, when a Malatesta was made Podestà of Rimini, the family ruled parts of the territory on either side of the River Rubicon in northern Italy where the Apennine Mountains meet the Adriatic Sea. In 1429 the inheritance was divided between two sons of Pandolfo I Malatesta. The elder, Sigismondo Pandolfo, became Lord of Rimini. The younger, Malatesta Novello, became Lord of Cesena, and founded the only early Renaissance library which preserves its original building, furniture and books.

A studium, or university, had existed in the convent of San Francesco in Cesena from the fourteenth century. In 1445, at a period when many religious houses in northern Europe as well as Italy felt the need for a room to hold their books, the friars decided to build a library and were authorised by a papal bull of that year to pay the cost from a charitable bequest intended by the benefactor for other uses. But although the initiative came from the convent, Malatesta Novello seems to have intervened at an early stage. He certainly chose the architect, Matteo Nuti, who had worked for the Malatesta in Fano and Rimini, and his promise to give the library books worth five hundred florins is recorded in a second papal bull of 1450.

Building probably started in 1447 and was completed in 1452. It took another two years to furnish the interior and supply the elaborately carved wooden doors. The new wing of the convent was on two storeys, with a refectory on the ground floor, a dormitory and the library above. The latter follows Michelozzo's design for the library of San Marco in Florence, constructed about 1440: a rectangular room with a vaulted ceiling carried on two rows of columns. Each aisle is occupied by twenty-nine benches and desks, three to a bay. The light (now partly obscured by new buildings) enters by a rosace in the end wall and a line of arched windows on either side, falling conveniently at right angles to the reader's position.

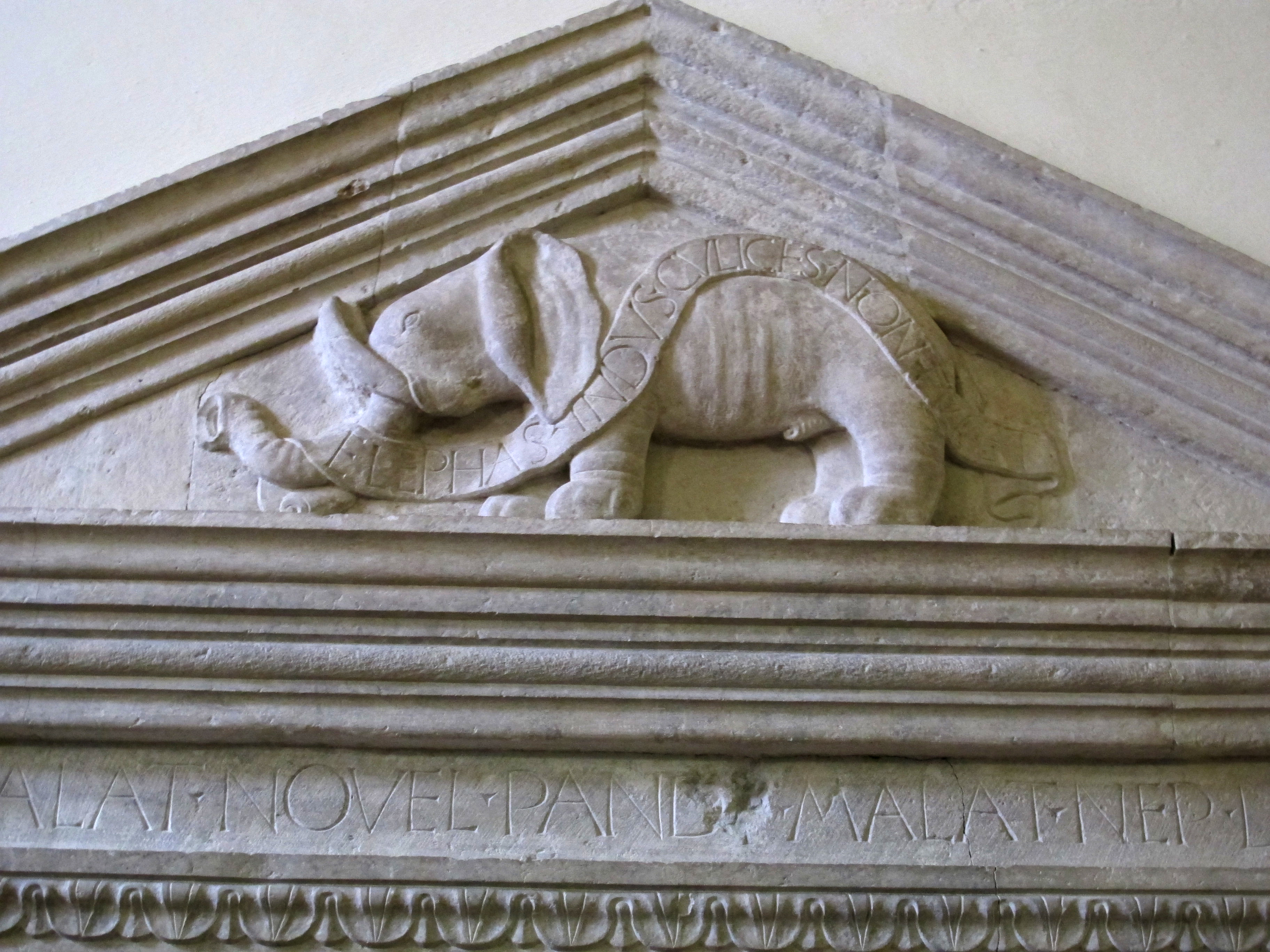
The pediment over the entrance of the Malatestiana library with the motto Elephas Indicus culices non timet

In the pediment over the entrance is the family's favourite device of an elephant, with the motto Elephas Indicus culices non timet - 'The Indian elephant does not fear mosquitoes'. The Malatesta arms and emblems appear on many capitals and are carved and painted on the end of each desk. Tablets on the entrance wall bear the inscription, MAL. NOV. PAN. F. HOC DEDIT OPUS ('Malatesta Novello, son of Pandolfo, gave this work'), a memorial repeated in a slightly different form at intervals in the floor tiles. The books lie either on the sloping tops of the desks or on a shelf below, and are attached by a chain running from a staple on the lower cover to a ring which moves freely along a metal rod fastened above the shelf.

== History and influence ==
The building and creation of the library was commissioned by the Lord of Cesena, Malatesta Novello. Construction was directed by Matteo Nuti from Fano (a pupil of Leon Battista Alberti) and lasted from 1447 to 1452. At Novello's direction, the books were owned by the commune of Cesena, not the monastery or the family. Because of this governing structure, the collection was not dispersed like many monastic libraries.

In 2005 UNESCO included the library in the Memory of the World international register.

== Facility ==
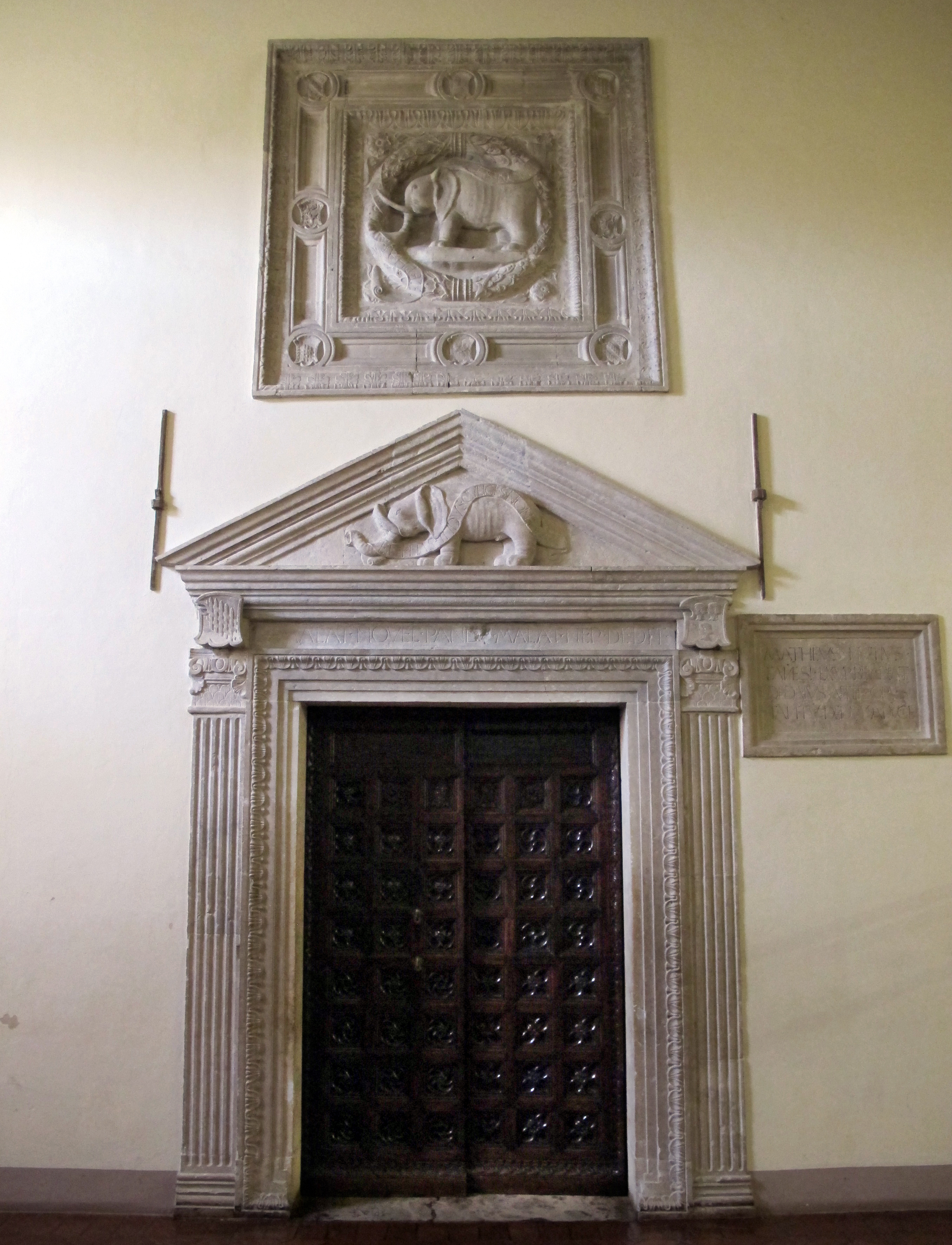
Entrance to the aula (Aula del Nuti).

The Malatestiana Library is one of the very few libraries (another one is the Librije in Zutphen, Netherlands) in the world of the so-called humanistic-conventual type, which blends humanistic principles with architecture otherwise reserved for religious buildings, and has preserved its structure, fittings and codices since its opening more than 550 years ago. The main doorway was the work of sculptor Agostino di Duccio (1418–1481). The walnut door at the main entrance dates back to 1454 and was carved by the artist Cristoforo from San Giovanni in Persiceto.

Inside, the library features geometric design, typical of the early Italian Renaissance style. The aula has the layout of a basilica (reflecting the importance of the library as a "temple of culture"), with three naves divided by ten rows of white columns made from local stone; there are eleven bays in each aisle, which are pole vaulted. The central nave is barrel vaulted and ends with a rose under which is the gravestone of Malatesta Novello.

The fittings are composed of 58 desks, with coat of arms at the sides. The light comes in through the 44 Venetian style windows, which were purpose designed to provide ideal lighting for reading.

== Holdings ==
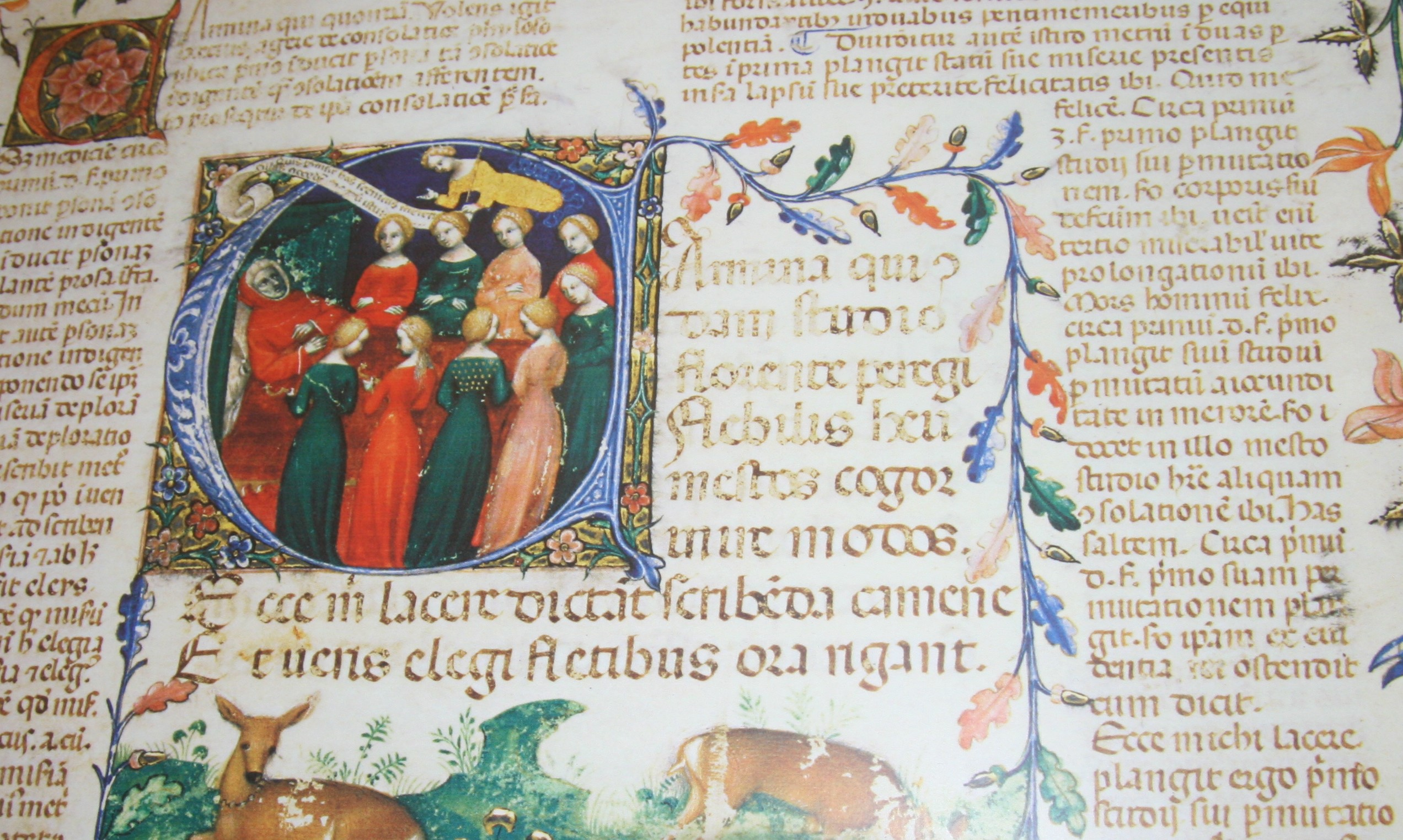
A medieval illuminated manuscript from the Malatestiana

The convent already owned about fifty books. Besides a splendid thirteenth-century Bible in four volumes and a group of handsomely-illuminated law-books bequeathed by a certain Fredolo Fantini of Cesena, all produced in Bologna, they included several biblical commentaries of north French origin and philosophical works probably acquired by Italian students or professors in Paris. This nucleus was smartened up by being rebound and having missing leaves and tables of contents provided.

Malatesta Novello greatly expanded the collection and had his scriptorium copy several works of history, literature and philology. Beside the scriptorium's productions, books came from a variety of sources. There are several Greek manuscripts, including the Odyssey, Plato's Dialogues and Republic, a Demosthenes written by a Greek scribe in Italy, and another Demosthenes bought in 1431 from a Genoese merchant in Constantinople by Niccolò Martinozzi, later Malatesta Novello's chancellor. Roberto Valturio's Res militares was a present from Sigismondo Pandolfo, and there were gifts from Cardinal Bessarion and Francesco Filelfo. Malatesta Novello bought also many late medieval Latin manuscripts, including a Boethius of about 1400 with illumination by Michelino da Besozzo and a handsome Parisian fourteenth-century Bible.

The library was expanded even further thanks to personal donations by renowned scholars: in 1474 it received the books of Giovanni di Marco of Rimini, who had been doctor to Pope Sixtus IV and to both the Malatesta brothers. After some years' delay about eighty volumes reached Cesena, mostly fourteenth-century manuscripts of medicine and philosophy. It is uncertain whether Giovanni di Marco owned the oldest manuscript in the collection, a copy of Isidore's Etymologiae written in the Verona scriptorium in the ninth century, annotated by Ratherius and doubtless abstracted from the cathedral library after the fall of the Scaligers.

The library survived a crisis during the Napoleonic Wars when the convent was suppressed, the building requisitioned as a barracks and the furniture and books removed into storage. Nevertheless in its whole history it has lost only six volumes, one of which was removed by the Inquisition and two by the French Republican commissioners.

Today the library has over 400,000 books, including over 340 codices covering various fields such as religion, Greek and Latin classics, sciences and medicine, and about 3,200 manuscripts from the 16th century.

== Bibliography ==
- Hobson, Anthony (1970). Great libraries. London: Weidenfeld & Nicolson. pp. 66–75. ISBN 978-0297000990.
- O'Gorman, James F. (1972). The Architecture of the Monastic Library in Italy. New York: New York University Press for the College Art Association of America. ISBN 0-8147-6152-6.
- Baldacchini, Lorenzo, ed. (1992). La Biblioteca Malatestiana di Cesena. Rome: Editalia. ISBN 88-7060-260-5.
- Serrai, Alfredo (2006). Breve storia delle biblioteche in Italia. Milan: Sylvestre Bonnard. ISBN 8889609249.
- Turroni, Paolo (2013). La Biblioteca Malatestiana di Cesena. Memoria del mondo. Cesena: Società editrice Il Ponte Vecchio. ISBN 978-88-6541-604-4.
- Errani, Paola; Mengozzi, Marino (2018). Malatesta Novello Malatesti. Signore di Cesena. Cesena: Società editrice Il Ponte Vecchio. ISBN 978-8865418055.
