= Roberto Malatesta =

Italian condottiero

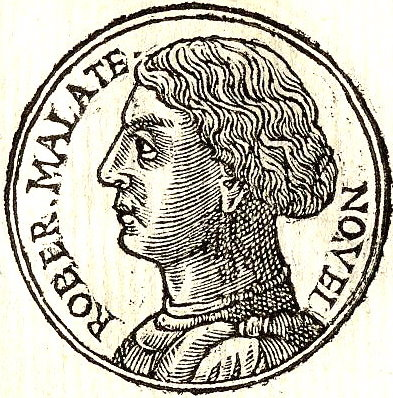
Roberto Malatesta from Guillaume Rouillé's Promptuarii Iconum Insigniorum

Roberto Malatesta (c. 1441/42 – 10 September 1482) was an Italian condottiero, or mercenary captain, lord of Rimini, and a member of the House of Malatesta.

== Early life ==
Born at Fano, Roberto was an illegitimate son of Sigismondo Pandolfo and his lover Vannetta dei Toschi di Fano, but had been legitimated to the succession by Pope Nicholas V in 1450.

Coat of arms of the House of Malatesta.

== Career ==
Malatesta debuted as papal diplomat in southern Italy (1457) to sign a treaty of peace with Alfonso V of Aragon. As a condottiero, in 1460 he fought for his father against Ancona in the war for Jesi. In 1461-1463 he fought against Pope Pius II's troops in the Marche, led by Federico III da Montefeltro; in 1461 Sigismondo Pandolfo and Roberto were victorious at the battle of Castelleone di Suasa. After several reverses of fortune, with some other victories by Roberto, the war ended with the loss of Fano for the Malatestas of Rimini in 1463. During Sigismondo's period as Venetian commander in Morea, Roberto fought for Francesco Sforza of Milan.

At the death of his uncle, Malatesta Novello (1465), he captured Cesena. Soon Federico da Montefeltro besieged it and Roberto was forced to abandon it, in exchange of a small fiefdom nearby for himself. Once back to Rimini, in 1466, Sigismondo Pandolfo named his other son Sallustio Malatesta as heir of Rimini.

In 1468, after his father's death, he was sent to capture Rimini, which was held by Sigismondo's lover and later third wife Isotta degli Atti in the behalf of Sallustio, who was designated by his father as his heir. According to the tradition, he entered the Rocca ("Citadel") of the city disguised as a peasant, and took the city in the name of the Pope, but soon started to act independently. On 30 August 1469, thanks to the support of Federico da Montefeltro, he decisively defeated the Papal troops sent to oust him. In the following years, he is said to have poisoned both his stepmother, Isotta, and his half-brothers, Sallustio (whom he had initially associated in the government of Rimini) and Valerio. In 1475, he was finally invested with the vicariate of Rimini by the new pope, Sixtus IV; in the same year, he was married to Federico's daughter, Elisabetta. Hired by Florence after a period as Papal commander, he defeated the allied troops of Girolamo Riario near Perugia in 1479; he was a nephew of the pope who was trying to establish a lordship in Imola and Faenza, and the King of Naples. In the course of the so-called War of Ferrara, Malatesta, who had re-conciliated with the pope, fought as Venetian commander. His great achievement was the liberation of Rome by the victory of Campo Morto (21 August 1482), when, at the head of the Venetian-Papal forces, he completely defeated the royal army of Naples under the command of Duke Alfonso of Calabria.

== Death ==
In the following month, Roberto died in Rome after falling ill of (most likely malaria) fever while pursuing the campaign.

His son Pandolfo, nicknamed Pandolfaccio ("Bad Pandolfo") for his cruelty, was expelled from Rimini by Cesare Borgia in 1500. After several brief restorations of the Malatestas, the city was finally incorporated into the Papal States in 1528.

== Sources ==
- Rendina, Claudio (1994). I capitani di ventura. Rome: Newton Compton.
- Herbermann, Charles, ed. (1913). "House of Malatesta" . Catholic Encyclopedia. New York: Robert Appleton Company.

Italian nobility
Preceded by Sallustio Malatesta	Lord of Rimini; 1469–1482	Succeeded by Pandolfo IV Malatesta
