= Brian Lawn =

Brian Gunson Lawn (1905–2001) was a physician, historian of medieval medicine, and collector of rare books and manuscripts.

== Life ==
He was born in Johannesburg, South Africa, the fourth child of James Gunson Lawn (1868–1952) and Mary Searle. His mother died when he was young, and the family returned to England in 1907. He read medicine at Sidney Sussex College, Cambridge, and underwent his clinical training at St Thomas' Hospital, London, where he qualified as a doctor of medicine in 1931. He obtained a practice in Barnes, London, the following year, where he remained for the majority of his life. During the Second World War, he left London to serve in the Royal Army Medical Corps, at which time he was deployed to India.

Lawn's interest in antiquarian books began as a medical student, when he purchased a copy of Cornelius Agrippa's Vanity of Sciences (1684) in 1923. Once he qualified as a doctor, Lawn was able to expand his collection, and he continued to purchase rare books and manuscripts throughout the 1940s and beyond.

== Medieval history ==
In the introduction to his catalogue of his collection of printed books, Lawn stated the academic motivation behind much of his collecting: "the books were bought for use and not for artistic or aesthetic reasons, many of them are what the booksellers used to call “working copies”." Lawn studied medieval problem literature, with an emphasis on its relation to the history of medicine and science. He published two monographs on the subject, The Salernitan Questions (1963) and The Rise and Decline of the Scholastic "Quaestio Disputata" (1993), as well as an edition of The Prose Salernitan Questions (1979).

== Collection ==
Much of Lawn's collection reflects his interest in medieval and early modern science and thought. Subjects covered range from theology, natural philosophy, witchcraft and magic, alchemy, and literature. It includes a large collection of works by Rabelais. As well as printed books, he collected manuscripts, including a c.1460s illuminated copy of Giusto de' Conti's La Bella Mano and a number of Arabic and Persian manuscripts, acquired during his time in India in 1943.

Lawn bequeathed his books and manuscripts to the Bodleian Library, which the library received following his death in September 2001. Aside from the manuscripts, this collection consists of 5000 antiquarian and modern books.

== Bibliography ==
- Brian Lawn, The Salernitan Questions, Oxford, Clarendon Press, 1963.
- Brian Lawn (editor), The Prose Salernitan Questions, British Academy, 1979.
- Brian Lawn, The Rise and Decline of the Scholastic "Quaestio Disputata", New York, Brill, 1993.
- Brian Lawn, Catalogus Bibliothecae Lawnianae: printed books, Privately printed, 1993.
- Brian Lawn, Catalogus bibliothecae lawnianae: Western and Oriental manuscripts, Privately printed, 1994.
- Brian Lawn, Catalogus bibliothecae Lawnianae: catalogus catalogorum, Privately printed, 1995.
