= Sallustio =

Sallustio is a given name. Notable people with the name include:

- Sallustio Bandini (1677–1760), Italian archdeacon, economist, and politician
- Sallustio Cherubini (died 1659), Roman Catholic prelate
- Sallustio Malatesta (c. 1450 – 1470), Italian noble
- Sallustio Pecólo (1600–1651), Roman Catholic prelate

== See also ==
- Dina Salústio (born 1941), Cape Verdean novelist
