= Sallustio Malatesta =

Italian noble

Coat of arms of the House of Malatesta

Sallustio Malatesta (c. 1450 – August 8, 1470) was an Italian noble. He was the son of Sigismondo Pandolfo Malatesta, lord of Rimini, and Isotta degli Atti. At first, Isotta was Sigismondo's mistress, but after the death of his wife Polissena Sforza, they would marry.

Isotta convinced Sigismondo to name him heir to Sigismondo's lordship, a choice also supported by Pope Paul II.

At Sigismondo's death in 1468, Isotta and Sallustio took control of his territory. Roberto Malatesta, an illegitimate son of Sigismondo, opposed his father's decisions. He would take control of Rimini with assistance from Milan, Florence, and Naples. In 1470, he would have Sallustio assassinated. Roberto would do the same to another of Sigismondo's sons, Valerio Galeotto Malatesta, in November of the same year.

Italian nobility
Preceded by Sigismondo Pandolfo Malatesta	Lord of Rimini; 1468–1470	Succeeded by Roberto Malatesta
