= Polissena Sforza =

Italian noblewoman

- Lady of Rimini
- Reign: c. 1442 – 1449
- Predecessor: Ginevra d'Este
- Successor: Isotta degli Atti
- Born: 1428
- Died: 1449 (aged 20–21); Rimini
- Buried: Tempio Malatestiano, Rimini
- Noble family: House of Sforza
- Spouses: Sigismondo Pandolfo Malatesta, Lord of Rimini
- Issue: Galeotto and Giovanna Malatesta
- Father: Francesco Sforza
- Mother: Giovanna d'Acquapendente

Polissena Sforza (1428 – June 1, 1449) was an Italian noblewoman and wife of the Lord of Rimini. She was the daughter of the condottiero Francesco Sforza, the future Duke of Milan, and Giovanna d'Acquapendente, his mistress, with whom he had five children.

She was named Polissena after Francesco's first wife, Polissena Ruffo, who had died in 1420.

Between 1441 and April 1442, at the age of thirteen, she married Sigismondo Pandolfo Malatesta, Lord of Rimini. She became Sigismondo's second wife, after Ginevra d'Este, who had died in 1440.

During their marriage, Polissena participated in the social and ceremonial aspects of Rimini's court. She had two children with Sigismondo: Galeotto, born in January 1443 and Giovanna, born in 1444 or 1445. Giovanna was married to Giulio Cesare da Varano, with a betrothal in 1451. Galeotto died young, predeceasing Polissena.

Pope Nicholas V issued a bull declaring Polissena of legitimate birth on November 1, 1448.

On June 1, 1449, Polissena died in Rimini at the Abbey of Scolca. Her death was likely due to plague, although there were rumors she was suffocated on Sigismondo's orders. The rumors are not generally credited by modern historians.

During his marriage to Polissena, Sigismondo also had a mistress, Isotta degli Atti. His interest in Isotta began in 1445, when she was twelve. Their relationship began in 1446, and she gave birth to their first child in 1447. He married Isotta in 1453 or 1454.

Pope Pius II excommunicated and tried Sigismondo in 1460 and 1461, accusing him, along with many other charges, of having both Ginevra and Polissena killed. When this failed to have the desired effect on Sigismondo's behavior, Pius conducted what he referred to as an "ironic canonization by a new and unusual mode of speech." On April 27, 1462, he publicly proclaimed that Sigismondo, though still alive, was damned to Hell, the only time any pope has made such a declaration.

Preceded by Ginevra d'Este	Lady of Rimini; 1442–1449	Succeeded by Isotta degli Atti
