= Oratory of San Bernardino, Perugia =

Oratory in Perugia, Italy

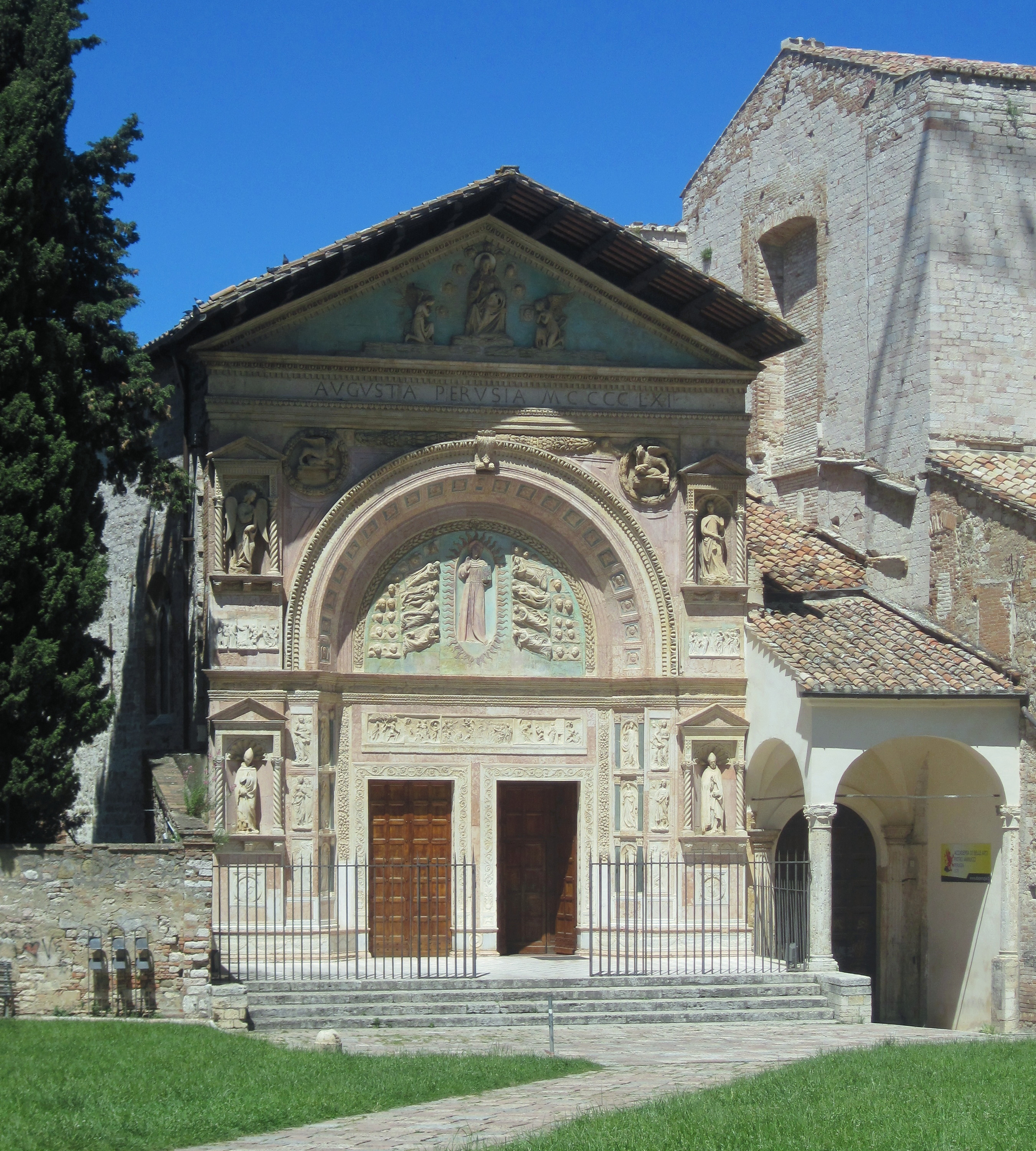
The marble façade of the oratory.

The Oratory of San Bernardino (Italian: Oratorio di San Bernardino) is an oratory in Perugia, in the region of Umbria, Italy, located on Piazza San Francesco next to the basilica of. Dedicated to Bernardino of Siena, the oratory was completed in 1452.

Stylistically the oratory is a building of the Early Renaissance. It is notable for its polychrome façade with reliefs, sculpted by Agostino di Duccio between 1457 and 1461.
