= Pandolfo III Malatesta =

Italian condottiero and lord of Fano (d. 1427)

Pandolfo III Malatesta (c. 1369 – October 3, 1427) was an Italian condottiero and lord of Fano, a member of the famous House of Malatesta. He was the father of the infamous Sigismondo Pandolfo Malatesta and Blessed Roberto Malatesta.

== Biography ==
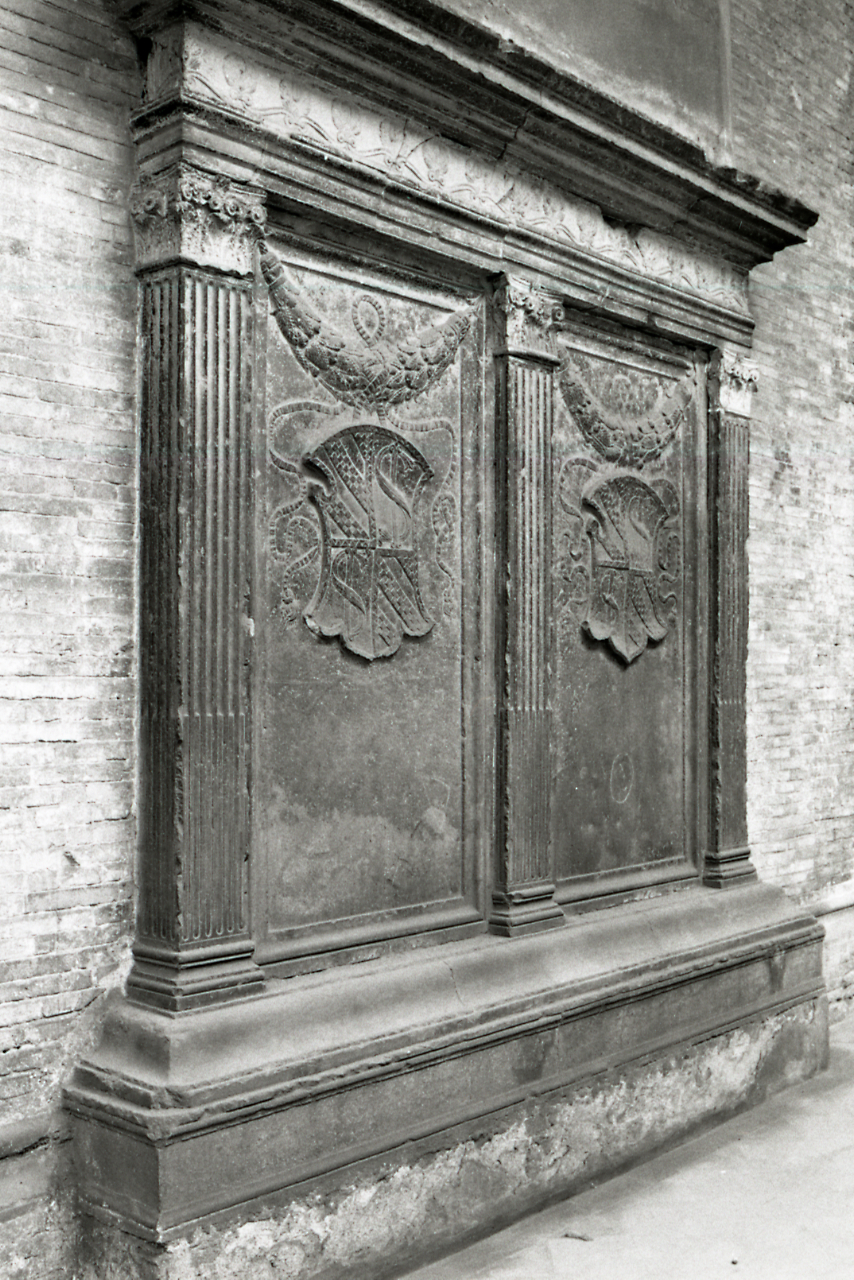
Tomb of Pandolfo III in the church of San Francesco in Fano. Photo by Paolo Monti, 1972.

He was the second son of Galeotto I Malatesta and Elisabetta da Varano After his fathers death, the Malatesta lands were divided: he received Fano, while his brothers Carlo, Andrea and Galeotto Novello inherited Rimini, Cesena and Cervia, respectively. Galeotto's sons were educated under humanists like Giacomo Allegretti and the famous Francesco Filelfo.

Pandolfo began his career as condottiero at the age of 18, leading a band of masnadieri to ravage Tuscany. In 1388 he accepted a condotta from Venice against the Carraresi family of Padua. In 1393 he fought with Andrea against the Ordelaffi of Forlì, but his occupation of Todi and Narni, then part of the neighbouring Papal States, attracted him the excommunication of Pope Boniface IX. Later pardoned, he fought against the Visconti of Milan in a League supporting Francesco I Gonzaga of Mantua.

Pandolfo then went on crusade in the Holy Land, returning in 1402. Hired by Gian Galeazzo Visconti together with his brother Andrea, he fought in the victorious battle of Casalecchio against Bologna, and was subsequently named governor of that city. After Gian Galeazzo's death, he acted as advisor of his widow Caterina. He took advantage of that position, as well as of other condottas for Italian states, to enlarge his small seigniory and ravage the neighbouring states and cities (like Trezzo and Como in 1403, followed by Brescia in 1404, which he received from the Visconti as payment of his 200,000 ducati credit, and Bergamo in 1407).

In 1413 he was created capitano generale (commander-in-chief) of the Venetian armies, and fought against King Sigismund of Hungary. A victory at Udine and a skillful retreat granted him a palace in Venice, and the title of Duke of Crete, which he refused. However, his territories in Lombardy were soon attacked by Francesco Bussone, condottiero of the new Visconti Duke Filippo Maria and provided with a strong army. Pandolfo lost Bergamo and Brescia by 1421. In 1424, in the course of the First War in Lombardy, the Florentine army led by the Malatesta brothers (with 10,000 cavalry and 3,000 infantry) was severely defeated at the battle of Zagonara. Carlo was captured and Pandolfo fled to Cesena with a few men-at-arms. He therefore lost Imola and Faenza to the Visconti, but managed to keep Fano thank to the intercession of Pope Martin V.

In the following years Malatesta devote to humanistic studies and to embellish his city.

Pandolfo Malatesta died in Fano in 1427. He is buried in the Church of St. Francesco in Fano. The grave was built by his illegitimate son, Sigismondo Malatesta, one of the most outstanding condottieri of the 15th century. His other son Domenico was lord of Cesena from 1429 to 1456.

== Marriage ==
He married his cousin Paola Bianca Malatesta, daughter of his uncle Pandolfo II Malatesta.

== See also ==
- Condottieri
- House of Malatesta
- Wars in Lombardy

== Sources ==
- Rendina, Claudio (1994). I capitani di ventura. Rome: Newton Compton.
