= Giusto de' Conti =

Italian poet (1390–1449)

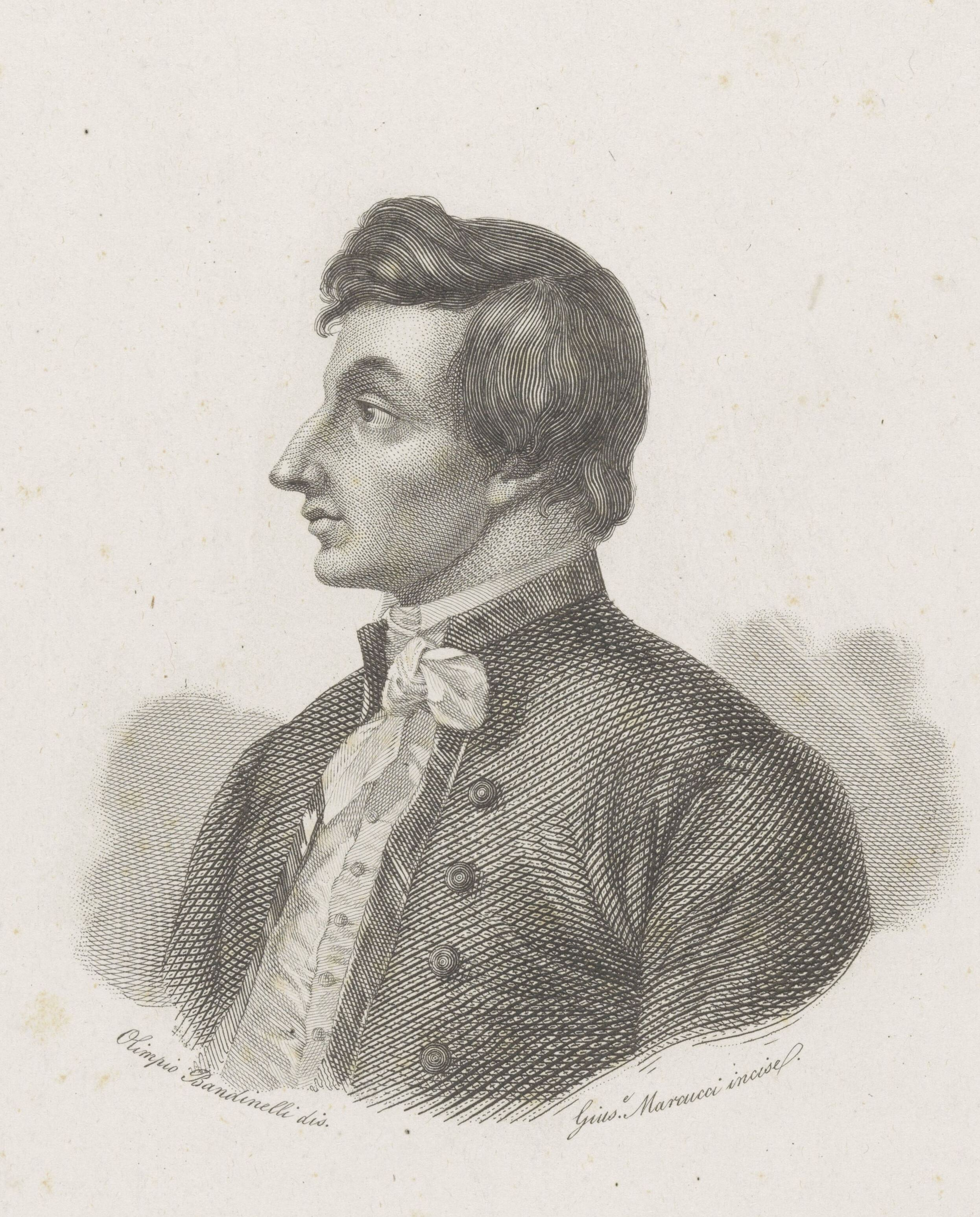
- Born: c. 1390; Rome
- Died: 19 November 1449; Rimini
- Resting place: Tempio Malatestiano
- Occupation: Poet

Giusto de' Conti (c. 1390 – 19 November 1449) was an Italian poet, author of the canzoniere La bella mano ("The beautiful hand").

== Works ==
- La bella mano (in Italian). Bologna: Scipione Malpigli. 1472.
- La bella mano (in Italian). Venice: Tommaso de Piasi. 1492.
