= Isotta degli Atti =

Italian regent

- Lady of Rimini
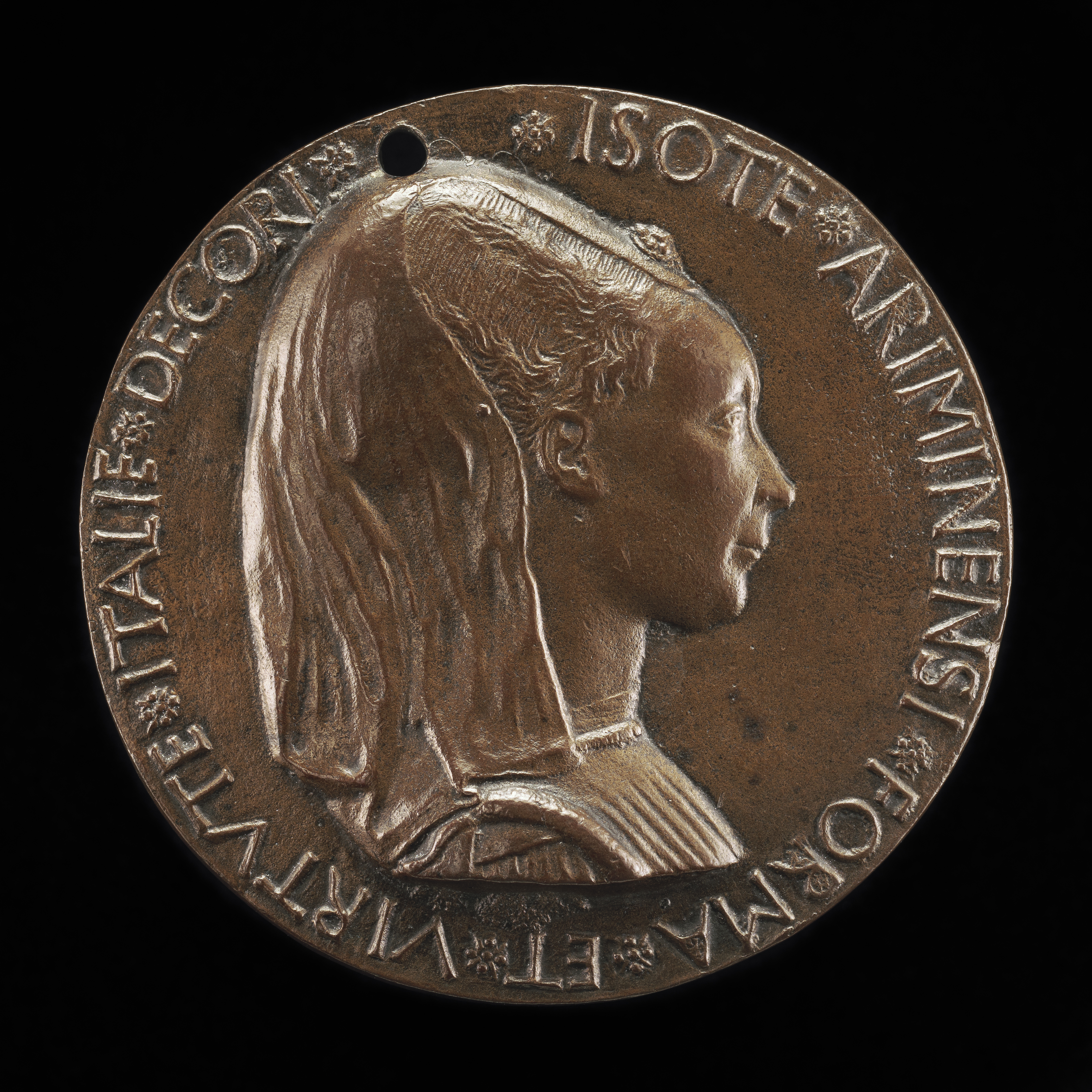
- Medal of Isotta degli Atti by Matteo de' Pasti, 1446
- Reign: 1456 – 1469
- Predecessor: Polissena Sforza
- Born: 1433; Rimini
- Died: 9 July 1474 (aged 40–41); Rimini
- Buried: Tempio Malatestiano, Rimini
- Spouses: Sigismondo Pandolfo Malatesta, Lord of Rimini
- Issue: Sallustio Malatesta
- Father: Francesco degli Atti

Isotta degli Atti (late 1432 or 1433 – 9 July 1474) was an Italian Renaissance woman and regent. She was the mistress and later wife of the condottiero and lord of Rimini, Sigismondo Pandolfo Malatesta. She governed Rimini as regent during the excommunication of Malatesta in 1460-62, as well as during the minority of their son in 1468–69.

== Biography ==
Isotta degli Atti was born in Rimini, the daughter of Francesco degli Atti, a wealthy wool trader and banker. She was noticed by Sigismondo Malatesta at the age of 12 or 13, in the period when his nearby residence was being restored, and the lord of Rimini was a guest of Francesco. As early as 1447, Sigismondo and Isotta had perhaps a son, Giovanni, who died as a newborn; he was buried in the Malatesta church of San Francesco. Their relationship became public only in 1449, after the death of Sigismondo's second wife, Polissena Sforza. The two married in 1456.

During the period in which Sigismondo Pandolfo was excommunicated by Pope Pius II, that is, between 1460 and 1462, Isotta governed Rimini on his behalf. After her husband's death in 1468, she acted as regent for her son Sallustio. The latter was assassinated the following year by Roberto Malatesta, an illegitimate son of Sigismondo Pandolfo, who took control of Rimini. She died in 1474 and was buried in the church of San Francesco.

She is featured in Ezra Pound's Cantos.

== Sources ==
- Falcioni, Anna (2005). Le donne di casa Malatesti. Rimini: B. Ghigi.
