= Ginevra d'Este =

Italian noblewoman

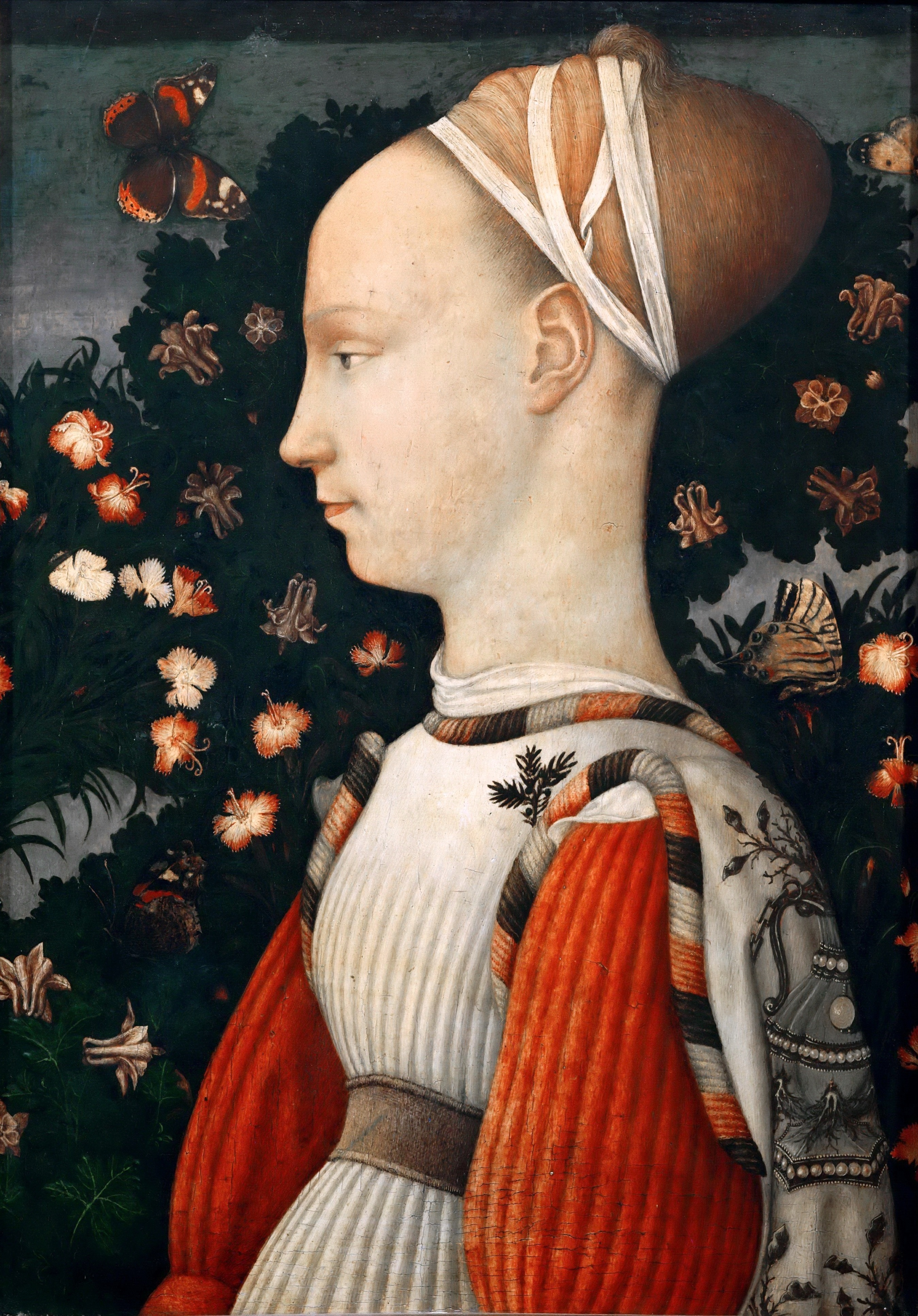
Portrait of a Princess by Pisanello - the sitter may be Ginevra. The woman also wears a twig of juniper an allusion to her name.

Ginevra d'Este (24 March 1419 - 12 October 1440) was an Italian noblewoman. She and her twin sister Lucia (died 1437) were daughters of Niccolò III d'Este and his second wife Parisina Malatesta - they also had a younger brother, who died aged a few months. She was the first of Sigismondo Pandolfo Malatesta's three wives.

== Life ==
Ginevra was educated in music and played the giga.

In 1425 her mother was accused of infidelity with Ugo d'Este, Ginevra's half-brother and he and Parisina were condemned to death by Niccolò when Ginevra was aged six.

Five years later Niccolò remarried to Ricciarda di Saluzzo, giving Ginevra two other half-brothers (Ercole and Sigismondo), in addition to her father's other illegitimate children.

One of her half-sisters Margherita d'Este had been married to Galeotto Roberto Malatesta in 1427.

As a way of strengthening the alliance between the d'Estes and the Malatestas, Ginevra married her brother-in-law and second cousin Sigismondo Pandolfo Malatesta, lord of Rimini, in Rimini in February 1434.

In 1537 Ginevra gave birth to a son, who was baptized Galeotto Novello. The event was celebrated with three days of festivities which included dancing, jousting and a parade of knights.

However the child died the following year and was to be the couple's only child.

== Death ==
On her death in 1440 she was buried in the Tempio Malatestiano. In 1461 Pope Pius II accused Pandolfo of several crimes, including killing Ginevra, and excommunicated him.

== In popular culture ==
Ginevra is briefly mentioned in The Picture of Dorian Gray by Oscar Wilde as it is claimed her husband gave her poison "in an emerald cup"

Ginevra is mentioned in the tv-series The Borgias by the character playing her brother.
