= Matteo de' Pasti =

Italian sculptor and medalist

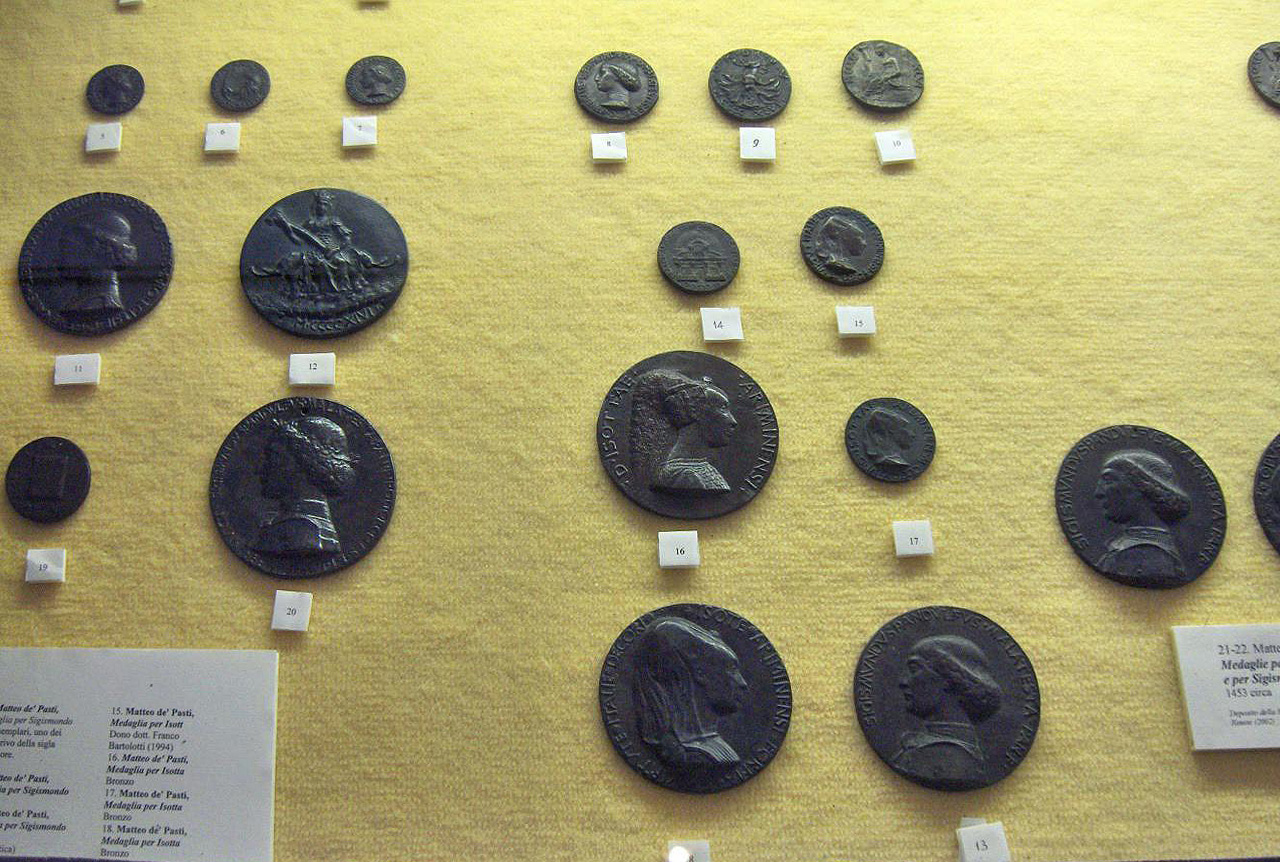
Medallions of Sigismondo Pandolfo Malatesta. Museo della città di Rimini.

Matteo di Andrea de' Pasti (1420-1467/1468) was an Italian sculptor and medalist.

Matteo was born in Verona. He worked on many royal commissions, including work for Lionello d'Este and Sigismondo Pandolfo Malatesta. Matteo collaborated with the architect Leone Battista Alberti on the design and construction of the Tempio Malatestiano in Rimini. Some of his works reside at the Cleveland Museum of Art and the British Museum He died in Rimini.

In 1461 he was sent by Sigismondo Malatesta to Istanbul to work at Mekhmed II's court. But the sculptor failed to reach Istanbul because he was arrested as a spy by the Venetian authorities in Crete.
