= Malatesta Novello =

Italian condottiero

- Contemporary portrait of Malatesta Novello
- Born: August 5, 1418; Brescia
- Died: November 20, 1465 (aged 47); Cesena
- Known for: Military leadership, Patron of the arts
- Spouse: Violante da Montefeltro (m. 1434)
- Parents: Pandolfo III Malatesta (father); Antonia da Barignani (mother)

Domenico Malatesta, best known as Malatesta Novello (5 August 1418 – 20 November 1465) was an Italian condottiero, a member of the Malatesta family.

== Biography ==
He was born at Brescia, the son of Pandolfo III Malatesta and Antonia da Barignano. In 1429, after the death of his uncle Carlo Malatesta, he became lord of Cesena, at the age of 11, together with his brothers Galeotto Roberto (the only one of age, although he died in 1432) and Sigismondo Pandolfo. Two years later, he suppressed several riots in the city spurred by the Malatesta of Pesaro; the people turned against the leader, and hailed him and his brother Sigismondo Pandolfo as lords. Also, in 1431, he quelled a revolt in Fano.

In 1433, the year since which he reigned alone in Cesena, he was created Imperial Knight by the Emperor Sigismund. Therefore, he abandoned the name Domenico to be called Malatesta Novello. At the time his lands included Cesena, Bertinoro, Meldola, Sarsina, Roncofreddo and the Piviero di Sestino. He also received Cervia by Sigismondo Pandolfo, building there important fortifications.

In 1434, when he was 16, he married Violante da Montefeltro (daughter of Guidantonio count of Urbino) then four. The two lived separated, joining only on her twelfth birthday (1442).

Aside from his military deeds, Malatesta Novello is celebrated for his large building programs in Cesena, such as the Convent di S. Maria (1438), the strengthening of the Rocca Malatestiana and enlargement of the city walls (1441); in 1452 he founded the Biblioteca Malatestiana, the first public library in Europe. He also built public works such as bridges, tunnels and dams.

He died in Cesena in 1465. His death marked the end of the Malatesta seigniory in Cesena.

== Sources ==
- Fabbri, Pier Giovanni (2007). "MALATESTA, Domenico, detto Malatesta Novello". Dizionario Biografico degli Italiani (in Italian). Vol. 68: Malatacca–Mangelli. Rome: Istituto dell'Enciclopedia Italiana. ISBN 978-88-12-00032-6.

Preceded by Carlo I Malatesta	Lord of Cesena; 1429–1465	Succeeded by to the Papal States
