= Galeotto Roberto Malatesta =

Italian condottiero (1411–1432)

Blessed Roberto Malatesta of Rimini
- Born: 1411
- Residence: Rimini, Italy
- Died: 1432 (aged 20)
- Venerated in: Catholic Church
- Feast: 10 October
- Attributes: beardless youth dressed as a Franciscan tertiary or as a finely dressed young man in secular clothes

Galeotto Roberto Malatesta (1411–1432) was an Italian condottiero and blessed of the Catholic Church.

== Life ==
He was the son of Pandolfo III Malatesta and succeeded him in the lordship of Rimini in contrast with the local bishop; after the people rose against the latter, he obtained by Pope Martin V that his father's lands were entrusted to him and his brothers Domenico and the notorious Sigismondo.

Later, he had to face a rebellion spurred by Giovanni V Malatesta, but the people helped him in confirming his territories. Galeotto Roberto also thwarted the aims on Cesena of the Malatesta branch of Pesaro.

In 1427, aged 16, he married Margherita d'Este, one of the illegitimate daughters of Niccolò III, Lord of Ferrara. His wife survived him by more than 40 years, but she never married again and wanted to be buried by his side.

In 1432 he was given the command of 200 knights by Pope Eugene IV, but he died the same year at Sant'Arcangelo, at the age of 20.

== Sainthood ==
Roberto Malatesta unlike his more famous brother Sigismondo was remembered as a man of great holiness and goodness. Although never officially beatified or canonised by the Catholic Church he was proclaimed a blessed informally by the people of Rimini. Roberto was said to have helped the poor with alms and visited the sick in their homes or in hospital for which he was fondly remembered. A deeply pious man, he led an intense prayer life and became a member of the secular Franciscans after having a vision of St. Francis of Assisi who appeared to him. He was depicted in a medieval fresco beside St. Francis in a church at Rovereto which highlights the public cult he enjoyed as a saint figure following his death. Roberto was also depicted in another fresco dated to just after 1432 in which he is represented in his secular clothes His wife Margaret donated his Franciscan robe to St. Catherine of Bologna and this robe can still be seen today in her church in Bologna.

== Sources ==
- Clementini, Cesare (1617). Raccolto istorico della fondazione di rimino e dell'origine e vite dei Malatesti. Rimini.
- Prescott, Orville (1970). Princes of the Renaissance.
- Bertelli, Sergio (1986). The Courts of the Italian Renaissance.
