= Agostino di Duccio =

Italian sculptor

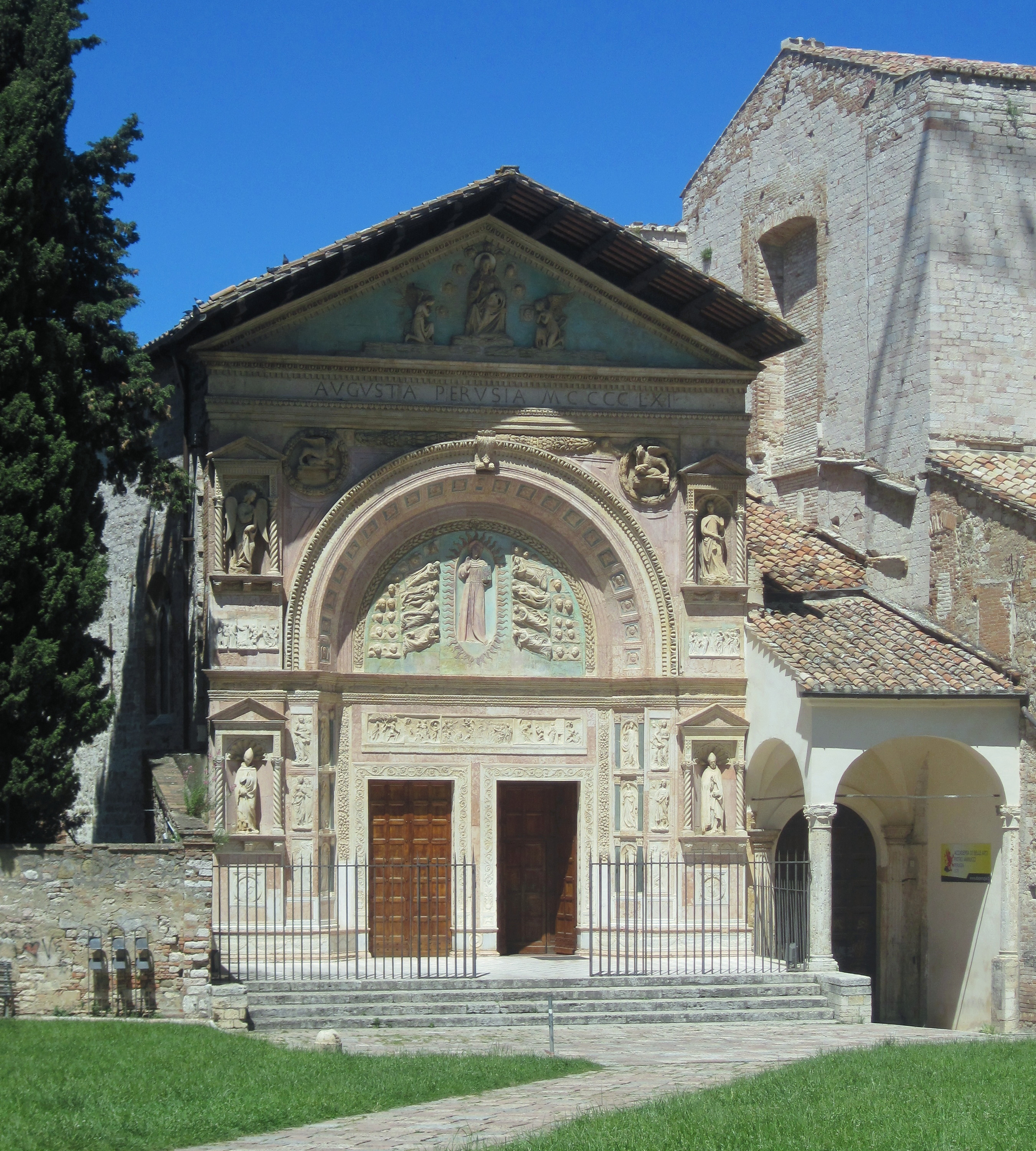
The marble façade of the Oratory of San Bernardino in Perugia, 1457–62

Agostino di Duccio (Florence, 1418 – Perugia, c. 1481) was an early Renaissance Italian sculptor.

Born in Florence, he worked in Prato with Donatello and Michelozzo, who influenced him greatly. In 1441, he was accused of stealing precious materials from a Florentine monastery and was temporarily banished from his native city as a result. The following year he continued the work on the altar of S. Geminiano for the Cathedral of Modena, a work noticeable for the influence of Michelozzo.

In 1446, he studied late Gothic sculpture in Venice and met Matteo de' Pasti, a fellow sculptor who called on him to execute the sculptural decoration of the Tempio Malatestiano in Rimini, where he stayed from 1449 to 1457. The decorations were supposed to be a sort of medieval encyclopedia, with reliefs of zodiacal and other allegorical and mythological figures.

Between 1457 and 1462 he created the marble façade of the church of S. Bernardino at Perugia and the following years until 1470 he created many works especially in Florence, such as the Madonna of Auvillers for Piero di Cosimo de' Medici, now found at the Louvre, Paris.

In 1464, the overseers (operaio) of Florence Cathedral commissioned Agostino to carve a marble statue of David, the underdog figure of the Old Testament, who had become a symbol for the city state, about 3.5 m tall, to stand high up on its eastern end. This was intended to be formed in the Roman fashion from several blocks, but in 1465 Agostino travelled to Carrara to source his marble and acquired a huge block from the Fantiscritti quarries. Described as nine braccia (over 5 metres) long, of moderate quality (bianco ordinario) and "rather shallow", its original maximum dimensions are otherwise unknown, but from the resulting statue the block must have been almost 2 meter wide and 1.1 meter deep, so must have been over 20 tons in weight. After a troubled sea and river passage to Florence, Agostino began to work on the block, roughing it out, but in December 1466, Agostino lost the commission, possibly relinquished on the death of Donatello. The block, now known as il gigante ("the giant"), was further roughed out and "spoiled" in 1476–77 by Antonio Rossellino, and then sat for 24 years being cotto ("cooked" by the weather) in the yard of the cathedral works, until Michelangelo won a new commission to carve a David, completed in 1504.

In 1473 Agostino designed the outer facade of the Porta di San Pietro in the city walls of Perugia, in a style influenced by Leon Battista Alberti. Other works are at Amelia and at the National Gallery of Umbria at Perugia. He died in about 1481 in Perugia.

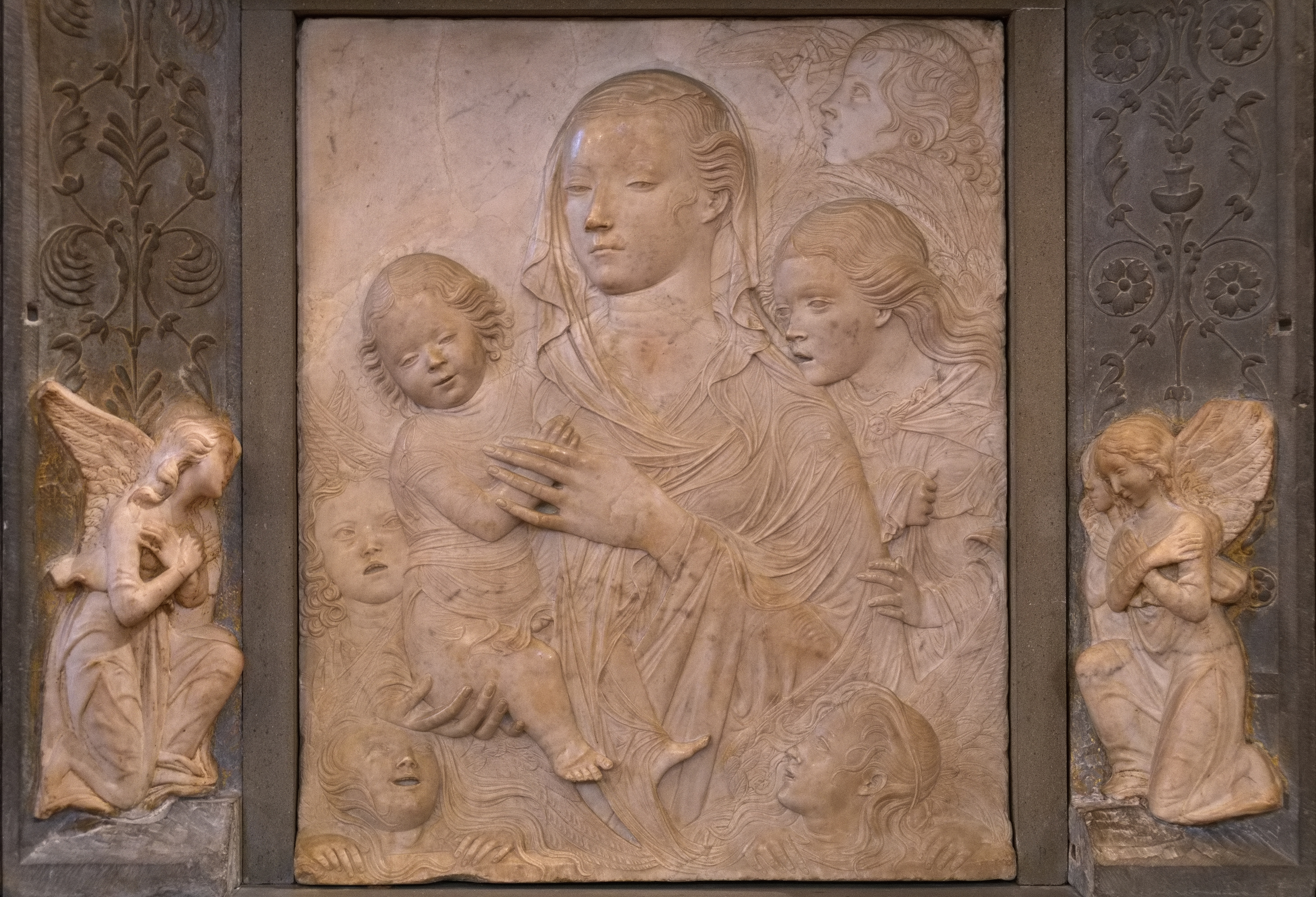
Madonna and Child with Angels, 1463–70, Bargello, Florence

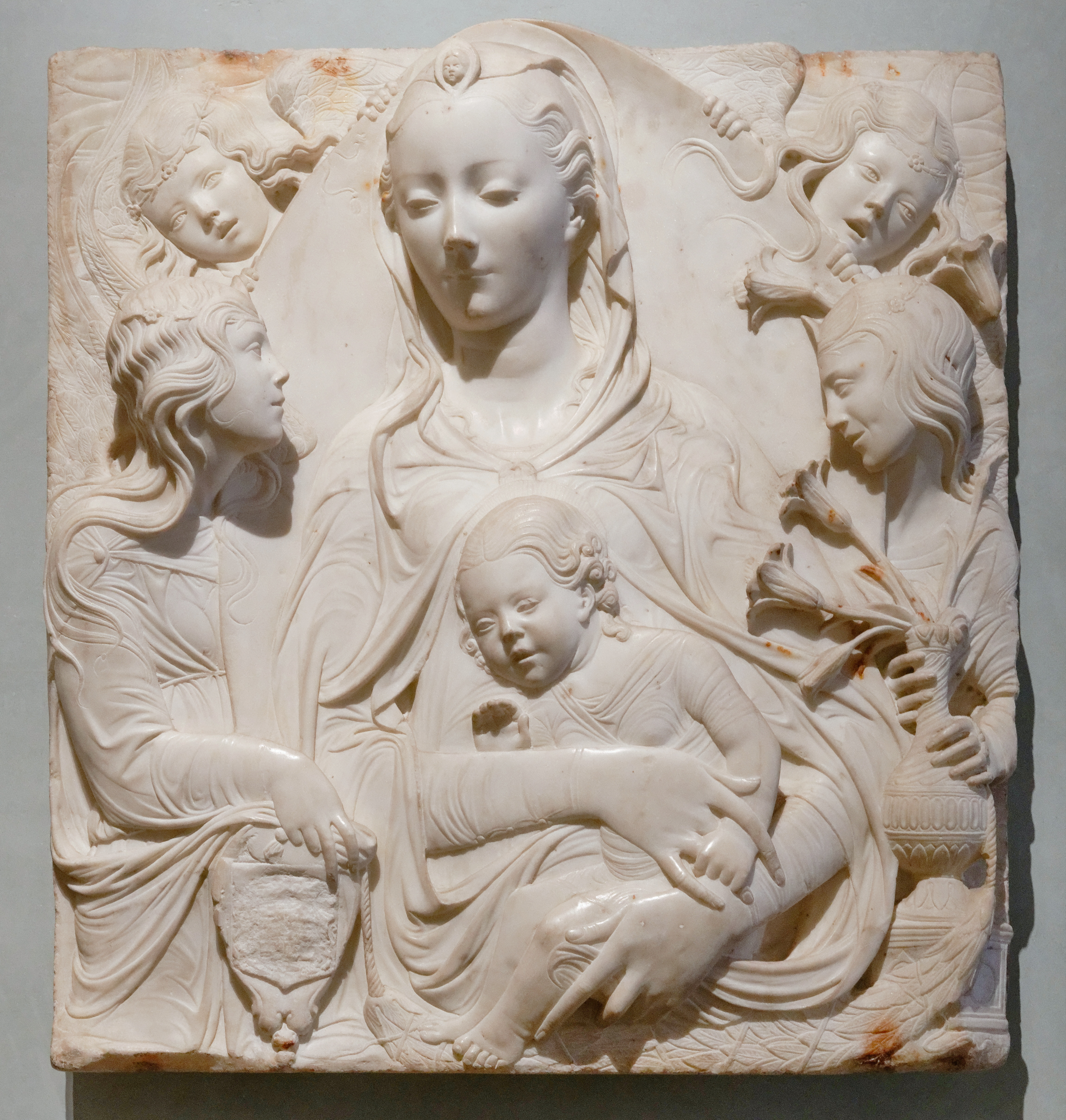
Madonna of Auvilliers, ca. 1464–69, Louvre, Paris

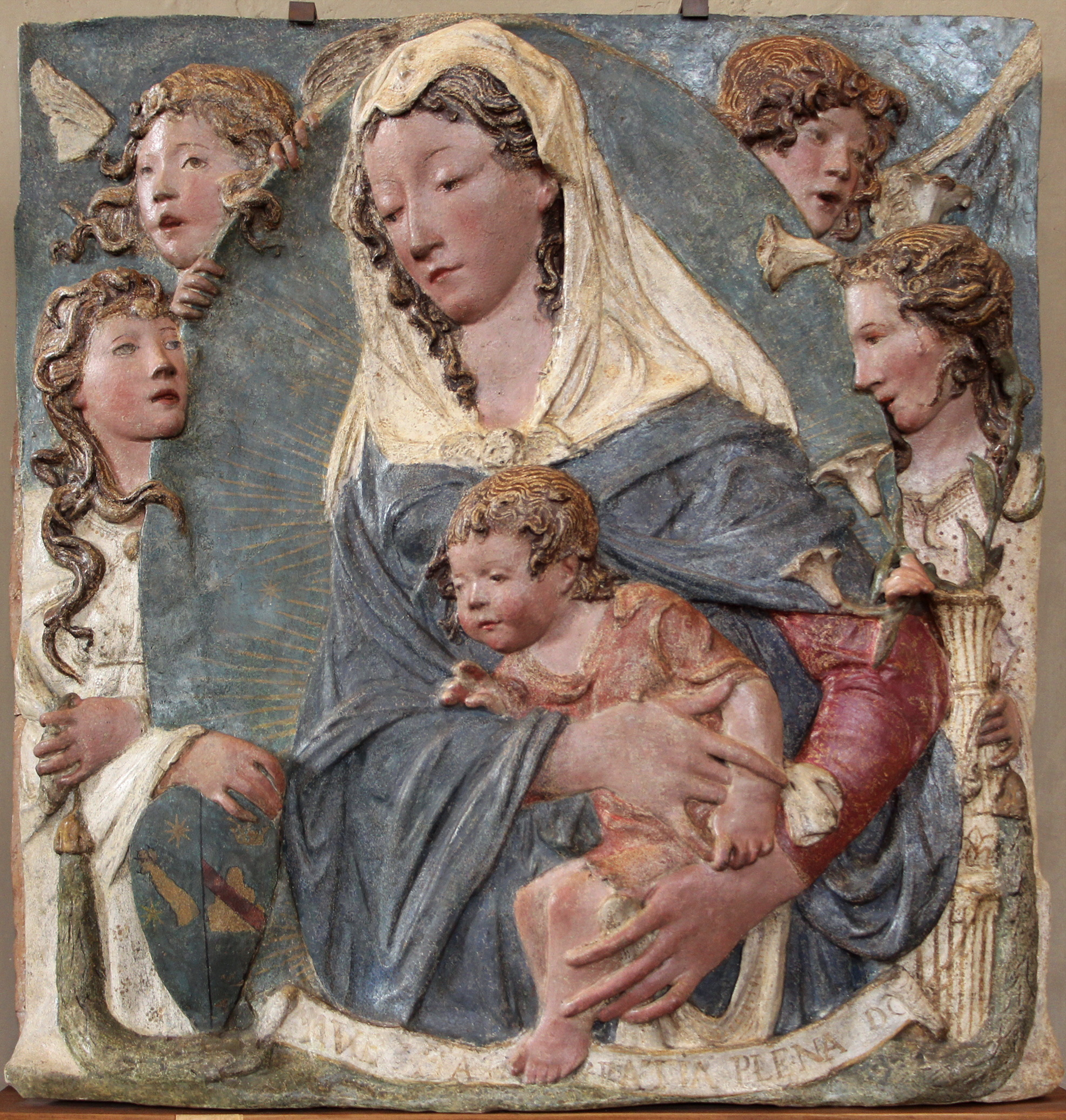
Polychromed Madonna and Child with Angels, ca. 1465

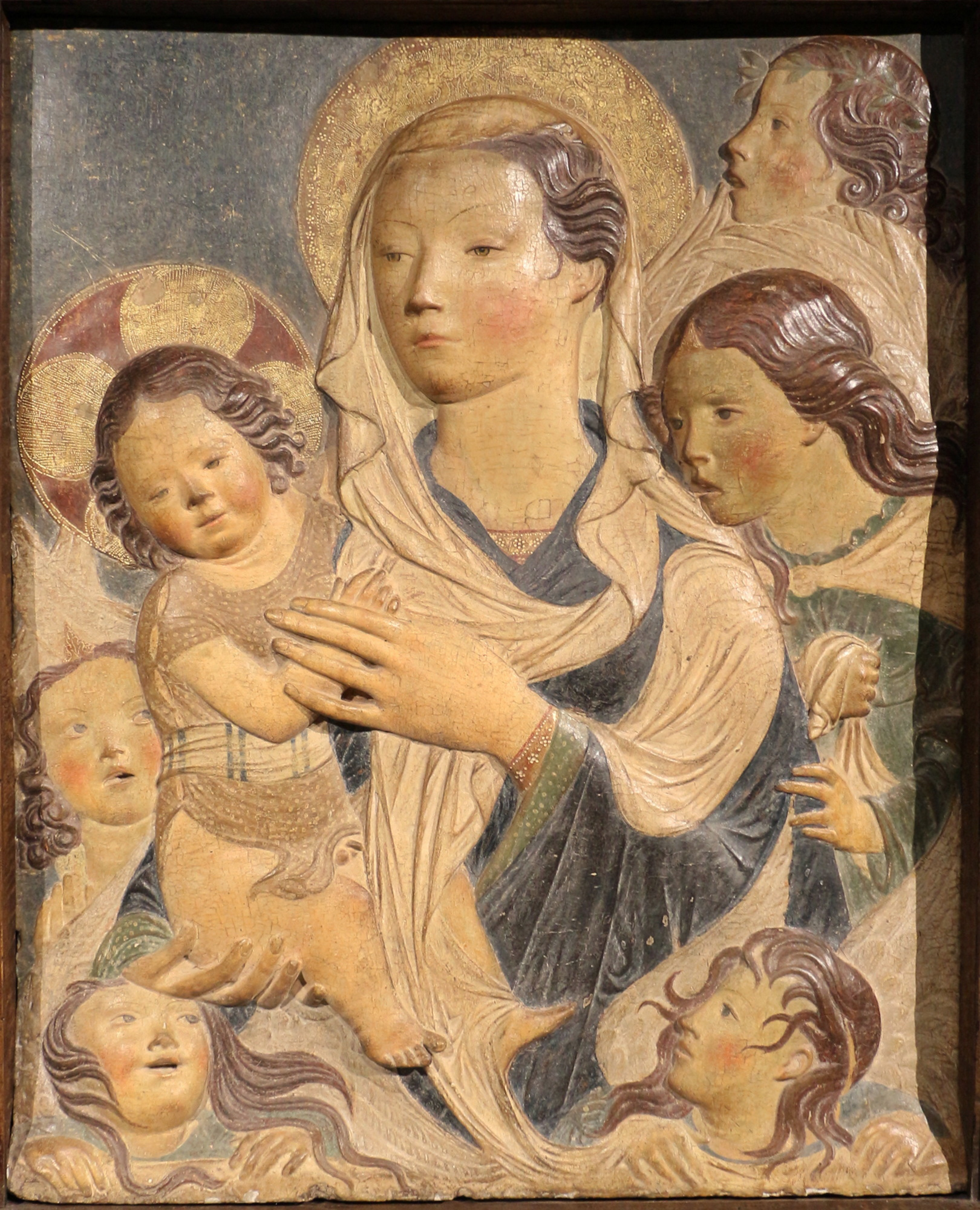
Madonna and Child with Angels of Annunciation, private coll.
