= Sigismondo Pandolfo Malatesta =

Italian nobleman and condottiero (1417–1468)

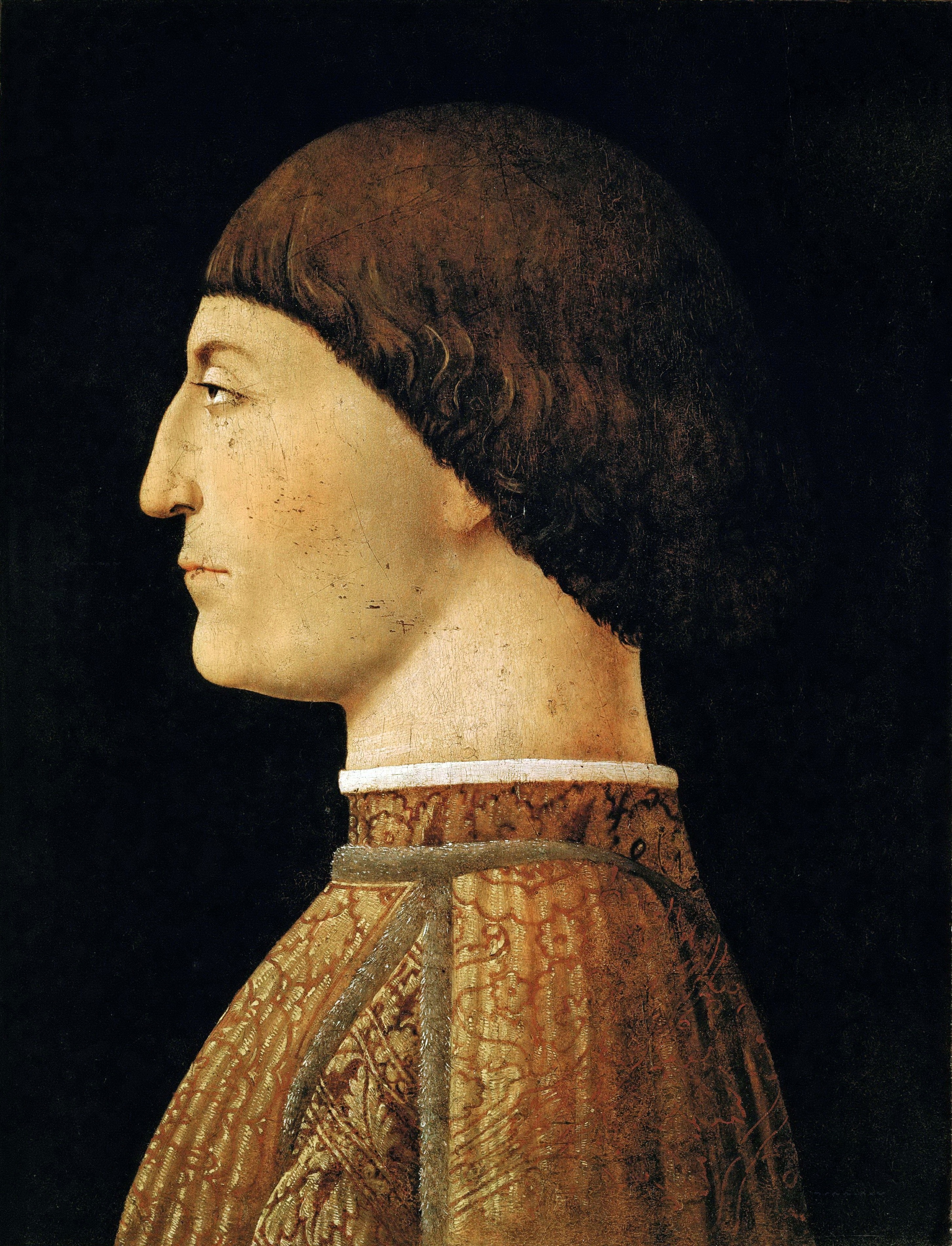
- Portrait of Sigismondo Pandolfo Malatesta by Piero della Francesca
- Born: June 19, 1417; Brescia
- Died: October 7, 1468 (aged 51); Castel Sismondo
- Known for: Military leadership, Patron of the arts
- Children: Galeotto Roberto Novello (1438, son of Ginevra d'Este); Giovanna (1444, daughter of Polissena Sforza); Roberto (1441, son of Vannetta dei Toschi); Sallustio (1450, son of Isotta degli Atti)
- Parents: Pandolfo III Malatesta (father); Antonia da Barignani (mother)
- Relatives: Galeotto Roberto Malatesta (Half-brother); Domenico (Brother); Galeotto Roberto (Brother)

Sigismondo Pandolfo Malatesta (19 June 1417 – 7 October 1468) was an Italian condottiero and nobleman, a member of the House of Malatesta and lord of Rimini and Fano from 1432. He commanded the Venetian forces in the 1465 campaign against the Ottoman Empire. He was also a poet and patron of the arts.

== Biography ==
Sigismondo Pandolfo was born in Brescia, northern Italy, the elder of the two illegitimate sons of Pandolfo III Malatesta and Antonia da Barignani. His younger brother Domenico, known as Malatesta Novello, was born in Brescia on 5 August 1418. An elder (and also illegitimate) half-brother, Galeotto Roberto Malatesta, born in 1411, was the issue of the relationship of their father Pandolfo III with Allegra de' Mori.

Following the family's tradition, after the death of his father Sigismondo debuted as man-at-arms at the age of 13 against his relative Carlo II Malatesta, lord of Pesaro and Pope Martin V's ally, who aimed to annex Rimini, Cesena and Fano to his territories. After his victory, Sigismondo obtained, together with his brothers Galeotto Roberto and Domenico, the title of Papal vicar for those cities. In 1431, though having inferior forces, he repelled another invasion by the Malatestas of Pesaro. When, soon afterwards, his elder brother abdicated, he became lord of Rimini, at the age of 15.

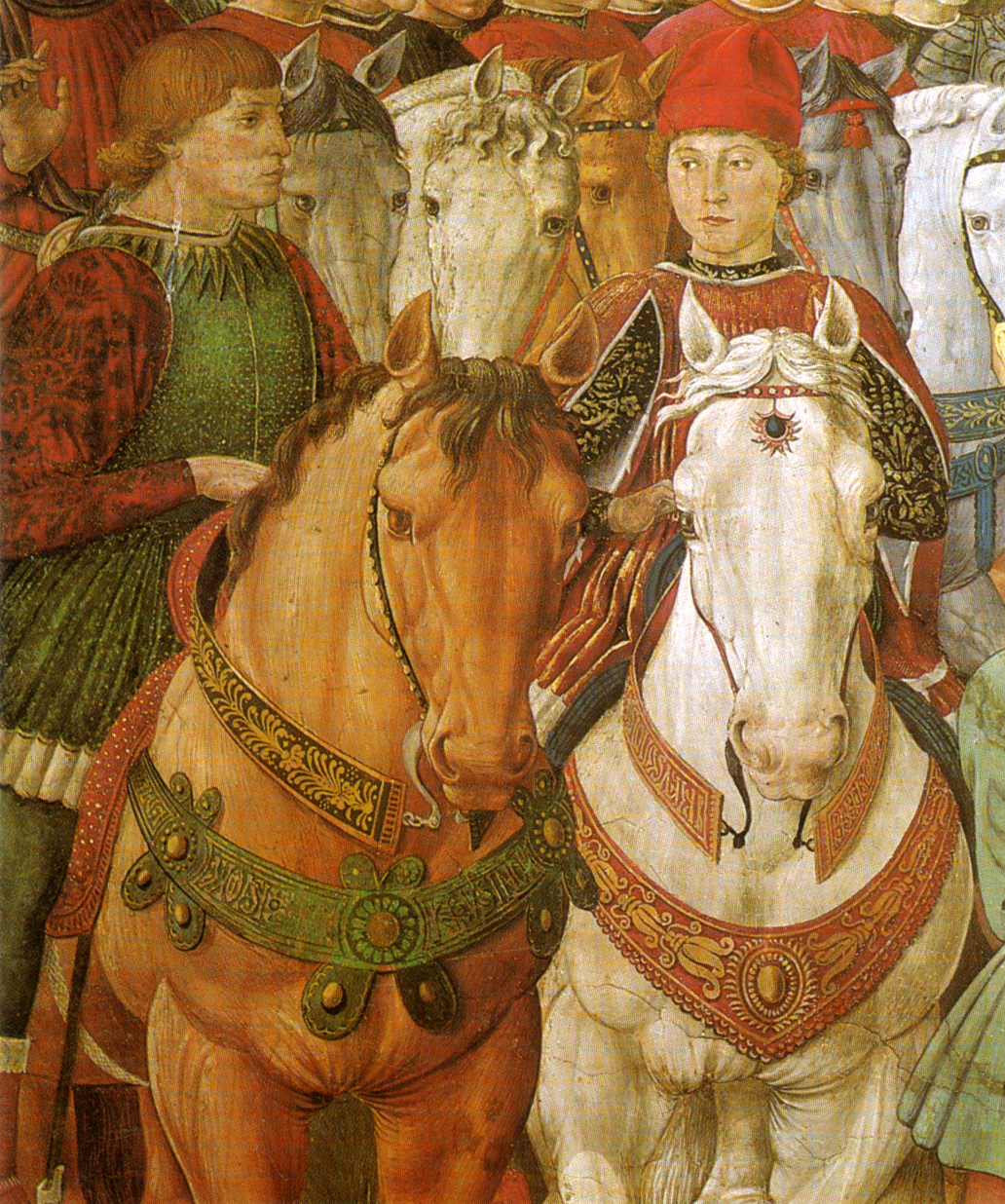
Fresco with Galeazzo Maria Sforza (right), by Benozzo Gozzoli

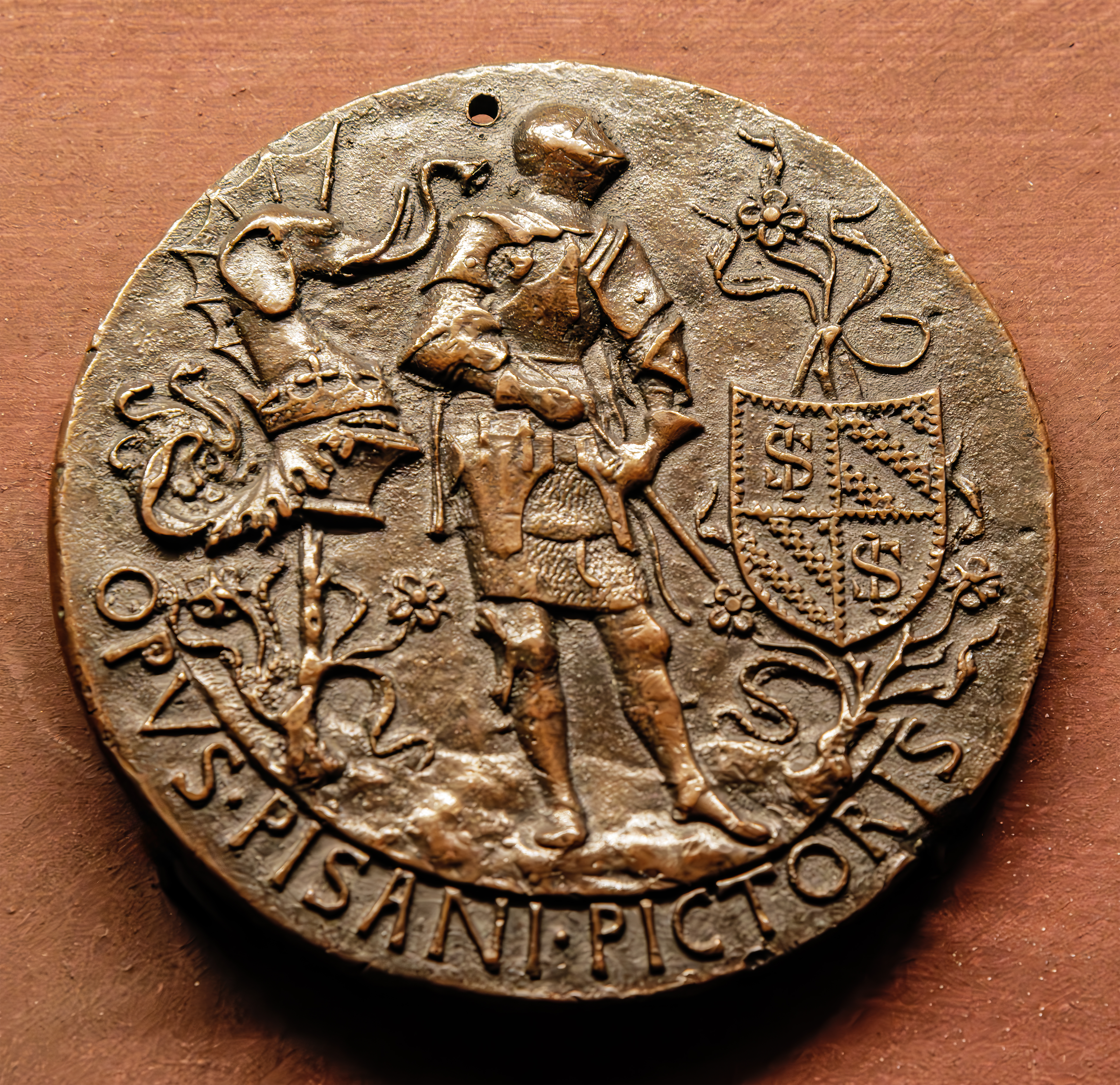
Sigismund in armor by Pisanello - Museo Correr

In 1432 he accepted the command of a papal corps, defeating the Spanish condottiero Sante Cirillo and thwarting Antonio I Ordelaffi's attempt to capture Forlì (1435–36). However, the following year Sigismondo occupied the papal city of Cervia and was excommunicated; he was soon pardoned and created commander of the papal army. Later he fought in Romagna and the Marche alongside Francesco Sforza. In the meantime, in 1434 he married his niece Ginevra d'Este, Niccolò III's legitimate daughter by his second wife Parisina Malatesta, first cousin of Sigismondo; they had one son, Galeotto Roberto Novello, who died as an infant, in 1438. On 12 October 1440, Ginevra died, and rumours spread that she had been poisoned by Sigismondo. Two years later he married Polissena Sforza, Francesco I's illegitimate daughter; they had two children: a son, Galeotto, born in 1442 and who only lived a few months, and a daughter, Giovanna, born in 1444 and later Duchess of Camerino by marriage. In this period he fought several times against the other condottiero Niccolò Piccinino: first, in 1437, as a Venetian commander, he was defeated at Calcinara sull'Oglio. Later, while defending his lands from the papal invasion army led by Piccinino, Federico III da Montefeltro and Malatesta Novello, he crushed them at Monteluro, managing to obtain some territories of Pesaro, although the latter was successfully defeated by Federico's forces.

In his restlessness, he betrayed Sforza twice, but he also betrayed his momentary ally against him, Niccolò Piccinino. Enmity against Sforza turned into true hatred when his father-in-law bought the signory of Pesaro from Carlo Malatesta. Therefore, Sigismondo allied with Pope Eugene IV and the Sforza duke of Milan. Later, he was hired by King Alfonso V of Naples, but soon afterwards received money for a condotta to be spent in the service of Florence against Alfonso. In 1445 he forced the Neapolitans to raise the siege of Piombino in Tuscany.

In 1449 his second wife Polissena died under mysterious circumstances. Francesco Sforza claimed that Sigismondo had her drowned by one of his servants, but this has remained unconfirmed. During his two marriages, he had numerous mistresses, but only two were well known: Vannetta dei Toschi, who bore him a son, Roberto, in 1441, and Isotta degli Atti, who bore him four children: Giovanni (who died in infancy), Margherita (later wife of Carlo di Fortebraccio), Sallustio and Antonia (later the first wife of Rodolfo Gonzaga, Lord of Castiglione delle Stiviere, who beheaded her in 1483 when she was discovered in adultery).

After 1449 Malatesta served variously under Venice, Florence, Siena, Naples and Sforza himself. The Peace of Lodi (1454), from which he was excluded, pushed the major Italian powers against him. His territories were repeatedly invaded by Aragonese, Venetian and Papal troops. In 1456 Sigismondo married Isotta degli Atti, his long-time mistress, and legitimized their three surviving children; the only son, Sallustio, was declared his heir. On 25 December 1460, a famous trial in absentia was held in Rome against Sigismondo. Pope Pius II, who considered him guilty of treachery towards Siena arising from his long-running feud with Federico da Montefeltro, Duke of Urbino, excommunicated him, declaring him a heretic and attributing to Sigismondo a series of sins (incest, sodomy against his son Roberto and others) which smeared his reputation for centuries. In a unique ceremony, he was canonized into Hell with the curse, "No mortal heretofore has descended into Hell with the ceremony of canonization. Sigi shall be the first deemed worthy of such honour."

Malatesta's image was publicly burnt in Rome, and a de facto crusade was then launched against him, in a league including the pope, the king of Naples, the Duke of Milan and Federico da Montefeltro. He defeated the first contingent of Papal troops, led by Napoleone Orsini, on 2 July 1461 at Castelleone di Suasa. In 1462 he was able to take Senigallia, but was forced to flee to Fano after the arrival of Federico da Montefeltro. The latter followed and severely crushed him on 12 August 1462 near Senigallia at the mouth of the Cesano. The war ended in 1463, due to the intervention of Venice, with the loss of all Sigismondo's territories apart from Rimini and a territory of some 8 kilometres around it: both, however, were assigned to return to the Papal States after his death. He then sought greater fortune as a general for Venice in its war against the Ottomans, as a field commander in the Peloponnesus (1464–1466). The Venetians granted him a contingent of 150 men to defend Rimini and his other lands during his absence.

In an attempt to reverse this situation, Sigismondo appears to have intended to murder Pius' successor, Pope Paul II (who had asked him to exchange Rimini for Spoleto and Camerino), in 1468, but he lost his nerve and returned to Rimini. He died in his residence of Castel Sismondo a few months later.

He was succeeded by his legitimated son and heir Sallustio, under the regency of his mother Isotta; but one year later (1469) his illegitimate son Roberto, also a skilled condottiero, managed briefly to maintain control over Rimini.

== Reputation, patron of art ==
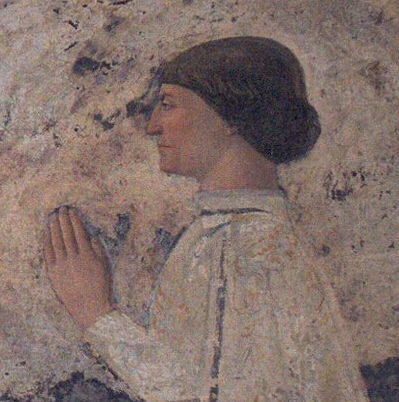
Sigismondo Malatesta, fresco by Piero della Francesca.

Sigismondo's valour and skill as a general were widely recognized by his contemporaries. According to the Catholic Encyclopedia:

From his childhood he was a skilful and daring soldier, and throughout his life was regarded as almost the first captain in Italy.

He was not a religious man, and his Tempio Malatestiano, also known as San Francesco, built in Rimini, by Leon Battista Alberti and decorated by artists including Piero della Francesca and Agostino di Duccio, was essentially a lay monument to Isotta degli Atti, his lover and third wife. It was a landmark Renaissance building, being the first church to use the Roman triumphal arch as part of its structure. Sigismondo also built a notable series of fortifications in his Romagna possessions, including the Rocche ("Castles") of Rimini and Fano.

Malatesta's reputation was largely based on Pius II's perception of him, although numerous contemporary chronicles described him as a tyrant and a womanizer: he delved into "rape, adultery, and incest". Italian Renaissance historian Francesco Guicciardini defined him "enemy of every peace and well-living". His deeds and political manoeuvers were characterized by all the play of violence, intrigues and subtleties typical of Renaissance Italy; however, Sigismondo was well aware of his sins, and tried to justify them in a series of love sonnets dedicated to Isotta.

== Legacy ==
In 1906, Edward Hutton published the historical novel Sigismondo Malatesta, mostly sympathetic to its hero. It was slightly revised and reprinted under the title The Mastiff of Rimini in 1926. The title of this book may be partly responsible for the notion that Sigismondo was known as "the Wolf of Rimini" by contemporaries or indeed subsequently at any point before the 21st century when this sobriquet has gained some ground. In fact, there is no evidence for its use in his lifetime and it cannot be found in any mainstream historical or biographical text on Sigismondo predating the Internet. Though it appears in chapter four (page 112) of art historian Kenneth Clark's 1969 book "Civilisation," released to accompany the 13-part BBC series of the same name. ("...in the neighbouring state was Sigismondo Malatesta, the wolf of Rimini, who did things that even the most advanced theatrical producer would hesitate to put on the stage." Clark, 1969, p. 112)

Hutton's novel and Charles Emile Yriarte's Un condottiere au XV Siècle (1882) were among the main sources of American poet Ezra Pound's Malatesta Cantos (The Cantos 8–11), first published in 1923. These are an admiring albeit fragmentary account of Malatesta's career as a warrior, lover and patron.

Largely influenced by Pound, as well as by C. G. Jung, the critic Adrian Stokes devoted a study, The Stones of Rimini (1934), to the art created at Sigismondo's court.

Early in his writing career, E. M. Forster attempted a historical novel about Malatesta and Gemistus Pletho, but was not satisfied with the result and never published it - though he kept the manuscript and later showed it to Naomi Mitchison.

Henry de Montherlant's play Malatesta (1946) is about the end of Malatesta's life and his intrigues with Paul II.

Guy Gavriel Kay's 2019 novel A Brightness Long Ago is a historical fantasy heavily inspired by the feud between Malatesta and Federico di Montefeltro.

== Notes ==
Preceded by Galeotto Roberto Malatesta	Lord of Rimini; 1432–1468	Succeeded by Sallustio Malatesta
