= Malatesta =

Malatesta may refer to:

== People ==
- House of Malatesta, an Italian family which ruled over Rimini from the thirteenth to the fifteenth century

=== Given name ===
- Malatesta (I) da Verucchio (1212–1312), founder of the powerful Italian Malatesta family and a famous condottiero
- Malatesta II Malatesta, best known as Guastafamiglia (c. 1299–1364), Italian condottiero and lord of Rimini.
- Malatesta III Malatesta or Malatesta IV Malatesta (also known as Malatesta dei Sonetti); (1370–1429), Italian condottiero, poet and lord
- Malatesta IV Baglioni (1491–1531), Italian condottiero and lord of Perugia, Bettona, Spello and other lands in Umbria

=== Surname ===
- Antonia Malatesta of Cesena, daughter (or possibly the niece) of Carlo I Malatesta, Lord of Cesena, Fano, Pesaro, and Rimini
- Carlo I Malatesta (1368–1429), Italian condottiero
- Enrico Malatesta (born 1976), Italian goalkeeper for Cremonese
- Errico Malatesta (1853–1932), Italian anarchist
- Guido Malatesta (1919–1970), Italian film director and screenwriter
- Malatestino Malatesta (died 1317) or Malatestino (II) Malatesta, known as dell'Occhio, lord of Pesaro and Rimini
- Malatesta II Malatesta, best known as Guastafamiglia (c. 1299–1364), Italian condottiero and lord of Rimini.
- Malatesta IV Malatesta (also known as Malatesta dei Sonetti); (1370–1429), Italian condottiero, poet and lord
- Paola Malatesta (1393–1449), Italian noblewoman
- Paolo Malatesta (1246–1285), Italian nobleman
- Sigismondo Pandolfo Malatesta (1417–1468), Italian nobleman and poet
- Simone Malatesta (born 1982), Italian footballer for Lupa Roma

== Other ==
- Malatesta (play), a play by Henry de Montherlant
- Malatesta (film), a 1970 German film
- Malatesta (Rome Metro), underground station of Line C of the Rome Metro
