= Ramberto Malatesta =

Ramberto Malatesta (died January 1330) was a son of Giovanni Malatesta and his second wife Zambrasina dei Zambrasi, and brother of the Archpriest Guido Malatesta.

Around 1323, Ramberto was approached by his cousin Uberto, Count of Giaggolo and invited into a conspiracy to overthrow their uncle Pandolfo I Malatesta, Lord of Rimini and head of the Malatesta family. But Uberto da Giaggolo was the son of the Paolo Maletesta, who was murdered by Ramberto's father in a bout of jealousy back in 1285. Pretending to play along, Ramberto arranged for a banquet in his home for the conspirators, and then fell upon and killed Uberto.

At the death of Pandolfo I in 1326, the succession to the Malatesta dominions was partitioned between Ramberto's cousins, Malatesta II 'Guastafamiglia' getting Pesaro and Ferrantino 'di Malatestino' receiving Rimini, leaving Ramberto out in the cold.

But Ramberto was not a man to be ignored. In July 1326, shortly after the succession, Ramberto arranged for another banquet at his home in Rimini, inviting his cousins and their families. Alas, Malatesta II himself was unable to attend, foiling Ramberto's plans for what was likely to be a family mass murder. Ramberto opted for the half-measure of releasing the members of Malatesta II's family, and imprisoning only Ferrantino's family, hoping Malatesta II could be persuaded to join him in the conspiracy. It is possible Malatesta II contemplated it. But Polentisana da Polenta, wife of Ferrantino's son Malatestino Novello, rallied the people of Rimini and appealed to her own Polentani family, in an effort to release her husband from Ramberto's clutches. Malatesta II entered Rimini with his army, and forced the captives' release. Ramberto escaped to his countryside castles.

In 1327, Cardinal Pouget managed to reconcile Ramberto with the rest of the Malatesta. But the very next year, Ramberto and his brother the Archpriest Guido conspired with the exiled Parcitadi family, long-time enemies of the Malatesta, in an assault on Rimini. Once again it failed, and once again a reconciliation was negotiated.

But Malatestino Novello (son of Ferrantino) had had enough of Ramberto's plots and intrigues. In January 1330, he lured Ramberto on a hunting trip to his castle in Poggiano. Soon upon arrival, Ramberto fell on his knees and begged Malatestino's forgiveness for his past treacheries. Malatestino's only reply was to pull out his dagger and plunge it into Ramberto's neck, killing him instantly.

== Sources ==
- J. Larner (1965) The Lords of Romagna: Romagnol society and the origins of the Signorie, Ithaca: Cornell University Press, p. 70-71
- P. H. Wicksteed and E.G. Gardner, (1902) Dante and Giovanni del Virgilio, Westminster: Archibald Constable, p. 249
