= Francesca da Rimini (Zandonai) =

Italian 20th century opera

- Opera by Riccardo Zandonai
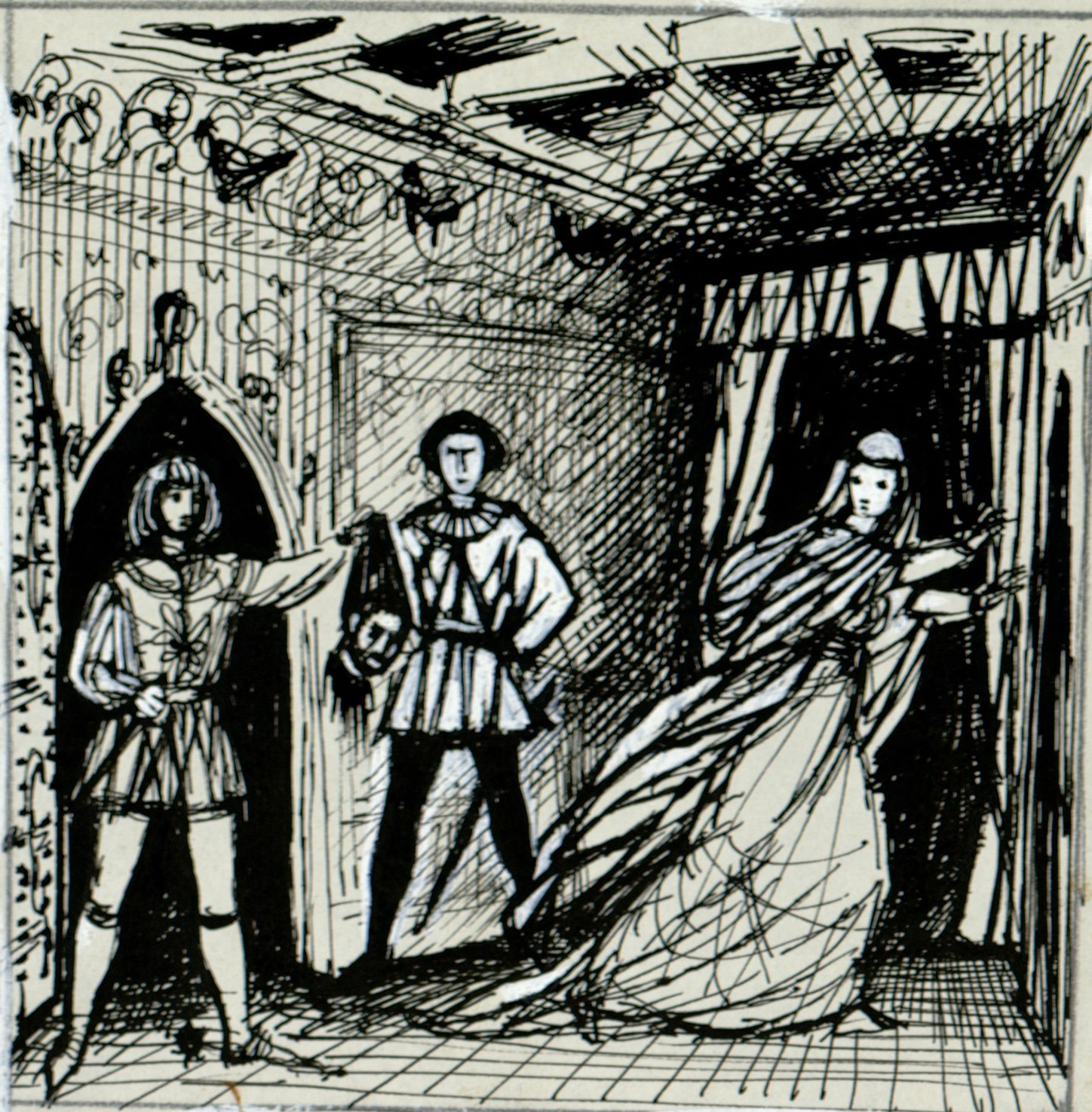
- Sketch for a set design (undated)
- Librettist: Tito Ricordi
- Language: Italian
- Based on: Gabriele D'Annunzio's Francesca da Rimini
- Premiere: 19 February 1914; Teatro Regio, Turin

Francesca da Rimini, Op. 4, is an opera in four acts, composed by Riccardo Zandonai, with a libretto by Tito Ricordi II, after D'Annunzio's play Francesca da Rimini. It was premiered at the Teatro Regio in Turin on 19 February 1914 and is still staged occasionally.

This opera is Zandonai's best-known work. In the New Grove Dictionary of Opera, Renato Chiesa calls it "one of the most original and polished Italian melodramas of the 20th century, [which] combines a powerful gift for Italian melody ... with an exceptional command of orchestration." Celebrated performers of the title role have included Gilda dalla Rizza, Magda Olivero (who recorded excerpts from the opera in 1969, for Decca Records), Raina Kabaivanska and Renata Scotto.

== Roles ==
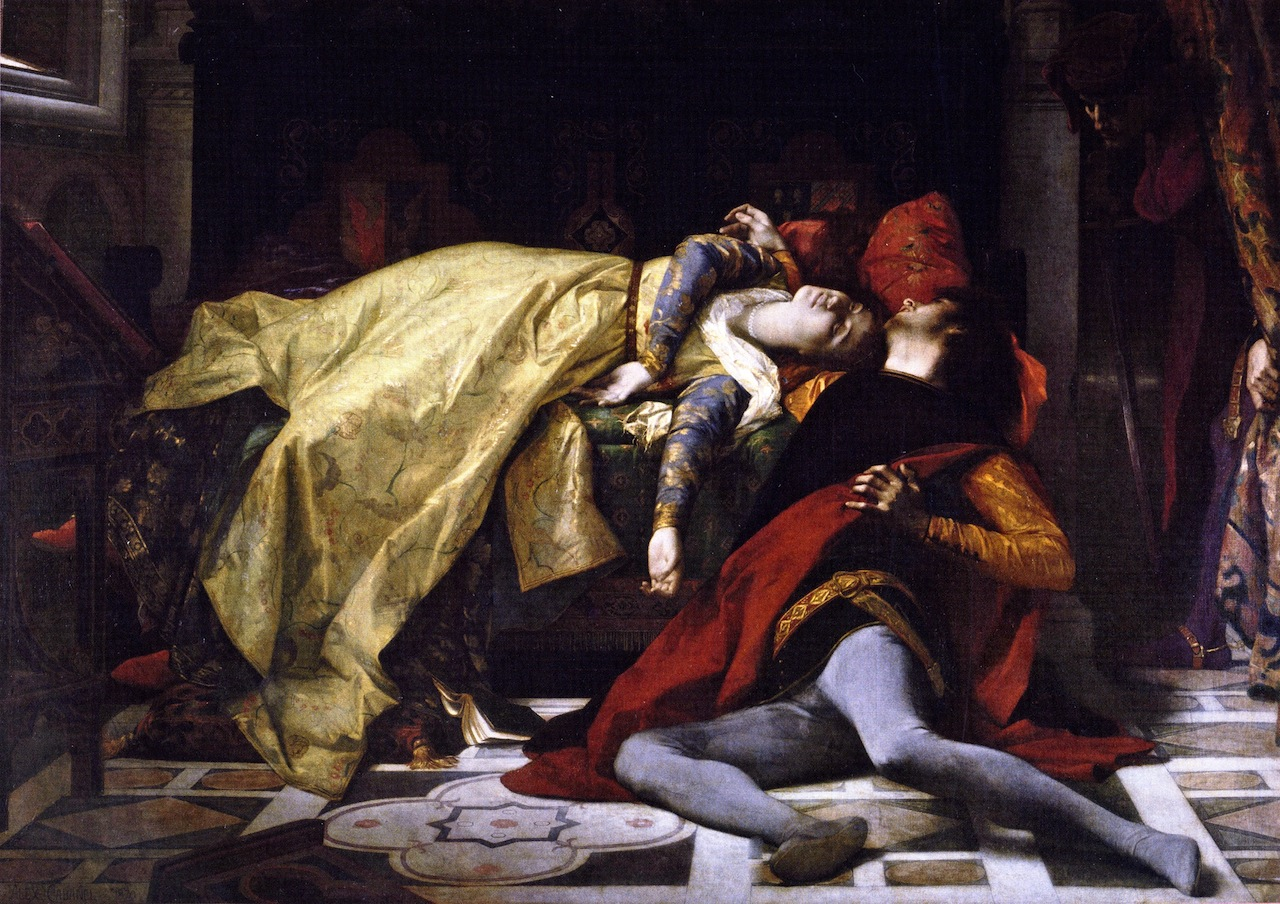
The Death of Francesca da Rimini and Paolo Malatesta, Alexandre Cabanel, c. 1870

Roles, voice types, premiere cast
| Role | Voice type | Premiere cast, 19 February 1914 Conductor: Ettore Panizza |
|---|---|---|
| Francesca da Rimini | soprano | Linda Cannetti |
| Paolo il Bello | tenor | Giulio Crimi |
| Giovanni lo Sciancato | baritone | Francesco Cigada |
| Malatestino dall'Occhio | tenor | Giordano Paltrinieri |
| Samaritana | soprano | Raquelita Merly |
| Donella | mezzo-soprano | Maria Vaccari |
| Garsenda | soprano | Maria Avezza |
| Biancofiore | soprano | Marina Polazzi |
| Altichiara | mezzo-soprano | Maria Marek |
| La Schiava (Smaragdi) | contralto | Gabriella Besanzoni |
| Il Balestriere | tenor | Giuseppe Nessi |
| Il Giullare | bass | Pompilio Malatesta |
| Ostasio | bass | Osvaldo Pellegrini |
| Ser Toldo Berardengo | tenor | Edmondo Orlandi |
| Il Torrigiano | baritone | Osvaldo Pellegrini |
| Voce del Prigioniero | tenor | |

== Synopsis ==
The story takes place in Ravenna and Rimini.

Francesca, daughter of Guido I da Polenta, for state reasons, is to be married to Giovanni, known as Gianciotto, the malformed son of Malatesta da Verucchio. But as Francesca would certainly refuse to marry the lame and deformed Gianciotto, she is introduced in the first act, by means of a well-laid plot, to his handsome younger brother, Paolo, known as Il bello. Under the impression that Paolo is her destined bridegroom, Francesca falls deeply in love with him at first sight; he also falls passionately in love with her, although they do not exchange a single word.

The next act takes place on the platform of a tower of the Malatesti, while a battle rages between the Guelphs and Ghibellines. Francesca, now married to Gianciotto, meets Paolo and reproaches him for the fraud practised on her. He begs forgiveness and reveals his intense passion for her. Gianciotto brings the news of Paolo's election as Captain of the People and Commune of Florence. Paolo departs for Florence.

In the third act Francesca, in her luxurious apartment, is reading the story of Lancelot and Guinevere to her women. They then dance and sing in celebration of the advent of Spring, until, on a whispered word from her slave, Francesca dismisses them. Paolo, sick with longing for her, has returned from Florence. He enters; they continue reading the story of Guinevere together, until, no longer in control of their feelings, they let their lips meet in a long kiss.

In the fourth act, Malatestino, Gianciotto's youngest brother, who himself lusts for Francesca, has discovered her secret meetings with Paolo. After Francesca refuses to give in to his sexual advances, Malatestino betrays Francesca and Paolo to Gianciotto, who determines to find out the truth for himself. Accordingly, Gianciotto lies in wait outside Francesca's door, and surprising her and Paolo together at early dawn, he slays them both.

== Selected recordings ==
| Year | Cast: Francesca, Paolo, Gianciotto, Malatestino | Conductor, opera house and orchestra | Label |
|---|---|---|---|
| 1950 | Maria Caniglia, Giacinto Prandelli, Carlo Tagliabue, Mario Carlin | Antonio Guarnieri, RAI Roma orchestra and chorus | CD: Urania Records; Cat: WS121192 |
| 1959 | Magda Olivero, Mario Del Monaco, Giampiero Malaspina, | Gianandrea Gavazzeni, La Scala, Milan | CD: Myto; Cat: 0801439902404 |
| 1984 | Renata Scotto, Plácido Domingo, Cornell MacNeil, William Lewis | James Levine, Metropolitan Opera orchestra and chorus | DVD: Deutsche Grammophon; Cat: 00440 073 4313 |
