= Sant'Andrea di Suasa =

Town in Marche, Italy

- Frazione
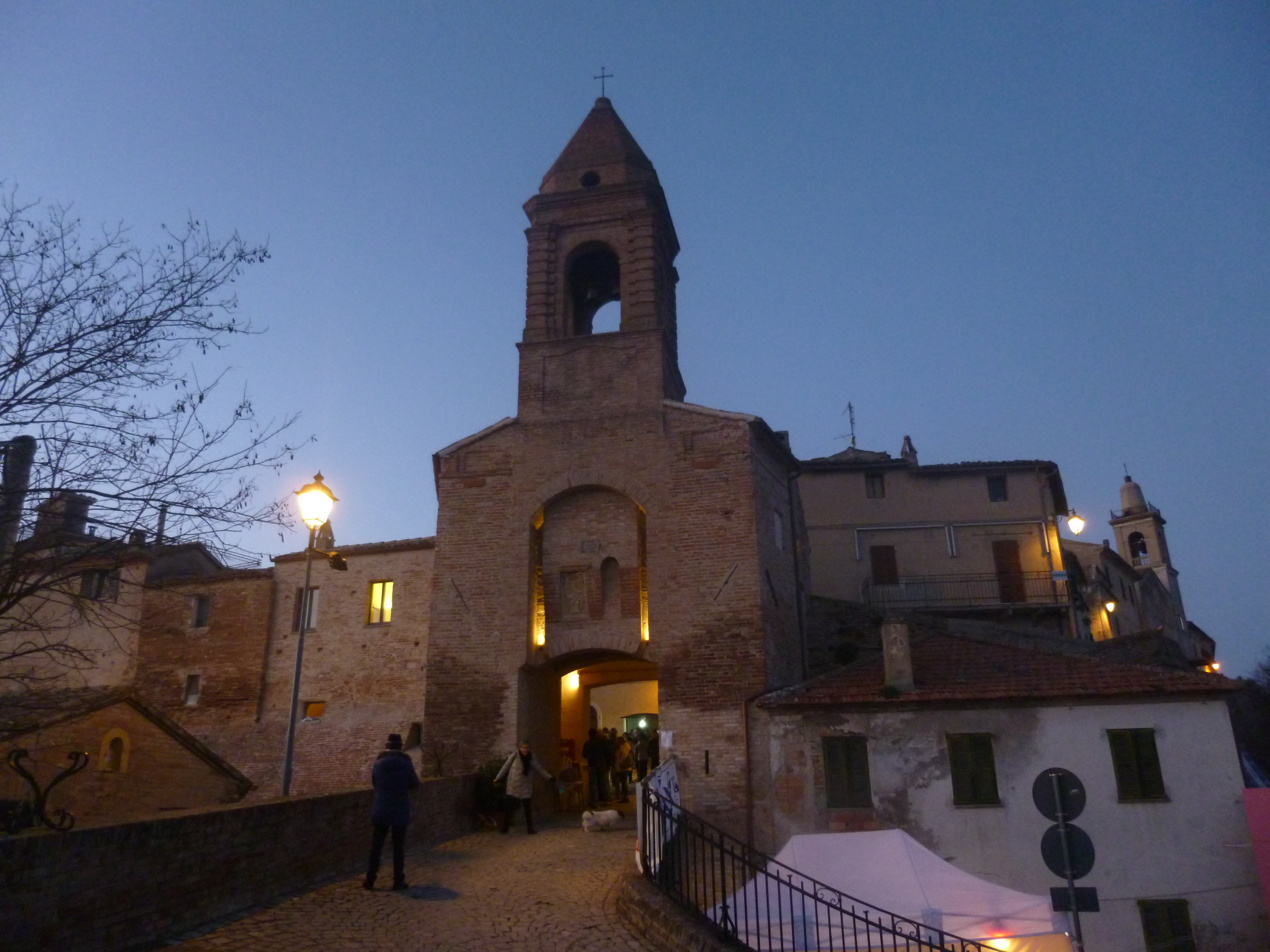
- Entrance of the castle of Sant'Andrea di Suasa

- Location of Sant'Andrea di Suasa in Italy
- Coordinates: 43.6424°N 12.9467°W
- Country: Italy
- Region: Marche
- Province: Pesaro-Urbino
- Comune: Mondavio
- Time zone: UTC+1 (CET)
  - Summer (DST): UTC+2 (CEST)

Sant'Andrea di Suasa is a hamlet of the municipality of Mondavio in the province of Pesaro-Urbino, Italy. The castle-village sits 265 metres above sea level, 23 km from the Adriatic coast and develops along the crest of a large hill to the left of the Cesano river. It is characterized by the mighty wall circuit still intact with a single arch entrance.

== Geography ==
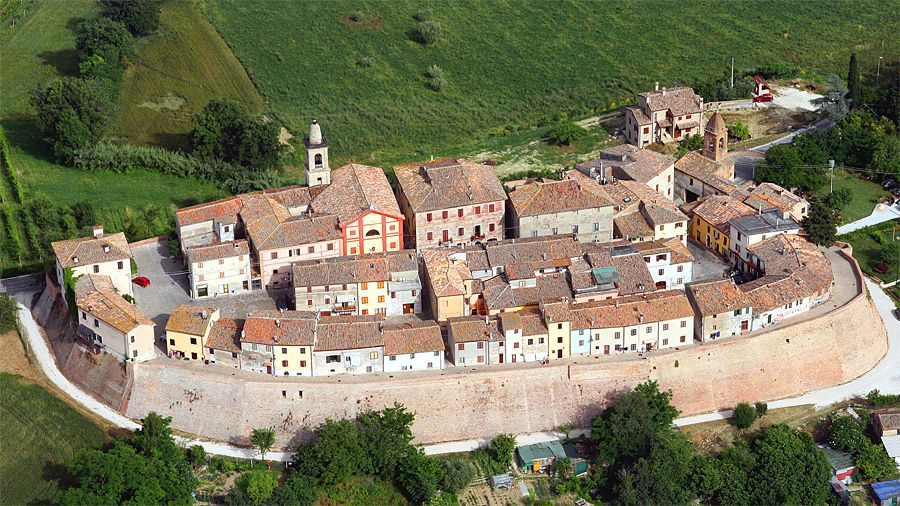
Aerial shot of Sant'Andrea di Suasa

The village is located in the Marche countryside close to the coast, and more precisely in the Cesano valley which is divided between the provinces of Ancona and Pesaro and Urbino, placed in a hilly landscape with many international tourist destinations. A few kilometers all around there are historical and architectural centers of interest due to the presence of villages, abbeys and castles, including Mondavio, Corinaldo, Pergola and Mondolfo, elected among the "Borghi più belli d'Italia" (most beautiful villages of Italy) and many others.

The town is about 50 km away from Urbino, Jesi, the caves of Frasassi, Senigallia and the Conero coast.

Typical products of the Cesano valley are the "Frattula" salami, the "Suasa" onion and many DOC wines as: Verdicchio dei Castelli di Jesi DOC, Rosso Conero DOC, Bianchello del Metauro DOC, Colli Pesaresi DOC, Pergola DOC.

The municipal area (Mondavio) is awarded the orange flag for tourism-environmental quality by the Italian Touring Club.

== History ==
The origins of the castle of Sant'Andrea di Suasa are linked to Suasa, a settlement of possible Greek or Etruscan foundation, then certainly occupied by the "Senones" Gauls and finally became a Roman municipium. Following the destruction of Suasa by Alaric, king of the Visigoths in 409 AD, its population moved to the surrounding hills, founding several fortified towns, which later became villages or municipalities. Even today Sant'Andrea and Castellone retain the toponym "di Suasa" in honor of the city that generated them.

The urban development of Sant'Andrea di Suasa is due to the advent of Christianity and in particular with the arrival of the Benedictine monks, who first founded the nearby monastery of San Lorenzo in Campo and cleared and cultivated the entire Cesano valley, restoring order and prosperity to the territory worn out by the continuous wars between germanic people and the Byzanthine empire. The monastery of S. Andrea is mentioned, together with that of S. Lorenzo, for the first time in the Breviarium Ecclesiae Ravennatis of the ninth century, while the birth of "Castrum Sancti Andreae" is attributed to the second half of the tenth century. In fact, the construction of the walls is attributable to around the year 1100, erected by the monks to face the new wars that followed the death of Charlemagne between the Holy Roman Empire and the papal states.

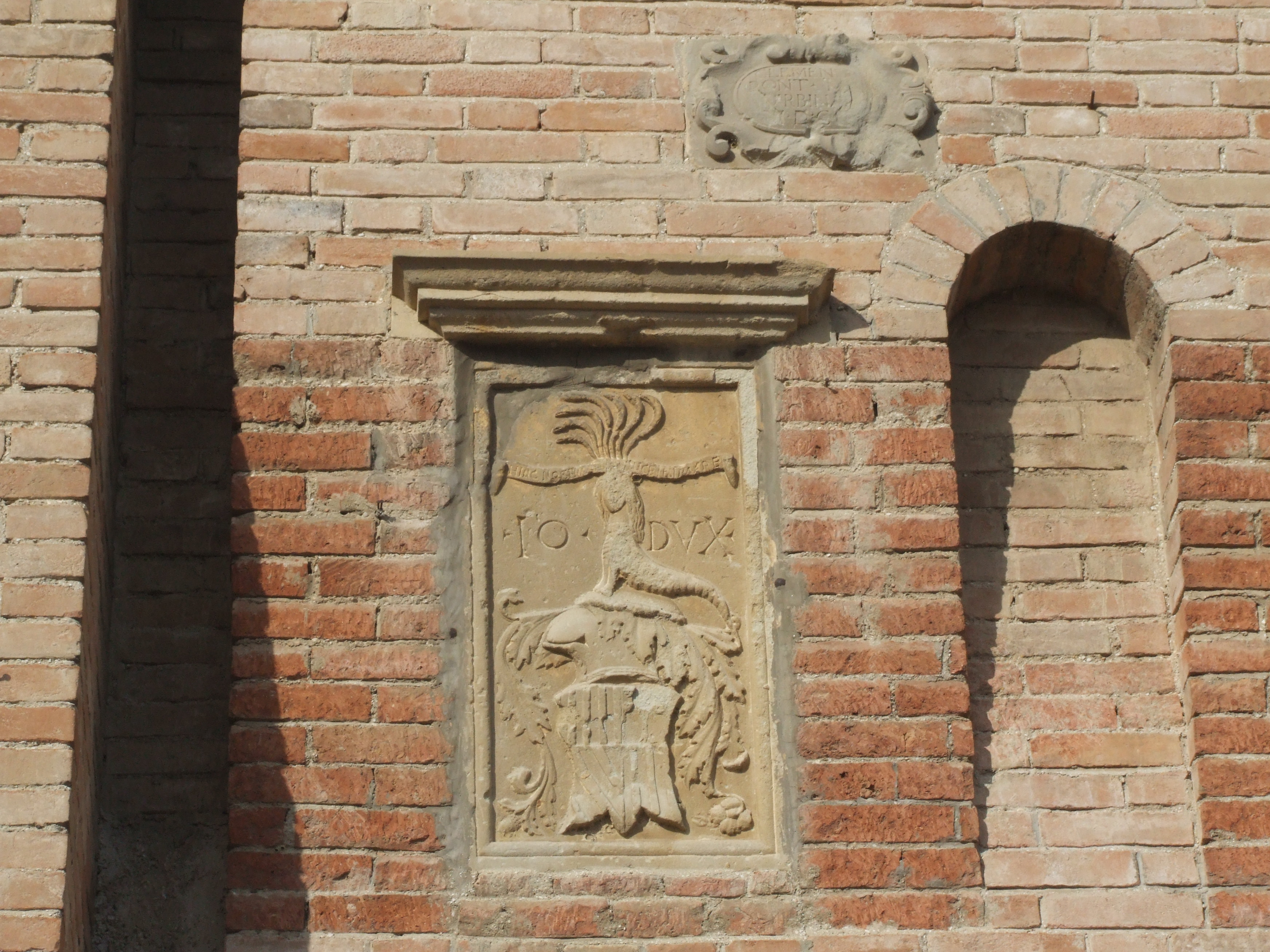
Coat of arms of Giovanni Della Rovere at the entrance to the castle

The first church was built by the Benedictine monks and, although dedicated to S. Maria della Neve, it was called "Chiesa della Penna" because it was built on the highest part of the castle. This church, which also housed a crypt, was finally demolished in 1920.

In 1150 Sant'Andrea was autonomous enough to have a Prior and a Notary, but in a document that until 1645 was in the archive of the Monastery of San Lorenzo, mentioned by Annibaldi degli Abbati Olivieri, in his unpublished "Spogli d'Archivio" preserved in the State Archives of Florence, there is a parchment donation instrument drawn up on May 8 1193 by the hand of a certain Orazio "Notaro di S. Andrea" in the County of Fano. It can therefore be deduced that in that period Sant'Andrea fell under the jurisdiction of the Fano county.

In 1303 the city of Fano and the nearby Vicariate of Mondavio were occupied by Pandolfo Malatesta and Ferrantino Malatesta. In 1316 Sant'Andrea was occupied by the troops of Fabriano marching against Senigallia, while in 1322 the territory entered the sphere of Pope John XXII for then to return in 1343 again in the Malatesta domination with Galeotto Malatesta.

In 1463 the castle was in danger of being destroyed when it became part of the domain of Duke Giovanni Della Rovere. After an occupation by Cesare Borgia in 1498, it returned to the Della Rovere family in 1508 through the legacy of Guidobaldo da Montefeltro. The municipality of Sant'Andrea di Suasa swore allegiance to him on November 8 1520. In 1631 the duchy of Urbino was devolved to the Holy See and Sant'Andrea di Suasa became part of the Legation of Urbino and Pesaro.

Around 1500 a hospital was created in the municipality and construction of the new "Parish Church of Sant'Andrea" begin, inaugurated only in 1612. Starting from 1597 we have track of all the military commanders who were entrusted with the defense of the castle.

With the unification of Italy the town officially became part of the province of Pesaro-Urbino. In 1869 the municipality of Sant'Andrea di Suasa was suppressed and constituted part of the municipality of Mondavio.

== Landmarks ==
- Castle of Sant'Andrea
- Chiesa Parrocchiale di Sant'Andrea
