= Love triangle =

Romantic relationship involving three people

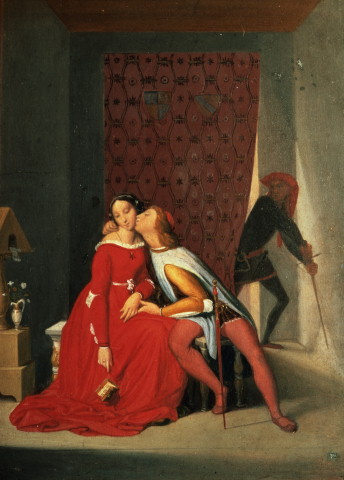
Gianciotto Discovers Paolo and Francesca by Jean Auguste Dominique Ingres

A love triangle is a scenario or circumstance, usually depicted as a rivalry, in which two people are pursuing or involved in a romantic relationship with one person, or in which one person in a romantic relationship with someone is simultaneously pursuing or involved in a romantic relationship with someone else. A love triangle typically is not conceived of as a situation in which one person loves a second person, who loves a third person, who loves the first person, or variations thereof.

Love triangles are a common narrative device in theater, literature, and film. Statistics suggest that, in Western society, "Willingly or not, most adults have been involved in a love triangle."

The 1994 book Beliefs, Reasoning, and Decision Making states, "Although the romantic love triangle is formally identical to the friendship triad, as many have noted their actual implications are quite different ... Romantic love is typically viewed as an exclusive relationship, whereas friendship is not."

== History and definition ==
The term "love triangle" generally connotes an arrangement unsuitable to one or more of the people involved. One person typically ends up feeling betrayed at some point (e.g., "Person A is jealous of Person C who is having a relationship with Person B who, in Person A's eyes, is "their person."). A similar arrangement that is agreed upon by all parties is sometimes called a triad, which is a type of polyamory even though polyamory usually implies sexual relations. Within the context of monogamy, love triangles are inherently unstable, with unrequited love and jealousy as common themes. In most cases, the jealous or rejected first party ends a friendship – and sometimes even starts a fight with – the second party over the third-party love interest. Though rare, love triangles have been known to lead to murder or suicide committed by the actual or perceived rejected lover.

Psychoanalysis has explored "the theme of erotic love triangles and their roots in the Oedipal triangle". Experience suggests that "a repeated pattern of forming or being caught in love triangles can be much dissolved by beginning to analyse the patterns of the childhood relationship to each parent in turn and to both parents as a couple". In such instances, "you find men who are attracted only by a married woman but who can't sustain the relationship if it threatens to become more than an affair. They need the husband to protect them from a full relationship...as women who repeatedly get involved with married men need the wives".

== Common themes ==
=== Eternal triangle ===
"In geometric terms, the eternal triangle can be represented as comprising three points – a jealous mate (A) in a relationship with an unfaithful partner (B) who has a lover (C) ... A feels abandoned, B is between two mates, and C is a catalyst for crisis in the union A-B".

=== Homosociality ===
It has been suggested that if men "share a sense of brotherhood and they allow a woman into their relationship, an isosceles triangle is created" automatically, as "in Truffaut's film Jules et Jim". René Girard has explored the role of envy and mimetic desire in such relationships, arguing that often the situation "subordinates a desired something to the someone who enjoys a privileged relationship with it". In such cases, 'it cannot be fair to blame the quarrel of the mimetic twins on a woman. ... She is their common scapegoat'.

=== Marital breakup ===
When a love triangle results in the breakup of a marriage, it may often be followed by what has been called "the imposition of a 'defilement taboo'...the emotional demand imposed by a jealous ex-mate...to eschew any friendly or supportive contact with the rival in the triangle". The result is often to leave children gripped by "shadows from the past...they often take sides. Their loyalties are torn", and – except in the best of cases – "the one left 'injured' can easily sway the feelings of the children against acknowledging this new relationship".

As to gender responsibility, evidence would seem to indicate that in late modernity both sexes may equally well play the part of the "Other Person" – that "men and women love with equivalent passion as well as folly" and that certainly there is nothing to "suggest that a man is better able to control himself in a love triangle than a woman". Stereotypically, the person at the center of a rivalrous love triangle is a woman, whereas for a split-object love triangle it is a man, due to the same reasons that polygyny is far more common than polyandry.

=== Distinction ===
A love triangle should not be confused with a ménage à trois, a three-way relationship in which either all members are romantically involved with each other, or one member has relations with two others who are reconciled to the situation instead of being in conflict. Ménage à trois is French and directly translates to "household for three" meaning it is usually composed of a "married couple and a lover ... who live together while sharing sexual relations". This differs from a love triangle because each participant is equally motivated purely by sexual desires. The ménage à trois may be considered a subset of "The Sandwich ... a straight three-handed operation ... which may be operated with any assortment of sexes: three men, three women, two men and a woman ('Ménage à trois'), or two women and a man ('The Tourist Sandwich')".

== In entertainment ==
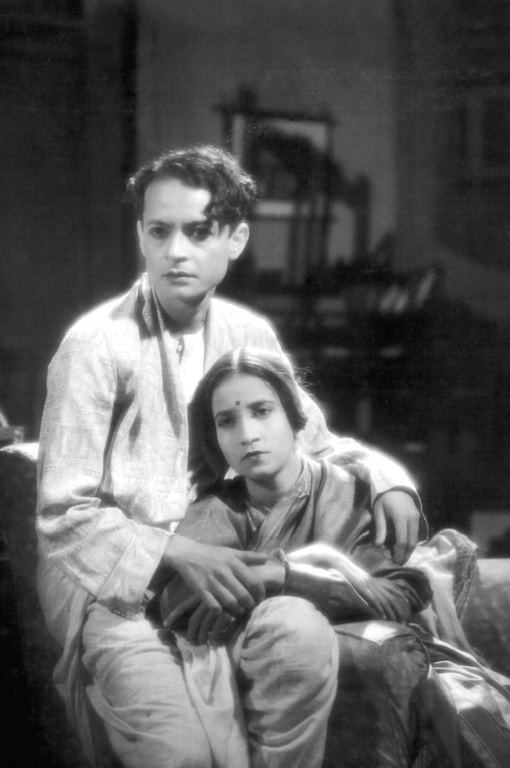
Directed by Bengali language film director Pramathesh Barua, Devdas (1935) pivots a tragic love triangle between Devdas, Parvati, and Chandramukhi.

Love triangles are a popular theme in entertainment, especially romantic fiction, including opera, romance novels, soap operas, romantic comedies, manga, tabloid talk shows, and popular music. They are a major aspect of Indian television shows.

Three of the highest grossing movies of all time adjusted for inflation (Gone with the Wind, Titanic and Doctor Zhivago) are romantic epics that feature a love triangle at its core. Young adult literature has seen a rise in the popularity of the love triangle story structure (such as Twilight or The Selection). But the love triangle story structure has been around since before early classic writers like William Shakespeare and Alexandre Dumas. Shakespeare's famous play Romeo and Juliet featured a love triangle between Juliet, Romeo, and Paris. Although more subtle, Dumas's classics The Count of Monte Cristo and The Three Musketeers also feature love triangles strong enough to seek revenge and start a war.

Bengali writer Bankim Chandra Chattopadhyay's 1865 novel Durgeshnandini also follows a love triangle between Jagat Singh (a Mughal General), Tilottama (the daughter of a Bengali feudal lord), and Ayesha (the daughter of a rebel Pathan leader against whom Jagat Singh was fighting).

In television shows, a love triangle is often prolonged, delaying final declarations of love between the pursued character and suitors that may prematurely end this dynamic or displease fans. Love triangles also featured prominently on soap operas, and can span more than a decade, as shown by Taylor Hamilton, Ridge Forrester and Brooke Logan on The Bold and the Beautiful, or between Luke Spencer, Laura Spencer, and Scotty Baldwin on General Hospital.

== See also ==
- Adultery
- Affair
- Archie Comics
- Ménage à trois
- Tennessee Waltz
- Threesome
- Triangulation (psychology)
- Unicorn hunting
- Unrequited love
