= Malatesta Malatesta =

Malatesta Malatesta may refer to:

- Malatesta da Verucchio (1212–1312) or Malatesta (I) da Verucchio, founder of the Malatesta lordship of Rimini
- Malatestino Malatesta (died 1317) or Malatestino (II) Malatesta, known as dell'Occhio, lord of Pesaro and Rimini
- Malatesta II Malatesta (c. 1299 – 1364) or Malatesta II (or III) Malatesta, best known as Guastafamiglia
- Malatesta IV Malatesta (1370–1429) or Malatesta (III or IV) Malatesta, known as dei Sonetti, son of Pandolfo II Malatesta
