= The Death of Francesca da Rimini and Paolo Malatesta =

Painting by Alexandre Cabanel

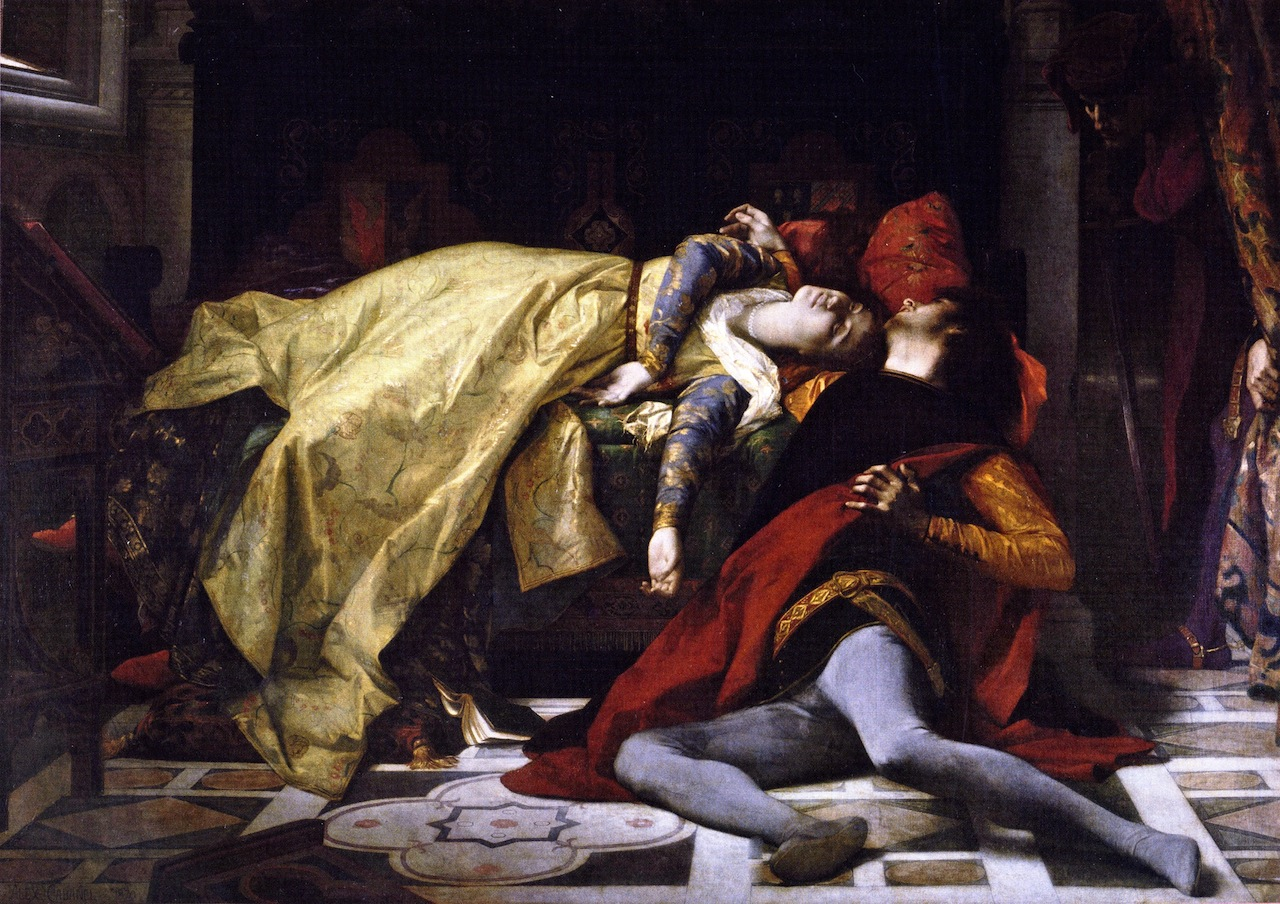
- Artist: Alexandre Cabanel
- Year: 1870
- Medium: Oil on canvas
- Dimensions: 184 cm × 255 cm (72 in × 100 in)
- Location: Musée d'Orsay, Paris

The Death of Francesca da Rimini and Paolo Malatesta is an oil on canvas painting by French artist Alexandre Cabanel, from 1870. It was first exhibited at the salon of 1870 and is now held in the Musée d'Orsay, in Paris.

== Provenance ==
The painting was purchased by the French state in 1871 for 12,000 francs. In 1874 it was assigned to the Louvre, and from 1874 to 1885 it was exhibited at the Musée du Luxembourg. It was then transferred to the Louvre in 1885 and from that year until 1985 it was held at the Musée de Picardie in Amiens, before being reassigned to the Musée d'Orsay in that year.

== Composition ==
The subject was inspired by a famous incident in medieval Italy, memorialised in poetry by Dante in Canto V of The Divine Comedy. Francesca da Rimini, married to Giovanni Malatesta, fell in love with her brother-in-law, Paolo. Her husband caught them as they were exchanging their first kiss and killed them with a single blow of his sword.

Cabanel chose an unusual moment from the tragic story for his composition. Previous artists had either, like Ingres, portrayed the moment of the couple’s first kiss, just before their murder; or, like Ary Scheffer, a time after their death when their spirits were in hell. Focusing on the murder itself allowed him to combine visual elements common to both of these more conventional renderings.

The painting has the typical elements of the classical tradition - the composition is scholarly, the brushwork smooth and the drawing precise. The book that has dropped from Francesca's hands is a reminder that the lovers were reading Lancelot at the time of their murder. Their murderer looms in the background as he looks back at his bloody work, half-concealed hidden behind a thick drape, holding his sword.

Cabanel infused the work with pathos and passion, with the heads of the young lovers just touching, and Paolo’s arm thrown round Francesca so his hand rests on her shoulder. A gentle light from the window illuminates their faces. As Cabanel developed the composition he seems to have settled on the poising of Francesca quite early, but tried several different positions for Paolo before being satisfied with its final form. The carefully-drawn foreshortening of Paolo and the outstretched arm of Francesca were aspects of the composition much admired by contemporary critics.

The scene is set in a richly carved and furnished chamber in the castle of Rimini. A reading desk stands on the left while to the right is a curtained door. Francesca appears to have fallen back from the reading desk, while Paolo, having rolled to the floor, presses his hand against the fatal wound in his side.

== Exhibition history ==
- 1870 - Salon - Palais des Champs Elysées, Paris
- 1873 - 1873 Vienna World's Fair, Vienna
- 1878 - Exposition Universelle - Trocadéro Palace, Paris
- 1879 - Internationalen Kunstausstellung - Glasspalast, Munich
- 1974 - Le musée du Luxembourg en 1874 - peintures - Grand Palais, Paris
- 1981 - Centennale des artistes français - Le Salon 1881-1981 - Grand Palais, Paris
- 1994 - Sventurati amanti - Il mito di Paolo e Francesca nell' 800 - City Museum, Rimini
- 2009-10 - De la scène au tableau - Musée Cantini, Marseille
- 2010 - Dalla scena al dipinto. La magia del teatro nella pittura dell'Ottocento. Da David a Delacroix da Füssli a Degas - Museum of Modern and Contemporary Art of Trento and Rovereto, Rovereto
- 2010-11 - Alexandre Cabanel, la tradition du beau - Musée Fabre, Montpellier
- 2011 - Alexandre Cabanel. Die Tradition des Schönen - Wallraf–Richartz Museum & Fondation Corboud, Cologne
- 2015 - El canto del cisne. Pinturas académicas del Salón de Paris. Colecciones Musée d'Orsay- Fundación Mapfre, Madrid

== Critical reception ==
The Gentleman's Magazine and Historical Review covered the 1870 salon and opined that “for beauty, no picture surpassed Cabanel’s Francesca and Paolo. Mary Knight Potter wrote that the composition is perfectly balanced in chiaroscuro and mass, the figures are perfectly drawn, and the colour is both rich and restrained. Cabanel portrayed the horror of the scene so dexterously that the viewer focuses not on the grisly reality but on the passion in the lovers’ hearts and the outraged faith of the husband.

Not all critical review was favourable. The Spectator described it as “a magnificent representation of the outside view of a great tragedy… [it is] a beautiful and dramatic picture, but hardly conceivably possible as a representation of what actually happened. William Wetmore Story wrote that in this painting, Cabanel had “failed to rise to the dignity of history or the tragedy of his subjects.” He described it as “forcibly feeble, exaggerated in action and falsely conceived.”

Frank Leslie's Historical Register of the Centennial Exposition described it tersely as “not a very striking or worthy picture”. Some felt that the work substituted superficial effects for narrative structure. Ménard felt that the lively but incoherent use of colour negated dramatic unity, while Jules-Antoine Castagnary described the painting as La deplorable package of fabrics.” Similarly, Georges Lafenestre said that instead of conveying grief and terror, a first impression of the painting was like seeing “a spread of fabrics in the display window of a store,”

Several critics were particularly harsh in their comments about the figure of the murderous husband. Lafenestre said “he has the air of a sightseer coming to take a look rather than a murderer fleeing.” Zacharie Astruc wondered why Cabanel had emphasised “the ridiculous figure of the husband, stuck like a piece of cardboard between two curtains”.
