= Scipione Sacco =

Italian painter

Scipione Sacco (or Sacchi) (1495–1558) was an Italian painter of the Renaissance, active near or in Cesena.

== Life ==
Born in the town of Sogliano al Rubicone, in his youth he came into contact with Ramberto Malatesta, Count of Sogliano, and this influenced his artistic and cultural education. However, he and his family were exiled because his father tried to poison Ramberto Malatesta.

He painted a Pope St Gregory for the cathedral of Cesena in 1545. For the church of San Domenico of Cesena, he painted a Death of St Peter Martyr. He is referred to as a likely pupil or strongly influenced by Raphael.

He died in Cesena.

== Sources ==
- Bryan, Michael (1889). Walter Armstrong; Robert Edmund Graves (eds.). Dictionary of Painters and Engravers, Biographical and Critical. Vol. II L-Z. London: George Bell and Sons. p. 436.
