= Malatesta Ungaro =

Italian condottiere (1327–1372)

Ungaro Malatesta (June 1327 – 17 July 1372), born Galeotto Malatesta, was an Italian condottiero and lord of Jesi.

Born in July 1327, he was the son of Malatesta Guastafamiglia, lord of Pesaro and Rimini, and Costanza Ondedei, and the younger brother of Pandolfo II Malatesta. He changed his name to Ungaro when King Louis I of Hungary created him knight in December 1347. He married Costanza, daughter of Obizzo III d'Este, Marquis of Ferrara, in 1363.

After being imprisoned in the war of Louis of Taranto in southern Italy, he fought as Papal commander for cardinal Gil de Albornoz against the Ordelaffi and the Manfredi. On April 16, 1363 he severely defeated Bernabò Visconti and in the following years he often supplanted his old uncle Galeotto I Malatesta as Papal commander-in-chief.

In 1367 he helped Pope Urban V to return to Rome, but the following year, having been unable to quench a revolt in Siena against Emperor Charles IV, he preferred to return to Rimini.

He died on 17 July 1372.

== See also ==
- House of Malatesta
- Rimini
- Condottieri
