= Sigismondo Malatesta =

Sigismondo Malatesta (November 1498 – December 1553) was an Italian condottiero.

== Biography ==
The son of Pandolfaccio Malatesta, Sigismondo strove for his whole life to reconquer the ancestral seat of the Malatesta seignory, Rimini, annexed by the Papal States under his ancestor Sigismondo Malatesta. In 1522 he entered the city for a first time, but was ousted by troops sent by Adrian VI.

Later, in the course of the War of the League of Cognac, he fought for the French, taking part in the capture of Nonantola and in the defence of Milan. In 1525 he was present at the Battle of Pavia. The following year he defended in vain Lodi against the Venetian troops under Malatesta Baglioni, and was protagonist of a famous duel against Baglioni's captain, Ludovico Vistarini. Later he sided with the Papal States, fighting in Parma and Fiorenzuola d'Arda against the Imperial Landsknechts.

However, during the Sack of Rome when Pope Clement VII was taken prisoner by the Imperials, he took advantage to enter Rimini. His first move was to execute all his enemies, some only suspected, in the city. Later Rimini was besieged by French troops and the city surrendered, but Malatesta returned in 1528 along with his father. When a Papal army of 6,000 troops under cardinal Giovanni Maria Del Monte was sent against him, Sigismondo agreed to hand over the city in exchange for 6,000 ducati. After a last desperate attempt to maintain the city's citadel, he took refuge in Ravenna and Ferrara.

In the following year he fought as condottiero for Venice and for the Holy Roman Empire in Hungary, and travelled to Constantinople to ask support against the Papal occupation of Rimini. He died as a poor man in Reggio Emilia, in 1553.

== See also ==
- House of Malatesta
- Rimini

== Sources ==
- Rendina, Claudio (1994). I capitani di ventura. Rome: Newton Compton. ISBN 978-8-88289-056-8.
- Herbermann, Charles, ed. (1913). "House of Malatesta" . Catholic Encyclopedia. New York: Robert Appleton Company.
