= House of Malatesta =

Italian family

Malatesta de Malatestiis
- Noble house
- Motto: "The Indian elephant isn't afraid of mosquitos" (Latin: Elephas indus culices non timet)
- Country: Italy; San Marino
- Founded: 1295; 731 years ago
- Founder: Malatesta da Verucchio
- Final ruler: Pandolfo IV Malatesta
- Titles: List: Lord of Rimini; Lord of Ascoli Piceno; Lord of Brescia; Lord of Bertinoro; Lord of Cervia; Lord of Cesena; Lord of Fano; Lord of Fermo; Lord of Fossombrone; Lord of Iesi; Lord of Pesaro; Lord of Sansepolcro; Lord of Sogliano al Rubicone; Podestà of Bologna; Podestà of Florence; Podestà of Forlì; Podestà of Padua; Podestà of Pesaro; Podestà of Rimini; Capitano del popolo of Bologna; Capitano del popolo of Florence; Papal vicar
- Estates: Castel Sismondo (Rimini); Rocca Malatestiana (Cesena)
- Dissolution: 1619
- Deposition: 1528

The House of Malatesta was an Italian family that ruled over Rimini from 1295 until 1500, as well as (in different periods) other lands and towns in Romagna and holding high positions in the government of cities in present-day Tuscany, Lombardy and Marche. The dynasty is considered among the most important and influential of the Late Middle Ages. In the period of maximum influence, they extended their domains along the Marche coast, up to Ascoli Piceno, Senigallia, Sansepolcro and Citerna, and to the north, on the territories of Bergamo and Brescia.

== History ==
The family's progenitor is said to be Rodolfo of Carpegna whose fighting spirit yielded him the sobriquet mala testa ("bad head"). From 1004 onward, he built a castle on the rock of Pennabilli.

In the 11th century, the family had possessions in the region of Gabicce Mare, Gatteo, and Poggio Berni. Giovanni Malatesta (d. 1150) owned some land between rivers Marecchia and Rubicon, and was the first to settle down in Rimini. His son married into the Traversari family, who were lords of Ravenna and Rimini during the 12th and 13th centuries. In 1186, the Malatesta became lords of Torriana. Giovanni's grandsons Giovanni and Malatesta I Malatesta (1183–1248) founded the branches of the Counts of Sogliano al Rubicone (extinguished in 1640) and "della Penna" of Pennabilli and Verucchio (until 1462). In 1216, they became citizens of Rimini.

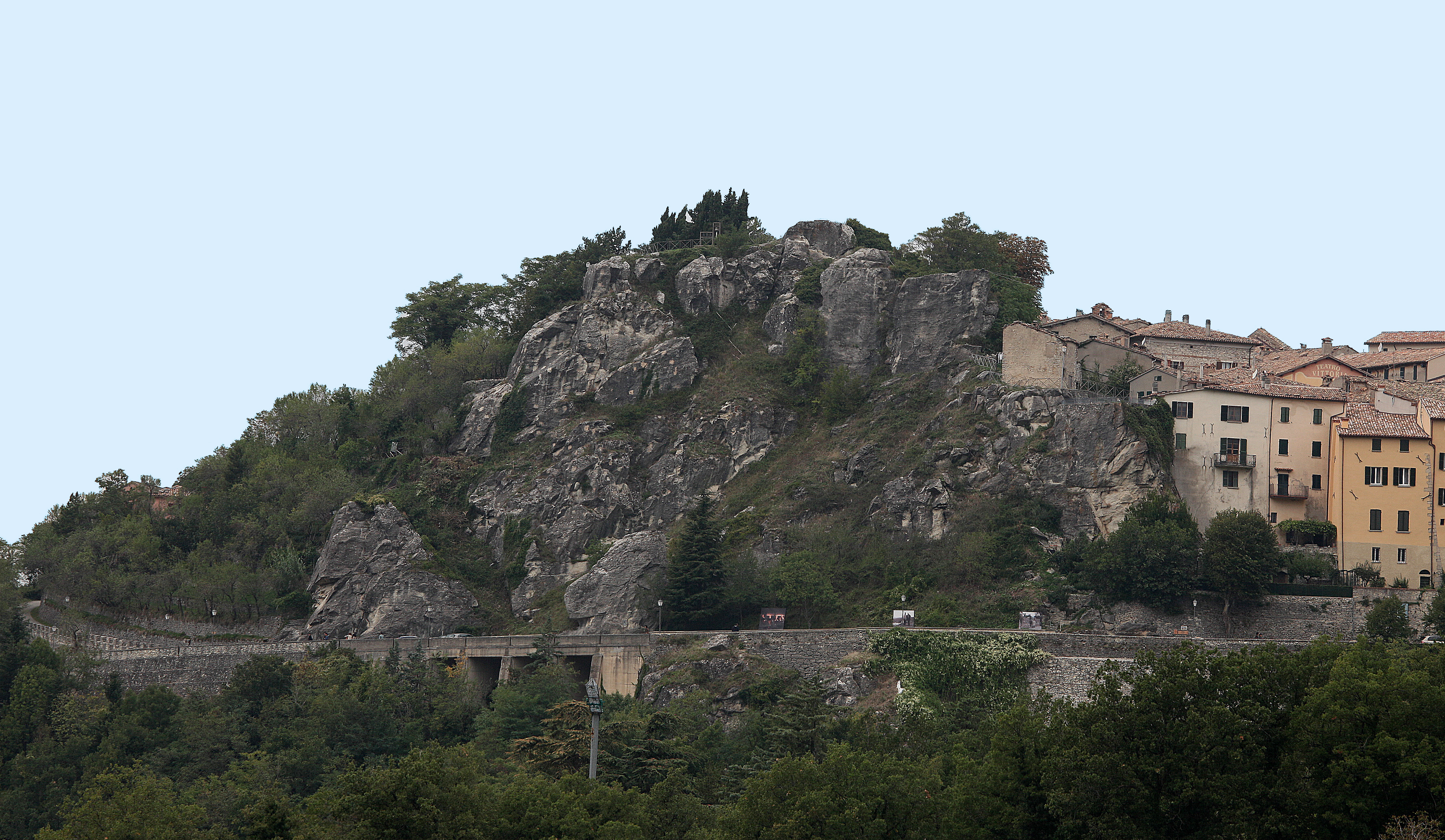
Pennabilli

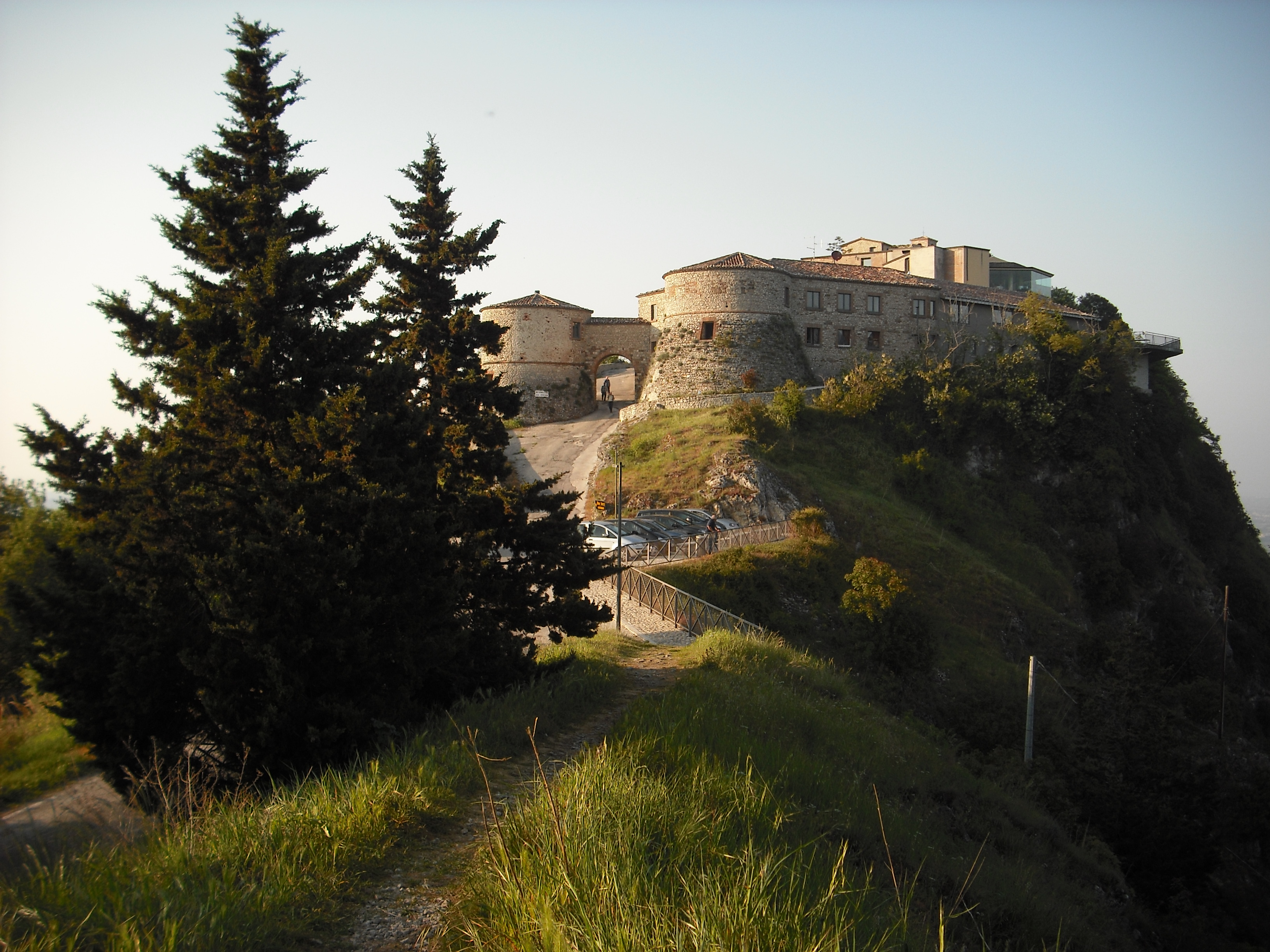
Torriana

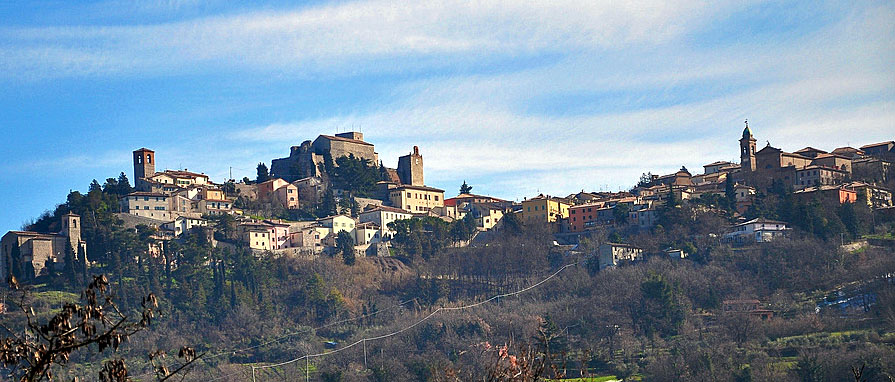
Verucchio

Malatesta I became podestà (chief magistrate) of Pistoia in 1228 and of Rimini in 1239 and 1247. During the struggles between papal and imperial followers (Guelphs and Ghibellines), he supported emperor Frederick II. His son however, Malatesta da Verucchio (d. 1312), switched sides after the emperor's defeat near Parma in 1248, and became leader of the Guelphs while Guido I of Montefeltro took the lead of the Ghibellines in the Marche and Romagna regions. Malatesta da Verucchio made himself sole master of the city ("signore") after the expulsion of the family's Ghibelline rivals, the Parcitadi, in 1295. His hunchback son Giovanni Malatesta is chiefly famous because he murdered his wife Francesca da Polenta and his younger brother Paolo in 1285, having discovered them in adultery, and the murder is recorded in Dante's Inferno as well as in a story by Giovanni Boccaccio.

Malatestino I, Giovanni's brother, became capitano of the Guelphs of Bologna in 1296 and of Florence in 1303. In 1312, he destroyed his Ghibelline cousins' castle at Sogliano, and in 1312, he followed his father as lord of Rimini. During the fourteenth and fifteenth centuries, the Malatestas ruled over a number of cities in the Romagna and the Marche, including Pesaro, Fano, Cesena, Fossombrone, and Cervia. Several Malatestas were condottieri at the service of various Italian states. Malatesta Novello built the Malatestiana Library at Cesena from 1447 to 1452.

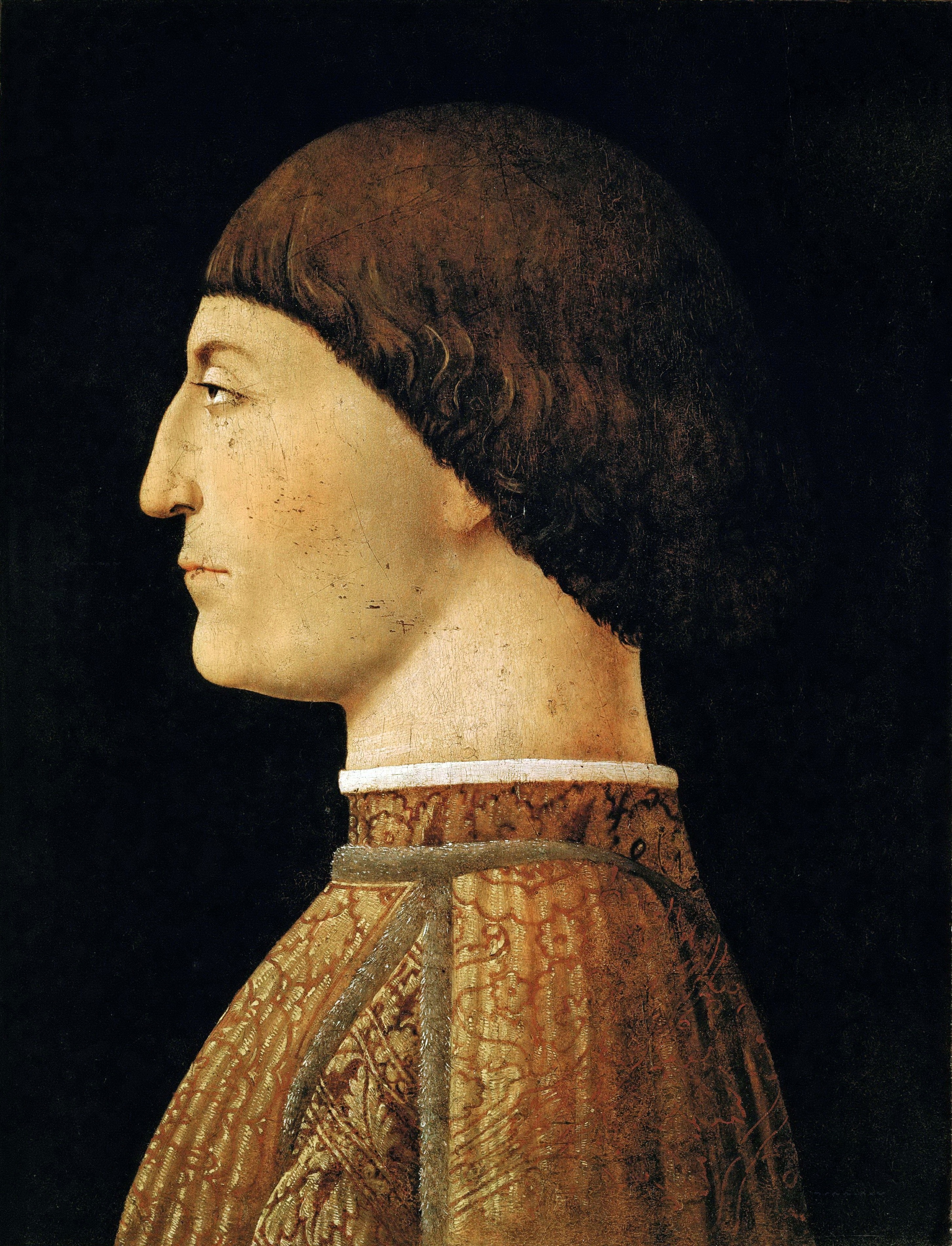
Sigismondo Pandolfo Malatesta (1417–1468), by Piero della Francesca

The most famous was Sigismondo Pandolfo Malatesta, who was engaged in conflict with the papacy over territorial claims, as well as with his rival Federico da Montefeltro. In the end, he lost almost all of his territories, except for Rimini which he held with the support of the Republic of Venice. He had, however, built the cathedral of Rimini, the Tempio Malatestiano, from 1450. His grandson Pandolfo was eventually expelled from Rimini in 1500 by Cesare Borgia and the city was finally incorporated in the Papal States in 1528, after the last failed attempt of Pandolfo's son, Sigismondo. During the 16th and 17th centuries, the family still provided a number of condottieri; the Sogliano branch extinguished in 1640; the last of the Rimini branch was the Jesuit Roberto Malatesta (d. 1708), and the Ghiaggiolo branch extinguished with Lamberto in 1757.

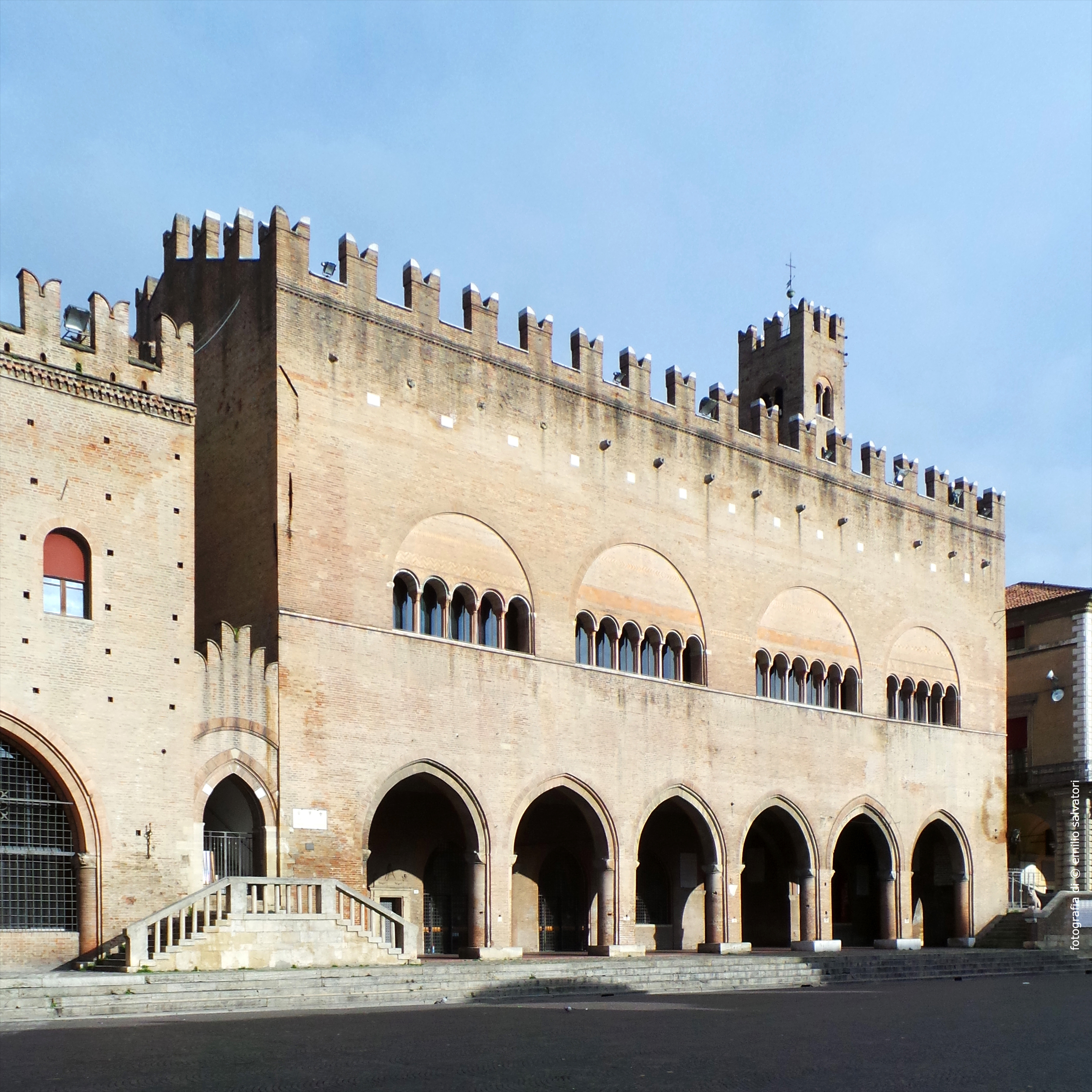
Palazzo dell'Arengo, Rimini

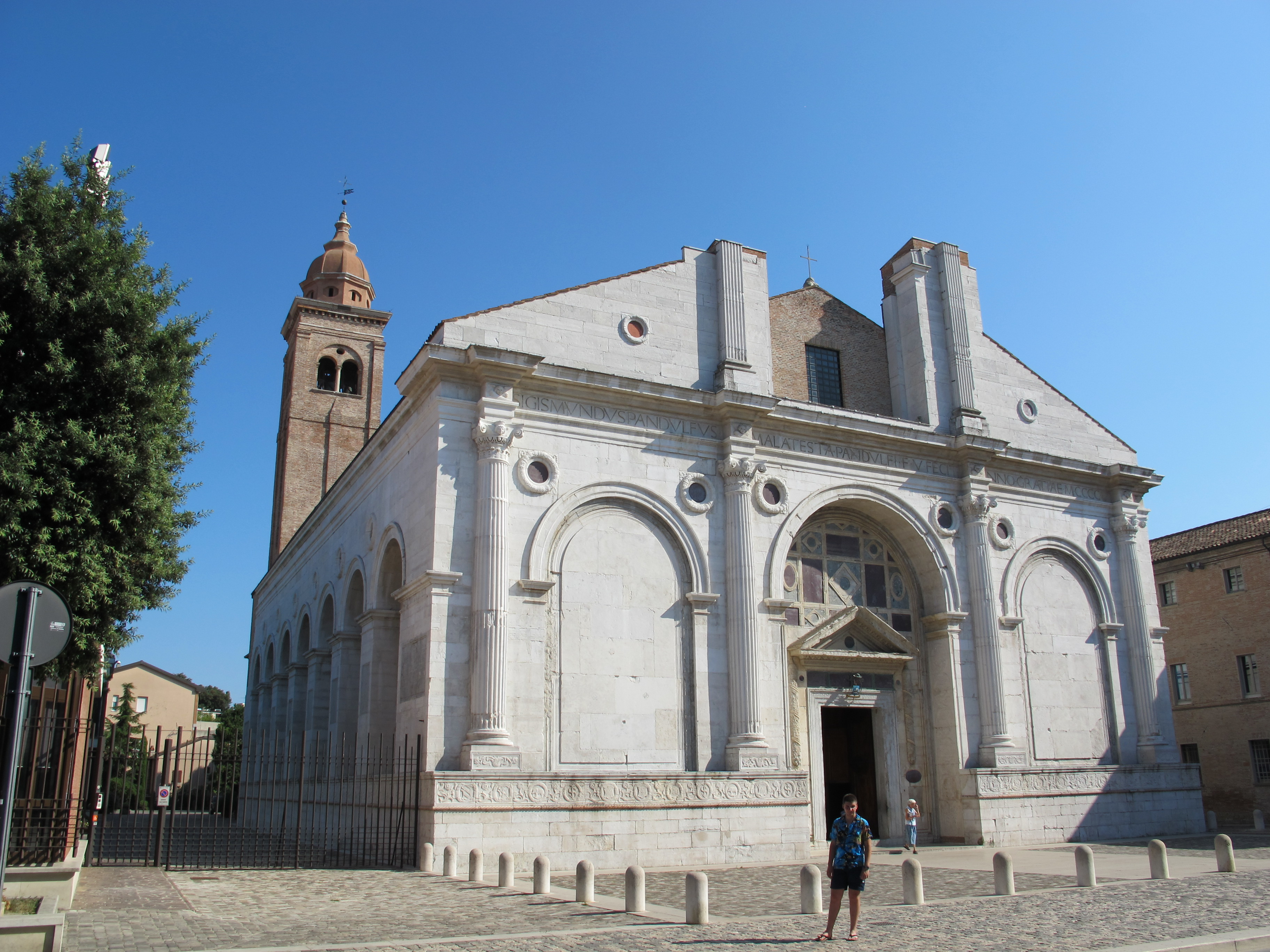
Tempio Malatestiano, Rimini

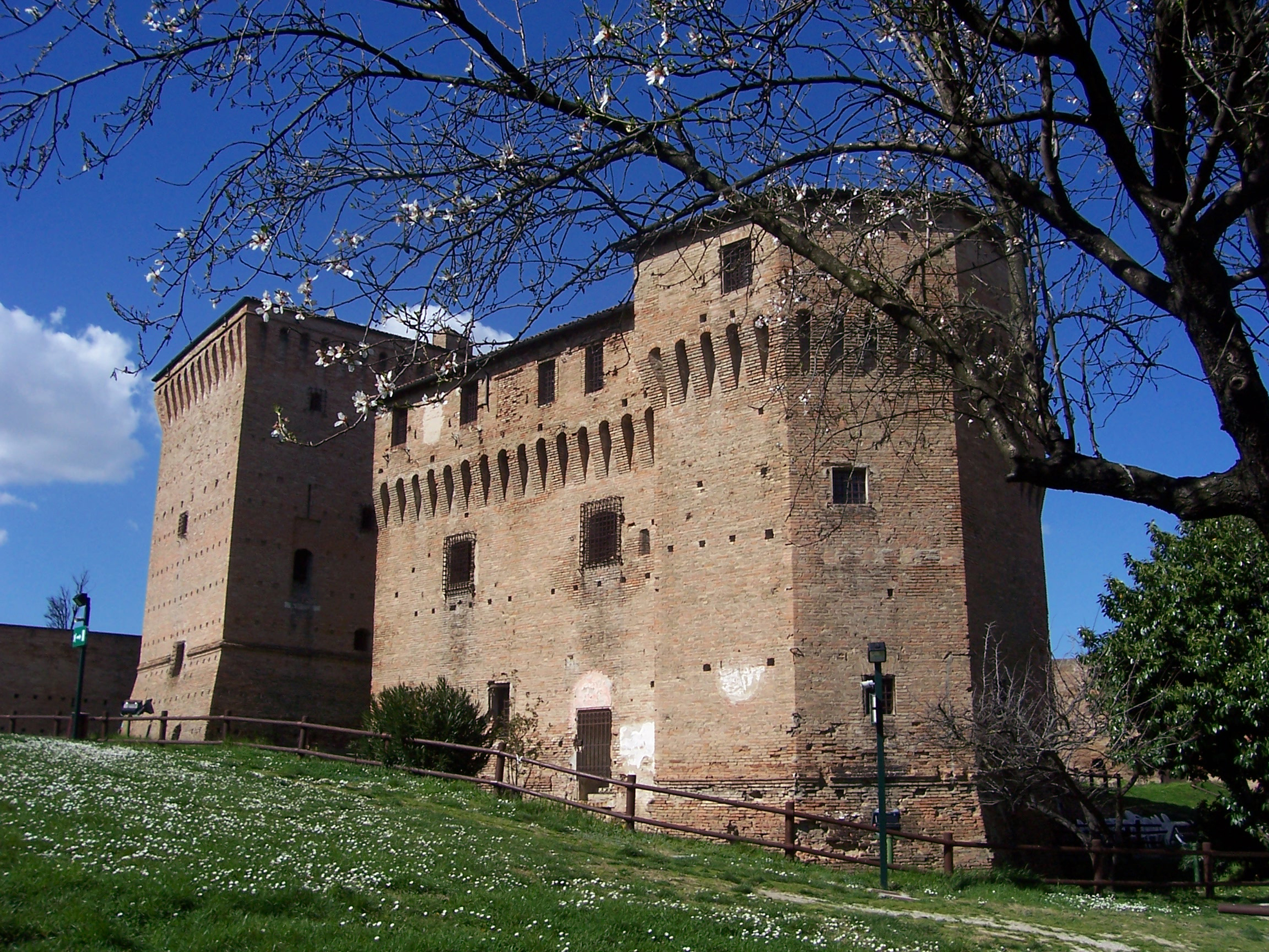
Malatesta Castle at Cesena

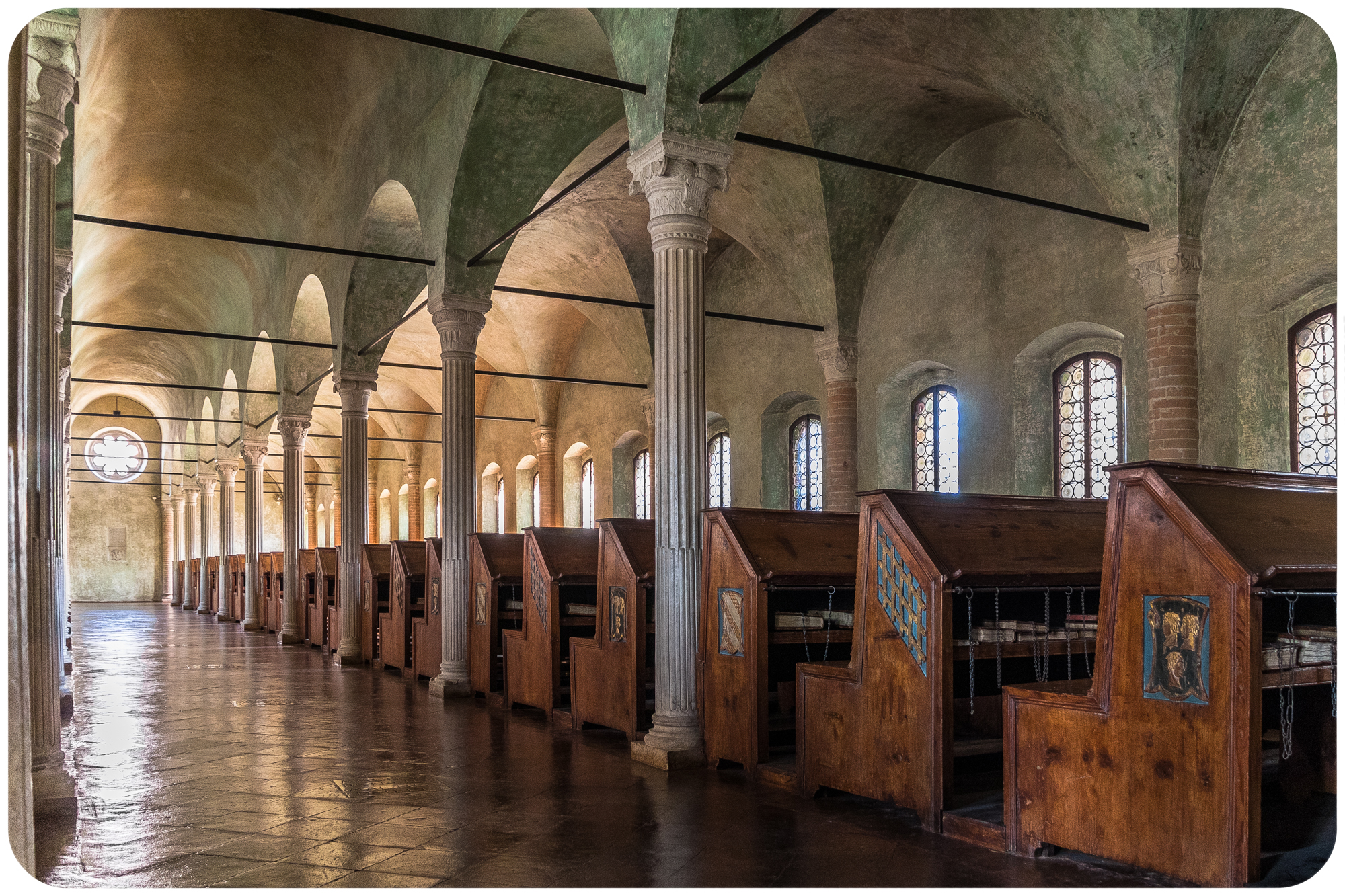
Malatestiana Library at Cesena

== Malatesta family members ==
=== Founding figures ===
- (1) Malatesta dalla Penna (d.1248)
- (2) Malatesta da Verucchio (d.1312), son of (1) – Lord of Rimini, 1295

=== 1st Generation (sons of Malatesta da Verucchio) ===
- (3) Malatestino 'dell'Occhio' (d.1316) – Lord of Rimini, 1312
- (4) Paolo 'il Bello' (d.1285) – murdered by (5)
- (5) Giovanni 'Gianciotto' (d.1304)
- (6) Pandolfo I (d.1326) – Lord of Rimini, 1317

=== 2nd Generation ===
Sons of Malatestino (3)

- (7) Ferrantino (d.1353) – Lord of Rimini, 1326; deposed and imprisoned by (11) in 1334

Sons of Gionciotto (4)

- (9) Ramberto (d.1330) – murdered by (14)
- (10) Guido the Archpriest (d.c.1334)

Son of Paolo (5)

- (8) Uberto, Count of Giaggolo (d.1323) – murdered by (9)

Sons of Pandolfo I (6)

- (11) Malatesta II 'Guastafamiglia' (d.1364) – Lord of Pesaro, 1326; and Rimini, 1334
- (12) Galeotto I (d.1385) – Lord of Rimini, etc.

=== 3rd Generation ===
Sons of Ferrantino (7)

- (13) Pandolfino (d.?)
- (14) Malatestino Novello (d.1335) – imprisoned and probably murdered by (11)

Sons of Malatesta II (11)

- (15) Malatesta 'Ungaro' (d.1364) – Lord of Jesi
- (16) Pandolfo II (d.1373) – Lord of Pesaro

Sons of Galeotto I (12)

- (17) Carlo of Rimini – Lord of Rimini
- (18) Pandolfo III of Fano (d.1427) – Lord of Fano
- (19) Andrea of Cesena (d.1416) – Lord of Cesena
- (20) Galeotto II of Cervia – Lord of Cervia

=== 4th Generation ===
Sons of Pandolfino (13)

- (21) Ferrantino Novello (d.1352)
- (22) Guido (d.1334) – imprisoned and probably murdered by (11)

== Family tree of Malatesta ==
Malatesta I lord of Rimini
Pandolfo I lord of Rimini, Pesaro	Giovanni lord of Pesaro	Malatestino lord of Rimini	Paolo capitano in Florence
Malatesta II lord of Rimini, Pesaro; BRANCH OF PESARO	Galeotto lord of Rimini, Fano, Cesena, Fossombrone; BRANCH OF RIMINI	Ferrantino lord of Rimini	Ramberto claimant
Pandolfo II lord of Pesaro	Ungaro lord of Jesi	Carlo I lord of Rimini, Pesaro, Fano, Cesena	Pandolfo III lord of Fano	Andrea lord of Fossobrone
Malatesta III lord of Pesaro, Fossombrone, Jesi	Galeotto Roberto lord of Rimini	Domenico Novello condottiero	(illeg.); Sigismondo Pandolfo lord of Rimini, Fano
Galeazzo lord of Pesaro, Fossombrone	Carlo II lord of Pesaro, Fossombrone	Cleofa Malatesta	Theodore II Palaiologos despot of Morea	Roberto lord of Rimini
Pandolfo IV lord of Rimini
Sigismondo condottiero

== See also ==
- House of Malatesta members

== Sources ==
- J. Larner (1965) The Lords of Romagna: Romagnol society and the origins of the Signorie, Ithaca: Cornell University Press, p. 243
- P. H. Wicksteed and E.G. Gardner, (1902) Dante and Giovanni del Virgilio, Westminster: Archibald Constable, p. 249, 336
