= Francesca da Rimini (play) =

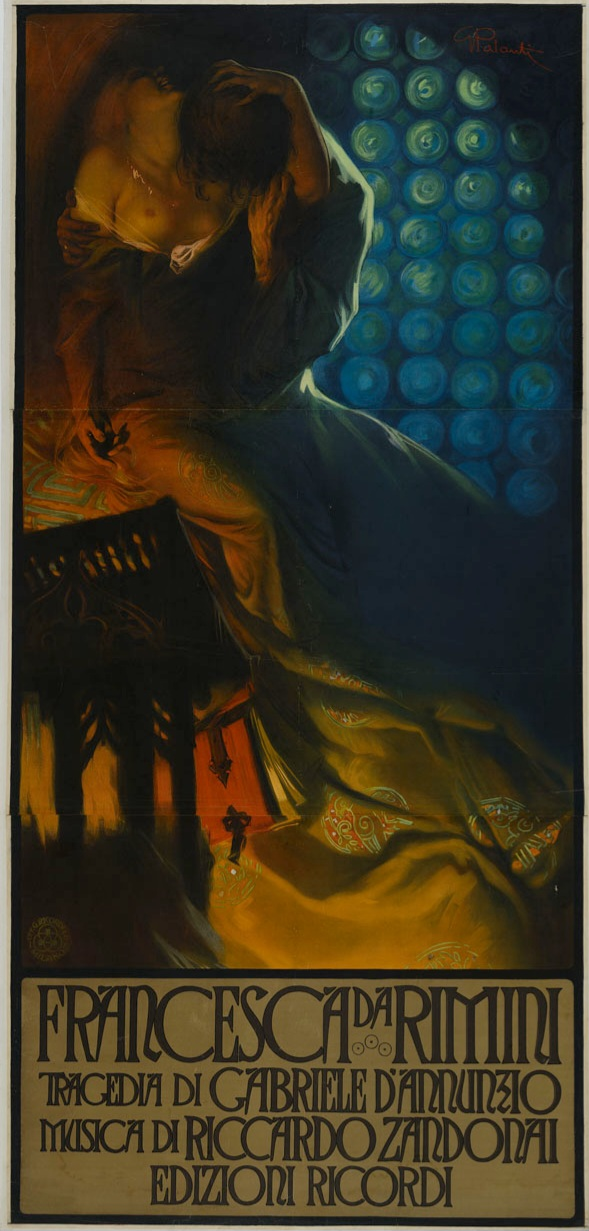
Poster for d'Annunzio's Francesca da Rimini by Giuseppe Palanti, 1914.

Francesca da Rimini is a 1901 play by the Italian writer Gabriele d'Annunzio. It tells the story of how Francesca da Rimini falls in love with her brother-in-law in the 13th century.

The play is based on an episode from Dante Alighieri's Inferno. It was written for d'Annunzio's lover Eleonora Duse, who played the title role in the original production in 1901. An English translation by Arthur Symons was published in 1902. It is the basis for Riccardo Zandonai's 1914 opera Francesca da Rimini.
