= Galeotto I Malatesta =

Italian lord

Galeotto I Malatesta (1299–1385) was an Italian condottiero from the House of Malatesta who was lord of Rimini, Fano, Ascoli Piceno, Cesena and Fossombrone.

== Biography ==
Born in Rimini, he was the son of Pandolfo I Malatesta and the brother of Malatesta II Malatesta. In 1333 he was captured while besieging Ferrara, but was soon freed and fought alongside Ferrantino Malatesta against the Papal legate in Romagna. When the latter plotted against him, Galeotto imprisoned him and declared himself lord of Rimini. The war between the two lasted until 1343. Ludwig of Bavaria also made him lord of Fano.

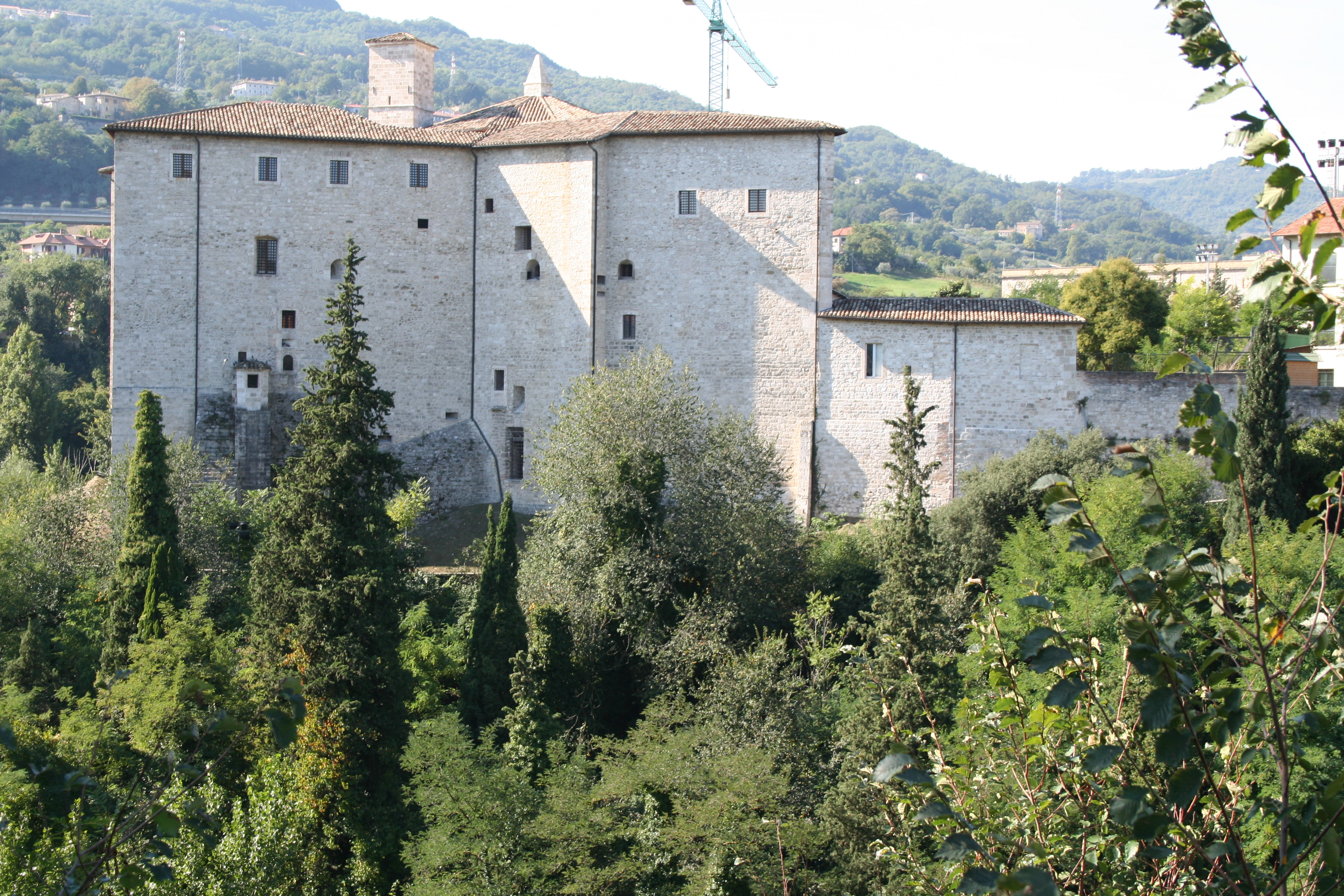
Forte Malatesta in Ascoli Piceno, built by Galeotto and later remade by Antonio da Sangallo the Younger.

After a period as condottiero for and later tyrant of Ascoli Piceno, in 1349 he travelled to the Holy Land. In 1351 he was hired in the Kingdom of Naples. In 1352 Malatesta led a campaign in Abruzzo in the service of Louis of Anjou, King of Sicily, and laid siege to the fortress of Aversa, held by the mercenary leader Fra' Moriale.

In 1353 Innocent VI sent Gil Álvarez Carrillo de Albornoz as a legate into Italy, with a view to the restoration of the papal authority in the states of the Church, at the head of a small mercenary army. After receiving the support of the archbishop of Milan, Giovanni Visconti, and of those of Pisa, Florence and Siena, he defeated Giovanni di Vico, lord of Viterbo, who had usurped much of the Papal territories in the Latium and Umbria. Giovanni was defeated in the battle of Viterbo on 10 March 1354 and signed a treaty of submission. Albornoz then moved to the Marche and Romagna against the Malatesta of Rimini and the Ordelaffi of Forlì. The Papal commander Rodolfo II da Varano, lord of Camerino, defeated Galeotto Malatesta, forcing his family to become an ally of the Pope.

After the Albornoz's defeat his family was made Papal vicar in Rimini, Pesaro, Fano and Fossombrone. In 1356 he took part in the crusade declared against the Ordelaffi of Forlì. In 1360 he was first made commander-in-chief by the Queen of Naples Joan I, but later he switched to the Republic of Florence and then again to the Byzantine Empire. In 1372 Pope Gregory XI confirmed Galeotto general commander of the Papal Army against Bernabò Visconti, whom he defeated at Montichiari, near Brescia, the following year.

After the death of his nephews, Galeotto managed to gain the whole family seigniory in Romagna (he had been already lord of Rimini from 1364 with Ungaro IV and Pandolfo II Malatesta, as well as sole ruler of Fano). After a series of small but ferocious ravages in the area, in 1376 he captured Cesena, adding Bertinoro in 1378. Later he warred against Guido da Polenta for Cesenatico, conquering Senigallia from him in 1383, as well as other lands. The war was continued by his sons, as Galeotto I died in 1385 at Cesena.

== Family ==
He married Elisabetta da Varano daughter of Rodolfo II da Varano and had issue:

- Carlo I Malatesta 1368–1429, condottiero, lord of Rimini, Fano, Cesena, Pesaro.
- Pandolfo III Malatesta c.1369-1427, condottiero, lord of Fano.
- Margherita Malatesta 1370–1399, married to Francesco I Gonzaga ruler of Mantua.
- Andrea Malatesta 1373–1416, condottiero, lord of Cesena, Cervia, Bertinoro.
- Galeotto II, lord of Cervia.

Preceded by Ungaro Malatesta	Lord of Rimini; 1372–1385	Succeeded by Carlo I Malatesta
Preceded by To the Papal States	Lord of Cesena; 1376	Succeeded by Andrea Malatesta
