= Pandolfo IV Malatesta =

Italian condottiero

Pandolfo IV Malatesta, nicknamed Pandolfaccio (Bad Pandulph) (July 1475 – June 1534) was an Italian condottiero and lord of Rimini and other cities in Romagna. He was a member of the House of Malatesta and a minor player in the Italian Wars.

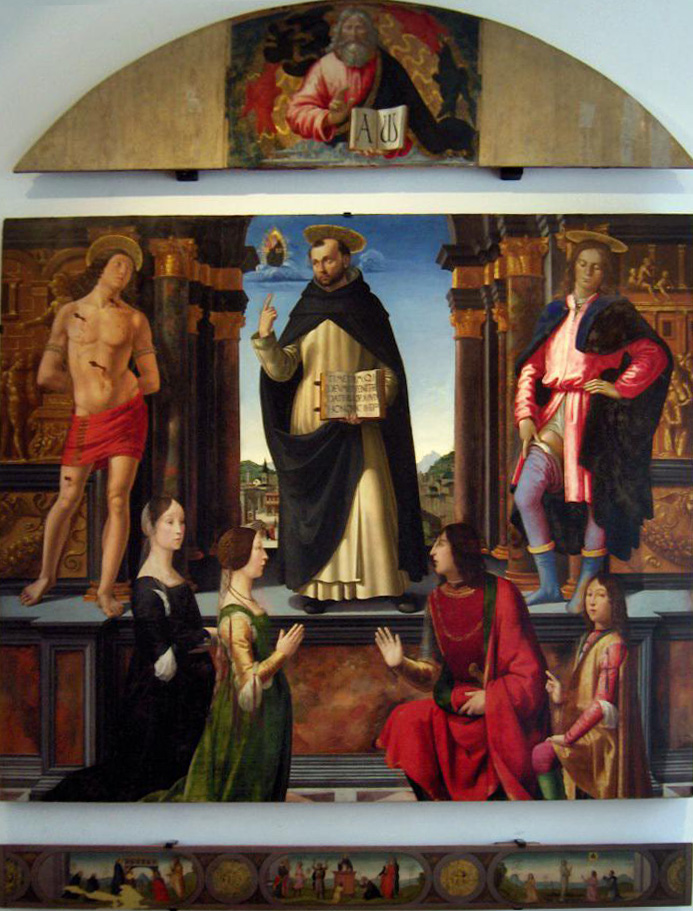
Altarpiece of St. Vincent Ferrer (with St. Sebastian and St. Rocchus; at his feet : Pandolfo IV Malatesta and his mother Elisabetta Aldobrandini, his wife Violantre Bentivoglio and his brother Carlo) by Domenico Ghirlandaio and workshop (1493-1496)

He was the son of Roberto Malatesta, at the death of whom (1482) he was created captain general of the Republic of Venice. Four years later he was created knight by King Alfonso II of Naples.

In 1495, hired by the Venetians, he took part in the Battle of Fornovo, and later besieged the French garrison Novara. Pandolfo's violence and murders gained him the hatred of his subjects: in 1497, a failed rape attempt on a young girl spurred a revolt in Rimini, which he could suppress only with Venetian intervention. He escaped another plot in 1498.

Two years later, Cesare Borgia invaded Pandolfo's territories and Pope Alexander VI, Cesare's father, excommunicated him. Abandoned by his subjects, Pandolfo was compelled to give up Rimini for 2,900 ducats, living in Venice in the following years. After Alexander's death, he took advantage of Cesare's illness to attack Rimini in 1503, but without definitive success. In 1509, he took part in the Battle of Agnadello, and after the Venetian defeat he changed sides, submitting to the Holy Roman Emperor. He later besieged Padua, but was forced to return to his fief of Cittadella, which was officially given him in 1512. He later returned to Venice.

In 1522, Pandolfo, together with his son Sigismondo, managed to regain briefly Rimini. In 1527, after the Sack of Rome and capture of Pope Clement VII, the two Malatestas entered again their ancestral city, but were soon ousted by Papal mercenaries.

He later lived in poverty at Ferrara, under the protection of Duke Alfonso d'Este. Pandolfo died in 1534 in Rome. He is buried in the church of Santa Maria in Trastevere.

== Sources ==
- Detailed vita of Pandolfo Malatesta. (in Italian)

Italian nobility
Preceded by Roberto Malatesta	Lord of Rimini; 1482–1500	Succeeded by Cesare Borgia
Preceded by Cesare Borgia	Lord of Rimini; 1503	Succeeded by to the Republic of Venice
Preceded by to the Papal States	Lord of Rimini; 1522–1523	Succeeded by to the Duchy of Urbino
