= Pandolfo I Malatesta =

Italian condottiere (c. 1267 – 1326)

Pandolfo I Malatesta (c. 1267 – 6 April 1326), son of Malatesta da Verucchio, was an Italian condottiero and Lord of Rimini from 1317.

== Biography ==
In 1304, at the death of Pope Boniface VIII, he captured Pesaro, Fano, Senigallia and Fossombrone, which he lost and recovered in the following years.

In 1317, he became the lord of Rimini and the head of the Malatesta family at the death of his brother, Malatestino dell'Occhio.

In 1321, he was capitano generale (supreme commander) of the Papal States against the Ghibellines and the Montefeltro of Urbino.

Pandolfo I had two sons: Malatesta II and Galeotto I.

At his death in 1326, there was a struggle for succession between his eldest son, Malatesta II and his nephew Ferrantino (son of Malatestino). A partition was reached by which Malatesta II succeeded in Pesaro and Ferrantino in Rimini.

Preceded by Giovanni Malatesta	Lord of Pesaro; 1304–1306	Succeeded by to the Papal States
Preceded by Malatestino	Lord of Rimini; 1317–1326	Succeeded by Ferrantino
Preceded by to the Papal States	Lord of Pesaro; 1320–1326	Succeeded by Malatesta II Malatesta
