= Pandolfo II Malatesta =

Italian condottiero

Pandolfo II Malatesta (1325 – January 1373) was an Italian condottiero.

The son of Malatesta II Malatesta, he fought under Werner von Urslingen and Gil de Albornoz. Later served Galeazzo II Visconti of Milan, but raised the jealousy of Bernabò Visconti and fled to the Marche. Later held a condotta for Florence against Pisa and fought against John Hawkwood.

He died in Pesaro.

== Marriage ==
He married Paola Orsini. They had issue:

1. Malatesta IV Malatesta
2. Elisabetta Malatesta, married Rodolfo III da Varano, signore de Camerino
3. Paola Bianca Malatesta (b 1366 -d. 1382). Married Sinobaldo Ordelaffi Lord of Forli. Married secondly her cousin Pandolfo III Malatesta

Preceded by Malatesta I Malatesta	Lord of Pesaro; 1326–1330	Succeeded by to the Papal States
Preceded by to the Papal States	Lord of Pesaro; 1333–1340	Succeeded by Galeotto Malatesta
