= Malatesta II Malatesta =

Italian condottiere

Malatesta II (or III) Malatesta, best known as Guastafamiglia ("the Ruiner of the Family", c. 1299 – 18 August 1364), was an Italian condottiero and lord of Rimini.

== Biography ==
He was the son of Pandolfo I, lord of Pesaro, Fano, Senigallia and Rimini.

Together with Pandolfo, he participated in the "crusade" declared by Pope John XII against Federico I of Urbino, being protagonist of massacres and ravages. He probably took part in the assassination of both Rinaldo da Polenta, lord of Ravenna, and Uberto Malatesta. When Pandolfo died in 1326, the seigniory went to his nephew Ferrantino. Guastafamiglia obtained Pesaro; later, through a complex series of intrigues, he had the Papal legate ban Ferrantino from Rimini. Captured by the Este in the battle of Ferrara (April 14, 1333), Malatesta and his brother Galeotto were freed to fight against the Papal troops. They reconquered much of Romagna, initially re-establishing Ferrantino in Rimini and capturing Fossombrone and Fano. However, they soon imprisoned Ferrantino by treason in the Castle of Gradara, and assumed the dominio of Rimini and its countryside.

In 1336, Ferrantino was liberated by Nolfo da Montefeltro, and a long war ensued. Situation changed when Pisa and the Visconti of Milan declared war to Florence; in 1342 Malatesta and Galeotto were hired to command the Florentine army at the head of 200 men-at-arms, but with scarce success. In the same year, the two brothers signed a peace with the Pope, being confirmed in their territories: Galeotto had Fano, Malatesta Rimini, while his sons Pandolfo and Malatesta Ungaro were settled in Pesaro. However, their treacherous and wavering attitudes were again apparent when they housed King Louis I of Hungary in his campaign in Italy against the Pope. When the latter fled to Avignon, they also turned Ghibellines and obtained the title of Imperial vicars, managing soon to capture Ancona, Jesi, Ascoli and Senigallia, and stripping Ferrantino of his last possession, Montiano.

In 1351, Galeotto returned from the Holy Land, and they were called to the Kingdom of Naples to suppress the ruthless Grande Compagnia led by Fra' Moriale. When the latter revenged attacking Romagna during their absence, Rimini itself was in peril. The following year they agreed to pay a ransom of 40,000 ducati to save the situation.

At the same time, Pope Innocent VI sent the strong Cardinal and general Gil de Albornoz to settle forever the anarchy in the Papal Romagna. The Malatestas allied with Francesco II Ordelaffi of Forlì and Gentile da Fogliano to stand him. After an initial success with the conquest of Fermo, however, all their cities were captured by the Papal forces. Malatesta had to submit, but maintained most of his lands with the nominal title of vicar; he thenceforth collaborated in the Papal suppression of the remaining independent petty lords of Romagna, as well as in the war against Bernabò Visconti in the defence of Bologna, at the command of an army mostly composed of Hungarian mercenaries. After another number of the slaughters for which he had become famous, Malatesta repeatedly defeated the Milanese army. However, in 1363 he retired, leaving his son Ungaro in command and handing over Rimini to Galeotto.

== See also ==
- House of Malatesta
- Rimini
- Condottieri
- Guelphs and Ghibellines

== Sources ==
- Rendina, Claudio (1985). I capitani di ventura. Rome: Newton Compton. ISBN 88-8289-056-2.

Preceded by Pandolfo I	Lord of Pesaro; 1326–1330	To the Papal States
To the Papal States	Lord of Pesaro; 1333–1340	Succeeded by Pandolfo II
Preceded by Ferrantino	Lord of Rimini; 1335–1363	Succeeded by Malatesta Ungaro
