= Ferrantino Malatesta =

Ferrantino Malatesta (c. 1258 – 12 November 1353) was a lord of Rimini and several other lands in northern Italy, a member of the Malatesta family.

He was the son of Malatestino dell'Occhio, becoming lord in Rimini after the death of the latter's brother Pandolfo I. Ferrantino had been previously podestà of Bologna, Florence Padua, Forlì, Cesena and other cities.

In 1330 he was banned from Rimini by the Papal legate, through the intrigues of his uncle Malatesta Guastafamiglia of Pesaro. Ferrantino ruled again briefly from 1334 to 1335, when he was imprisoned by Guastafamiglia.

He died in Rimini in 1353.

Ferrantino Malatesta House of Malatesta Born: unknown 1258 Died: 12 November 1353
Regnal titles
Preceded by Pandolfo I	Lord of Rimini; 1326–1330	Succeeded by To the Papal States
Preceded by To the Papal States	Lord of Rimini; 1334–1335	Succeeded by Malatesta II
