= Malatesta da Verucchio =

Italian condottiere (1212–1312)

Malatesta da Verucchio (1212–1312) was the founder of the powerful Italian Malatesta family and a notable condottiero. He was born in Verucchio. He was the son of Malatesta della Penna (1183–1248).

== Biography ==
He was the leader of the Guelphs in Romagna and became podestà (chief magistrate) of Rimini in 1239. In 1295, he made himself the undisputed ruler of Rimini by killing the chief members of the rival Ghibelline family, the Parcitati, including their leader Montagna.

His eldest son was Giovanni Malatesta, famous for the 1285 tragedy, recorded in Dante's Inferno, in which he killed his wife Francesca da Polenta and his younger brother Paolo, having discovered them in adultery.

He was succeeded as lord of Rimini by his sons, first by Malatestino and later by Pandolfo I.

Preceded by To the Papal States	Lord of Rimini; 1295–1312	Succeeded by Malatestino Malatesta
