= Paolo Malatesta =

Italian noble (1246–1285)

- Count of Ghiaggiolo
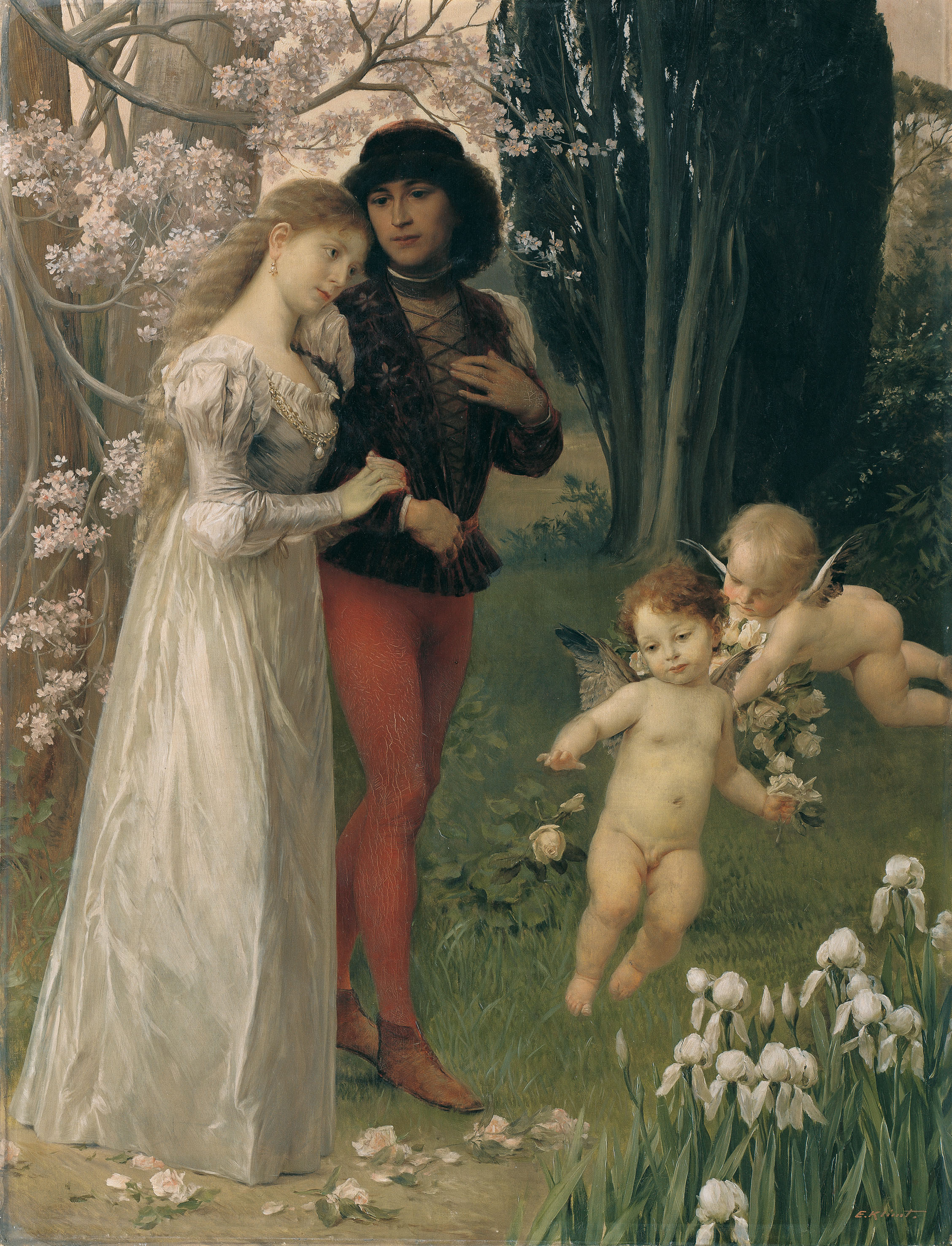
- Paolo and Francesca, by Ernst Klimt (c. 1890)

- Coat of arms
- Reign: 1269 - 1285
- Predecessor: Uberto I di Ghiaggiolo
- Successor: Uberto II Malatesta
- Born: circa 1246; Verucchio, Romagna, Papal States (now in Italy)
- Died: Between 1282 and 1285; Gradara, Marche, Papal States (now in Italy)
- Buried: Chiesa di Sant'Agostino, Rimini
- Spouse: Orabile Beatrice di Ghiaggiolo
- Issue: Uberto Malatesta; Margherita Malatesta
- Father: Malatesta da Verucchio
- Mother: Concordia dei Pandolfini

Paolo Malatesta (Italian pronunciation: [ˈpaːolo malaˈtɛsta]; c. 1246 – 1285), also known as il Bello ('the Beautiful'), was the third son of Malatesta da Verucchio, Lord of Rimini. He is best known for the story of his affair with Francesca da Polenta, portrayed by Dante in a famous episode of his Inferno (Canto V). He was the brother of Giovanni (Gianciotto) and Malatestino Malatesta.

== Life ==
Paolo's birth can be placed around 1246 in Verucchio. He was the third-born son of Malatesta da Verucchio (Dante's "Mastin Vecchio") and his first wife Concordia dei Pandolfini. His family gave rise to the Malatesta lords of Rimini. He was the progenitor of the Malatesta di Ghiaggiolo (or Giaggiolo) branch in the Forlì Apennines. He had three brothers: Giovanni (called Gianciotto), Malatestino and Maddalena. He was called "il Bello" for his physical prowess, as opposed to Gianciotto's unattractiveness.

In 1269 Paolo married Orabile Beatrice, the last heir of the counts of Ghiaggiolo, a fief located in the Forlì Apennines, which remained without male heirs. The county also included Cusercoli, Valdoppio, and Particeto. The House of Ghiaggiolo was allied with the Montefeltro family, both Ghibellines and antagonists of the Guelph House of Malatesta. The wedding was a diplomatic success by Malatesta da Verucchio who aspired to possess the territories of the Ghiaggiolo family.

They had two children: Uberto II, who bore the noble title, and Margherita, future bride of Aghinolfo Guidi di Romena. Paolo was thus the progenitor of the Malatesta di Ghiaggiolo line which became extinct in 1757 with Lamberto. The union was not happy, however, as the young man's feelings were for his sister-in-law Francesca da Polenta, wife of his brother Giovanni, who had aroused keen interest in him since their first meeting when she thought she had to marry Paolo and not Gianciotto. In fact, at the proxy marriage, celebrated in Ravenna, Paolo represented Gianciotto.

Traditionally Paolo has been portrayed as a romantic, beautiful figure, not very inclined to aspirations for power, instead focused on culture and the pleasures of life. Recent investigations, however, reveal him as a young man very attentive to politics and immersed in the political intrigue of the time, capable of separating political life from sentimental life, however legendary, turbulent and passionate.

Paolo followed his father in war against the Ghibellines. In 1265 he fought against Guido da Montefeltro with Malatesta and, in the same year, he faced the Traversari with Guido da Polenta of Ravenna.

His diplomatic skills led him to be chosen by Pope Martin IV as Captain of the People in Florence in March 1282. It was probably here that Dante Alighieri had the opportunity to meet him. With the return to Rimini, his promising career was interrupted by his tragic death. Paolo was killed by his brother Gianciotto together with his wife, Francesca. The murders occurred when the two lovers were surprised together by Gianciotto himself, probably between February 1283 (the date of Paolo's return to Rimini) and 1284. The traditional place where the assassination took place would have been the Gradara castle.

The story is told in a memorable passage from Dante's Inferno ( Canto V ). Dante inserted the episode in homage to Paolo whom he had known in his youth in Florence; many years later, long since in exile, he was called to Ravenna by Francesca's father and got to know the historical site of the story recounted by him years before. In the fortress of Gradara a tomb was found that belonged to a noble lady, however nothing was found in regards to the tomb of Paolo that his brother would have well hidden, because it would have been tangible proof of the betrayal of his wife and of the murders, especially in view of his second marriage.

== Gallery ==
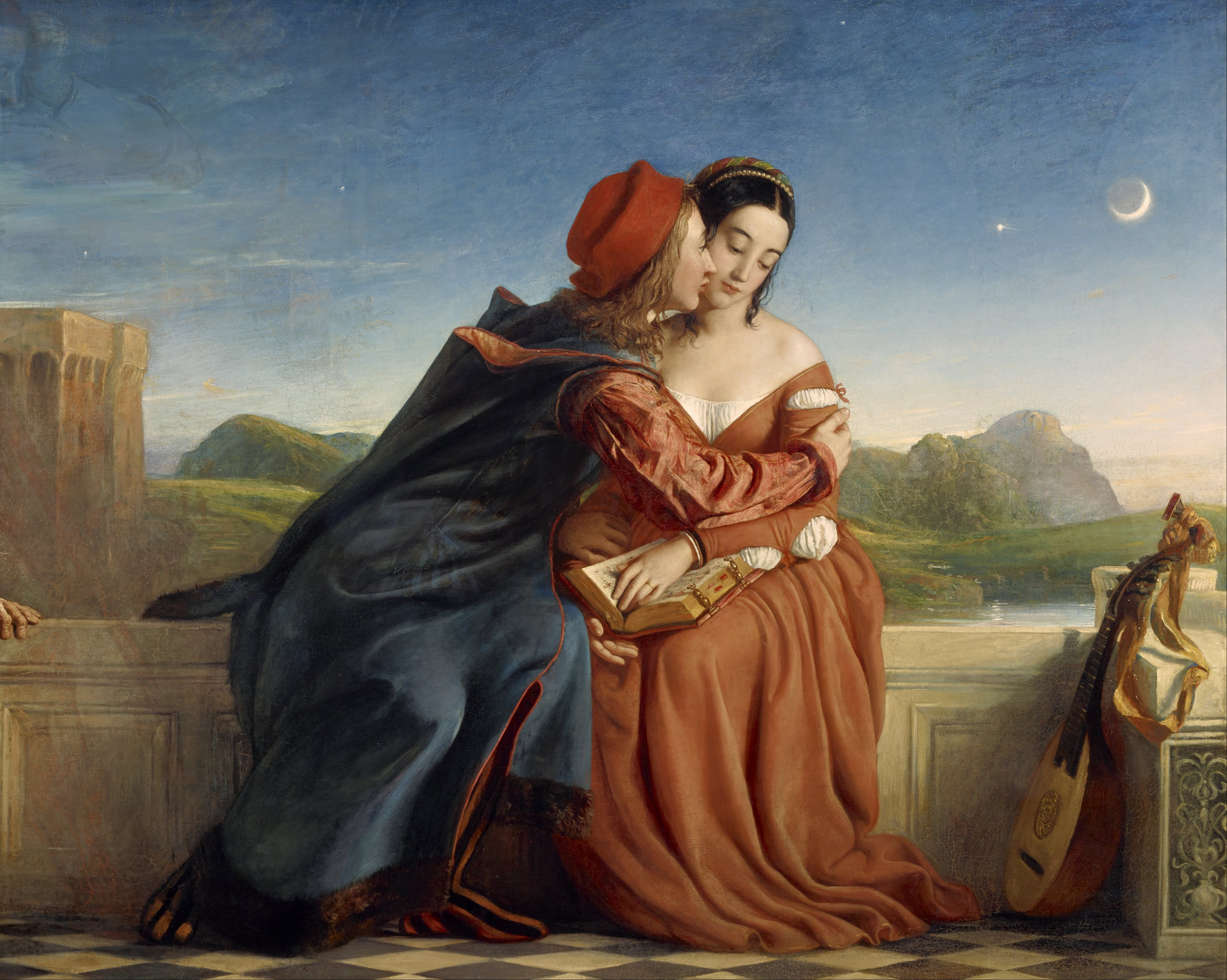
Francesca da Rimini (1837), by William Dyce

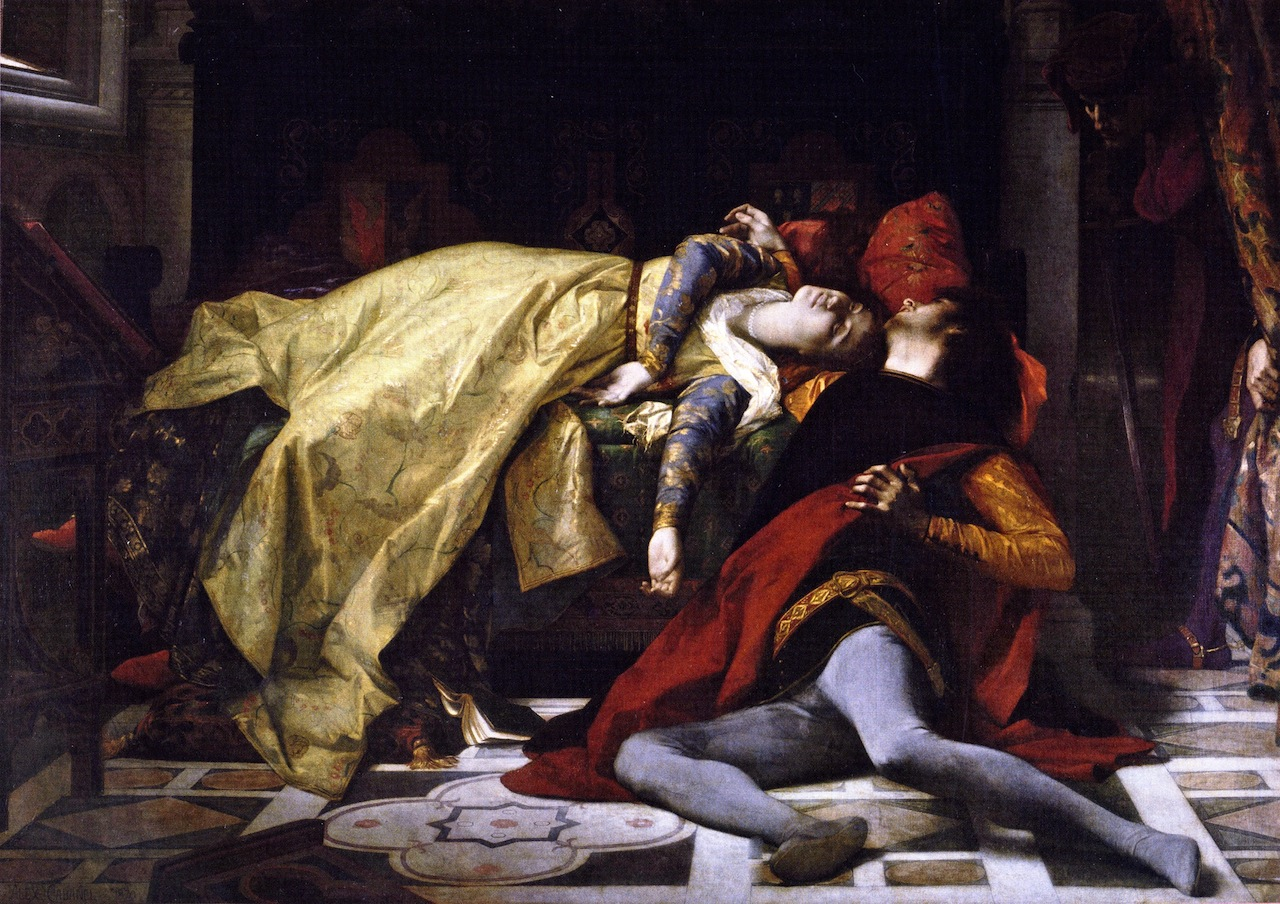
The Death of Francesca da Rimini and Paolo Malatesta by Alexandre Cabanel (1870)

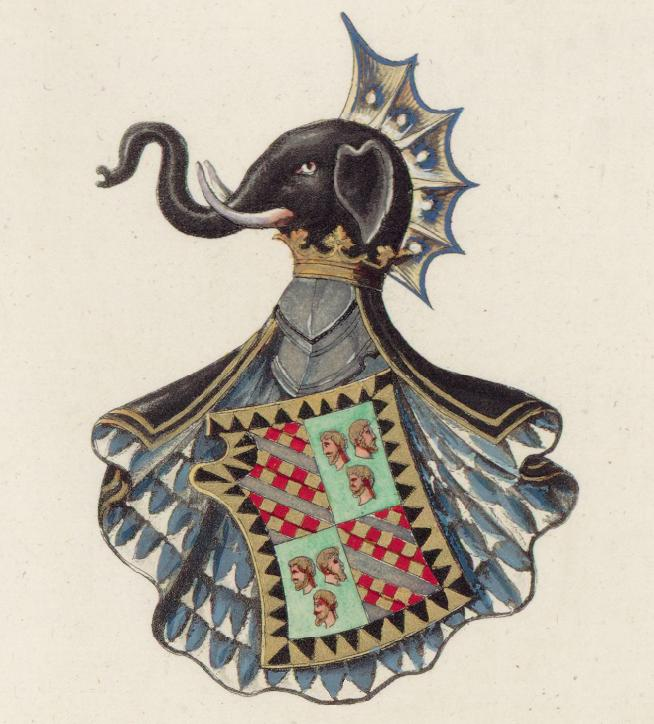
Blazon of Malatesta (from Pompeo Litta)

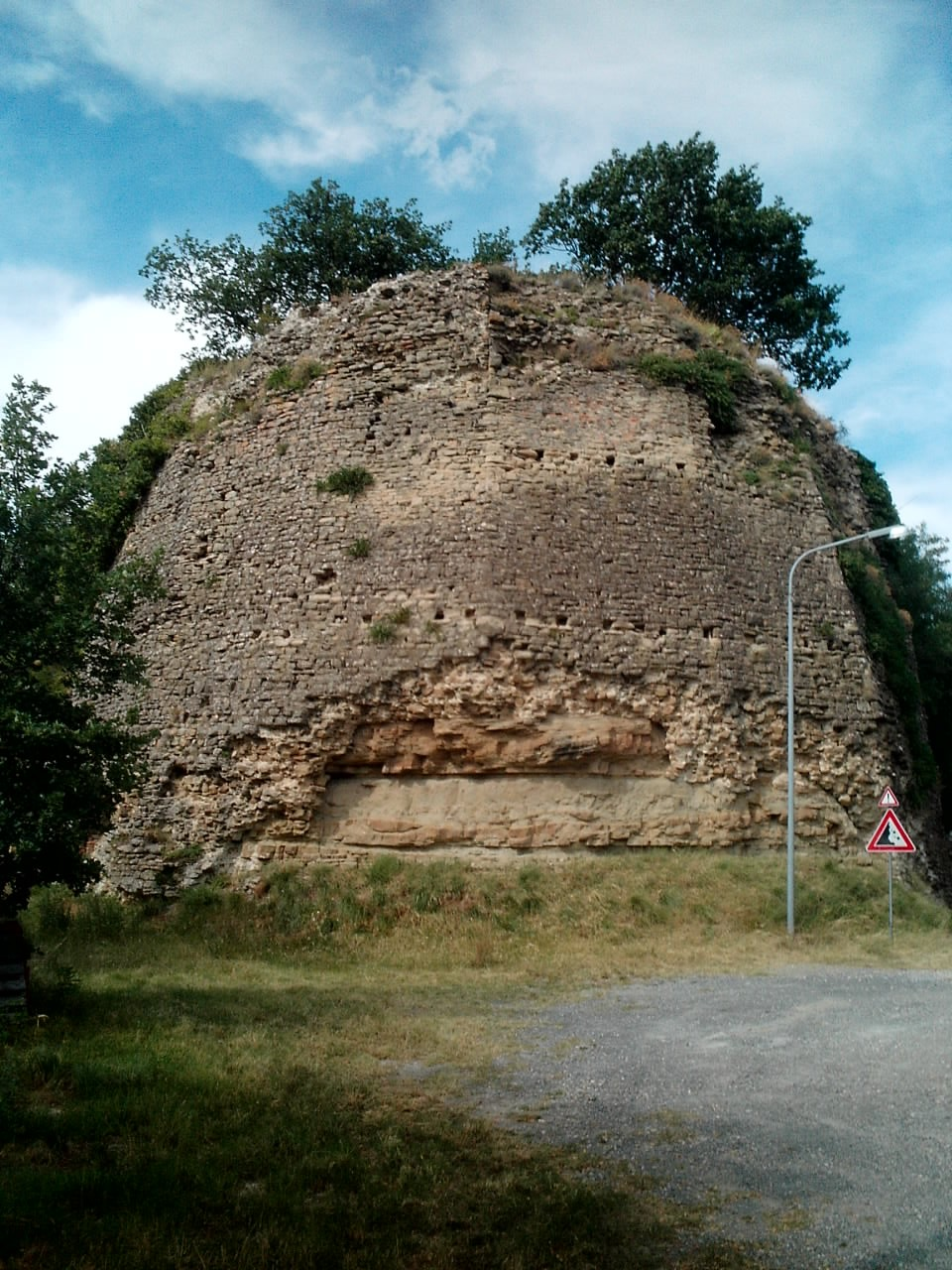
Remains of the Giaggiolo Castle

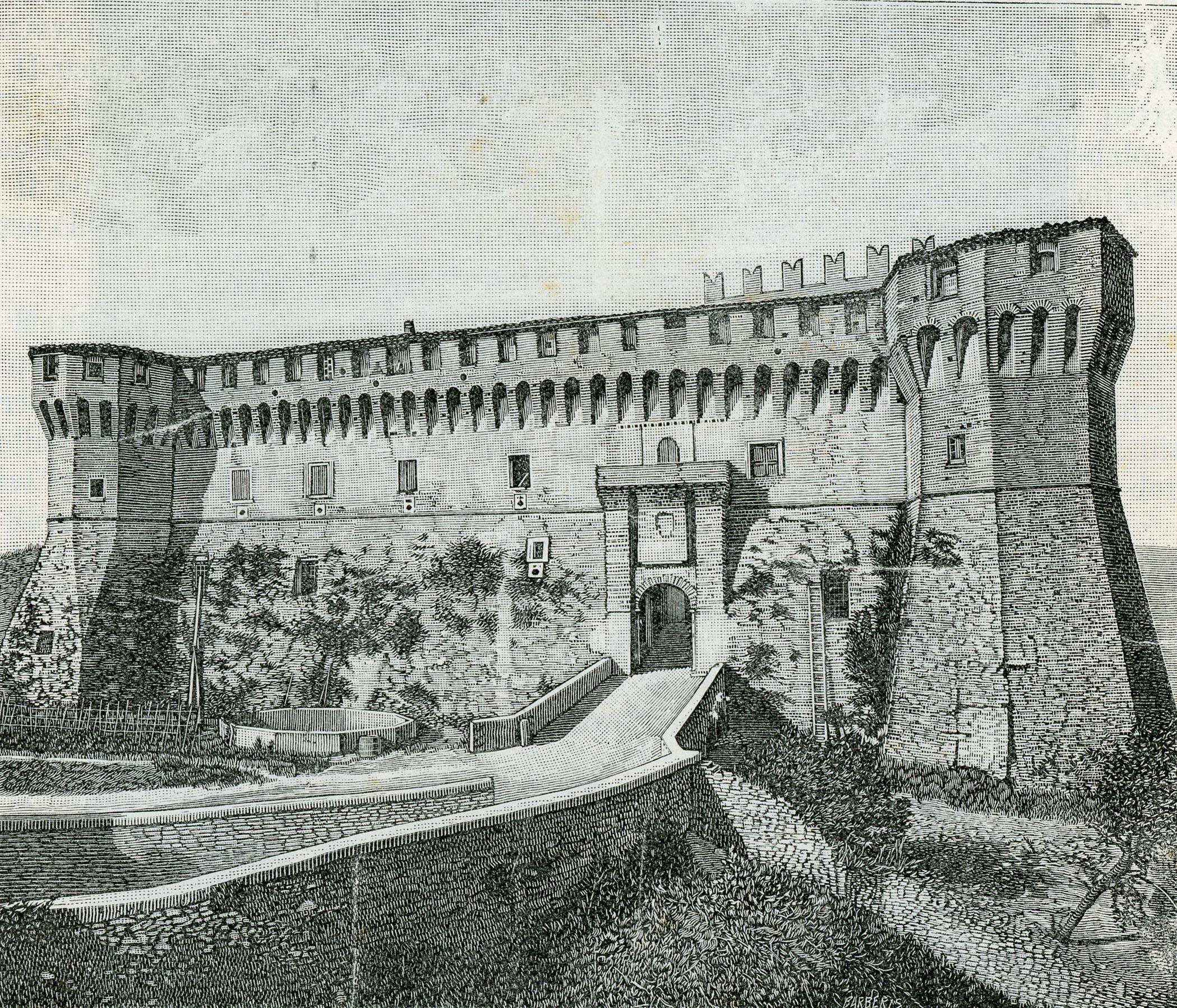
Gradara Castle in 1898

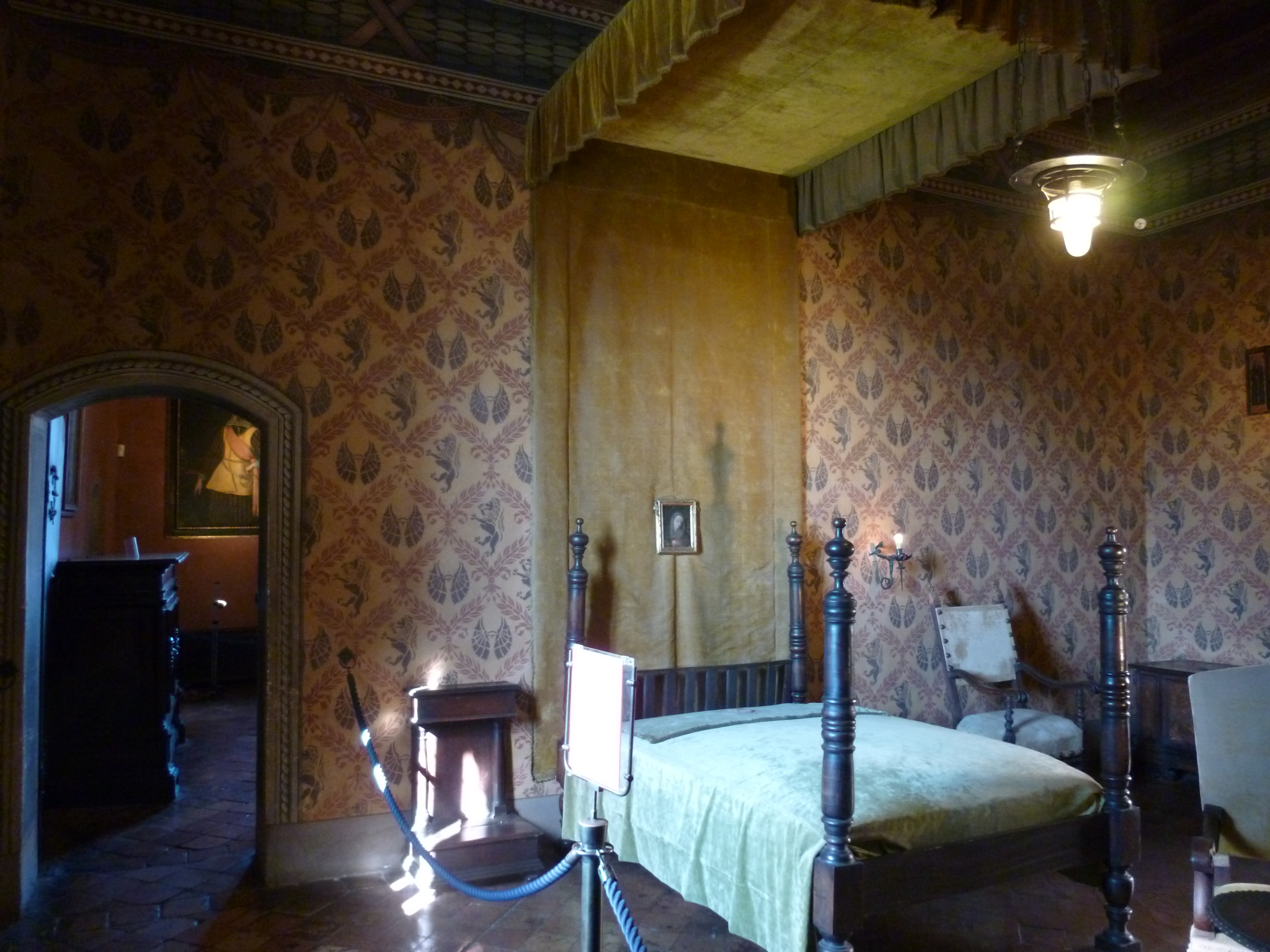
Rocca of Gradara
