= Giovanni Malatesta =

Italian noble (died 1304)

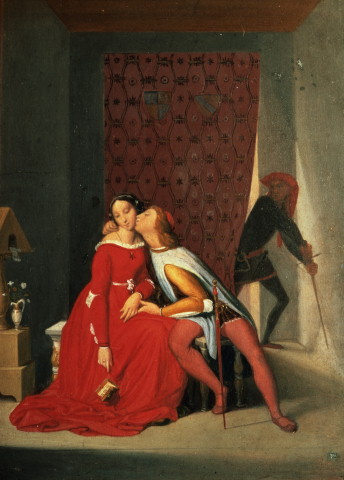
Gianciotto Discovers Paolo and Francesca by Jean Auguste Dominique Ingres.

Giovanni Malatesta (died 1304), also known as Giovanni, lo Sciancato ("the Lame"), sometimes also called by the diminutive Gianciotto, was the second son of Malatesta da Verucchio of Rimini.

== Biography ==
From 1275 onwards he played an active part in the Romagnole Wars and factions. He is chiefly famous for the domestic tragedy of 1285, recorded in Dante's Inferno: upon finding his wife, Francesca da Polenta (Francesca da Rimini), in adulterous embrace with his own brother (Paolo Malatesta), he killed them both with his own hands.

He captured Pesaro in 1294, and ruled it as podestà until his death.

== See also ==
- 1308–1321 Divine Comedy. (Inferno, Canto V), Dante

== Sources ==
- Gardner, Edmund (1913). "House of Malatesta" . In Herbermann, Charles (ed.). Catholic Encyclopedia. New York: Robert Appleton Company.

Preceded by to the Papal States	Lord of Pesaro; 1294–1304	Succeeded by Pandolfo I Malatesta
