= The Maiden Kissed by the Ghost =

Sculpture by Auguste Rodin

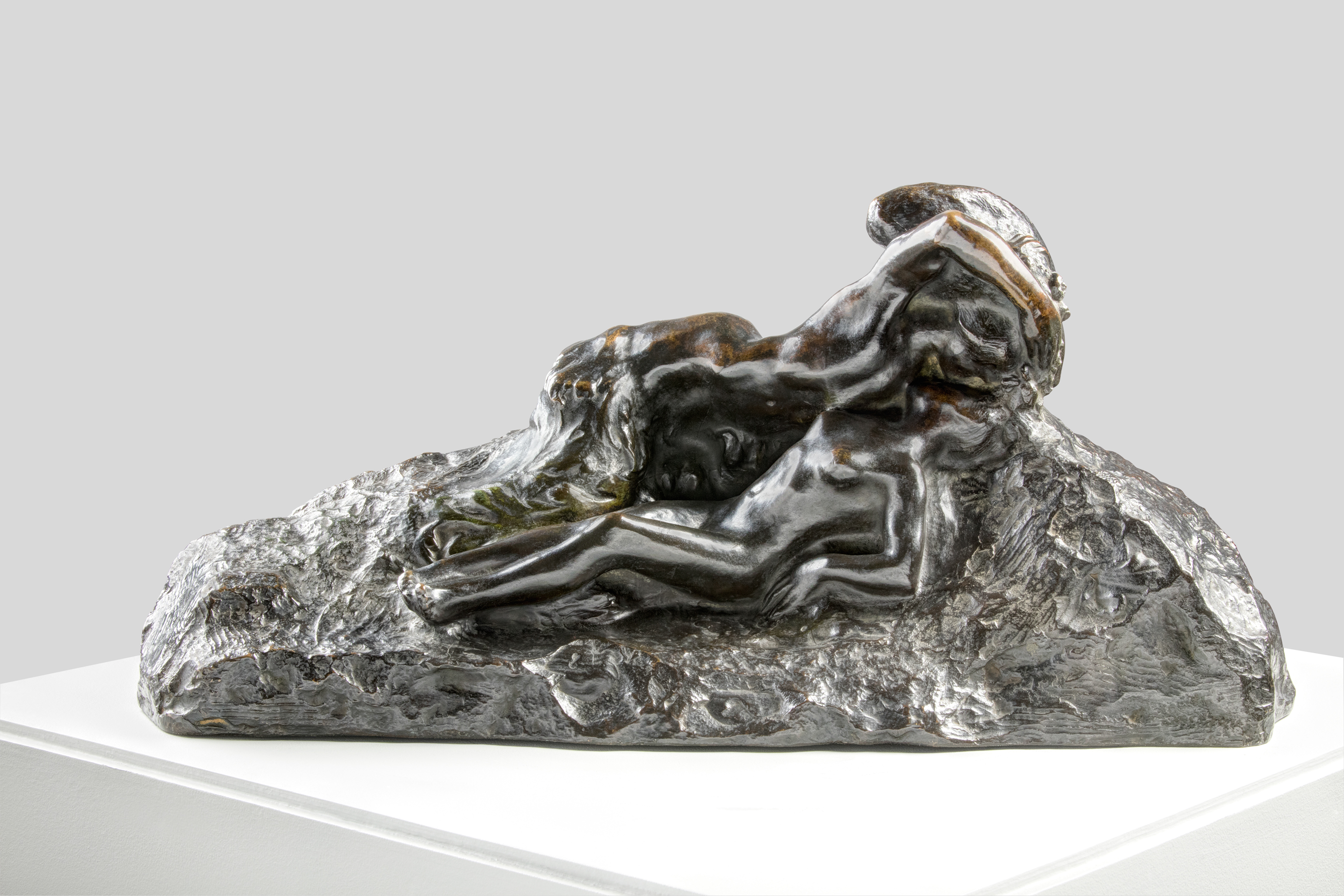
- The Museo Soumaya version.
- Artist: Auguste Rodin
- Year: 1880
- Medium: Bronze

The Maiden Kissed by the Ghost (known by the artist as Le baiser du fantôme et la demoiselle (Note: The Kiss of the Phantom and the Maiden) or Le Rêve (Note: The Dream, possibly referring to Sigmund Freud and his theory of the unconscious mind.) ) is an 1880 sculpture by the French artist Auguste Rodin. It was first exhibited at his fourteenth exhibition, hosted by the National Society Salon. One of the marble versions of the work is now in the Museo Soumaya in Mexico City.

It shows a winged man above a young woman, who tries not to return his kiss. The work shows Rodin's admiration for Michelangelo's treatment of the human form and draws on The Divine Comedy as well as the story of Orpheus and descriptions of the underworld by Hesiod. He also particularly drew on lines 25-30 and 39-40 in The Horseman, poem 23 in the 1861 edition of Charles Baudelaire's Les Fleurs du Mal:

Je plongerai ma tête amoureuse d'ivresse
Dans ce noir océan où l'autre est enfermé;
Et mon esprit subtil que le roulis caresse
Saura vous retrouver, ô féconde paresse,
Infinis bercements du loisir embaumé!
(...)
N'es-tu pas l'oasis où je rêve, et la gourde
Où je hume à longs traits le vin du souvenir? (Note: I will plunge my head, amorous with intoxication Into this black ocean where the other one is enclosed; And my subtle spirit that the wave caresses Shall find in you, oh fecund laziness, Infinite cradles of embalmed leisure!... Are you not the oasis where I dream, and the gourd From which I gulp down the wine of memory in long draughts?)

Rodin reused the figure of the woman in several other variants such as the Torso of Adele, Eternal Springtime, Paolo and Francesca and The Kiss.

== See also ==
- List of sculptures by Auguste Rodin
