= Paolo and Francesca =

Semi-legendary lovers

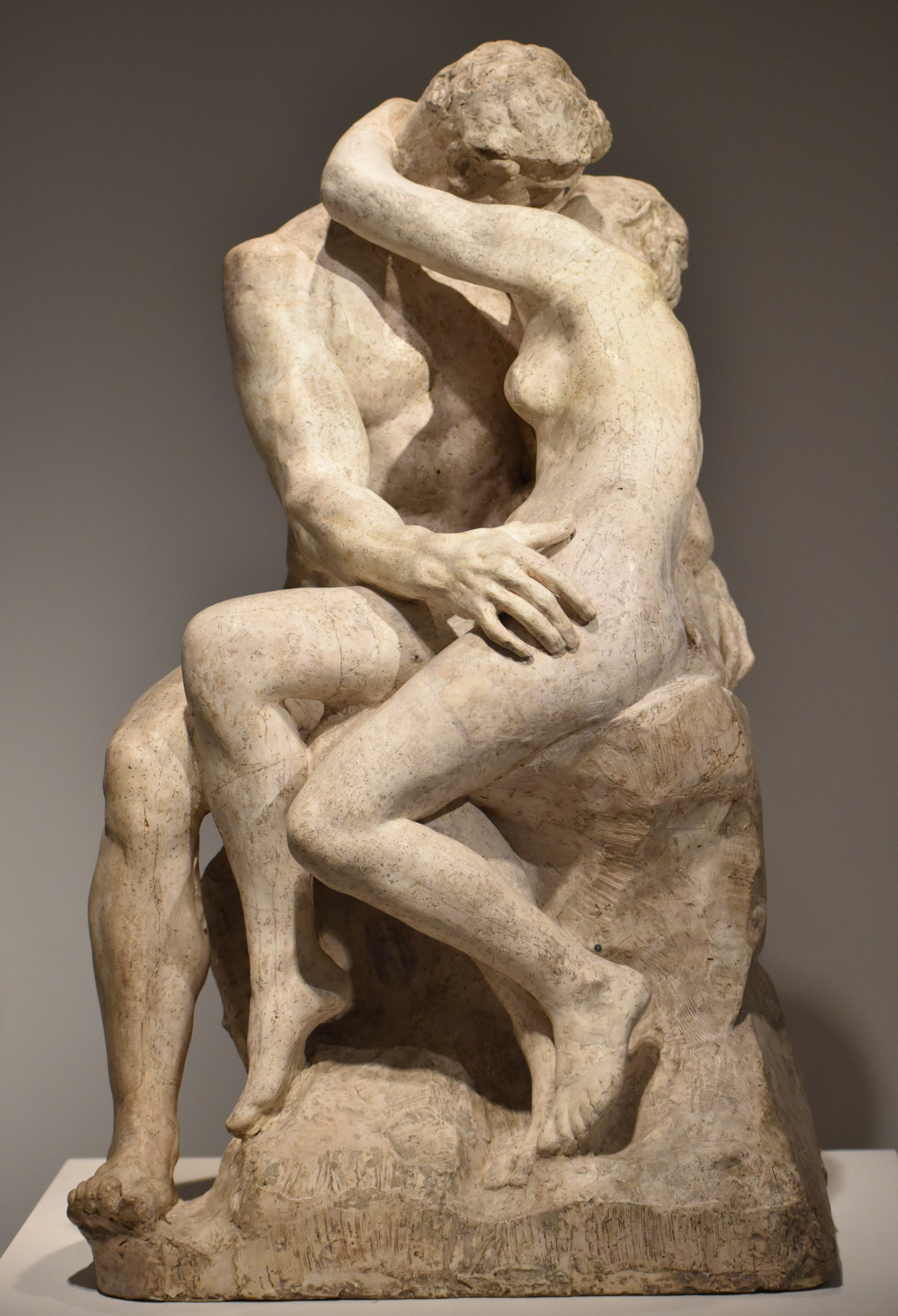
Rodin's The Kiss depicts Paolo and Francesca

Paolo and Francesca are a semi-legendary damned-by-lust romantic couple prominently featured in Dante's Inferno. Paolo and Francesca may refer to:

- Paolo Malatesta and Francesca da Rimini

== Derivative artworks, listed chronologically ==
- Francesca da Rimini and Paolo Malatesta Appraised by Dante and Virgil, 19th-century series of paintings by Ary Scheffer
- Paolo and Francesca, 19th-century series of paintings by Jean-Auguste-Dominique Ingres
- Paolo and Francesca da Rimini, 1855 painting by Gabriel Rossetti
- La morte di Francesca da Rimini e di Paolo Malatesta, 1870 painting by Alexandre Cabanel
- Paolo and Francesca, 1880s sculptural work by Auguste Rodin
- Paolo e Francesca, 1950 Italian melodramatic film

== See also ==
- Francesca da Rimini (disambiguation)
- Second circle of hell
