= Kate Fowler Tutt =

British headmistress (1868–1954)

Kate Fowler-Tutt
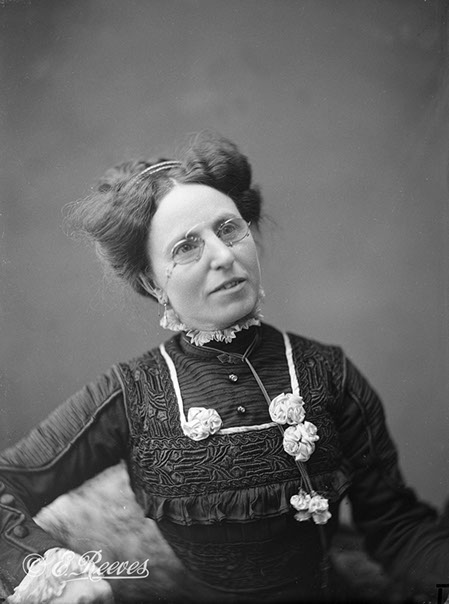
- in 1915 by the Lewes company "E. Reeves"
- Born: 1868; Brighton
- Died: 27 December 1954 (aged 85–86); Brighton
- Occupations: headteacher and local politician
- Known for: headteacher (and involvement with The Kiss)

Kate Matilda Fowler-Tutt (1868–1954) was an English headmistress, town councillor and suffragist who was reputedly involved with the removal of Auguste Rodin's sculpture of The Kiss from Lewes Town Hall in 1917.

== Life ==
She was born in 1868 and her father was a butcher in Brighton. She credited her grandmother with ensuring that she had a good education and she became a teacher. She moved in 1892 to Lewes, East Sussex, where she was the headteacher of South Malling Elementary School. In 1913 she became the headteacher of Central Senior Girls School (later the Mountfield Road Senior Girls' School). She retired from teaching in 1924 and in that year was elected to Lewes Town Council, serving continuously for 21 years.

In 1917 Lewes Council decided that it could not ensure the safety of Auguste Rodin's The Kiss which had been stored and sometimes displayed in Lewes Town Hall. It has been reported that this was because of protests by Fowler-Tutt but later investigation has found no documentary evidence for this narrative.

During the Second World War she continued to give talks about women's citizenship and she campaigned to ensure that children who had been evacuated received the same quality of education as local children in Lewes.

In 1999 The Kiss returned briefly to be exhibited again in Lewes Town Hall. In 2016 Frances Stenlake published research which found that Fowler-Tutt's reputation as a prudish spinster was unfounded. She was historically accused of having the statue removed but it was the council's decision based on their inability to ensure the statue's safety.

In 2018 Lewes was celebrating 100 years of some British women being able to vote and Fowler-Tutt was recognised for her leadership.
