= Eternal Springtime =

Sculpture by Auguste Rodin

- L'eternel printemps (French)
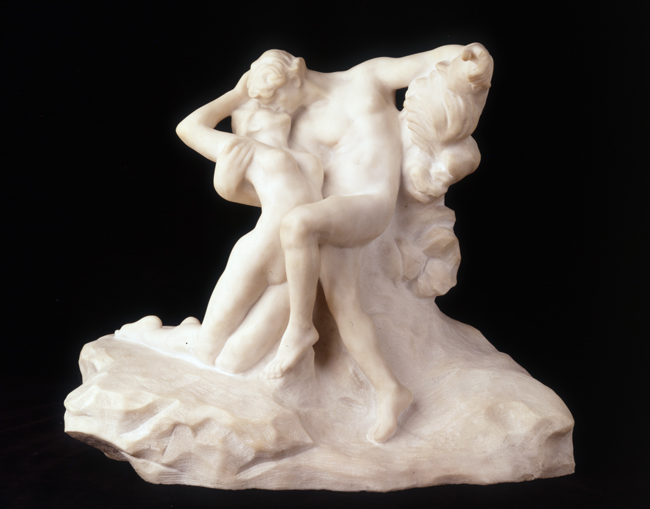
- Marble version of Eternal Springtime
- Artist: Auguste Rodin
- Year: 1884
- Type: Sculpture
- Medium: Marble, bronze

Eternal Springtime (French: L'Éternel Printemps) is a c. 1884 sculpture by the French artist Auguste Rodin, depicting a pair of lovers. It was created at the same time as The Gates of Hell and originally intended to be part of it. One of its rare 19th-century original casts belongs to the permanent collection of Calouste Gulbenkian Museum. One of its largest marble versions belongs to the National Museum of Decorative Arts in Buenos Aires, Argentina.

== Gates of Hell ==
Rodin originally conceived of Eternal Springtime as part of The Gates of Hell, one of the representations of Paolo Malatesta and Francesca da Polenta, but did not include it there because the happiness expressed by the lovers did not seem appropriate to the theme. The Kiss, another famous sculpture by the artist, shares the same origin, but unlike The Kiss in Eternal Springtime the man dominates the composition, sustaining the arching body of his lover who joins him in a passionate kiss.

== Description ==
Rodin took the woman's torso, with its arched pose, from the Torso of Adele that appears in the upper left corner of the tympanum on The Gates of Hell; the model was Adele Abruzzesi, originally from Italy, and for the man Lou Tellegen. However, at the time of his creation of Eternal Springtime, he was in a romantic relationship with Camille Claudel, and Reine-Marie Paris, the granddaughter of Claudel's brother Paul Claudel, has suggested that traces of Camille can be discerned in the woman of this piece and in other female figures prominent in works Rodin created in the mid-1880s.

== Versions ==
The work was reproduced several times in bronze and marble. A marble version dating to c. 1901 was sold at auction in May 2016 for a then record-breaking $20 million.

One of Rodin’s earliest versions, cast in 1898 by Alexis Rudier's Foundry, which worked directly with Rodin, was bought in 1913 by Calouste Gulbenkian and nowadays is available to public access in his museum. An 1884 version is now on display at the National Museum of Decorative Arts, bought when the palace was a private residence around 1911.

== Gallery ==
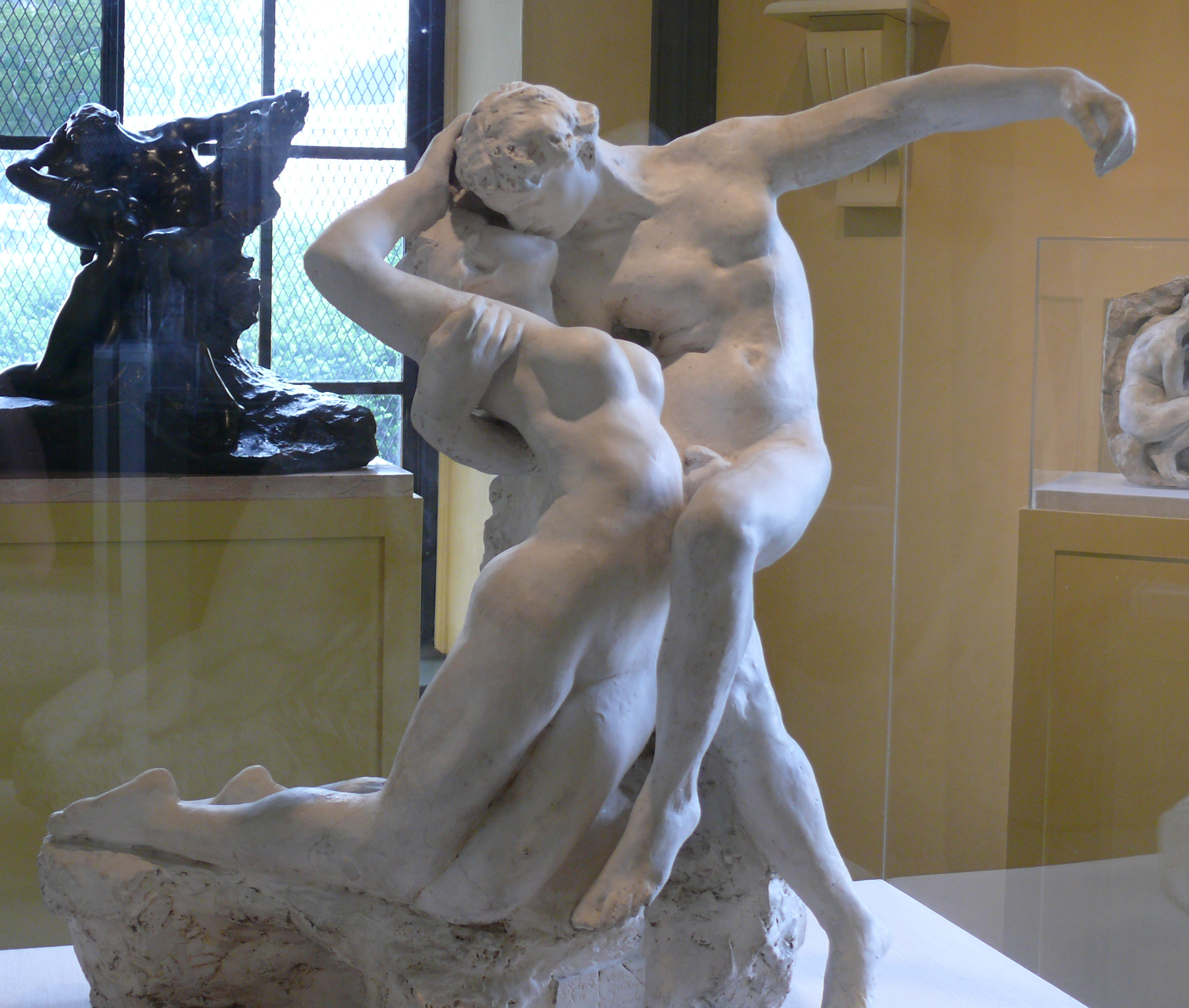
Eternal Springtime in marble at the Rodin Museum

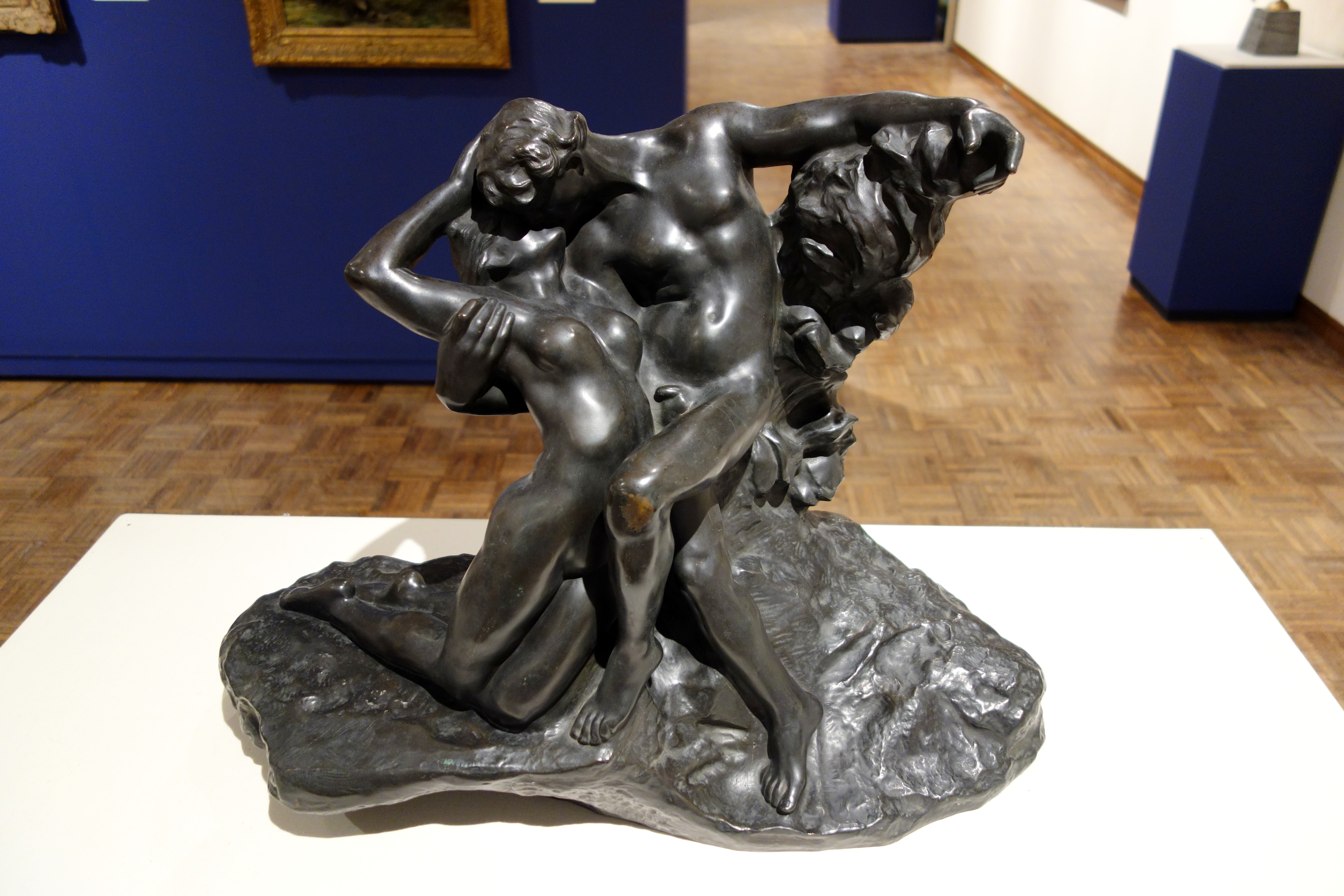
A bronze copy at the Huntington Museum of Art

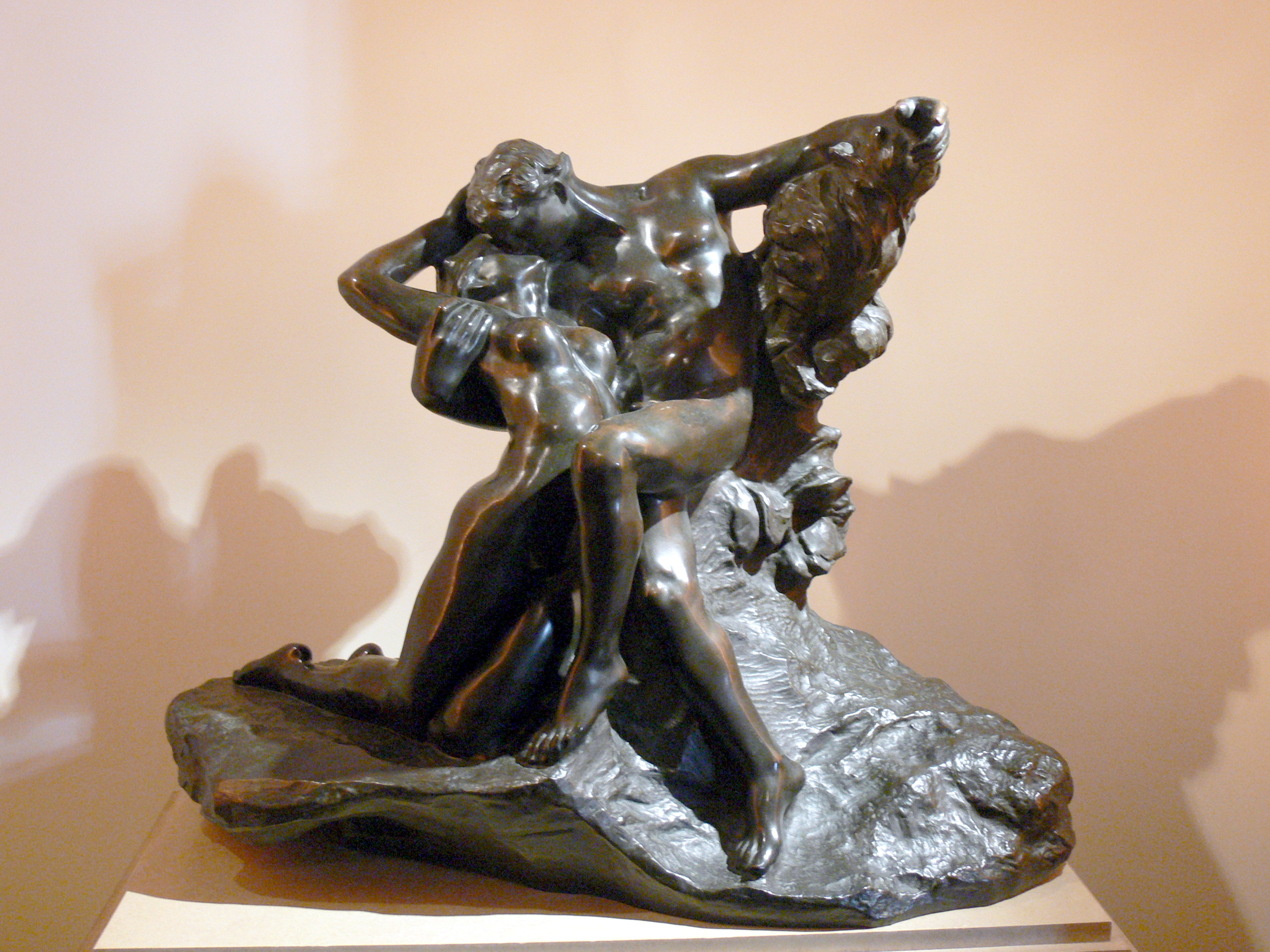
Copy at the Philbrook Museum of Art

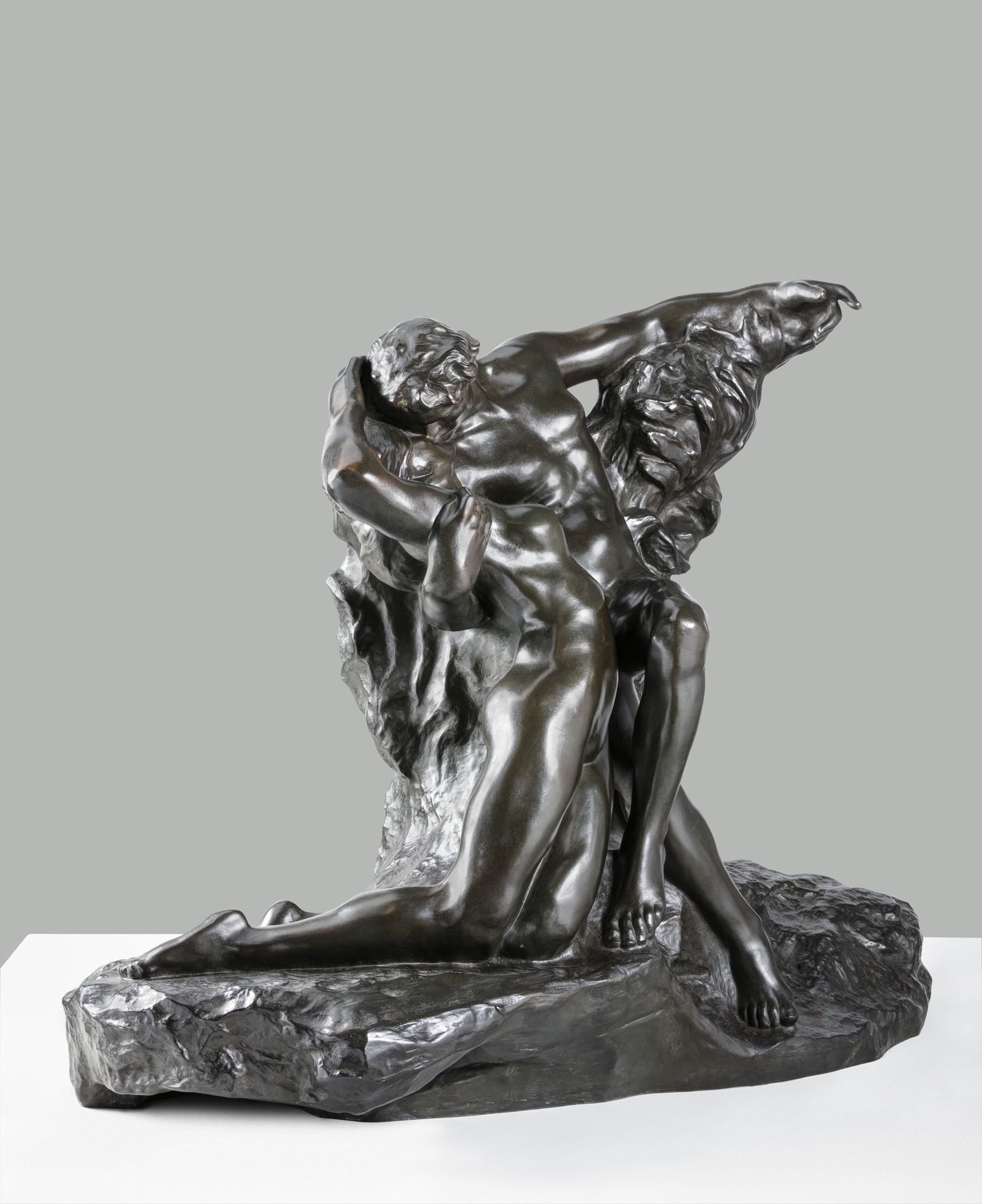
Bronze cast at Museo Soumaya

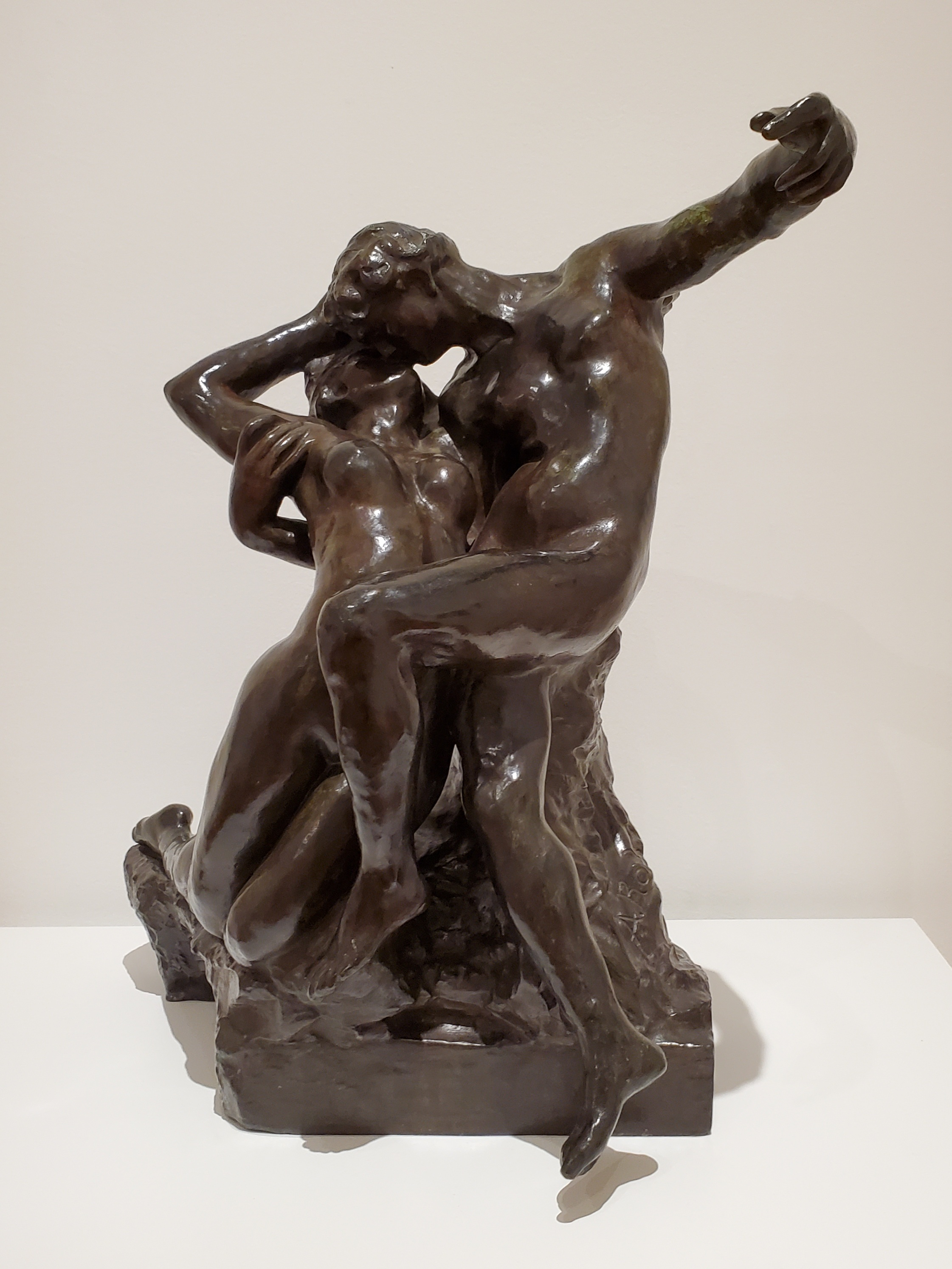
Bronze cast at the High Museum of Art
