= Lewes Town Hall =

Municipal building in Lewes, East Sussex, England

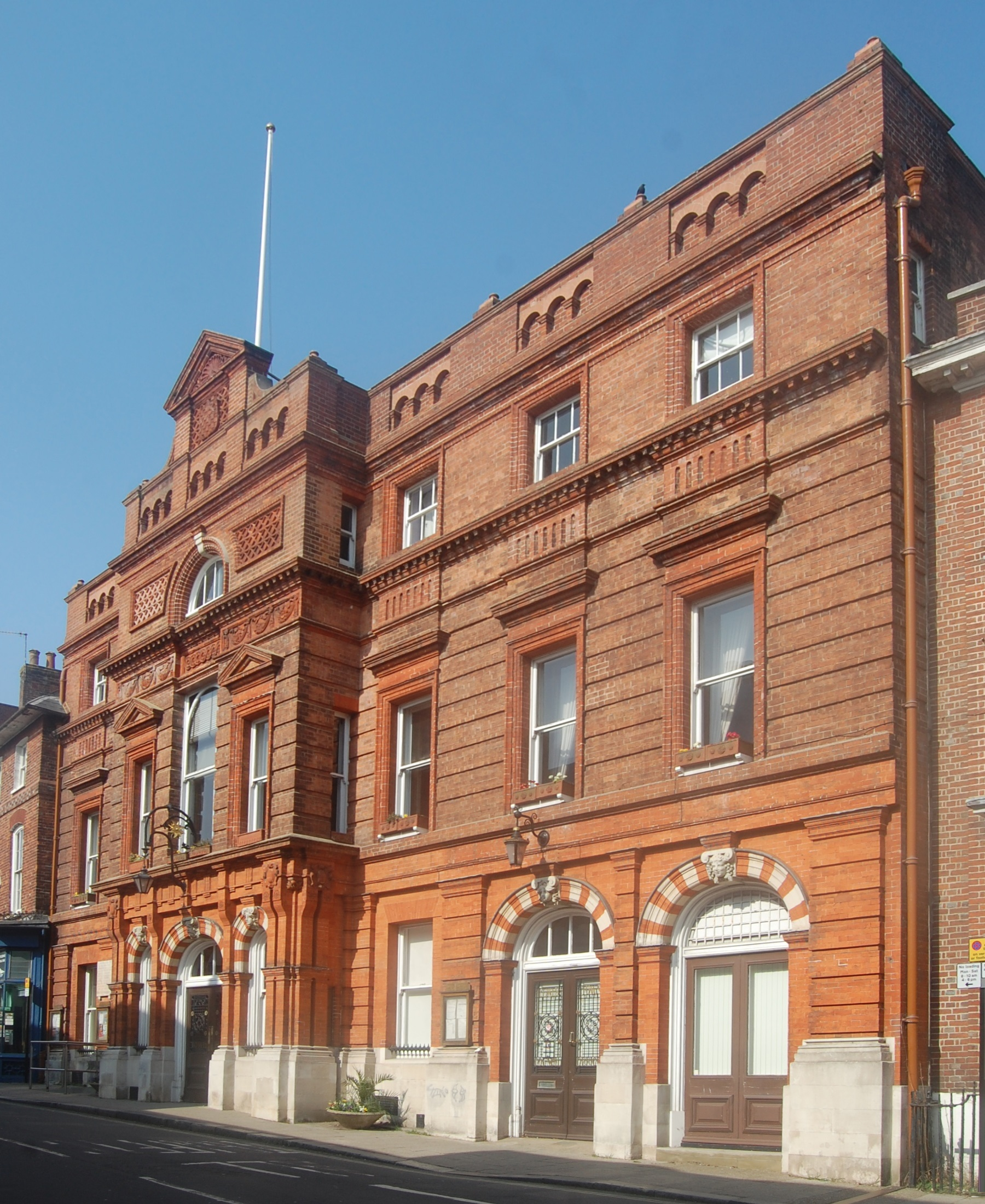
- Lewes Town Hall

- Shown in East Sussex
- 50.8736°N 0.0104°E
- Location: High Street, Lewes

History
- Built: 1893

Site notes
- Architect: Samuel Denman
- Architectural style: Baroque style

Listed Building – Grade II
- Official name: Town Hall
- Designated: 25 February 1952
- Reference no.: 1353072

Lewes Town Hall is a municipal building in the High Street in Lewes, East Sussex, England. The structure, which is the meeting place of Lewes Town Council, is a Grade II listed building.

== History ==
=== Star Inn ===
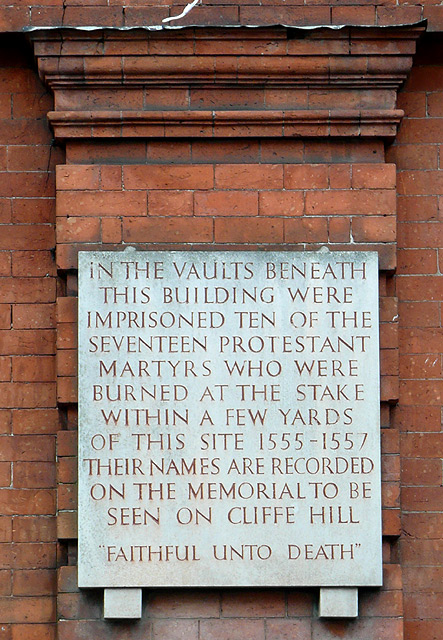
Memorial to the Protestant martyrs

In the medieval period, the site of the town hall was occupied by a large property with a barrel-vaulted undercroft belonging to Lewes Priory but by the mid-16th century it was occupied by a public house known as the Star Inn. Ten Protestant martyrs who were faithful to their cause during the reign of the Catholic monarch, Queen Mary, were held in the undercroft and then burnt at the stake in front of the Star Inn during the Marian Persecutions of 1555–1557. These martyrs are still remembered today by the Lewes Bonfire Society.

In 1732 the local MP, Thomas Sergison, acquired the Star Inn and converted it into his campaign headquarters; the modifications including the construction of a new façade in the Georgian style, the installation of a grand staircase, which had been recovered from his former mansion at Slaugham, and the creation of a large assembly room. Visitors to the Star Inn around that time included the Prince of Wales who had dinner with the Duke of Chartres there in 1784, and the novelist, Jane Austen, who arrived in 1803 and found inspiration from her visit to use the inn for a scene in her unfinished novel, The Watsons.

In the 1840s a sizeable corn exchange was built next to the inn.

=== The first Town Hall ===
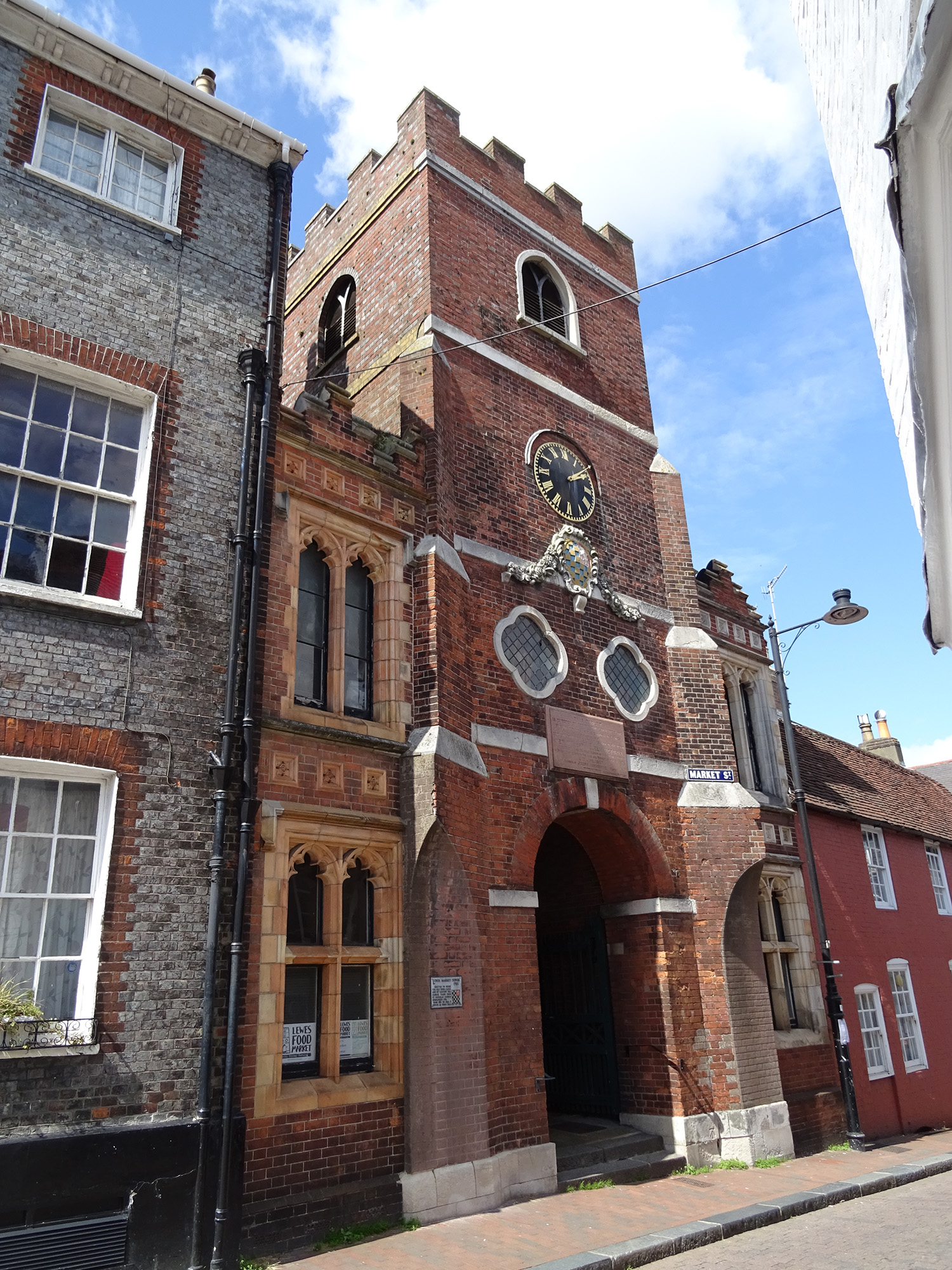
Lewes Market Tower served as the Town Hall from 1881-1893.

The town was incorporated as a municipal borough in 1881. For the next twelve years, the Market Tower (around the corner from the Star Inn) served as the Town Hall. The tower was built in 1792 to house the town clock and bell (they had previously been accommodated in the nearby tower of St Nicholas's Church, which by then was ruinous and was soon afterwards demolished); it also served as the town gaol. The medieval bell (known as 'Old Gabriel') was customarily tolled at the opening and closing of the produce market (the market had been moved here from the Castlegate area in 1791). In 1872, by which time the market had ceased to operate, the Market Commissioners handed the tower over to the town's civic officers, the High Constables. They built a room, 30 ft (9.1 m) by 20 ft (6.1 m), to the rear of the tower, to accommodate public meetings; the cost of the building was met by public subscription. In June 1881, when the Borough charter was awarded, the senior Constable became Mayor and the room became the Town Hall. In the 1880s the narrow wings either side of the tower were rebuilt as offices for Borough officials; but larger premises were needed and by 1883 the feasibility began to be explored of purchasing the Star Inn.

=== The new Town Hall ===
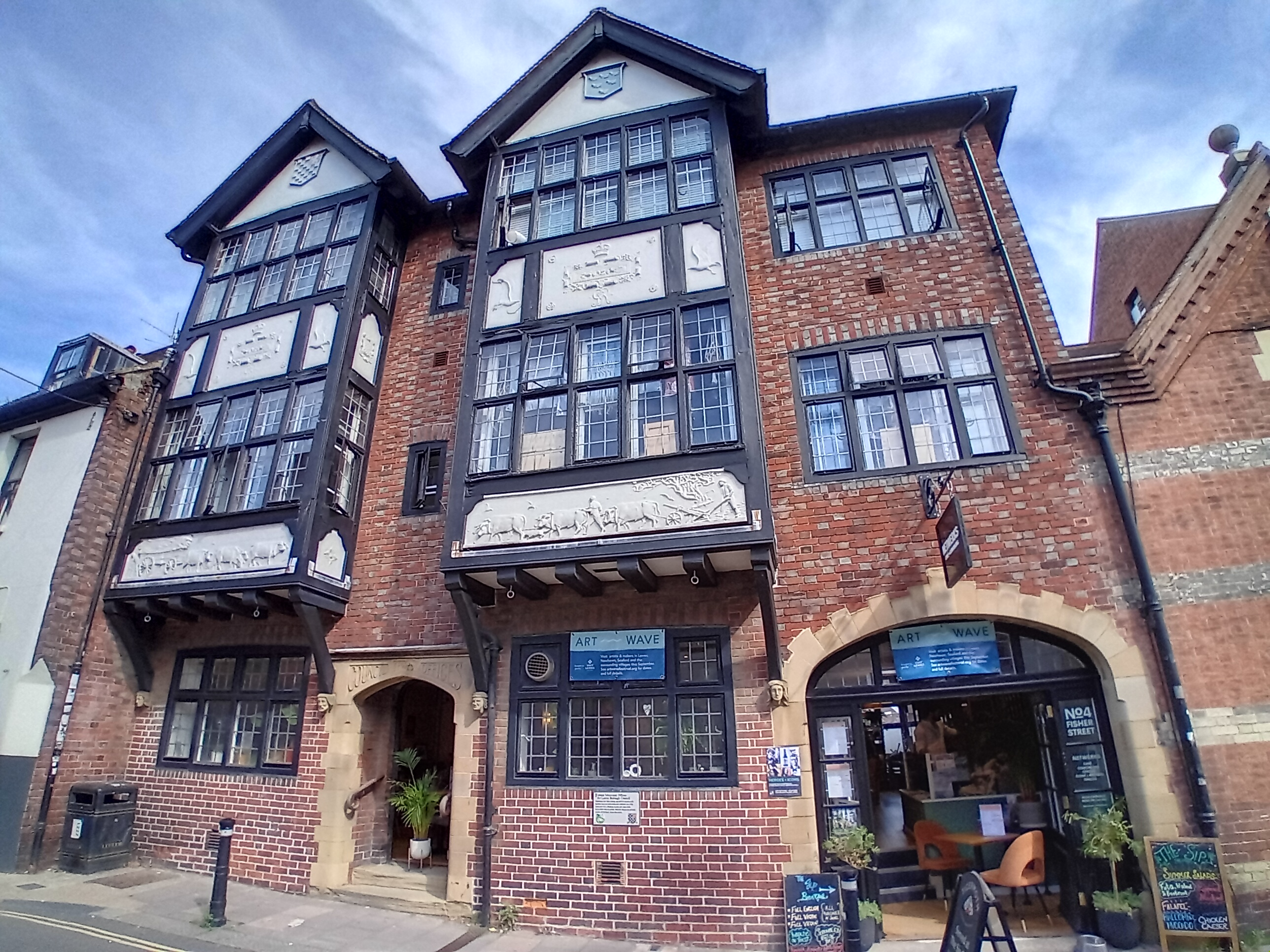
Council Offices extension, completed 1913

In 1890 and the council acquired both the Star Inn and the adjacent corn exchange to facilitate the construction of its new headquarters. An extensive programme of works, which involved the erection of a new façade constructed in red brick with terracotta dressings and the preservation of the undercroft and the grand staircase, was undertaken to a design by Samuel Denman in the Baroque style and completed in 1893. The new design involved an asymmetrical main frontage with eight bays facing onto the High Street; the central section of three bays, which slightly projected forward, featured a wide doorway flanked by two narrow windows and by pilasters supporting an entablature. There was a recessed central window flanked by two pedimented sash windows on the first floor and a Diocletian window on the second floor as well as a parapet and a central aedicula feature at roof level. Inside, Sergison's fashionable Georgian assembly-room was adapted to become the Council Chamber. Further back (extending alongside the corn exchange over what had been the inn's kitchens and stable yard), a new assembly hall was built, which stretched right back along Fisher Street.

The complex was expanded when council offices, designed in the arts and crafts style by Rowland Hawke Halls, were erected to the north of the assembly hall in 1913, facing Fisher Street; it incorporated plaster relief panels sculpted by local artist George Banksart with scenes of rural life.

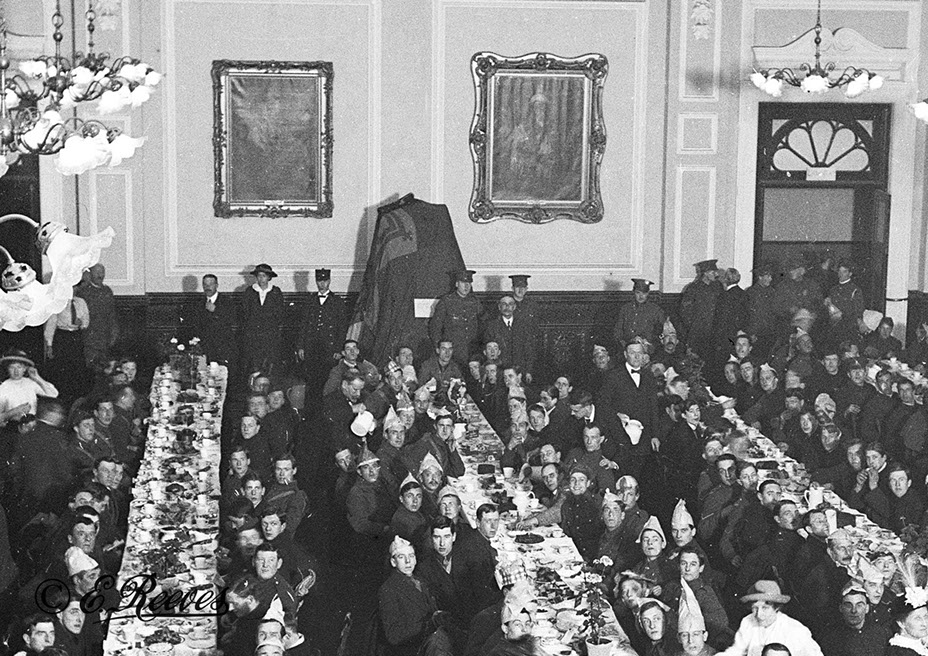
26 December 1915. A Soldiers Dinner in Lewes Town Hall. The Kiss is under the cover at the back

The sculpture, The Kiss, by Auguste Rodin, was placed on display in the assembly room of the town hall during much of the First World War but was removed in 1917, supposedly after a local headmistress, Kate Fowler Tutt, objected to its erotic nature. Later investigation has found no documentary evidence for this narrative.

The building's design was recognised when it was given a Grade II listing in 1952. The complex was used as an events venue and performers included the rock band, Pink Floyd, in January 1968. It continued to serve as the headquarters of the borough council for much of the 20th century but ceased to be the local seat of government when Lewes District Council re-located to Southover House in the 1990s. However, it has remained the offices and meeting place of Lewes Town Council.

In 1999 the Tate's copy of The Kiss was returned on loan to Lewes Town Hall. During the ensuing debate a descendant of the headmistress, Kate Fowler Tutt, noted that she only appears prudish today. In fact she was formidable and the first woman in Lewes to serve on the council.

Works of art in the town hall include two portraits by Nicaise de Keyser of a Syrian Chief, a landscape painting by John Charles Dollman depicting Ditchling Beacon and a painting by T. Hardy depicting the Battle of Lewes. There is also a portrait by Cave Thomas of the first mayor of Lewes, Wynne Edwin Baxter, and a bust by Humphrey Hopper depicting Arthur Wellesley, 1st Duke of Wellington.
