= Ezequiel Viñao =

Argentine-American composer (born 1960)

Ezequiel Viñao (born July 21, 1960 in Buenos Aires) is an Argentine-American composer. He emigrated to the United States in 1980 and studied at the Juilliard School. His compositions include La Noche de las Noches (1989) for string quartet and electronics, which won First Prize at UNESCO's Latin-American Rostrum of Composers in 1993; six Études (1993) for piano solo, which were awarded a Kennedy Center Friedheim Award in 1995; a second string quartet The Loss and the Silence (2004), commissioned by the Juilliard String Quartet and titled with a quote from J.R.R. Tolkien's The Tale of Aragorn and Arwen; The Wanderer (2005) for a cappella voices, commissioned by Chanticleer and Chicago a cappella, and titled for the Old English poem of the same name; and Sirocco Dust (2009), commissioned by the Library of Congress for the St. Lawrence String Quartet. He currently resides in New York City.
