= Paolo and Francesca (Ingres) =

Paintings by Jean-Auguste-Dominique Ingres

Paolo and Francesca is an oil painting on canvas by the French artist Jean-Auguste-Dominique Ingres, produced in seven known versions between 1814 and 1850. It derives from the story of Paolo and Francesca in Dante's Inferno. With Ingres' The Engagement of Raphael, these works represent early examples of the troubador style.

The first painting of the series was commissioned by Caroline Murat, Queen of Naples. Of the seven known versions in oils, that in the Musée des beaux-arts d'Angers is considered the most complete, notably in the exaggerated form of Paolo, whose neck recalls the same artist's Jupiter and Thetis. The frontality of the composition and the details of the room and clothes refer back to the Northern Renaissance.

Ingres also made several finished drawings of the subject, including one he gave to Artaud de Montor in 1816 and another made in 1857.

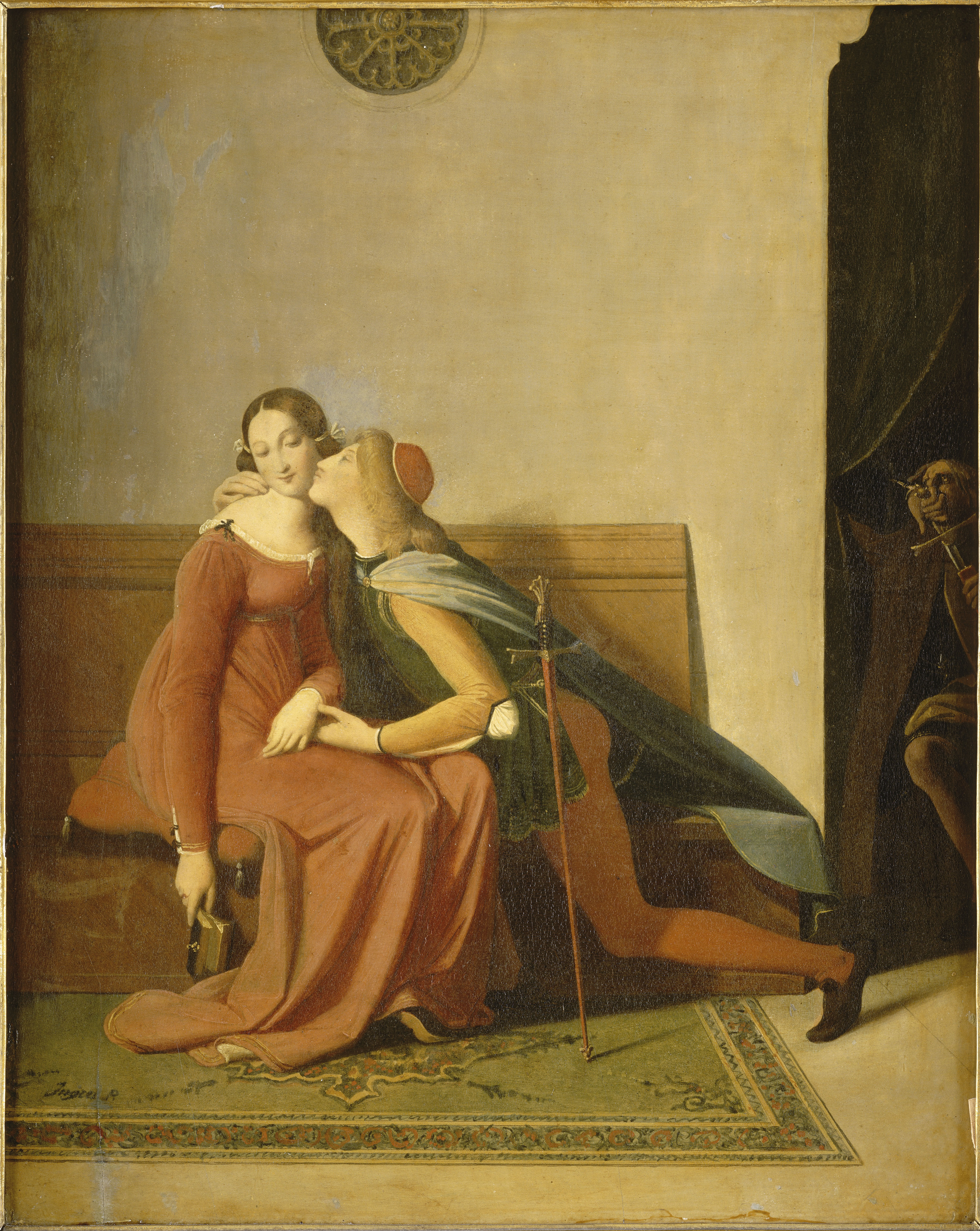
1814, Musée Condé

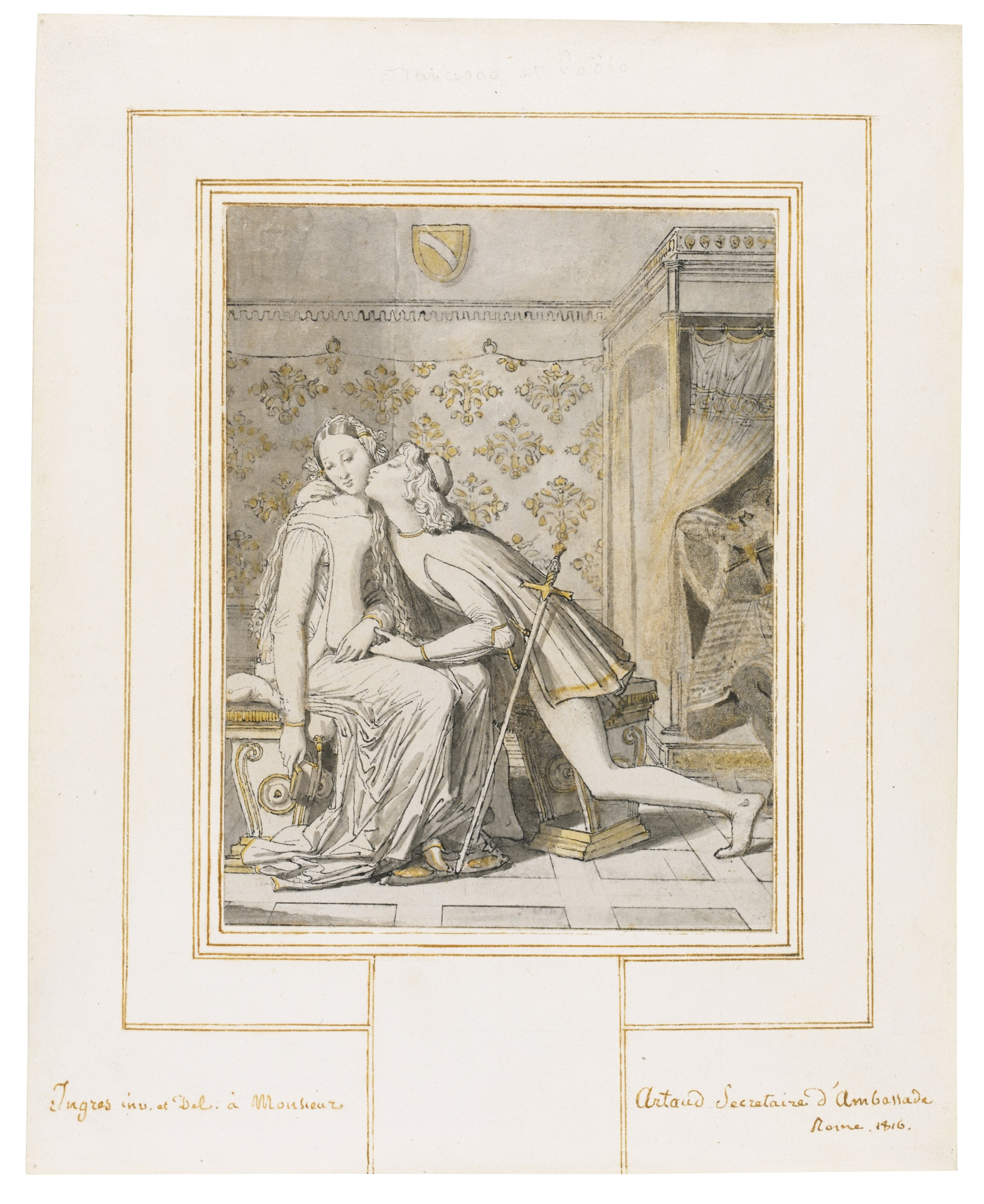
Drawing in pen and ink with wash, 1816

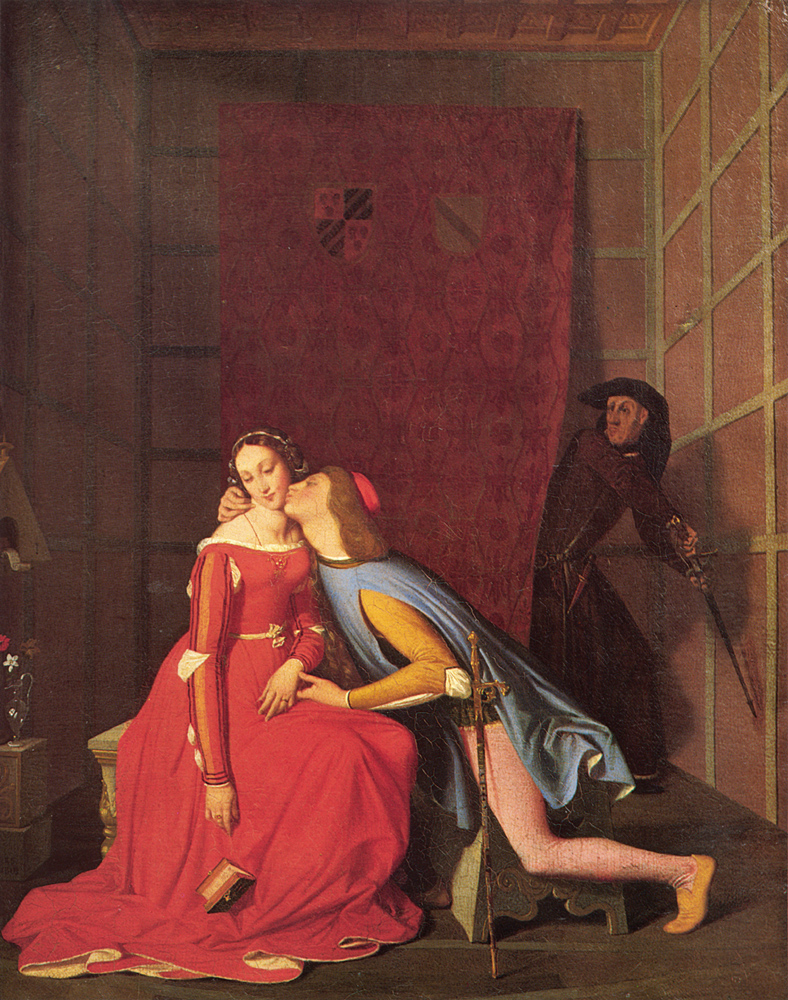
1819, Musée des beaux-arts d'Angers

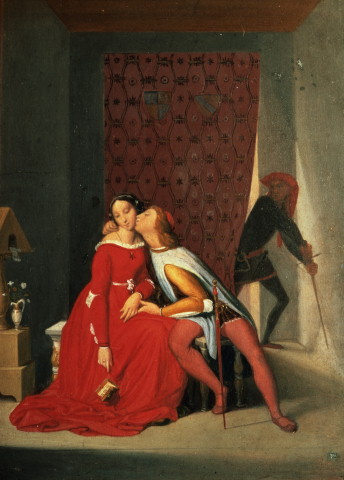
1846, Musee Bonnat

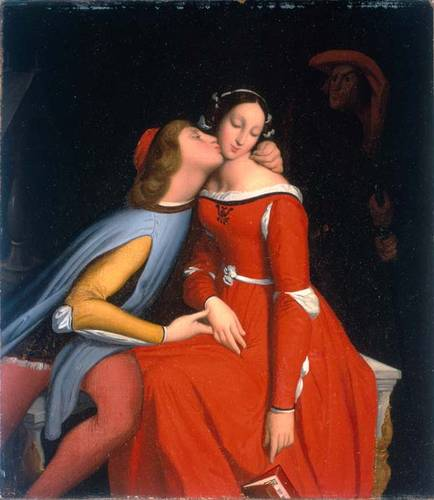
ca. 1856–1860, Museo Soumaya

== Bibliography ==
- Condon, Patricia; Cohn, Marjorie B.; Mongan, Agnes (1983). In Pursuit of Perfection: The Art of J.-A.-D. Ingres. Louisville: The J. B. Speed Art Museum. ISBN 0-9612276-0-5.
- Daniel Ternois, Ingres, Paris, Fernand Nathan, 1980. ISBN 2-09-284-557-8.
- Robert Rosenblum, Ingres, Paris, Cercle d'Art, coll. « La Bibliothèque des Grands Peintres », 1986. ISBN 2-7022-0192-X.
