= Torso of Adele =

Sculpture by Auguste Rodin

Torso of Adèle
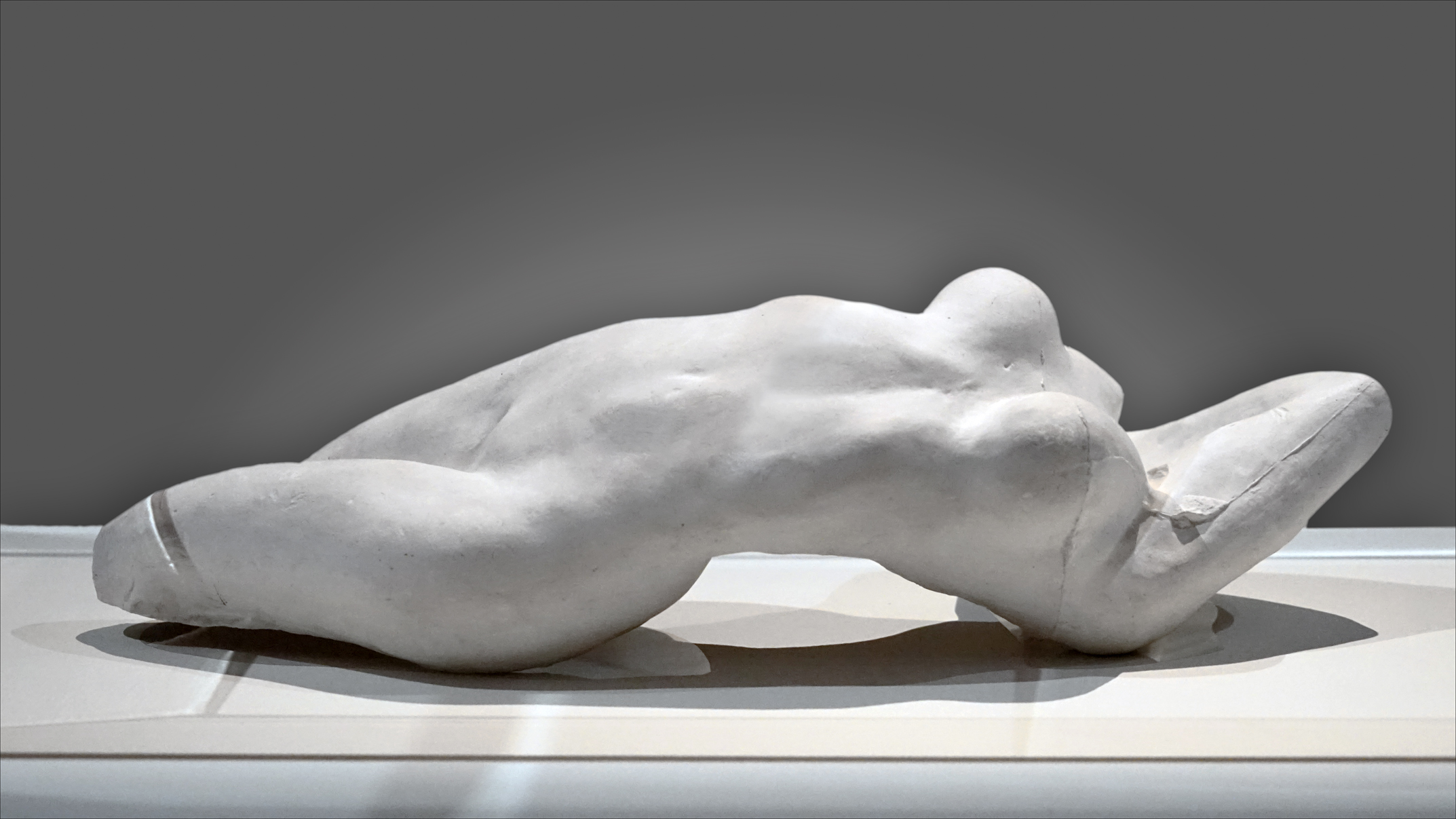
- The work as exhibited at the Cité nationale de l'histoire de l'immigration in 2017
- Artist: Auguste Rodin
- Year: c. 1884
- Type: Sculpture
- Medium: Plaster; Terracotta

Torso of Adele is an 1878-1884 sculpture by the French artist Auguste Rodin, originally modelled in plaster before being worked in terracotta.

== Work ==
Judith Cladel (Rodin's friend and biographer) states that it arose from his study of caryatids. The model was probably the Italian Adèle Abruzzesi, one of Rodin's favourite models. The sculpture was only completed in 1889 by the addition of the legs and left arm, for use in the top left-hand corner of The Gates of Hell. It does not appear in William Elborne's 1887 photographs of The Gates and so Rodin probably added it later. He also used the same torso, with a head added, for the female figures in Eternal Springtime and Illusions Received by the Earth.

== See also ==
- List of sculptures by Auguste Rodin
