= Francesca da Rimini (disambiguation) =

Francesca da Rimini (1255 – c. 1285) was a medieval Italian noblewoman.

Francesca da Rimini may also refer to:

== Art ==
=== Painting ===
- Paolo and Francesca da Rimini an 1855 watercolour by Dante Gabriel Rossetti

=== Orchestral works ===
- Francesca da Rimini (Tchaikovsky), 1876
- Francesca da Rimini (1889/90), a symphonic poem by Antonio Bazzini
- Francesca da Rimini (1892), a symphonic poem by Arthur Foote
- Francesca da Rimini (1899), a symphonic poem by Pierre Maurice
- Paolo e Francesca (1908), the second part of the symphonic poem Dante by Enrique Granados
- Paolo e Francesca (1913), a symphonic poem by Paul von Klenau

=== Operas ===
- Francesca da Rimini (1829) by Pietro Generali
- Francesca da Rimini (1877) by Hermann Goetz
- Francesca da Rimini (1914) by Franco Leoni
- Francesca da Rimini (Mercadante), 1831
- Francesca da Rimini (Rachmaninoff), 1904
- Francesca da Rimini (1831) by Giuseppe Staffa
- Francesca da Rimini (1823) by Feliciano Strepponi
- Françoise de Rimini (1882) by Ambroise Thomas
- Françoise de Rimini (1897) by Auguste Rodin
- Francesca da Rimini (Zandonai), 1914

=== Plays ===
- Francesca da Rimini by George Henry Boker, 1853
- Francesca da Rimini (play), by Gabriele D'Annunzio, 1901
- Francesca da Rimini, a 1902 play by Francis Marion Crawford

== People ==
- Francesca da Rimini (artist) (fl. from 1984), new media artist
