= Paolo and Francesca (Rodin) =

Sculpture by Auguste Rodin

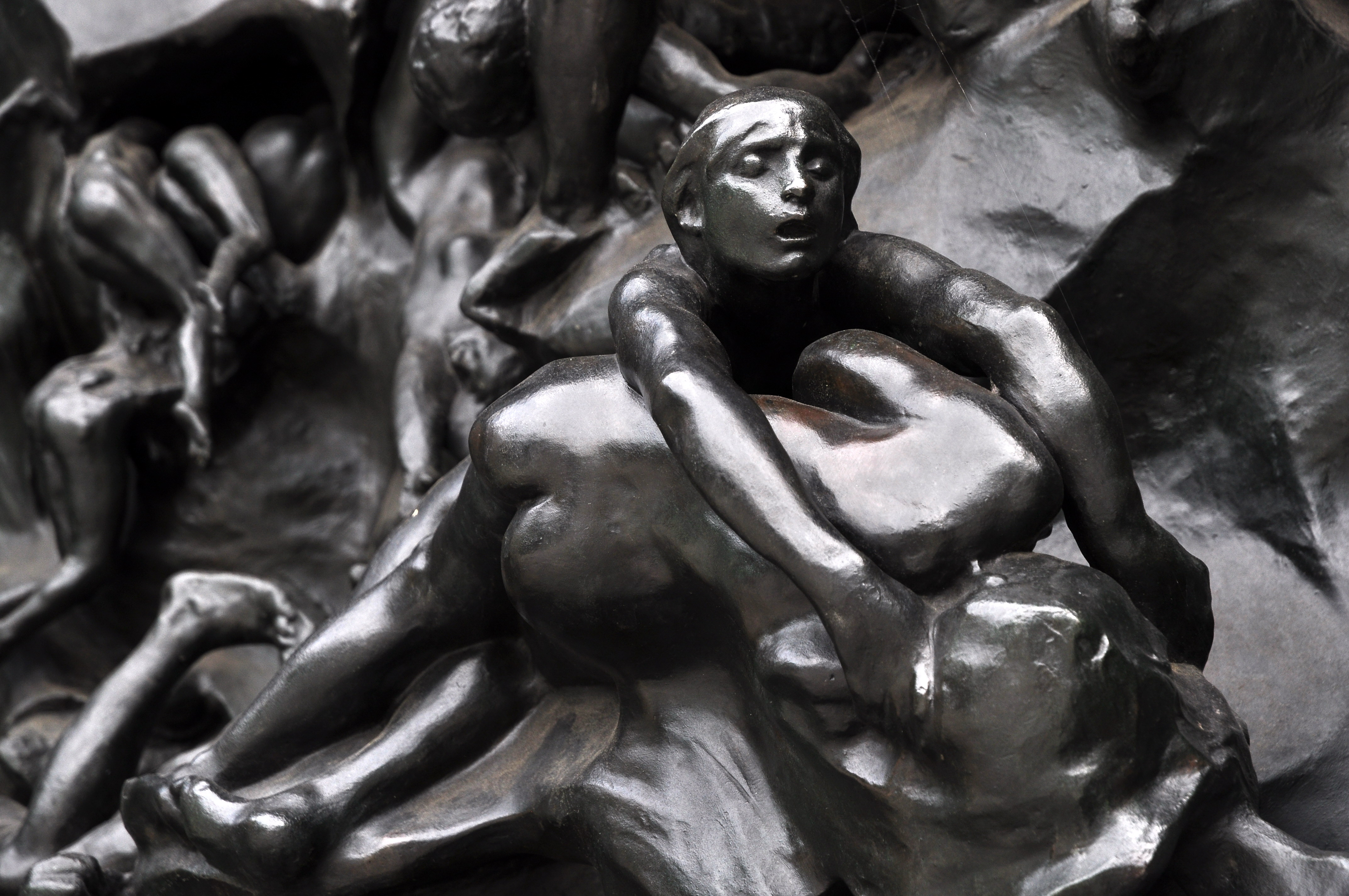
- Artist: Auguste Rodin
- Year: 1885
- Medium: Bronze

Paolo and Francesca is a sculptural group by Auguste Rodin, showing Paolo and Francesca da Rimini, damned lovers from Canto V of Dante's The Divine Comedy.

== Gates of Hell ==
The couple appeared in several of Rodin's initial drawings between 1880 and 1881 for The Gates of Hell. In the first version he placed them in the centre, in a work that later appeared on its own as The Kiss. This piece was removed from Gates by the artist in 1886 and replaced by a new version, closer to the description of the lovers in Dante's text.

== See also ==
- List of sculptures by Auguste Rodin
