= The Kiss (Rodin sculpture) =

Sculpture by Auguste Rodin

- Le Baiser (French)
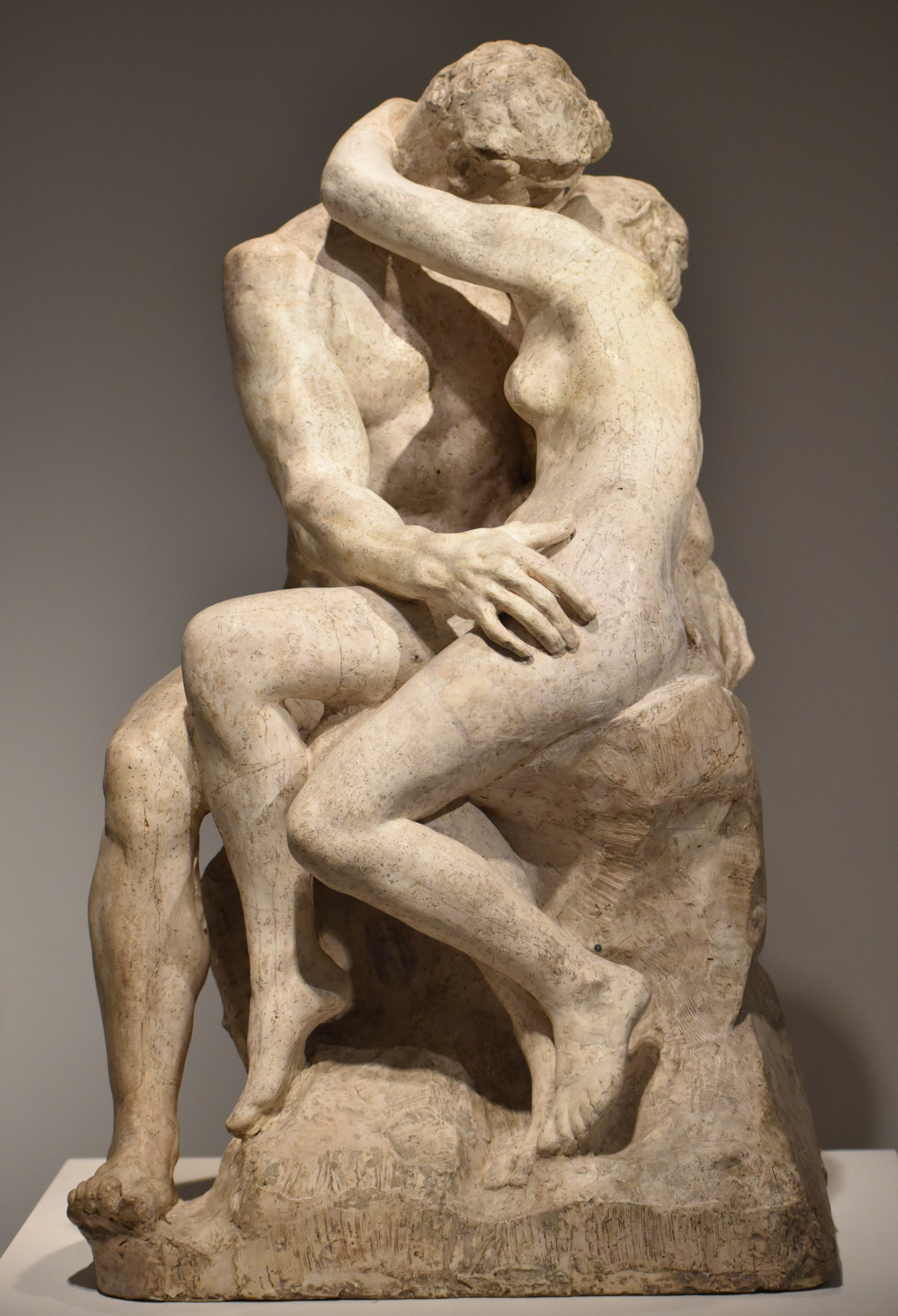
- Artist: Auguste Rodin
- Year: 1882
- Type: Marble
- Dimensions: 181.5 cm × 112.5 cm × 117 cm (71.5 in × 44.3 in × 46 in)
- Location: Paris
- Owner: Musée Rodin

The Kiss (French: Le Baiser) is an 1882 marble sculpture by the French sculptor Auguste Rodin.

The embracing nude couple depicted in the sculpture appeared originally as part of a group of reliefs decorating Rodin's monumental bronze portal The Gates of Hell, commissioned for a planned museum of art in Paris. The couple were later removed from the Gates and replaced with another pair of lovers located on the smaller right-hand column.

== Background ==
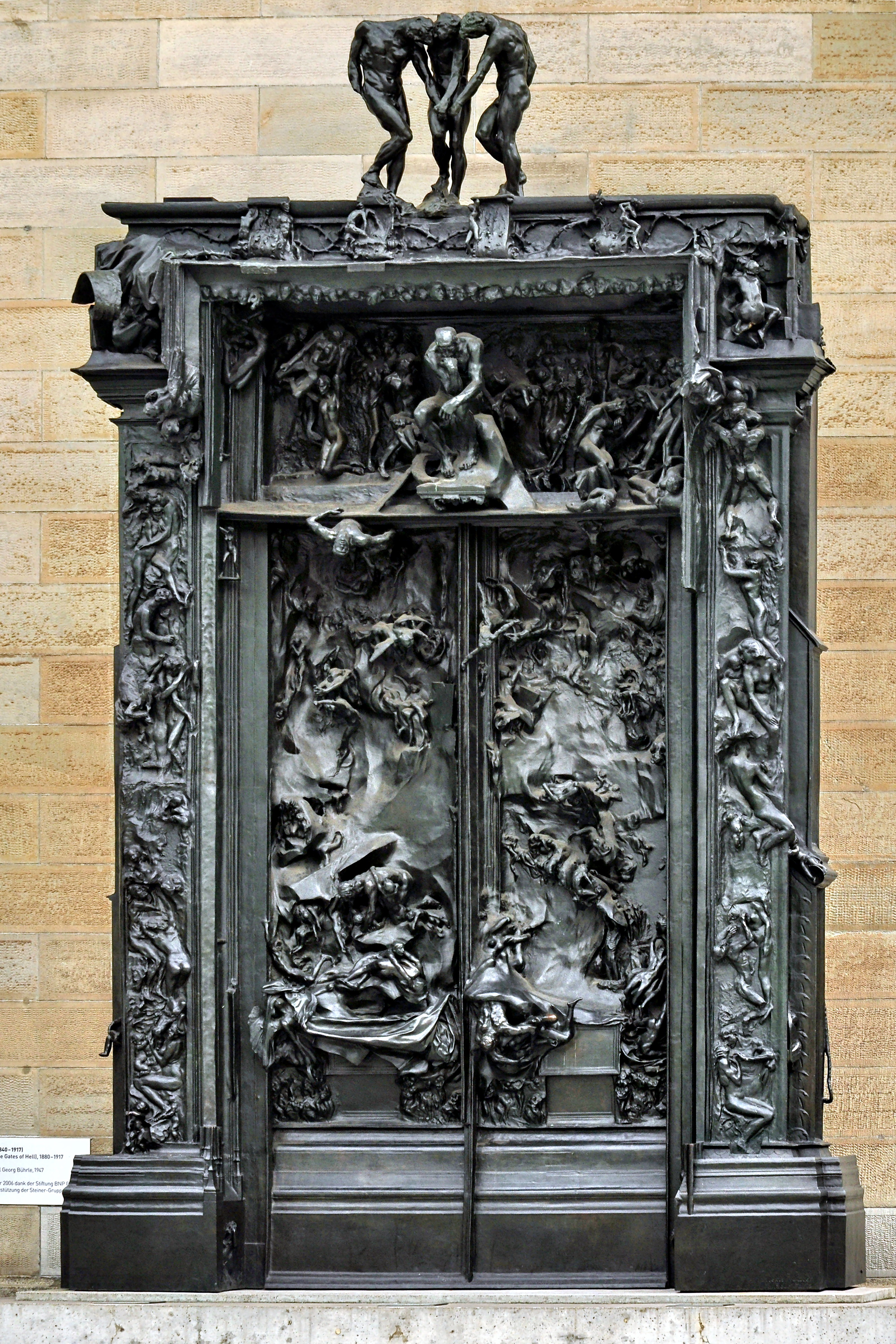
The Gates of Hell, sculpture by Rodin, where the concept for the sculpture originated.

The sculpture, The Kiss, was originally titled Francesca da Rimini, as it depicts the 13th-century Italian noblewoman immortalised in Dante's Inferno (Circle 2, Canto 5) who falls in love with her husband Giovanni Malatesta's younger brother Paolo. Having fallen in love while reading the story of Lancelot and Guinevere, the couple are later discovered and killed by Francesca's husband. In the sculpture, the book can be seen in Paolo's hand. The lovers' lips do not touch in the sculpture, creating further tension within the work, alluding to the potentiality of either the imminent murder of Francesca in her lovers arms or the act of lust itself (her hamartia), existing fleetingly before her infidelity.

When critics first saw the sculpture in 1887, they suggested the less specific title Le Baiser (The Kiss). (Note: The translation of the title into English as kiss is somewhat arguable as in the original French, the term baiser, although it can mean kiss, is usually used in a more vulgar sense to mean fuck or screw)

Rodin indicated that his approach to sculpting women was of homage to them and their bodies, not just submitting to men but as full partners in ardor. The consequent eroticism in the sculpture made it controversial. A bronze version of The Kiss (74 centimetres (29 in) high) was sent for display at the 1893 World's Columbian Exposition in Chicago. The sculpture was considered unsuitable for general display and relegated to an inner chamber with admission only by personal application.

== Small versions ==
Rodin's method of making large sculptures was to employ assistant sculptors to copy a smaller model made from a material which was easier to work than marble. Once they had finished, Rodin himself would put the finishing touches to the larger version.

Before creating the marble version of The Kiss, Rodin produced several smaller sculptures in plaster, terracotta and bronze.

== Large marble carvings ==
=== French commission ===
In 1888, the French government ordered the first large-scale marble version of The Kiss from Rodin for the 1889 Exposition Universelle, but it was publicly displayed for the first time in the Salon de la Société Nationale des Beaux-Arts in 1898. It was so popular that the company Barbedienne offered Rodin a contract to produce a limited number of smaller copies in bronze. In 1900 the statue was moved to the Musée du Luxembourg before being taken to its permanent location, the Musée Rodin, in 1918.

=== Warren's commission ===
In 1900, Rodin made a copy for Edward Perry Warren, an eccentric American collector who lived in Lewes in Sussex, England, with his collection of Greek antiquities and his lover John Marshall. After seeing The Kiss in the Salon de Paris, the painter William Rothenstein recommended it to Warren as a possible purchase, but The Kiss had been commissioned by the French government and was not available for sale. In its place, Rodin offered to make a copy and Warren offered half of its original price (10,000 francs, instead of 20,000), but Rodin would not lower the price. The contract for the commission included that "the genitals of the man must be complete." A previous letter explained that "being a pagan and lover of antiquities", Warren hoped that the genitals of the man would be sculpted prominently in the Classical Greek tradition rather than modestly hidden.

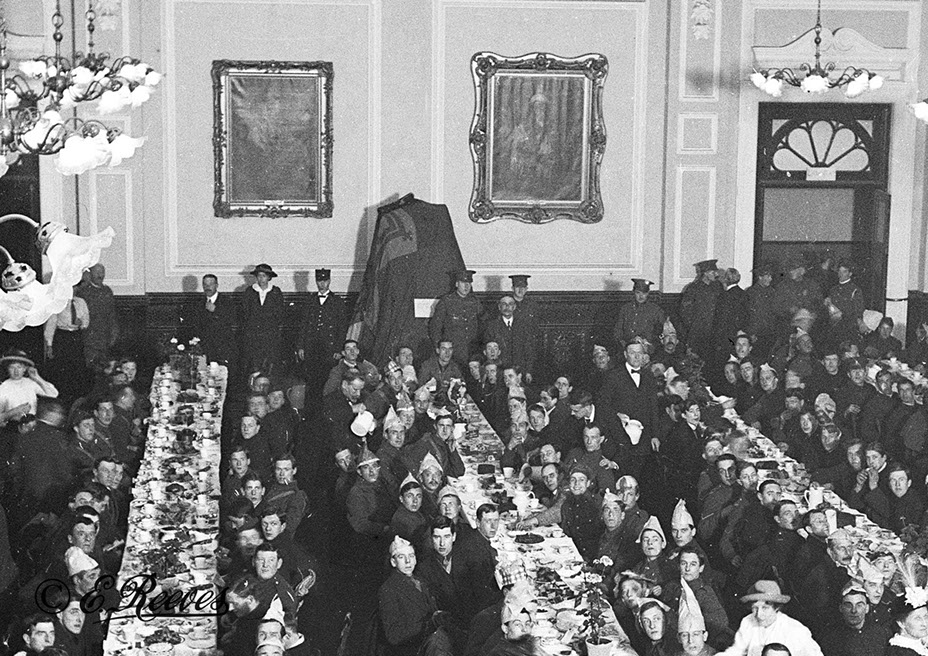
26 December 1915. A Soldiers' Christmas Dinner in Lewes Town Hall. "The Kiss" is under the cover at the back. Photo by E.Reeves Ltd

When the sculpture arrived in Lewes in 1904, Warren placed it in the stables at the back of his home, Lewes House, on School Hill, where it remained for a decade. It is not known whether this location was chosen due to the great size of the sculpture or because it did not fulfil Warren's expectations. In 1914 the sculpture was loaned to the Lewes town council and put on public display in Lewes Town Hall. A number of puritanical local residents, led by headmistress Miss Kate Fowler Tutt, objected to the erotic nature of the sculpture. They were particularly concerned that it might encourage the ardour of the large number of soldiers who were billeted in the town at that time, and successfully campaigned to have the sculpture draped and screened from public view. It was returned to Warren's residence at Lewes House in 1917 where it remained stored in the stable for 12 years until after Warren's death in 1928. The beneficiary of Warren's will, H. Asa Thomas, put the sculpture up for sale with Gorringes, the local auctioneers, but it failed to meet its reserve price and was withdrawn from sale. A few years later it was loaned to the Tate Gallery in London. In 1955 the Tate bought the sculpture for the nation at a cost of £7,500. In 1999 between 5 June and 30 October, The Kiss returned briefly to Lewes as part of an exhibition of Rodin's works. Its permanent home is the Tate Modern, however in September 2007, the work was displayed at the Tate Liverpool, Albert Dock for the duration of the celebrations surrounding both that city's 8th Centenary and Liverpool's European Capital of Culture status in 2008. It was next on loan to Auckland Art Gallery Toi o Tāmaki in Auckland, New Zealand until 16 July 2017. It was loaned to Christchurch Mansion in Ipswich, UK for the 'Kiss and Tell' exhibition running from November 2018 to April 2019.

=== Jacobsen's commission ===
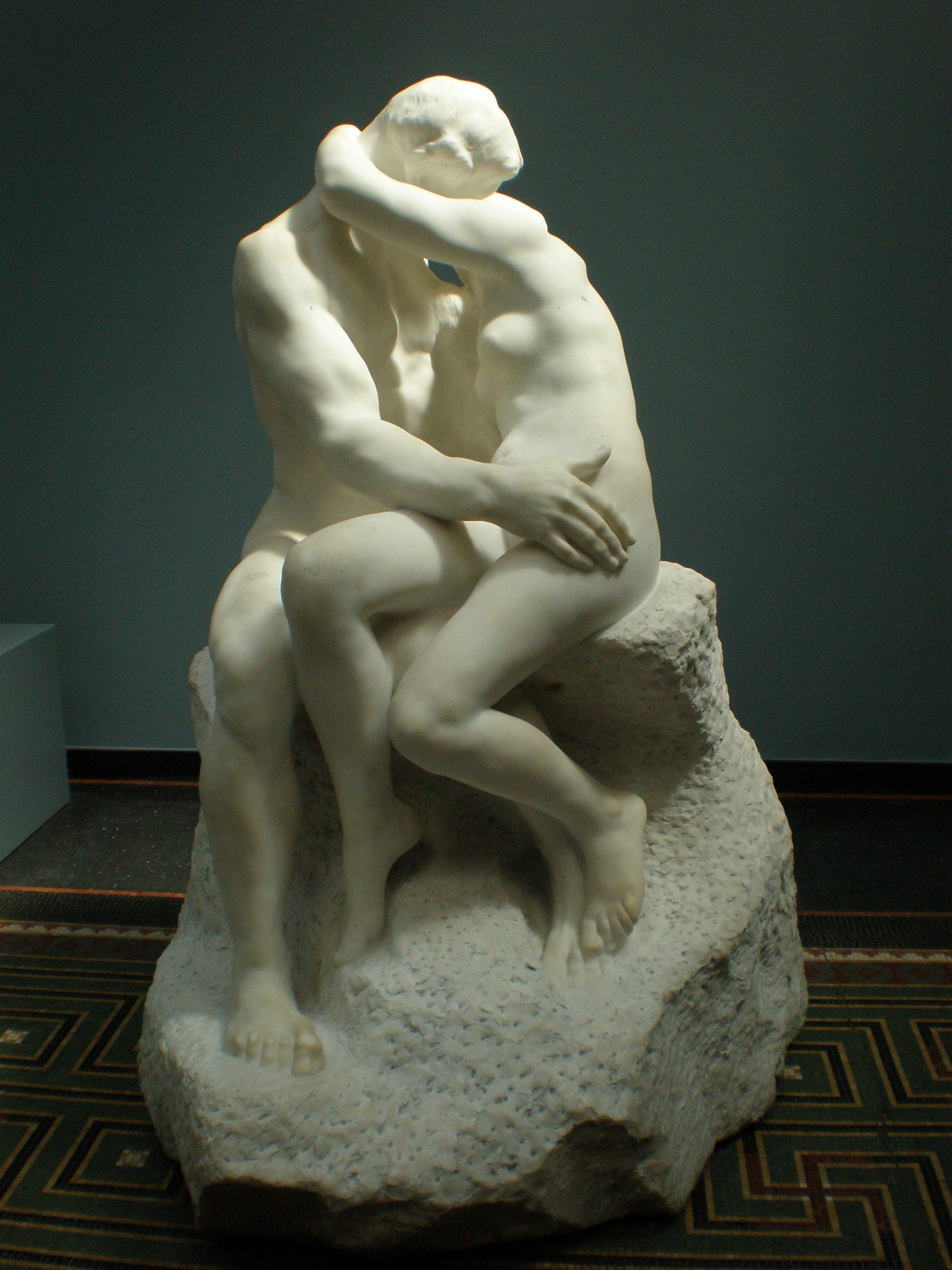
The Kiss in marble at the Ny Carlsberg Glyptotek in Copenhagen.

A third replica was commissioned in 1900 by Carl Jacobsen for his projected museum in Copenhagen, Denmark. The replica was made in 1903, and became part of the initial collection of the Ny Carlsberg Glyptotek, inaugurated in 1906.

=== Other versions ===
The three larger marble versions were exhibited together at the Musée d'Orsay in 1995. A fourth copy, about 182.9 centimetres (72.0 in) in height – compared to 181.5 centimetres (71.5 in) for the copy in Paris – was made after the death of Rodin by sculptor Henri-Léon Gréber for the Rodin Museum of Philadelphia. A plaster cast can be found in the Museo Nacional de Bellas Artes of Buenos Aires.

A large numbers of bronze casts have been done of The Kiss. The Musée Rodin reports that the Barbedienne foundry alone produced 319. According to French law issued in 1978, only the first twelve can be called original editions.

== Cornelia Parker ==
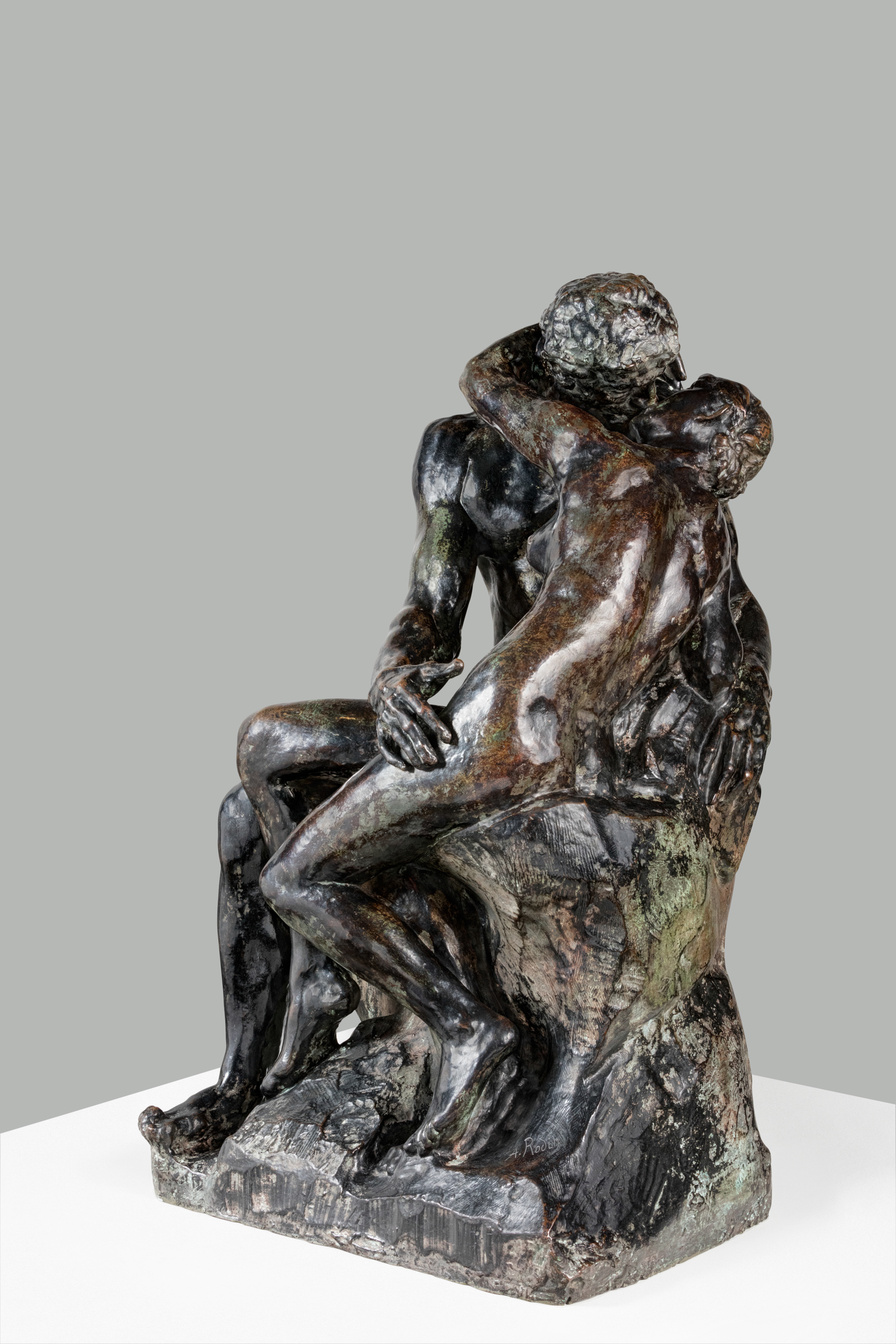
Bronze cast in Museo Soumaya, Mexico City

In Spring 2003, artist Cornelia Parker intervened in The Kiss (1886) with the permission of the Tate Britain gallery, where it was exhibited at the time, by wrapping the sculpture in a mile of string. This was a historical reference to Marcel Duchamp's use of the same length of string to create a web inside a gallery in 1942. Although the intervention had been endorsed by the gallery, many viewers of the sculpture felt it offensive to the original artwork, prompting a further, unauthorised, intervention, in which Parker's string was cut by Stuckist Piers Butler, while couples stood around engaging in live kissing.

== Popular culture ==
The Kiss is said to have been the influence for the song "Turn Of The Century", found on the 1977 release of "Going for the One" by the British band Yes.

The Kiss is figured into the plot of the All in the Family episode "Archie and The Kiss", where Archie Bunker tries to make his daughter, Gloria, give back a reproduction of the sculpture she had been given by the Bunkers' friend, Irene Lorenzo. Archie expresses his disgust over the morality of the sculpture and sexuality in artwork.

The statue is used for a Terry Gilliam animation in Monty Python's Flying Circus. The female extends her left leg straight out, and the male moves his right hand over it, covering holes with the fingers and playing her like an ocarina. The same statue was later shown briefly in the movie 12 Monkeys, also directed by Gilliam.

The Kiss was part of a side story in Cynthia D'Aprix Sweeney's debut novel The Nest (2016), where the sculpture is stolen from the rubble of ground zero after 9/11.

The local Lewes brewer, Harvey's Brewery, have brewed a beer named "Kiss", featuring a picture of The Kiss on its label, which is on sale in bottles and draught form around St Valentine's Day on 14 February.

In January 2004, the work was the subject of Episode 3 of the BBC Wales documentary series The Private Life of a Masterpiece, broadcast on BBC Two.
