= Bradfield (surname) =

Bradfield is a surname. Notable people with the surname include:

- Andrew Bradfield (1966–2001), New Zealand computer game programmer
- Arthur Bradfield (1892–1978), English cricketer
- Barry Bradfield (born 1981), Canadian artist
- Bill Bradfield (1910–2006), Australian aviation engineer and diplomat
- Cameron Bradfield (born 1987), American football player
- Carl Bradfield (born 1975), South African cricketer
- Damian Bradfield (born 1977), British businessman
- Frances Bradfield (1895–1967), British aeronautical engineer
- Geoffrey Bradfield (born 1948), South African cricketer
- George H. Bradfield (1880–1961), associate justice of the Colorado Supreme Court
- Harold Bradfield (1898–1960), Anglican bishop
- Henry Joseph Steele Bradfield (1805–1852), British colonial official and author
- James Dean Bradfield (born 1969), lead singer of the band Manic Street Preachers
- Jim Bradfield (1933–1989), Australian politician
- John Bradfield (disambiguation), the name of a number of people
  - John Bradfield (bishop) (died 1283), Bishop of Rochester
  - John Bradfield (engineer) (1867–1943), designer of the Sydney Harbour Bridge
  - Sir John Bradfield (biologist) (1925–2014), British founder of Cambridge Science Park
  - John Ross Bradfield (1899–1983), businessman
- Ken Bradfield (born 1929), American yachtsman
- Mary Bradfield, Colorado politician
- Polly Bradfield, American improvisational violinist
- Roger Bradfield (1924–2021), children's book illustrator
- Scott Bradfield (born 1955), American essayist
- W. Louis Bradfield (1866–1919), English actor and singer
- William (Bill) Bradfield (1927–2014), Australian amateur astronomer and rocket scientist
