= Comet Bradfield =

Comet Bradfield may refer to one of the 18 comets discovered by Australian astronomer, William A. Bradfield, below:

- C/1972 E1 (Bradfield)
- C/1974 C1 (Bradfield)
- C/1975 E1 (Bradfield)
- C/1975 V2 (Bradfield)
- C/1976 D1 (Bradfield)
- C/1976 E1 (Bradfield)
- C/1978 C1 (Bradfield)
- C/1978 T3 (Bradfield)
- C/1979 M1 (Bradfield)
- C/1979 Y1 (Bradfield)
- C/1980 Y1 (Bradfield)
- P/1984 A1 (Bradfield)
- C/1987 P1 (Bradfield)
- P/1989 A3 (Bradfield)
- C/1992 B1 (Bradfield)
- C/1992 J2 (Bradfield)
- C/1995 Q1 (Bradfield)
- C/2004 F4 (Bradfield)
