= Bernardino II da Polenta =

Past lord of Ravenna, Italy

Bernardino II da Polenta was lord of Ravenna, Italy from 1389 to 1400. He was the son of Guido III da Polenta, grandson of Bernardino I and a member of the da Polenta family. Bernardino's mother was Elisa d'Este, the daughter of Obizzo III d'Este of Ferrara, who gave him numerous children. In 1389, Bernardino and his brothers, Ostasio, Obizzo, Aldobrandino, Azzo and Pietro imprisoned their father and ruled Ravenna. The brothers died in quick succession; allegedly Bernardino was poisoned by his brother Obizzo.
