= Guido da Polenta =

Guido da Polenta may refer to:

- Guido I da Polenta (died 1297), lord of Ravenna
- Guido II da Polenta (died 1330), lord of Ravenna
- Guido III da Polenta (died 1389), lord of Ravenna
