= Lamberto =

Lamberto is an Italian male given name taken from the name Lambert. It may refer to:

- Lamberto Alvarez, Artist - Contemporary
- Lamberto Antonio, Philippine writer
- Lamberto Arbaud, Roman Catholic prelate, Bishop of Venosa
- Lamberto V. Avellana (1915–1991), prominent Filipino film and stage director
- Lamberto Bava (born 1944), Italian film director, specializing in horror and fantasy films
- Lamberto Bergamini (1885–1957), Italian tenor from Pisa
- Lamberto Cardia (1934–2026), Italian politician
- Lamberto Cesari (1910–1990), Italian mathematician naturalized in the United States
- Lamberto Ciani (born 1949), Italian architect and politician
- Lamberto da Cingoli, inquisitor in 14th century Italy
- Lamberto Dalla Costa (1920–1982), Italian bobsledder who competed in the late 1950s
- Lamberto Dini (help·info) (born 1931), Italian politician and economist
- Lamberto Gardelli (1915–1998), Italian conductor, especially of the works of Giuseppe Verdi
- Lamberto Giorgis (1932–2019), Italian football player and manager
- Lamberto Grimaldi (1420–1494), Lord of Monaco from 1458
- Lamberto I da Polenta (died 1316), Lord of Ravenna from 1297 until his death
- Lamberto II da Polenta (died 1347), shortly Lord of Ravenna and Cervia from 1346 until his death
- Lamberto Landi (1882–1950), Italian composer and conductor
- Lamberto Leonardi (1939–2021), Italian football player and coach
- Lamberto Leoni (born 1953), former racing driver from Italy
- Lamberto Loria (1855–1913), Italian ethnographer, naturalist and explorer
- Lamberto Maggiorani (1909–1983), Italian actor, portrayed Antonio Ricci in Ladri di Biciclette
- Lamberto Mari (born 1933), Italian diver
- Lamberto Picasso (1880–1962), Italian film actor
- Lamberto Pignotti (born 1926), Italian poet, writer and visual artist
- Lamberto Puggelli (1938–2013), Italian stage and opera director
- Antonio Lamberto Rusconi, J.U.D. (1743–1825), Italian cardinal who served as bishop of Imola
- Lamberto Sposini (born 1952), Italian journalist, news speaker and television presenter
- Lamberto Visconti di Eldizio (died 1225), the Judge of Gallura from 1206
- Lamberto Zannier (born 1954), Italian diplomat and United Nations Special Representative for Kosovo
- Lamberto Zauli (born 1971), Italian association football coach and former player

== See also ==
- Cardinal Lamberto, fictional character appearing in The Godfather Part III
- Maravillas Lamberto, 14-year-old girl from Larraga, Navarre, raped and killed by Falangists
- Mario Lamberto (born 1957), Italian conductor
