= 1347 =

1347 in various calendars
- Gregorian calendar: 1347; MCCCXLVII
- Ab urbe condita: 2100
- Armenian calendar: 796; ԹՎ ՉՂԶ
- Assyrian calendar: 6097
- Balinese saka calendar: 1268–1269
- Bengali calendar: 753–754
- Berber calendar: 2297
- English Regnal year: 20 Edw. 3 – 21 Edw. 3
- Buddhist calendar: 1891
- Burmese calendar: 709
- Byzantine calendar: 6855–6856
- Chinese calendar: 丙戌年 (Fire Dog); 4044 or 3837 — to — 丁亥年 (Fire Pig); 4045 or 3838
- Coptic calendar: 1063–1064
- Discordian calendar: 2513
- Ethiopian calendar: 1339–1340
- Hebrew calendar: 5107–5108
- Hindu calendars
- Vikram Samvat: 1403–1404
- Shaka Samvat: 1268–1269
- Kali Yuga: 4447–4448
- Holocene calendar: 11347
- Igbo calendar: 347–348
- Iranian calendar: 725–726
- Islamic calendar: 747–748
- Japanese calendar: Jōwa 3 (貞和３年)
- Javanese calendar: 1259–1260
- Julian calendar: 1347; MCCCXLVII
- Korean calendar: 3680
- Minguo calendar: 565 before ROC 民前565年
- Nanakshahi calendar: −121
- Thai solar calendar: 1889–1890
- Tibetan calendar: མེ་ཕོ་ཁྱི་ལོ་ (male Fire-Dog); 1473 or 1092 or 320 — to — མེ་མོ་ཕག་ལོ་ (female Fire-Boar); 1474 or 1093 or 321

Year 1347 (MCCCXLVII) was a common year starting on Monday of the Julian calendar, and a common year starting on Sunday of the Proleptic Gregorian calendar.

== Events ==
=== January–December ===
- January 26 – Charles University in Prague is founded by a bull issued by Pope Clement VI, at the request of Charles I, King of Bohemia.
- February 2 – The Byzantine civil war of 1341–1347 between John VI Kantakouzenos and the regency for John V Palaiologos ends with Kantakouzenos entering Constantinople.
- February 26 – The Maona of Chios and Phocaea is formed to manage the overseas possessions of the Republic of Genoa.
- April – The Knights Hospitaller defeat a Turkish fleet, and sink 100 ships off Imbros.
- May
  - The agreement reorganizing the Byzantine Empire's affairs is finalized, as Anna of Savoy's son John V Palaiologos marries Kantakouzenos' 15-year-old daughter Helena.
  - Genoese ships fleeing the 1331 Black Death plague in Theodosia stop in Constantinople, contaminating the city.
- May 20 – Cola di Rienzo, a Roman commoner, declares himself Emperor of Rome, in response to years of baronial power struggles.
- June 20 – Battle of La Roche-Derrien was fought in the Breton War of Succession. The Franco-Breton forces of Charles of Blois lost to the forces of Thomas Dagworth in the town of La Roche-Derrien.
- August 2 – The Islamic Bahmani Kingdom is established on the Indian subcontinent.
- September – Hundred Years' War: The English win the city of Calais.
- September 1 – The Black Death reaches the French port city of Marseille.
- October – Ships arrive in the Sicilian city of Messina, carrying people afflicted by the Black Death onboard.
- November
  - Pope Clement VI unites several of Rome's upper-class nobility, who drive Cola di Rienzo out of the city.
  - King Phillip of France meets with the Estates General to ask for funds to further the war effort against the English.
- November 1 – The Black Death spreads to Aix-en-Provence in France.
- December – Plague hits the island of Mallorca.
- December 24 – Pembroke College in the University of Cambridge, England, is founded by Marie de St Pol, Countess of Pembroke, as the Hall of Valence Marie.
- December 25 – The first cases of the plague are recorded in the city of Split, in Croatia.
- December 27 – To fund military operations in Corsica, the Republic of Genoa has to borrow at 20%, from an association of creditors known as the Compera nuova acquisitionis Corsicæ.

== Asia ==
=== Western Asia ===
The Mamluk Empire is hit by the plague in the autumn. Baghdad is hit in the same year.

=== South Asia ===
After years of resistance against the Delhi Sultan Muhammad bin Tughluq, the Bahmani Kingdom, a Muslim Sultanate in the Deccan, was established on August 3, when King Ala-ud-din Hasan Bahman Shah was crowned in a mosque in Daulatabad. Later in the year, the Kingdom's capital was moved from Daulatabad to the more central Gulbarga. Southeast Asia suffered a drought which dried up an important river which ran through the capital city of the Kingdom of Ayodhya, forcing the King to move the capital to a new location on the Lop Buri River.

== Europe ==
=== Eastern and Scandinavian ===
Citizens of Tournai bury plague victims. Miniature from "The Chronicles of Gilles Li Muisis" (1272-1352). Bibliothèque royale de Belgique, MS 13076-77, f. 24v.

On February 2 the Byzantine Empire's civil war between John VI Kantakouzenos and the regency ended with John VI entering Constantinople. On February 8, an agreement was concluded with the empress Anna of Savoy, whereby he and John V Palaiologos would rule jointly. The agreement was finalized in May when John V married Kantakouzenos' 15-year-old daughter. The war had come at a high cost economically and territorially, and much of the Empire was in need of rebuilding. To make matters worse, in May Genoese ships fleeing the Black Death in Kaffa stopped in Constantinople. The plague soon spread from their ships to the city. By autumn, the epidemic had spread throughout the Balkans, possibly through contact with Venetian ports along the Adriatic Sea. Specific cases were recorded in the northern Balkans on December 25, in the city of Split.

After being proclaimed Tsar of Serbia in the previous year by the newly promoted Serbian Patriarch Joanikije II, Stefan Dušan continued his southern expansion by conquering Epirus, Aetolia and Acarnania, appointing his half-brother, despot Simeon Uroš as governor of those provinces.

=== Central ===
On May 20 Cola di Rienzo, a Roman commoner, declared himself Emperor of Rome in front of a huge crowd in response to what had been several years of power struggles among the upper-class barony. Pope Clement VI, along with several of Rome's upper-class nobility, united to drive him out of the city in November. In October, Genoese ships arrived in southern Italy with the Black Plague, beginning the spread of the disease in the region. Jews were first accused of ritual murders in Poland in 1347. Casimir III of Poland issues Poland's first codified collection of laws after the diet of Wiślica. Separate laws are codified for greater and lesser Poland.

=== Western Europe ===
In the continuing Hundred Years' War, the English won the city of Calais in a treaty signed in September. In a meeting with the Estates General in November, the French King Phillip was told that in the recent war efforts they had "lost all and gained nothing." Phillip, however, was granted a portion of the money he requested and was able to continue his war effort. The English King Edward offered Calais a package of economic boosts which would make Calais the key city connecting England with France economically. Edward returned to England at that height of his popularity and power and for six months celebrated his successes with others in the English nobility. Although the Kingdom's funds were largely pushed towards the war, building projects among the more wealthy continued, with, for example, the completion of Pembroke College in this year.

The French city of Marseille recognized the plague on September 1 and by November 1 it had spread to Aix-en-Provence. The earliest recorded invasion of the plague into Spanish territory was in Mallorca in December 1347, probably through commercial ships. Three years of plague began in England.

== Births ==
- February 6 – Dorothea of Montau, German hermitess and visionary (d. 1394)
- February 27 – Alberto d'Este, Lord of Ferrara and Modena (d. 1393)
- March 25 – Catherine of Siena, Italian saint (d. 1380)
- March 31 – Frederick III, Duke of Austria, second son of Duke Albert II of Austria (d. 1362)
- July 28 – Margherita of Durazzo, Queen consort of Charles III of Naples (d. 1412)
- August 29 – John Hastings, 2nd Earl of Pembroke, English nobleman and soldier (d. 1375)
- date unknown
  - Eleanor of Arborea, ruler of Sardinia (d. 1404)
  - Elizabeth of Pomerania, fourth and final wife of Charles IV, Holy Roman Emperor (d. 1393)
  - Emperor Go-Kameyama, 99th Emperor of Japan (d. 1424)
  - Richardis of Schwerin, queen consort of Sweden (d. 1377)

== Deaths ==
- February 2 – Thomas Bek, Bishop of Lincoln (b. 1282)
- April 9 – William of Ockham, English philosopher and Franciscan monk (b. c. 1285)
- May 30 – John Darcy, 1st Baron Darcy de Knayth, English peer (b. 1290)
- June – John de Warenne, 7th Earl of Surrey, English nobleman (b. 1286)
- June 11 – Bartholomew of San Concordio, Italian Dominican canonist and man of letters (b. 1260)
- October 11 – Louis IV, Holy Roman Emperor (b. 1282)
- November – Richard de Pilmuir, bishop of Dunkeld
- November 12 – John of Viktring, Austrian chronicler and political advisor in Carinthia (b. 1270–1280)
- November 15 – James I of Urgell, Prince of Aragon (b. 1321)
- date unknown
  - Shah Jalal, Sufi saint of Bengal (b. 1271)
  - Blanca de La Cerda y Lara, Spanish noblewoman (b. 1317)
  - John de Egglescliffe, English bishop
  - Adam Murimuth, English ecclesiastic and chronicler (b. 1274)
  - Peter III of Arborea, Judge of Arborea
  - Lamberto II and Pandolfo da Polenta, brothers and lords of Ravenna and Cervia
  - Kokan Shiren, Japanese Rinzai Zen patriarch and celebrated Chinese poet (b. 1278)
  - Sang Nila Utama, Founder and First King of Singapura

== See also ==
- 1331
