= Bannino da Polenta =

Past lord of Cervia, Italy

Bannino da Polenta (died 1326) was lord of Cervia from 1313 until his death. He was the son of Guido I da Polenta.

In 1313 he succeeded his brother Bernardino as the lord of Cervia. Bernardino's son Ostasio, who had already seized the power in Ravenna in 1322, killed Bannino and his son Guido in 1326, gaining also the lordship of Cervia.

== See also ==
- Da Polenta family

Preceded by Bernardino da Polenta	Lord of Cervia; 1313–1326	Succeeded by Ostasio I da Polenta
