= Bradfield =

Bradfield may refer to:

== Places ==
=== Australia ===
- Bradfield, New South Wales, a suburb in south-west Sydney, created in 2023
- Bradfield, New South Wales (1924–1977), a former Sydney suburb, that existed until 1977.
- Division of Bradfield, an electoral division in New South Wales

=== United Kingdom ===
- Bradfield, Berkshire, a village and civil parish
- Bradfield, Essex, a village and civil parish
- Bradfield, Norfolk, a village
- Bradfield, South Yorkshire, a civil parish in the City of Sheffield
- Bradfield, Suffolk
  - Bradfield Combust, a village
  - Bradfield St Clare, a village and civil parish
  - Bradfield St George, a village and civil parish

=== Zimbabwe ===
- Bradfield, Zimbabwe, a neighborhood in the city of Bulawayo

== Other uses ==
- Bradfield (surname)
- HMS Bradfield, Royal Navy minesweeper during World War I
- 3430 Bradfield, a main-belt asteroid
- Comet Bradfield (disambiguation)
