= 1274 =

1274 in various calendars
- Gregorian calendar: 1274; MCCLXXIV
- Ab urbe condita: 2027
- Armenian calendar: 723; ԹՎ ՉԻԳ
- Assyrian calendar: 6024
- Balinese saka calendar: 1195–1196
- Bengali calendar: 680–681
- Berber calendar: 2224
- English Regnal year: 2 Edw. 1 – 3 Edw. 1
- Buddhist calendar: 1818
- Burmese calendar: 636
- Byzantine calendar: 6782–6783
- Chinese calendar: 癸酉年 (Water Rooster); 3971 or 3764 — to — 甲戌年 (Wood Dog); 3972 or 3765
- Coptic calendar: 990–991
- Discordian calendar: 2440
- Ethiopian calendar: 1266–1267
- Hebrew calendar: 5034–5035
- Hindu calendars
- Vikram Samvat: 1330–1331
- Shaka Samvat: 1195–1196
- Kali Yuga: 4374–4375
- Holocene calendar: 11274
- Igbo calendar: 274–275
- Iranian calendar: 652–653
- Islamic calendar: 672–673
- Japanese calendar: Bun'ei 11 (文永１１年)
- Javanese calendar: 1184–1185
- Julian calendar: 1274; MCCLXXIV
- Korean calendar: 3607
- Minguo calendar: 638 before ROC 民前638年
- Nanakshahi calendar: −194
- Thai solar calendar: 1816–1817
- Tibetan calendar: ཆུ་མོ་བྱ་ལོ་ (female Water-Bird); 1400 or 1019 or 247 — to — ཤིང་ཕོ་ཁྱི་ལོ་ (male Wood-Dog); 1401 or 1020 or 248

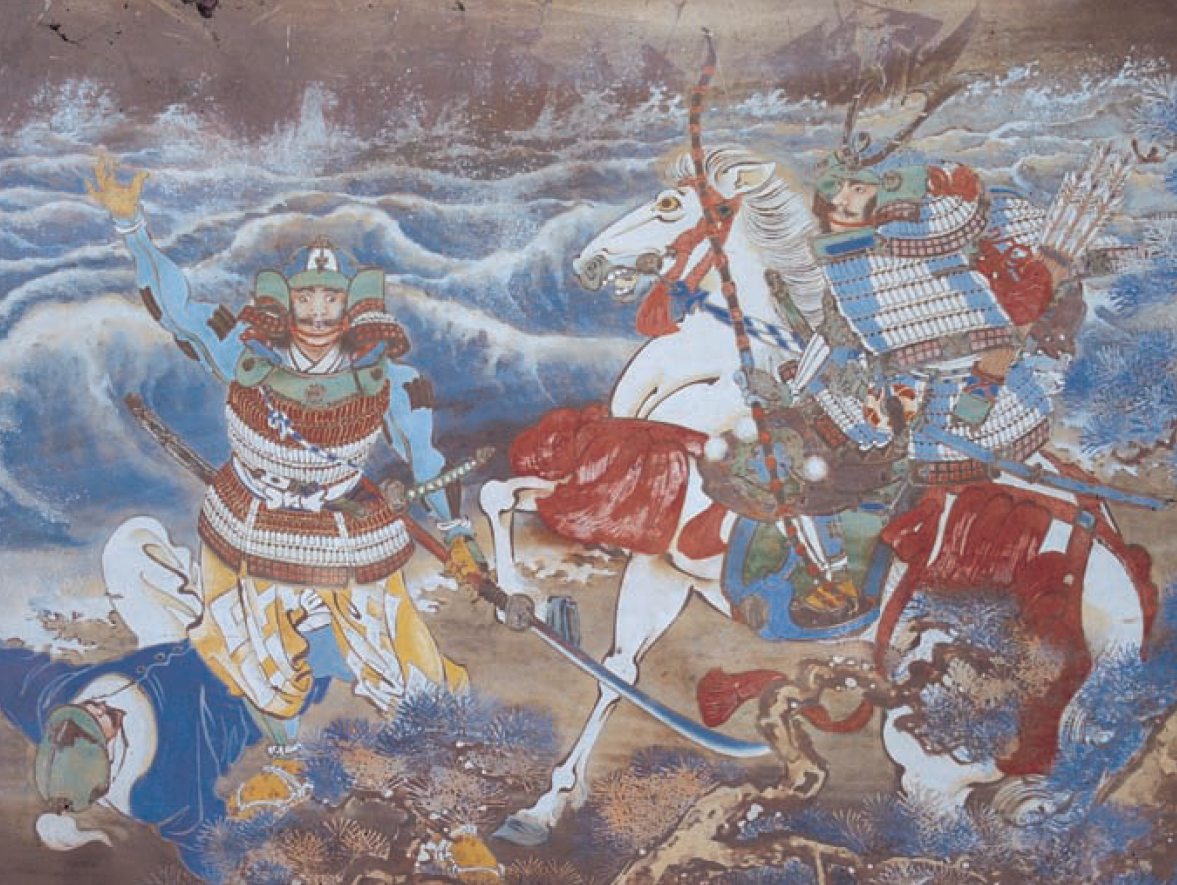
The first Mongol invasion of Japan is repelled. Two samurai at Hakata Bay.

Year 1274 (MCCLXXIV) was a common year starting on Monday of the Julian calendar.

== Events ==
=== By place ===
==== Europe ====
- May 7 – Second Council of Lyon: Pope Gregory X convenes a council at Lyon, after Byzantine Emperor Michael VIII Palaiologos gives assurances that the Orthodox Church is prepared to reunite with Rome. The council agrees to a settlement between the Catholic Church and the Orthodox Church over several key issues – Orthodox acceptance of papal primacy and the acceptance of the Nicene Creed with the Filioque clause. Gregory approves a tithe to support efforts to liberate the Holy Land from Muslims, and reaches apparent resolution of the schism, which ultimately proves unsuccessful. All but four mendicant orders of friars are suppressed. Catholic teaching on Purgatory is defined for the first time.
- November – The Imperial Diet at Nuremberg orders that all crown estates seized since the death of Emperor Frederick II be restored to King Rudolf I. Almost all European rulers agree, with the exception of Ottokar II, king of Bohemia, who has benefited greatly by conquering or otherwise coming into possession of many of those lands.

==== England ====
- August 2 – Edward I of England finally returns from the Holy Land to be crowned king of England on August 19 at Westminster Abbey two years after his father King Henry III's death.
- September 21 – Walter de Merton, English chancellor and regent, retires from royal service, in favour of Robert Burnell, who becomes a strong ally of the Edwardian regime.
- The first main survey of the Hundred Rolls, an English census seen as a follow-up to the Domesday Book (completed in 1086), is begun; it lasts until 1275.

==== Africa ====
- Abu Yusuf Yaqub ibn Abd al-Haqq, Marinid ruler, enters peacefully into Ceuta, putting an end to some 40 years of the city's independence.

==== Asia ====
- November 4–19 – Battle of Bun'ei: Forces of the Mongol-led Yuan dynasty of China invade Japan. After conquering the Japanese settlements on Tsushima and Iki islands, Kublai Khan's fleet moves on to Japan and lands at Hakata Bay. Their landing is not unopposed: an old sea wall runs along much of the bay, and behind it are stationed the warriors of Hōjō Tokimune. The Japanese open combat with whistling arrows (kabura-ya), designed to unnerve and intimidate their foes. The Mongols use bombs against the Japanese forces and manage to break through at a few places, burning down the nearby town of Hakata (modern-day Fukuoka). The invaders are eventually repelled, and after inflicting heavy losses on the Japanese, a withdrawal is ordered. Credited to a great typhoon – called a kamikaze, or divine wind – the Mongol fleet is dashed on the rocks and destroyed. Some sources suggest that 200 warships are lost. Of the 30,000 strong invasion force, some 13,000 does not return.
- Nichiren, Japanese priest and philosopher, enters exile on Mount Minobu. He leads a widespread movement of followers in Kantō and Sado mainly through his prolific letter-writing.

=== By topic ===
==== Literature ====
- Bonvesin da la Riva, Italian poet, writes the didactic-allegoric poem Liber di Tre Scricciur ("Book of the Three Scriptures"). The text is in the Western Lombard language (similar to other Gallo-Italic languages). The poem is one of the first great literary works in Italy. It tells about Hell, the Passion of Jesus and Paradise; the plot later prefigures Dante Alighieri in his Divine Comedy (Divina Commedia).
- May 1 – In Florence, the 9-year-old Dante first sees the 8-year-old Beatrice, his lifelong muse. She appears later as one of his guides in the Divine Comedy, Paradiso and Purgatorio.

==== Religion ====
- Pope Gregory X decrees that conclaves (gatherings of the College of Cardinals where the elections of a bishop of Rome are convened) should be used for papal elections, reforming the electoral process which had taken over 3 years to elect him.
- Gregory X obtains the region of Romagna from Rudolf I, in exchange for acknowledging him as Holy Roman Emperor. With this important acquisition, the Papal States become the second-largest power block in Italy after the Kingdom of Sicily.

== Births ==
- February 9 – Louis of Toulouse, French archbishop (d. 1297)
- April 1 – Robert Clifford, English nobleman and knight (d. 1314)
- July 11 – Robert the Bruce, king of Scotland (d. 1329)
- July 25 – John Beauchamp, English nobleman (d. 1336)
- October 4 – Rudolf I, German nobleman (d. 1319)
- October 5 – Al-Dhahabi, Syrian scholar and encyclopedist (d. 1348)
- November 24 – Catherine I, Latin empress (d. 1307)
- Eric VI, king of Denmark (House of Estridsen) (d. 1319)
- Ibn al-Jayyab, Andalusian scholar and poet (d. 1349)
- Marino Faliero (or Falier), doge of Venice (d. 1355)
- Rizzardo IV da Camino, Italian nobleman and military leader (d. 1312)
- Sancho I ("the Peaceful"), king of Majorca (d. 1324)
- Seisetsu Shōchō, Chinese Buddhist missionary (d. 1339)
- Approximate date
  - Adam Murimuth, English priest and chronicler (d. 1347)
  - Anastasia de Montfort, Italian noblewoman (d. 1345)
  - Awhadi Maraghai, Persian poet and mystic (d. 1338)
  - Nasiruddin Chiragh Dehlavi, Indian Sufi poet (d. 1337)

== Deaths ==
- February 18 – Jakob Erlandsen, Danish cleric and archbishop
- February 19 – Lal Shahbaz Qalandar, Afghan Sufi poet (b. 1177)
- February 21 – Ibn Malik, Moorish grammarian and writer (b. 1205)
- March 7 – Thomas Aquinas, Italian friar and theologian (b. 1225)
- April 26 – Heinrich von Wartenberg, Swiss nobleman and abbot
- June 3 – Lawrence of St. Martin, English archdeacon and bishop
- June 26 – Nasir al-Din al-Tusi, Persian scientist and writer (b. 1201)
- July 15 – Bonaventure, Italian theologian and philosopher (b. 1221)
- July 22 – Henry I (or Henry III), king of Navarre (House of Blois)
- July 23 – Wonjong of Goryeo, Korean prince and ruler (b. 1219)
- August 4 – Robert Stitchill (or Stichel), English prior and bishop
- August 12 – Duzong (or Zhao Qi), Chinese emperor (b. 1240)
- August 15 – Robert de Sorbon, French chaplain and theologian
- September 2 – Munetaka, Japanese prince and shogun (b. 1242)
- September 26–29 – Henry I Kőszegi ("the Great"), Hungarian nobleman (b. 1210)
- October 14 – Henry, English prince and son of Edward I (b. 1268)
- November 4 – Sō Sukekuni, Japanese governor (jitodai) (b. 1207)
- November 8 – Fujiwara no Akiuji, Japanese nobleman (b. 1207)
- November 10 – Aveline de Forz, English noblewoman (b. 1259)
- November 28 – Philip of Castile, son of Ferdinand III (b. 1231)
- Beatrice of Montferrat, Italian noblewoman and regent (b. 1210)
- Gilbert of Preston, English nobleman and chief justice (b. 1209)
- Liu Bingzhong, Chinese court advisor and architect (b. 1216)
- Sadr al-Din al-Qunawi, Seljuk philosopher and writer (b. 1207)
- Approximate date
  - Arnold Fitz Thedmar, English merchant and chronicler (b. 1201)
  - William Longleg, Lord of Douglas, Scottish nobleman (b. 1220)

== In fiction ==
- The video-game Ghost of Tsushima is set in the year 1274.
