= 3430 =

3430 may refer to:

- A.D. 3430, a year in the 4th millennium CE
- 3430 BC, a year in the 4th millennium BCE
- 3430, a number in the 3000 (number) range

== Other uses ==
- 3430 Bradfield, an asteroid in the Asteroid Belt, the 3430th asteroid registered
- Texas Farm to Market Road 3430, a state highway
