= Battle of Castagnaro =

Battle fought in 1387 between Verona and Padua

- An artist's conception of an aerial perspective of the battle, showing the Paduan army, commanded by Sir John Hawkwood, outflanking and defeating the Veronese.
Date	11 March 1387
Location	Castagnaro, Verona, Veneto, Italy
Result	Paduan victory

Belligerents
Army of Verona	Army of Padua; White Company

Commanders and leaders
Giovanni Ordelaffi (POW); Ostasio da Polenta (POW); Giovanni dell'Ischia	John Hawkwood; Francesco Novello da Carrara

Strength
≈ 11,000–16,000 men with ( 12,000–16,000 reserves, mostly peasants)	Total: ≈ 7,000–9,200 men; Soldiers brought by John Hawkwood; ≈ 600 cavalry; ≈ 500 archers; The army of Padua and their other condottieri; ≈8,000 men

Casualties and losses
(4,000–7,000 total casualties): 716 killed; 846 wounded; 4,000+ men captured along with the entirety of the Veronese artillery and both Ordelaffi and da Polenta	Light

The Battle of Castagnaro was fought on 11 March 1387 at Castagnaro (today's Veneto, northern Italy) between Verona and Padua. It is one of the most famous battles of the Italian condottieri age.

The army of Verona was led by Giovanni Ordelaffi and Ostasio II da Polenta, while the victorious Paduans were commanded by John Hawkwood (Giovanni Acuto) and Francesco Novello da Carrara, the son of Francesco I, lord of Padua. John Hawkwood brought 1,100 of his own condottiere (600 cavalry and 500 archers, or vice versa depending on the source) to supplement the Paduan forces of 8,000 men (Giuseppe Marcotti places the number of dismounted condottiere at 6,000 men, along with a reserve of 1,600 horse. He also goes on to say that there were 1,000 native footmen of Padua, and 600 crossbowmen guarding a river bank.)

Castagnaro is hailed as Sir John Hawkwood's greatest victory. Following a Fabian-like strategy, Hawkwood goaded the Veronese into attacking him on a field of his own choosing, by laying waste to the Veronese lands nearby.

Drawing his forces up on the far side of a canal, and anchoring his right flank on a patch of woods, Hawkwood waited until the Veronese had committed to attacking across a ford of fascines piled up in the canal. Once so occupied, Hawkwood sprang his trap.

Hawkwood had left a copy of his standard behind his forces, then had led his cavalry into the woods to his right. At a given signal — supposedly, a flaming arrow — the copy of his standard dropped, and Hawkwood's cavalry burst from the woods on the Veronese left, with his real standard in front. At the point of impact, Hawkwood is said to have cast his commander's baton into the Veronese ranks and ordered his men to retrieve it for him.

Per Trease, it is said that Hawkwood's battle cry that day was a grim play on the Paduan war-cry of Carro! ("Cart!", from the coat of arms of the House of Da Carrara) — in Hawkwood's rendition, it became Carne! ("Flesh!").

The Veronese tried to intervene with their reserve of 2,500 cavalry commanded by Captain General Giovanni degli Ordelaffi and Ostasio da Polenta. However, the road was blocked by Hawkwood's forces, and Giovanni degli Ordelaffi and Ostasio da Polenta were captured; 1,900 of the cavalry fled, but were pursued and many were captured. The corps of infantry and Veronese peasants commanded by Giovanni da Isola remained intact on the battlefield, but was destroyed after it refused to surrender.
