= Guido I =

Guido I may refer to:

- Guido I da Polenta (d. 1297)
- Guido I da Montefeltro (1223–1298)
