= James Bradfield =

James Bradfield may refer to:

- Jim Bradfield (1933–1989), Australian politician
- James Dean Bradfield (born 1969), Welsh musician, lead guitarist of the Manic Street Preachers
- James Bradfield Primary School, Norfolk, England
- James Bradfield Moody (born 1976), Australian business executive

== See also ==
- Bradfield (disambiguation)
