= John Bradfield =

John Bradfield may refer to:

- John Bradfield (engineer) (1867–1943), Australian engineer, designer of the Sydney Harbour Bridge
- John Ross Bradfield (1899–1983), Canadian businessman
- John Bradfield (bishop) (died 1283), Bishop of Rochester
- John Bradfield (biologist) (1925–2014), British biologist, founder of Cambridge Science Park
