= Lambert II =

Lambert II may refer to:

- Lambert II of Nantes (d. 852)
- Lambert II of Spoleto (c. 880 – 898)
- Lambert II of Louvain (d. 1054)
- Lambert II, Count of Lens (d. 1054)
- Lamberto II da Polenta (d. 1347)
