= Ostasio I da Polenta =

Lord of Ravenna from 1322 until 1346

Ostasio I da Polenta (died 14 November 1346) was lord of Ravenna from 1322 until his death.

He was the son of Bernardino da Polenta, lord of Cervia. On 20 September 1322 he profited from the absence of Guido Novello da Polenta to seize power in Ravenna, killing the archbishop Rinaldo da Polenta. Four years later Ostasio had his uncle Bannino da Polenta, who held power in Cervia, killed, assuming thenceforth the lordship of that city also.

Ostasio was also a patron of the arts and housed Giovanni Boccaccio in his court (1345–1346).

Pope Benedict XII legitimised his power with the title Papal vicar, but soon afterwards Ostasio died, allegedly assassinated by his son Bernardino.

== See also ==
- Da Polenta

Preceded by Guido II	Lord of Ravenna; 1322–1346	Succeeded by Bernardino I Lamberto II; Pandolfo
Preceded by Bannino	Lord of Cervia; 1326–1346	Succeeded by Bernardino I Lamberto II; Pandolfo
