= William of Perth =

Scottish martyred humanitarian

Saint William of Perth
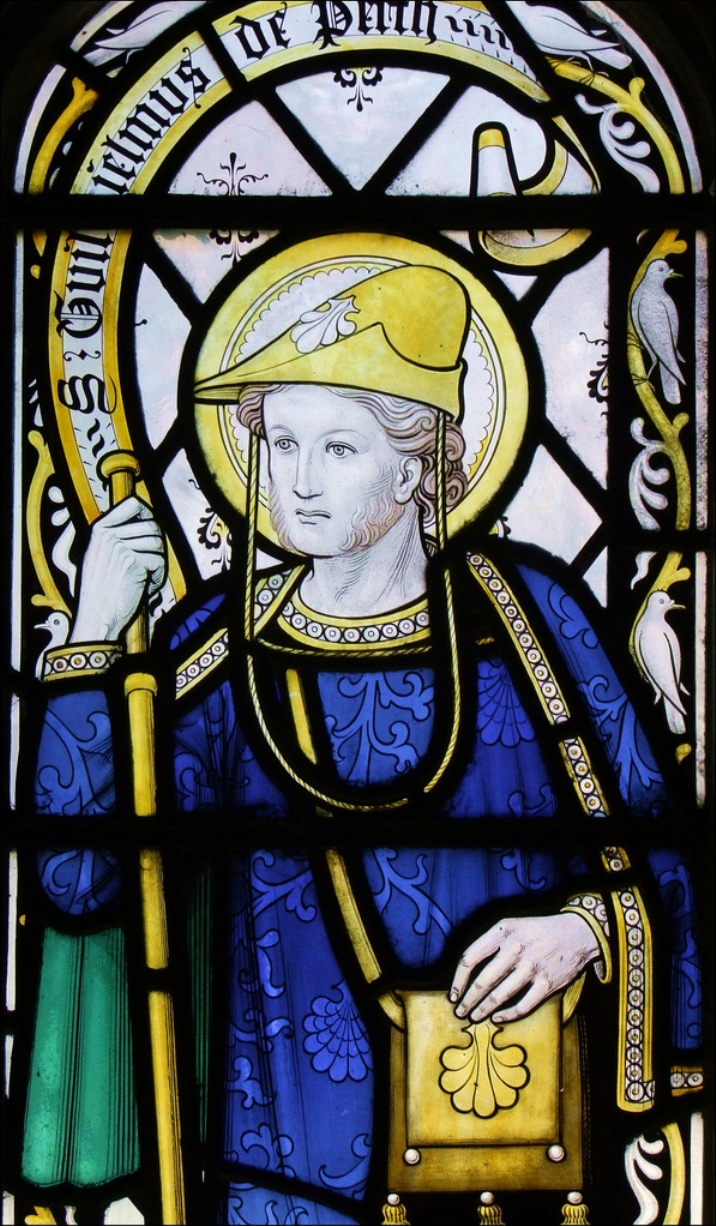
- Stained glass window in Rochester Cathedral, late 19th century

Martyr
- Born: 12th century Perth, Scotland
- Died: c. 1201; Rochester, England
- Venerated in: Catholic Church, Scottish Episcopal Church
- Canonized: 1256 by Pope Alexander IV
- Feast: May 23
- Attributes: as a pilgrim wearing a scallop shell
- Patronage: Adopted children

Saint William of Perth (died c. 1201), also known as Saint William of Rochester or Saint Liam, was a Scottish saint who was martyred in England. He is the patron saint of adopted children. Following his death, he gained local acclaim and was canonised by Pope Alexander IV in 1256.

William was a devout individual and a baker who gave every tenth loaf of bread to the poor. He adopted an abandoned child and taught him his trade. Years later they set off on a pilgrimage. William was murdered, and his adopted son suspected of the crime intending to rob him. The Bishop of Rochester obtained William's canonization and created a shrine in Rochester Cathedral which drew many pilgrims.

== Life ==
Little is known about the life of William, and practically all information regarding him comes from Capgrave's Nova Legenda Angliae. He was born in Perth, at that time one of the principal towns of Scotland. In youth, he had been somewhat wild, but on reaching manhood he devoted himself wholly to the service of God. A baker by trade, he was accustomed to setting aside every tenth loaf for the poor.

He went to Mass daily, and one morning, before it was light, found on the threshold of the church an abandoned child, whom he adopted and to whom he taught his trade. Later he took a vow to visit the Holy Places, and, having received the consecrated wallet and staff as a Palmer, set out with his adopted son, whose name is given as "Cocker may Doura", which is said to be Scots for "David the Foundling". They stayed three days at Rochester, Kent, and proceeded to Canterbury the next day (and perhaps thence to Jerusalem). However, according to a popular account, David willfully misled his benefactor with a short-cut and, with robbery in view, felled him with a blow on the head and cut his throat.

The body was discovered by a Lunatic mad woman, who plaited a garland of honeysuckle and placed it first on the head of the corpse and then her own, whereupon the madness left her. On learning her tale the monks of Rochester carried the body to the cathedral and there buried it.

== Veneration ==
In 1256 Lawrence of St Martin, Bishop of Rochester, obtained the canonisation of William from Pope Alexander IV. His shrine, which was situated first in the crypt, then in the northeast transept, was begun at once and attracted crowds of pilgrims. At the same time a small chapel was built at the place of the murder, which was thereafter called Palmersdene.

The shrine of St William of Perth became a place of pilgrimage bringing medieval pilgrims to the cathedral. Their footsteps wore down the original stone Pilgrim Steps, and nowadays they are covered with wooden treads. Margaret Darcy, of Essex, in her will, expressed the wish that her servant, Margaret Staunford, should go on a pilgrimage to "Seint Willyam of Rowchester".

On 18 and 19 February 1300, King Edward I gave two donations of seven shillings to the shrine. Offerings at the shrine were also recorded from Queen Philippa (1352). On 29 November 1399, Pope Boniface IX granted an indulgence to those who visited and gave alms to the shrine on certain specified days. The local people continued to make bequests through the 15th and 16th centuries.

The coat of arms of the Bishop of Rochester consists of Saint Andrew's cross with a scallop shell in its centre, which is said to represent William; Andrew being the patron saint of Scotland and scallops being the symbol of pilgrimage. St William is represented in a wall-painting, which was discovered in 1883 in Frindsbury church, near Rochester, which is supposed to have been painted about 1256–1266, in which case it is also the only known mural of him.

His official feast day is 23 May, though there is another feast day celebrated on 22 April. He is the patron saint of adopted children.

In the film St. Vincent, St William is featured in a school report by one of the main characters, Oliver, who finds him interesting primarily because he himself is adopted. The story of Saint William of Perth is also recounted by the character DS James Hathaway in series four, episode four, of Lewis.

St William of Perth Primary School, Rochester, is named after him.

== See also ==
- Saint William of Perth, patron saint of adopted children
