= Richard Wendene =

13th-century Bishop of Rochester

The Right Reverend Richard Wendene
- Bishop of Rochester
- Elected: 26 March 1235
- Term ended: 12 October 1250
- Predecessor: Henry Sandford
- Successor: Lawrence of St Martin
- Other post: Rector of Bromley

Orders
- Consecration: 21 November 1238

Personal details
- Born: c. 1219 Wenden Lofts or Wendens Ambo, Essex
- Died: 12 October 1250 Freckenham, Suffolk
- Denomination: Roman Catholic

Richard Wendene (c. 1219–1250) was a medieval Bishop of Rochester.

== Identity ==
Richard's surname was variously spelled, and he has been confused with Richard of Wendover, a physician and medical writer. "Wendene" could refer to Wenden Lofts in Essex (or even Wendens Ambo nearby). That Richard served Benedict of Sawston could strengthen this connexion, as Sawston is only ten miles from either village.

== Life ==
Richard was entitled magister and therefore must have attended university - and this would suggest his being from a well-heeled family. He was a clerk to Benedict of Sawston, bishop of Rochester, by 1215, and became the official to Benedict's successor Henry Sandford. He was also rector of Bromley in Kent.

At Sandford's death, in spring 1235, the monks of Rochester elected Wendene bishop. However, Edmund of Abingdon challenged the election, as he claimed the archbishop of Canterbury's jurisdiction over the Diocese of Rochester. It took a couple of years for the pope to find in the monks' favour, and Richard was consecrated on 21 November 1238 in Rochester Cathedral.

Richard died on 12 October 1250 at the episcopal manor of Freckenham, Suffolk. He was buried in Westminster Abbey.

== Citations ==
Catholic Church titles
Preceded by Henry Sandford	Bishop of Rochester; 1235–1250	Succeeded by Lawrence of St Martin
