= Pegasid =

Pegasid may represent:

- Pegasids - a meteor shower in July seemingly coming out of the constellation Pegasus
- Hot Jupiters - a class of exoplanets like the one around Pegasi 51 (51 Pegasi b)
- Pegasidae - a scientific family of fishes
- Pegasides - nymphs from Greek mythology
- Pegasi - mythical winged horses primarily from Greek mythology
- "Of Pegasus" - something originating from the mythical winged horse
- Pegasid Muses - English translation of the origin of Muses
