= C/1974 C1 (Bradfield) =

Non-periodic comet

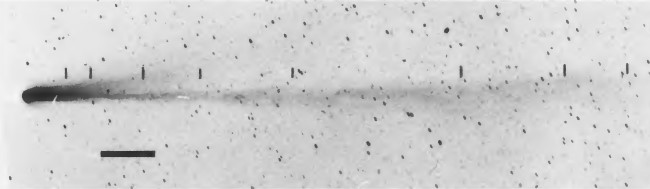
- Comet C/1974 C1 (Bradfield) photographed by NASA's Joint Observatory for Cometary Research (JOCR) program on 23 March 1974.

Discovery
- Discovered by: William A. Bradfield
- Discovery site: Dernancourt, Australia
- Discovery date: 12 February 1974

Designations
- Alternative designations: 1974 III, 1974b

Orbital characteristics
- Epoch: 20 April 1974 (JD 2442157.5)
- Observation arc: 277 days
- Number of observations: 173
- Aphelion: ~2,890 AU (inbound); ~2,830 AU (outbound)
- Perihelion: 0.503 AU
- Semi-major axis: ~1,890 AU
- Eccentricity: 0.99973
- Orbital period: ~54,800 years (inbound); ~53,300 years (outbound)
- Inclination: 61.285°
- Longitude of ascending node: 143.73°
- Argument of periapsis: 333.13°
- Mean anomaly: 0.0004°
- Last perihelion: 18 March 1974
- T_{Jupiter}: 0.425
- Earth MOID: 0.444 AU
- Jupiter MOID: 0.667 AU

Physical characteristics
- Mean diameter: 5–10 km (3.1–6.2 mi)
- Geometric albedo: 0.70
- Comet total magnitude (M1): 8.6
- Apparent magnitude: 3.9 (1974 apparition)

C/1974 C1 (Bradfield) is a non-periodic comet that became visible to the naked eye in 1974. It is the second of 18 comets discovered by William A. Bradfield.
