= Bernardino I da Polenta =

Lord of Ravenna, Italy and Cervia, Italy (born 1346)

Bernardino I da Polenta (died 14 November 1359) was lord of Ravenna and Cervia from 1346 until his death.

He was the son of Ostasio I da Polenta. In 1346 he inherited the family lordships together with his brothers Pandolfo and Lamberto II. The following year Bernardino had both of them imprisoned in Cervia after one year, where they died of starvation.

He died in 1359 and was succeeded by his son Guido.

== See also ==
- Da Polenta family

Preceded by Guido II	Lord of Ravenna; 1346–1347; Together with Pandolfo and Lamberto II until 1347	Succeeded by Guido III
