= C/1979 Y1 (Bradfield) =

Long-period comet

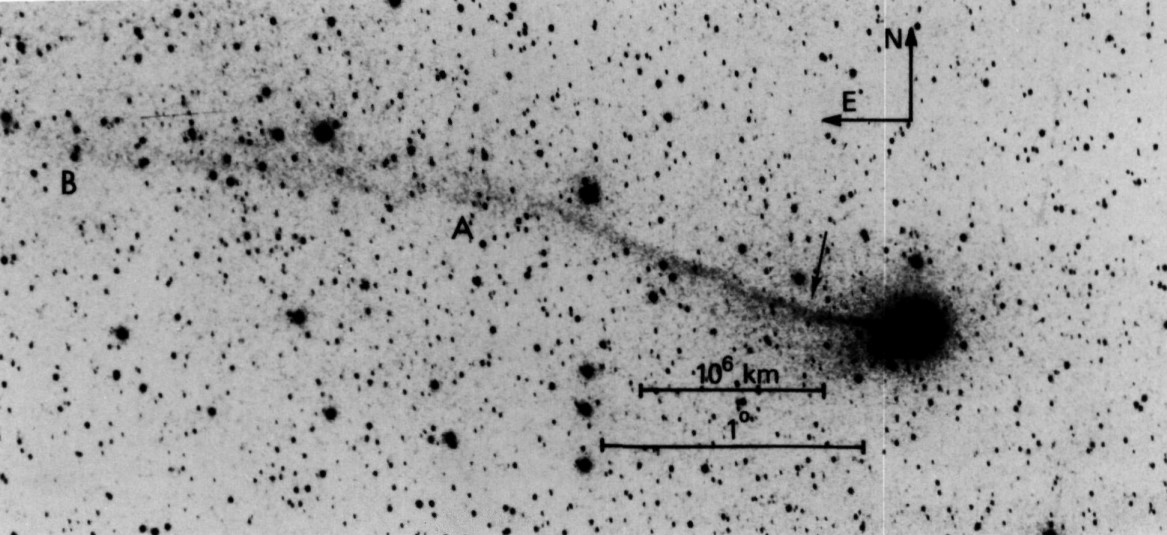
- Negative image of the comet on 6 February 1980

Discovery
- Discovered by: William A. Bradfield
- Discovery site: Dernancourt, South Australia
- Discovery date: 24 December 1979

Designations
- Alternative designations: 1979 X, 1979l

Orbital characteristics
- Epoch: 25 January 1980 (JD 2444263.5)
- Observation arc: 75 days
- Number of observations: 127
- Aphelion: ~90 AU
- Perihelion: 0.5453 AU
- Semi-major axis: 46 AU
- Eccentricity: 0.988
- Orbital period: 308±6 years
- Avg. orbital speed: 67.98 km/s
- Inclination: 148.602°
- Longitude of ascending node: 103.216°
- Argument of periapsis: 257.609°
- Last perihelion: 21 December 1979
- Next perihelion: ≈2287?
- T_{Jupiter}: –0.665
- Earth MOID: 0.067 AU
- Jupiter MOID: 1.693 AU

Physical characteristics
- Comet total magnitude (M1): 8.5
- Apparent magnitude: 5.0 (1980 apparition)

C/1979 Y1 (Bradfield), also known as Comet 1979X and 1979l, is a long period comet discovered by William A. Bradfield on 24 December 1979. The comet has an orbital period of 308 ± 6 years and last passed perihelion on 21 December 1979. It is thought to be the parent body of the July Pegasids meteor shower. It is expected to next come to perihelion around 2287.

== Observational history ==
The comet was discovered by amateur astronomer William A. Bradfield on 24 December 1979, using a 150mm f5.5 refractor at Dernancourt, South Australia. It was the 10th comet discovered by Bradfield, who had been searching for 67 hours following the discovery of his previous comet. The comet was discovered three days after perihelion and was estimated to have an apparent magnitude of 5. Bradfield also reported it had a tail over a degree long. The comet was then located in the constellation of Scorpius and moving southwards.

In January the comet remained around magnitude 5, as it was approaching Earth. On 8 January its tail was reported to be three degrees long as seen by 15×80 binoculars, while by 17 January it was reported to be two degrees long. The comet was moving southwards until 23 January, when it reached a declination of -80°, and consequently moved rapidly northwards, becoming visible from the northern hemisphere on 26 January, when the comet was 0.2 AU from Earth. On 6 February the ion tail of the comet appeared to undulate, shifting its axis by about 10 degrees in 27 minutes, due to a solar wind disturbance. In February the comet faded as it moved away from Earth and its tail became shorter, being 5 arcminutes long on 18 February. The comet was last detected on 17 March 1980, when it had an apparent magnitude of 11.7.

== Scientific results ==
=== Ultraviolet observations ===
The comet was favorably located in the sky to be observed by the International Ultraviolet Explorer. Comet Bradfield was the third comet whose ultraviolet spectrum was obtained from space after comets C/1975 V1 (West) and C/1978 T1 (Seargent). The observations started on 10 January 1980, when the comet was at an heliocentric distance of 0.71 AU and ended on 3 March 1980, when the comet was at a distance of 1.55 AU.

The most prominent feature was the Lyman-alpha line of the hydrogen, which appeared overexposed. Other lines observed were the OI λ1302, CI λλ1561, 1637 and 1931, and SI λ1813, while just over the noise level are the CII complex and CO. The ultraviolet spectrum was very similar to comet West, despite the difference in gas to dust ratio. In longer wavelengths were observed CO^{+}, CO^{+}_{2}, CS and OH bands, however the CO^{+} (0,0) and (1,0) lines were very weak or absent. The CS and SI lines appear concentrated near the nucleus of the comet.

The OH and hydrogen lines are the result of the photodissociation of water due to the solar radiation. It is possible that in the hydrogen component contribute and other molecules, but not as much. OH is further dissociated to hydrogen and oxygen. The water production at 0.71 AU was estimated to be 1–2.4 × 10^{29} mol/s. The vaporisation of water was decreasing at a rate of r^{−3.7}. The absence of some of the CO^{+} lines was considered surprising, while it was the first time CII Mulliken bands were unambiguously present in a comet. The presence of CS and sulfur is attributed to the photodissociation of carbon disulfide.

=== Other wavelengths ===
The spectrum of the comet in the visible light was obtained between 4–12 February 1980 by the Asiago Astrophysical Observatory. It revealed the presence of CN, C_{2}, C_{3}, NH_{2} and CH bands, while in the near infrared were observed the (3-0) Philipps band system of C_{2} and the (8-0), (7-0), (6-0) bands of H_{2}O(^{+}). The comet was also observed in near infrared on 29 January by the ESO with a spectrograph attached to 3.6 m telescope in spectral region between λ6600 and λ 11000. The spectrum revealed the presence of CN 2–0, 3–1, and 1-0 bands in the nucleus and CN 1-0 and 2-0 bands in the coma. Other lines present in the spectrum were the OI λ6300 and 6364 lines, and the NH2 sequence. The spectrum was similar to that of comet C/1969 T1 (Tago–Sato–Kosaka), although the NH2 line was relatively weaker.

It was attempted to observe the emission of HCN, CS, and CH_{3}OH in millimeter wavelengths, but was unsuccessful. In radiowaves there was conducted an unsuccessful search for hydroxyl radical, formaldehyde (H_{2}CO), methyl formate (HCOOCH_{3}), water, ammonia and a hydrogen recombination line, indicating a water production rate below approximately 7.4×10^{30} molecules/s.

There was also an attempt to image the comet in soft X-rays using the Einstein Observatory on 5 February 1980, but no X-ray emission was detected.

== Meteor showers ==
The comet is considered to be the parent body of the July Pegasids meteor shower. Comet C/1771 A1 has also being suggested to be the parent body of that shower and it could be possible that both C/1979 Y1 and C/1771 A1 were created by a single progenitor comet, which also created the Pegasids shower. Modeling of the meteor streams of the comet also suggests they create a daylight meteor shower too, with the radiant point in the constellation of Microscopium, near alpha Microscopii. It could also be the parent body of γ-Bootids, a meteor shower whose existence, however, is questionable, as it was identified by only two meteors. The streams that cause the Pegasids and daylight showers are dragged away from Earth's orbit due to the Poynting–Robertson effect, while the γ-Bootids are dragged into it.

Comet Bradfield could also produce a meteor shower on Mars, visible in the morning in the south hemisphere. The comet has a lower minimum orbit intersection distance with Mars than Earth, at 0.0497 AU (7.44 million km; 4.62 million mi).
