= C/1995 Q1 (Bradfield) =

Non-periodic comet

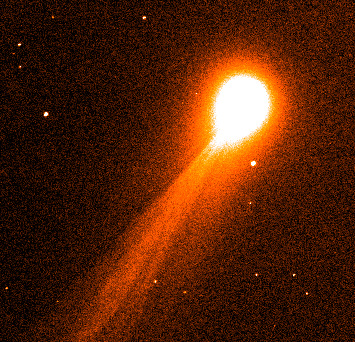
- Comet C/1995 Q1 (Bradfield) imaged by the European Southern Observatory on 20 August 1995

Discovery
- Discovered by: William A. Bradfield
- Discovery site: Dernancourt, South Australia
- Discovery date: 17 August 1995

Orbital characteristics
- Epoch: 23 October 1995 (JD 2450013.5)
- Observation arc: 173 days
- Number of observations: 156
- Aphelion: ~450 AU (inbound); ~380 AU (outbound)
- Perihelion: 0.436 AU
- Semi-major axis: ~220 AU
- Eccentricity: 0.99803
- Orbital period: ~3,360 years (inbound); ~2,640 years (outbound)
- Inclination: 147.39°
- Longitude of ascending node: 178.05°
- Argument of periapsis: 331.16°
- Mean anomaly: 0.016°
- Last perihelion: 31 August 1995
- T_{Jupiter}: –0.666
- Earth MOID: 0.440 AU
- Jupiter MOID: 0.144 AU

Physical characteristics
- Mean radius: 0.948 km (0.589 mi) (Note: Calculated mean radius using the formula: $\log_{10}\,(\,R\,)\ =\;0.9 +\;0.13 (\,H\,)$ Where $\,H\,$ is the comet's absolute total magnitude (M1))
- Comet total magnitude (M1): 7.1
- Apparent magnitude: 5.2 (1995 apparition)

C/1995 Q1 (Bradfield) is a non-periodic comet that became barely visible to the naked eye in August 1995. It was the 17th comet discovered by Australian astronomer, William A. Bradfield.

== Physical characteristics ==
Between August and September 1995, the Nançay Radio Observatory detected 18-cm emission lines of hydroxyl (OH) being produced from the comet. By November 1995, the Extreme Ultraviolet Explorer (EUVE) satellite searched the comet for any extreme ultraviolet (XUV) or soft x-ray radiation emanating from its coma, but neither were detected.
