= Lamberto I da Polenta =

Lamberto I da Polenta (died 1316) was lord of Ravenna from 1297 until his death.

The son of Guido I da Polenta, he inherited the lordship of Ravenna after the latter's death, while his brother Bernardino became lord of Cervia.

In 1312 he hosted Robert of Anjou in Ravenna during his struggle against the Emperor Henry VII.

He was succeeded by his nephew Guido Novello.

== See also ==
- Da Polenta family

Preceded by Guido I	Lord of Ravenna; 1297–1316	Succeeded by Guido II
