= Pandolfo da Polenta =

Past Italian lord

Pandolfo da Polenta (died 1347) was, for a short time, the joint lord of Ravenna, and Cervia from 1346 until his death.

He was the son of Ostasio I da Polenta. In 1346, he inherited the family lordships together with his brothers — Bernardino I and Lamberto II. Bernardino, however, had both Pandolfo, and Lamberto imprisoned in Cervia after one year, where they died of starvation.

== See also ==
- Da Polenta

Preceded by Guido II	Lord of Ravenna; 1346–1347; Together with Bernardino I and Lamberto II	Succeeded by Bernardino I
