= Astronomical Society of South Australia =

Oldest astronomical society in Australia

The Astronomical Society of South Australia (ASSA) was founded in 1892 and is the oldest society of its kind in Australia. It is the only representative body for amateur astronomy in the state of South Australia. It holds regular general monthly meetings, frequent meetings for members of specialised groups and has available two observatories, one with a 300mm telescope at The Heights School within easy reach of Adelaide and used primarily for public viewing, and a second at Stockport with 500mm and 450mm telescopes presently in service and a larger 36-inch instrument currently being considered.

== Membership ==
The ASSA has approximately 500 members. People of all ages are able to join.

== Observatories and facilities ==
The ASSA has a choice of facilities available to members and guests:

- Stockport Observatory - this was badly damaged in a severe storm in 2010, but in late 2013 the Astronomical Society of South Australia was given $50,000 by the State Government to pay for half of the cost of a new dome. The observatory is used as a teaching tool, hosting groups of curious students and members the public, but it also has an impressive research record.
- The Heights Observatory
- Tooperang Observing Site
- Whyalla Middleback Observing Site
- Adelaide Planetarium
- The ASSA Library

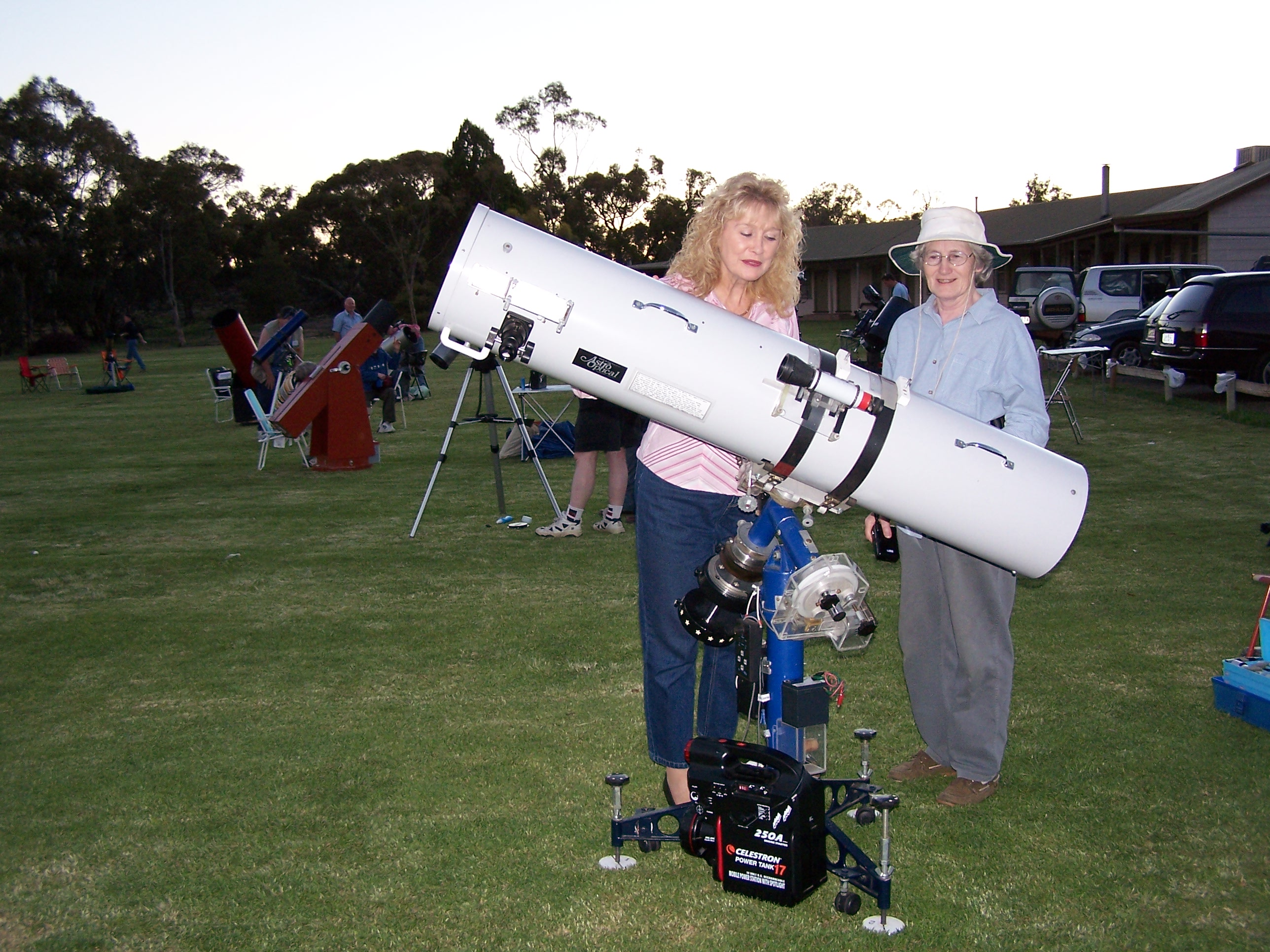
Setting up for the VicSouth Desert Spring Star Party

The VicSouth Desert Spring Star Party is an annual weekend of astronomy, jointly hosted by the Astronomical Society of Victoria and the Astronomical Society of South Australia. It is held around October–November near the town of Nhill in western Victoria, Australia.

== Notable Members ==
- Professor Sir Robert Chapman CMG, BA, M.I.C.E., MIEAust (1866–1942) was president for 32 years.
- William A. (Bill) Bradfield AM (1927-2014) - with 18 comets and 1 asteroid bearing his name. He was a rocket propulsion and ballistics expert (retired). There is a Bradfield Award given by the Astronomical Society of South Australia to an amateur who displays exceeding accomplishment in a given year in the field of astronomy, given in honour of Bill's achievements. Bill was a long-time ASSA Life Member, past-President (1977–79) and was inducted into the ASSA Hall of Fame in 2013.

== See also ==
- List of telescopes of Australia
- List of astronomical societies
