= Henry Sandford (bishop) =

13th-century Bishop of Rochester

- Bishop of Rochester
- Elected: 26 December 1226
- Term ended: probably 24 February 1235
- Predecessor: Benedict of Sausetun
- Successor: Richard Wendene
- Other posts: Archdeacon of Canterbury

Orders
- Consecration: 9 May 1227

Personal details
- Died: probably 24 February 1235
- Denomination: Catholic

Henry Sandford was a medieval Bishop of Rochester.

Sandford was a royal official before becoming a canon of the diocese of Salisbury and was Archdeacon of Canterbury from about 1213 until he was chosen for Rochester.

Sandford was elected to the see of Rochester on 26 December 1226 and consecrated on 9 May 1227. He was enthroned at Rochester Cathedral on 16 May 1227.

Sandford probably died on 24 February 1235.

== Citations ==
Catholic Church titles
| Preceded by Benedict of Sausetun | Bishop of Rochester; 1226–1235 | Succeeded by Richard Wendene |
