= Bernardino da Polenta (lord of Cervia, died 1313) =

Lord of Cervia from 1297 until 1313

Bernardino da Polenta (died April 22, 1313) was lord of Cervia from 1297 until his death. He was the son of Guido I da Polenta.

In 1302–1305, he waged war to Cesena for the possession of Cesenatico, and in 1303 fought with Florence in Mugello. In 1308 he was shortly lord of Ferrara in opposition to Azzo VIII d'Este.

In 1312, he fought alongside his brother Lamberto, lord of Ravenna, and Robert of Anjou, against Emperor Henry VII.

== See also ==
- Da Polenta
- Guelphs and Ghibellines

| Preceded by Guido I da Polenta | Lord of Cervia; 1297–1313 | Succeeded by Bannino da Polenta |
