= Obizzo da Polenta =

- Lord of Ravenna
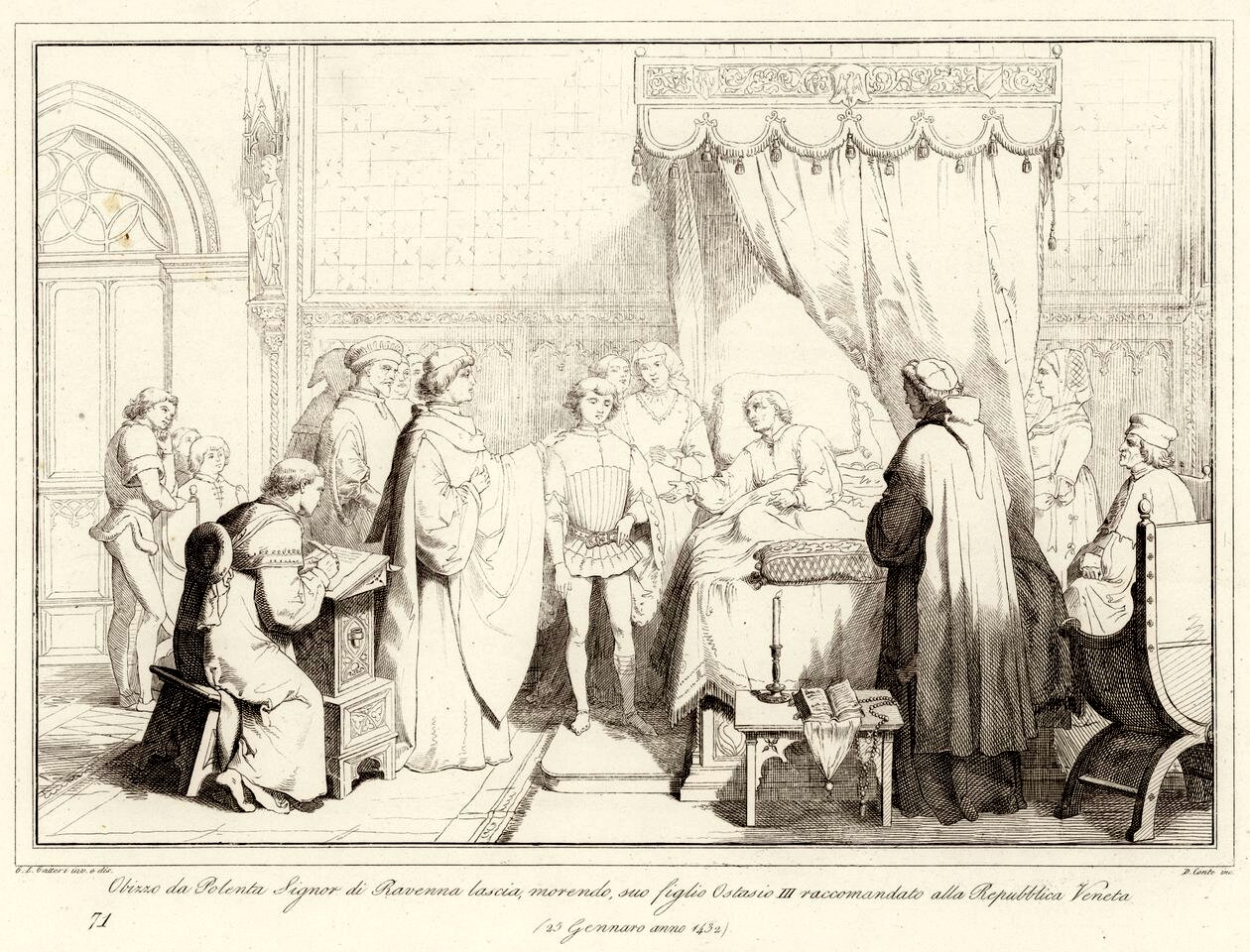
- Obizzo, at his deathbed, entrusts his son Ostasio III da Polenta to the guardianship of the Republic of Venice

Lord of Ravenna
- Reign: 1389–1431
- Predecessor: Guido III da Polenta
- Successor: Ostasio III da Polenta
- Died: 30 January 1431; Ravenna
- Noble family: Da Polenta family
- Spouse: Elisabetta Malatesta
- Father: Guido III da Polenta

Obizzo da Polenta (died 30 January 1431) was an Italian nobleman and politician, and the lord of Ravenna of the da Polenta family.

== Biography ==
Obizzo da Polenta was the son of Guido III da Polenta, the Lord of Ravenna from 1359 to 1389. In 1389, Obizzo overthrew and imprisoned his father with the help of his brothers Bernardino, Ostasio, Aldobrandino, Azzo, and Pietro. After his father's death from starvation later that year, his brother Aldobrandino assumed power over the city. His other brothers died in the following years, although it has been suggested that they may have been assassinated by Obizzo himself. When his last brother, and Lord of Ravenna, Aldobrandino, died in 1406, Obizzo gained undisputed power over the city.

In 1404, Obizzo signed a treaty with the Republic of Venice. In exchange for Obizzo's role in the Venetian war against the Carraresi, Venice helped Obizzo fight against the Este of Ferrara. During the Venetian war, Obizzo was imprisoned, but he was freed after payment of 8,000 ducats. In 1406, he asked Venice to send a podestà in Ravenna as protection for him and his sons. In exchange for this protection, Ravennate lands fell under Venice's power.

He was Lord of Revenna from 1406 to 1431. He died in 1431 and was succeeded by his son Ostasio under the Venetian regency. However, when Ostasio abandoned the alliance with Venice, they ousted him and annexed Ravenna.

== Marriage ==
Obizzo was married in 1414 to Elisabetta Malatest, daughter of Andrea Malatesta di Cesena

Preceded by Guido III	Lord of Ravenna; Sole ruler from 1406; 1389–1431	Succeeded by Ostasio III
