= Ostasio III da Polenta =

Lord of Ravenna from 1431 to 1441

- Lord of Ravenna
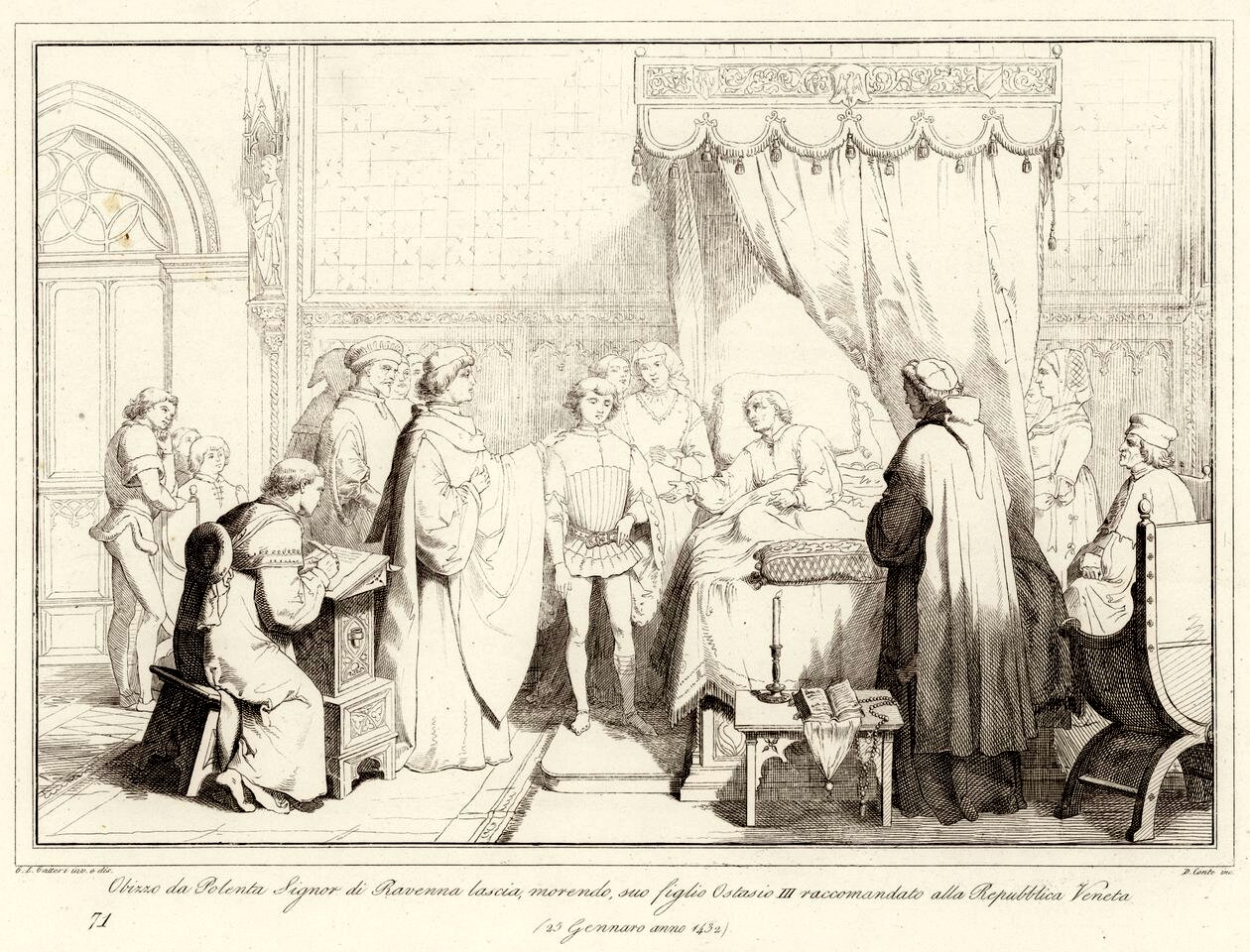
- Obizzo da Polenta entrusting his son Ostasio to the Republic of Venice

Lord of Ravenna
- Reign: 1431–1441
- Predecessor: Obizzo da Polenta
- Successor: None (annexed by the Republic of Venice)
- Died: 1447; Candia, Crete
- Noble family: Da Polenta family
- Father: Obizzo da Polenta

Ostasio III da Polenta (died 1447) was the last lord of Ravenna of the da Polenta family.

The son of Obizzo da Polenta, he inherited Ravenna, but under the control of a provveditore from the nearby Republic of Venice. In 1438, the condottiero Niccolò Piccinino, commander of the Milanese troops, invaded the lordship, forcing Ostasio to ally himself with the Visconti of Milan against Venice. The latter sent a fleet that conquered Ravenna without opposition, putting an end to the Polentani seigniory in February 1441.

Ostasio was exiled to a Benedictine convent in Candia, in Crete, where he died in 1447, probably assassinated.

== See also ==
- Wars in Lombardy

Preceded by Obizzo da Polenta	Lord of Ravenna; 1431–1441	Annexed by the Republic of Venice
