= C/1987 P1 (Bradfield) =

Non-periodic comet

Discovery
- Discovered by: William A. Bradfield
- Discovery site: Dernancourt, Australia
- Discovery date: 11 August 1987

Designations
- Alternative designations: 1987 XXIX, 1987s

Orbital characteristics
- Epoch: 29 November 1989 (JD 2447128.5)
- Observation arc: 245 days
- Number of observations: 611
- Aphelion: ~330 AU
- Perihelion: 0.869 AU
- Semi-major axis: ~165 AU
- Eccentricity: 0.99474
- Orbital period: ~2,120 years
- Inclination: 34.088°
- Longitude of ascending node: 268.09°
- Argument of periapsis: 73.899°
- Mean anomaly: 0.010°
- Last perihelion: 7 November 1987
- T_{Jupiter}: 0.988
- Earth MOID: 0.203 AU
- Jupiter MOID: 1.223 AU

Physical characteristics
- Mean radius: ~1.3 km (0.81 mi)
- Comet total magnitude (M1): 6.0

C/1987 P1 (Bradfield) is a non-periodic comet that became visible to the naked eye in 1987. It is the 13th comet discovered by Australian astronomer, William A. Bradfield.

== Physical characteristics ==
Spectrophotometric observations of the comet revealed high concentrations of (Mg,Fe)_{2}SiO_{4} (olivine) in its coma, in addition to typical emissions of cyanogen (CN) and atomic carbon (C_{2} and C_{3}) that is typically found in other comets. Estimates of its mass loss rate is measured to be at approximately 1,000 kg/sec while it was 1.45 AU (217 million km) from the Sun. Assuming that the entire sun-illuminated hemisphere of the comet's nucleus sheds material, this results in a lower limit for the nucleus radius of about 1.3 km (0.81 mi).
