= Walter de Merton =

Bishop and Chancellor of England (c. 1205 – 1277)

The Right Reverend Walter de Merton
- Bishop of Rochester
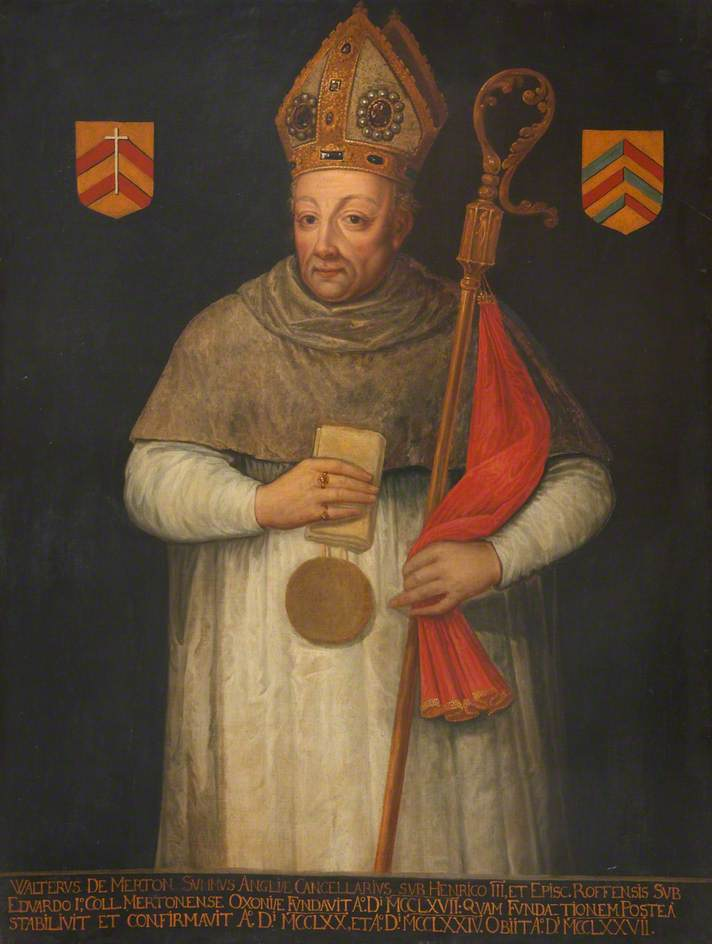
- Wilhelm Sonmans's fictitious portrait of Walter de Merton, c. 1670
- Church: Roman Catholic
- Elected: July 1274
- Term ended: 27 October 1277
- Predecessor: Lawrence of St Martin
- Successor: John Bradfield
- Other posts: prebendary of St. Paul's, London prebendary of Exeter Cathedral canon of Wells Cathedral

Orders
- Consecration: 21 October 1274 by Robert Kilwardby, O.P.

Personal details
- Born: c. 1205 probably Merton, England
- Died: 27 October 1277
- Buried: Rochester Cathedral
- Coat of arms

Lord Chancellor
- In office 1261–1263
- Monarch: Henry III of England
- Preceded by: Nicholas of Ely
- Succeeded by: Nicholas of Ely office2 = Lord Chancellor
- In office 1274–1277
- Monarchs: Henry III of England, Edward I of England
- Preceded by: Lawrence of St Martin
- Succeeded by: Richard Middleton

Bishop of Rochester
- In office 1274–1277
- Monarch: Edward I of England
- Preceded by: Lawrence of St Martin
- Succeeded by: John Bradfield

Arms of de Merton: Or, three chevrons party per pale azure and gules counter-changed

Walter de Merton (c. 1205 – 27 October 1277) was Lord Chancellor of England, Archdeacon of Bath, founder of Merton College, Oxford, and Bishop of Rochester. For the first two years of the reign of Edward I he was – in all but name – Regent of England during the King's absence abroad. He died in 1277 after falling from his horse, and is buried in Rochester Cathedral.

== Early life ==
Walter was born in around 1205 to a land-owning family at Basingstoke; beyond that there is no definite information about the date or place of birth. His mother was Christina Fitz-Oliver and his father William. By 1237 both his parents were dead, and Walter was a clerk in holy orders. He was perhaps educated at Merton Priory, but certainly was employed there as a young clerk, receiving from it the benefice of Cuddington. In 1241, Walter became clerk to Nicholas Farnham, quondam rector of another of Merton's parishes, Long Ditton, and now promoted to bishop of Durham.

== Career ==
In 1241, Walter already held a number of livings in various parts of the country; in 1256 he was an agent for Walter of Kirkham, bishop of Durham, in a lawsuit. Walter was also prothonotary of the chancery in 1258.

Walter rose to prominence as a skilled lawyer and negotiator. When Henry III went to France to negotiate the 1259 Treaty of Paris, Walter was left behind as a trusted royal servant. On 29 March, the Justiciar ordered 100 barons to muster in London for a secret meeting that would take them overseas. Only a few days later Walter could be seen at Malden, Surrey, assisting in the registration of the Justiciar's army. The writs were pre-dated, then considered a new procedure at some risk to the messengers' delivery of the writs to Sheriffs in the locality. Walter also helped in the complex financial dealing with King Louis IX of France, when he reached London on 30 April. In return for a promise of peace, Henry received 12,500 Livres, the equivalent of 500 Knight's Fees. By 1264, this would be a total of 134,000 Livres of subsidy from the King of France. Walter played an invaluable part in the administration of Henry's revenues. By 1259, Walter had suitably impressed the king that he was granted a prebendary of St. Paul's, London.

=== Lord Chancellor ===
On 12 July 1261 Henry III made him chancellor, in place of Nicholas of Ely. A month earlier, the Papal Bulls in support of Henry's coup d'état had ensured it was safe for the king to return to the Tower of London. With a mercenary at his back, he had marched from Dover over Whitsun. In London, Walter was reinstalled as chancellor in a 'resumption of royal power', having been briefly challenged by the baronial movement.

Walter provided legal arguments for the collection of tallage, rejection of the baronial constitution, the appointment of royal Sheriffs, and a renewed attempt to justify the collection of Customs. Now only a cussed Philip Basset, among the barons, remained aloof from the fray, when the King's new ministrations emerged against the Provisions of Oxford. As one of the arbitrators, Walter met the barons with Walerand and Basset. He was probably not the king's first choice among the nobility, but the sticking point remained the method by which to appoint sheriffs, from 'faithful men and people' in the shires.

Later that month of May 1261, De Merton had helped define Jus regalitatis, a law that prohibited criticism of the King; a flagrant breach of the commitment at Oxford. A year later, Henry would describe the sheriffs as bachelarii regis qui tenent comitatus or his bachelors. For the regents were men of the second rank, not nobles, yet they owed their elevated status entirely to royal service.

In 1262, Walter acquired lucrative sinecures such as the new prebendary of Exeter, and became a canon of Wells. The following year, when de Montfort was at the height of his powers, Walter was urged by the bishop of Worcester to accept a form of peace satis competens et honesta. It is possible that Walter was a member of Richard of Cornwall's deputation sent from Windsor to greet Montfort's army coming east from London and Kent. But on 16 July, when the king surrendered peace terms, and three days later de Montfort assumed power, Walter also left office.

=== Merton College ===
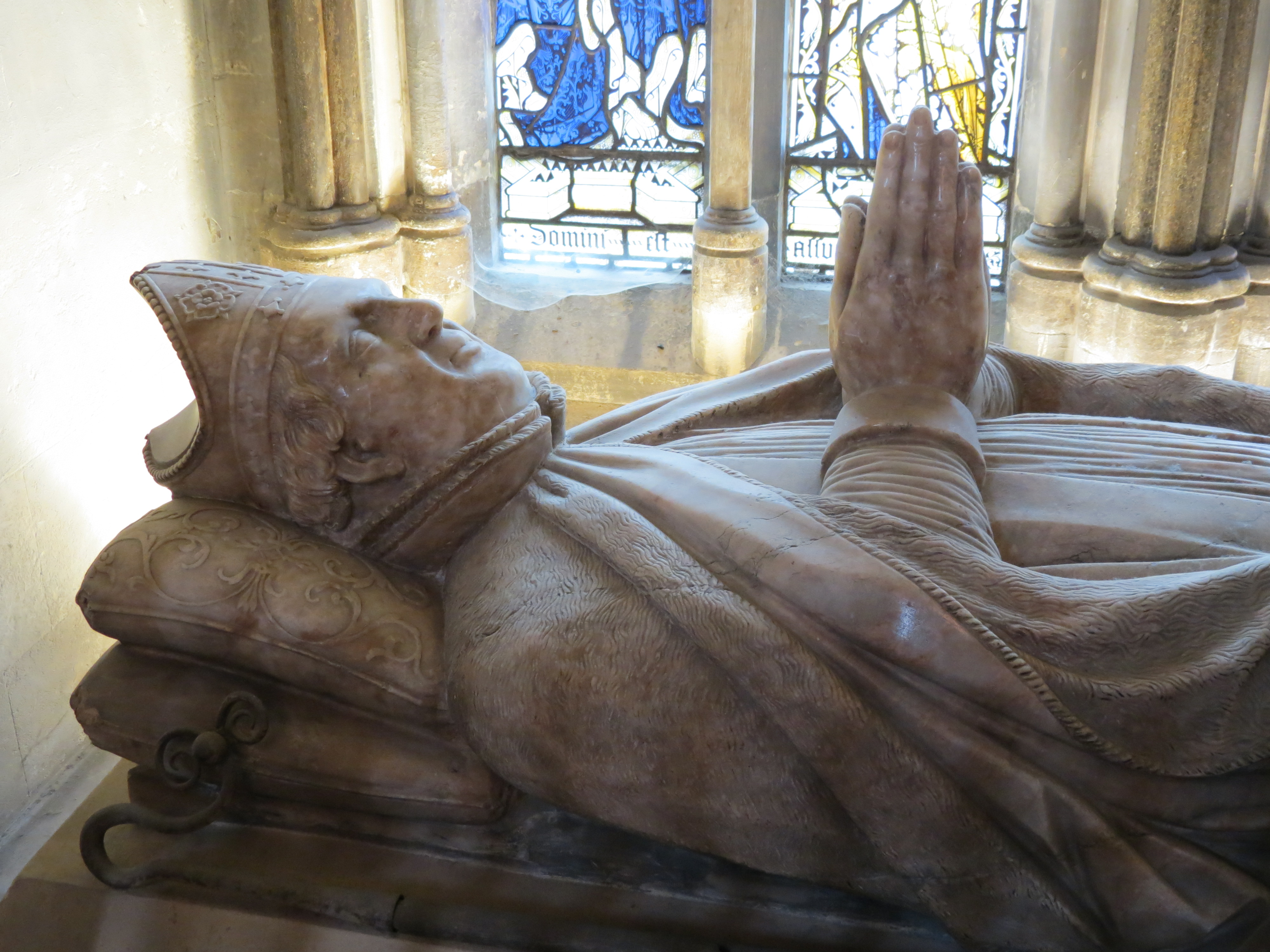
Tomb of Walter de Merton in Rochester Cathedral

In 1261, two manors in Surrey were set aside for the support of "scholars residing at the schools" at Merton Priory; it was the beginning of Merton College. In 1264, Walter drew up statutes for a "house of the scholars of Merton", at Malden in Surrey; ten years later these scholars were transferred to Oxford, and a permanent house was established. Merton College, thus founded and endowed, was one of the earliest examples of collegiate life at Oxford. De Merton's statutes provided for a common corporate life under the rule of a warden but, as vows were to be taken and scholars entering a monastic order forfeited their scholarship, the college was really a place of training for the secular clergy.

Freed from the responsibilities of government, Walter turned his attention to his college again. The statutes were redrafted and scholars moved permanently to Oxford. They were established on the site of the parish church of St John whose advowson he had obtained in the early 1260s and where he had been buying adjoining houses and halls since 1264. In 1270 he bought Kibworth Harcourt, Leicestershire as part of the confiscated estate of Saer de Harcourt, an erstwhile supporter of Simon de Montfort. While De Merton was labouring for the establishment of Merton College, the barons emerged triumphant. Walter, a partisan friend of Henry III, was removed from the chancellorship in 1263. He was not immediately restored after the king's victory, but he did renew his acquaintance with the royal circle, by now at Windsor.

=== Edward I and Chancellor Merton ===
Walter is mentioned as a Justiciar in 1271. He was re-appointed as Lord Chancellor, four days after Henry III's death on 16 November 1272. For the first two years of Edward I's reign he was in all but name regent of England during the king's absence abroad. He was tasked with investigation into the 20,000 marks collected (1266) from tallage, about which many complaints had sparked the ire of the Citizens of London. Violent clashes on the streets worried King Edward in his first year on the throne. The vulgus (common people) clamoured for heads at the Guildhall, and the election of the baronial party. Merton argued that the communa election was a matter for Parliament, whereas the Aldermanic vote clashed with the other jurisdiction. Merton's joint tribunal, appointed before Henry III's death, was redundant until Edward I could appoint a royal warden. On 11 November, Edward wisely moved, prompted by his Chancellor, to enable counsellors to control the 'men of Belial'. The violence subsided: Merton successfully negotiated the elected Walter Hervey as Mayor, and so he "announced before all the people at the cross of St Paul's that the aldermen had agreed to have Walter as mayor for that year." The contemporary historian, Matthew Paris, who died in 1275, left voluminous histories about these events.

=== Bishop of Rochester ===
Edward I had left England in 1268 to participate in the Ninth Crusade and, in the new king's absence, Merton stood in his place, effective Regent of England. Edward commanded the respect of his household and wardrobe, anticipating a welcome return. This is signified in a letter of 9 August sent from Melun, France in which Walter was promised the King's full support. However, on Edward's return to England, Walter was dismissed as Lord Chancellor on 21 September 1274, in favour of Robert Burnell, who became a strong ally of the Edwardian regime. Walter's compensation for this was the see of Rochester, to which he was elected in late July 1274, being consecrated on the 21 October following.

== Death and legacy ==
He eagerly awaited in anticipation the appointment of a Warden of the new Merton College. For the last three years of his life, Walter divided his time between his duties in Rochester and the supervision of his fledgling academic house. On a journey back from Oxford in 1277, while fording the Medway, he fell from his horse; and died two days later on 27 October 1277 from his injuries. He was buried in Rochester Cathedral, where his tomb can still be visited. Walter de Merton was described in the Annales monastici as a man of liberality and great worldly learning, ever ready in his assistance to the religious orders.

== Bibliography ==
- Fryde, E. B.; Greenway, D. E.; Porter, S.; Roy, I. (1996). Handbook of British Chronology (Third revised ed.). Cambridge: Cambridge University Press. ISBN 0-521-56350-X.
- Martin, G. H.; Highfield, J. R. L. (1997). A History of Merton College. Oxford: Oxford University Press. ISBN 0-19-920183-8.
- Franks, Michael (2003). The Clerk of Basingstoke: A Life of Walter de Merton. Oxford: Alden Press.

Political offices
| Preceded by Nicholas of Ely | Lord Chancellor; 1261–1263 | Succeeded by Nicholas of Ely |
| Preceded by Richard Middleton | Lord Chancellor; 1272–1274 | Succeeded by Robert Burnell |
Catholic Church titles
| Preceded by Lawrence of St Martin | Bishop of Rochester; 1274–1277 | Succeeded by John Bradfield |
