= Guido III da Polenta =

Lord of Ravenna, Italy (born 1359)

- Lord of Ravenna

Lord of Ravenna
- Reign: 1359–1389
- Predecessor: Bernardino I da Polenta
- Successor: Obizzo da Polenta and brothers
- Born: c. 1359
- Died: 1389; Ravenna
- Noble family: Da Polenta
- Spouse: Elisa d'Este
- Issue: Bernardino II da Polenta, Ostasio II da Polenta, Obizzo da Polenta, Aldobrandino da Polenta, Azzo, Pietro, Samaritana
- Father: Bernardino I da Polenta

Guido III da Polenta (died 1389) was a lord of Ravenna, Italy and a member of the da Polenta family.

He peacefully held the city's government for 30 years after the death of his father, Bernardino I. Guido married the daughter of Obizzo III d'Este of Ferrara, Elisa d'Este, who gave him numerous children. Most of the daughters, including Samaritana da Polenta, married other lords of Romagna and northern Italy, such as Antonio I della Scala.

In 1389 he was imprisoned by his sons Bernardino, Ostasio, Obizzo, Aldobrandino, Azzo and Pietro, and died in jail.

== Sources ==
- Troya, Carlo (1826). Del Veltro allegorico di Dante (in Italian).

Preceded by Bernardino I	Lord of Ravenna; 1359–1389	Succeeded by Obizzo da Polenta and his brothers
