= Lamberto da Cingoli =

University of Bologna

Lamberto da Cingoli was an inquisitor in 14th century Italy. He is known for suspending Cecco d'Ascoli from a professorship of medicine at the University of Bologna in 1324. Sentence against d'Ascoli was pronounced on October 16, 1324. Lamberto da Cingoli was a Dominican friar.
