= Ken Bradfield =

Canadian sailor (born 1929)

Kenneth Alexander Bradfield (born 3 February 1929) is a Canadian former sailor who competed in the 1952 Summer Olympics.
