= Benedict of Sausetun =

13th-century Bishop of Rochester

- Bishop of Rochester
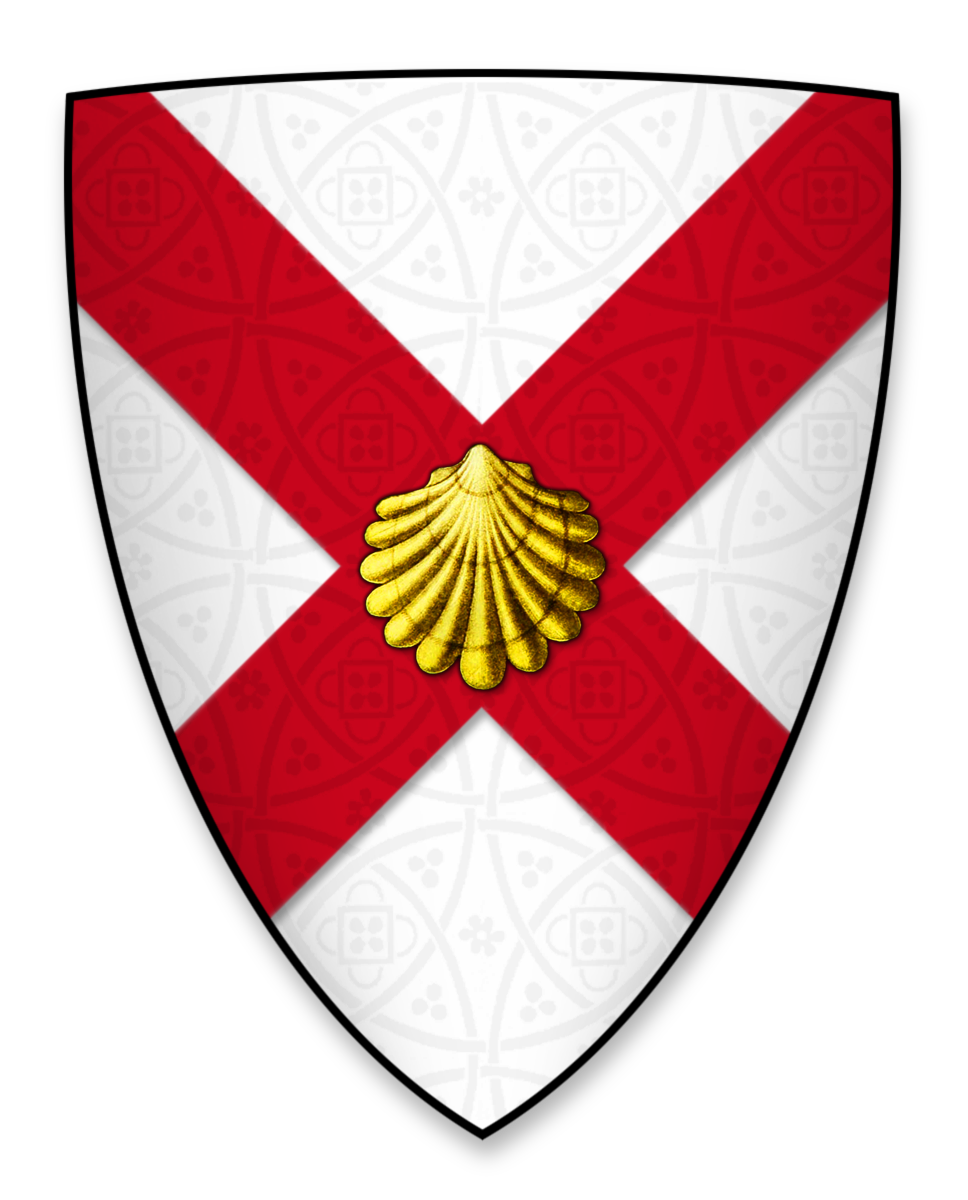
- Arms displayed by Benedict of Sausetun.png
- Elected: 13 December 1214
- Term ended: 18 December 1226
- Predecessor: Gilbert Glanvill
- Successor: Henry Sandford
- Previous post: Precentor of St Paul's, London

Orders
- Consecration: either 25 January 1215 or 22 February 1215

Personal details
- Died: 18 December 1226
- Denomination: Catholic

Benedict of Sausetun (or Benedict of Sawston) was a medieval Bishop of Rochester.

== Life ==
Benedict was from Sawston in Cambridgeshire. He was a canon of the diocese of London from 1196 and held the prebend of Neseden. From 1204 he was precentor of St Paul's, London. He was elected to the see of Rochester on 13 December 1214 and was consecrated on either 25 January 1215 or 22 February 1215. At some point between 1217 and 1221 he served as a baron of the exchequer. He died on 18 December 1226 and was buried on 21 December 1226.

== Citations ==
Catholic Church titles
| Preceded by Gilbert Glanvill | Bishop of Rochester; 1214–1226 | Succeeded by Henry Sandford |
