= Pegasids =

Meteor shower

July Pegasids
- Celestial map of Pegasus
- Parent body: C/1979 Y1 (Bradfield)

Radiant
- Constellation: Pegasus
- Right ascension: 23^{h} 12^{m} -0^{s}
- Declination: +10° 08′ 00″

Properties
- Occurs during: July 4 to Aug 8
- Date of peak: July 11
- Velocity: 64.1 km/s
- Zenithal hourly rate: 3

The meteor shower of the July Pegasids occurs between July 4 and Aug 8. It is a weak meteor shower that has its maximum around July 11 having a ZHR of only 3 meteors per hour. The meteors have, however, an atmosphere entry speed of about 64 km/s.

The Radiant of the Pegasids is in the constellation of Pegasus, around 5 degrees to the west of the star α Pegasi. The origin of this meteor shower is probably the comet C/1979 Y1 (Bradfield). C/1979 Y1 has an orbital period of 308 years, and should return around 2287.

For Central Europe, the best time to watch them is the second half of the night, as the radiant reaches at that time a sufficient height over the horizon.
