= Aldobrandino da Polenta =

Aldobrandino da Polenta (died 1406) was a lord of Ravenna of the da Polenta family.

He was the son of Guido III da Polenta: Aldobrandino and his brothers imprisoned him in 1389 to seize the power in the city. When Aldobrandino died in 1406, the last surviving brother, Obizzo, inherited the sole rule in Ravenna.

== See also ==
- Wars in Lombardy

Preceded by Guido III	Lord of Ravenna; 1389–1406	Succeeded by Obizzo da Polenta
