= Geoffrey Bradfield =

South African cricketer (born 1948)

Geoffrey Winston Bradfield (born 28 February 1948) was a South African cricketer who played for Northamptonshire. He was born in Grahamstown, Cape Province.

Bradfield made a single first-class appearance, during the 1970 season, against Cambridge University. Coming in at 6, Bradfield batted quite well scoring 50 runs in the first innings in the only innings he batted. Northamptonshire won the match by 103 runs however, surprisingly, Bradfield never played again.
