= Henry Joseph Steele Bradfield =

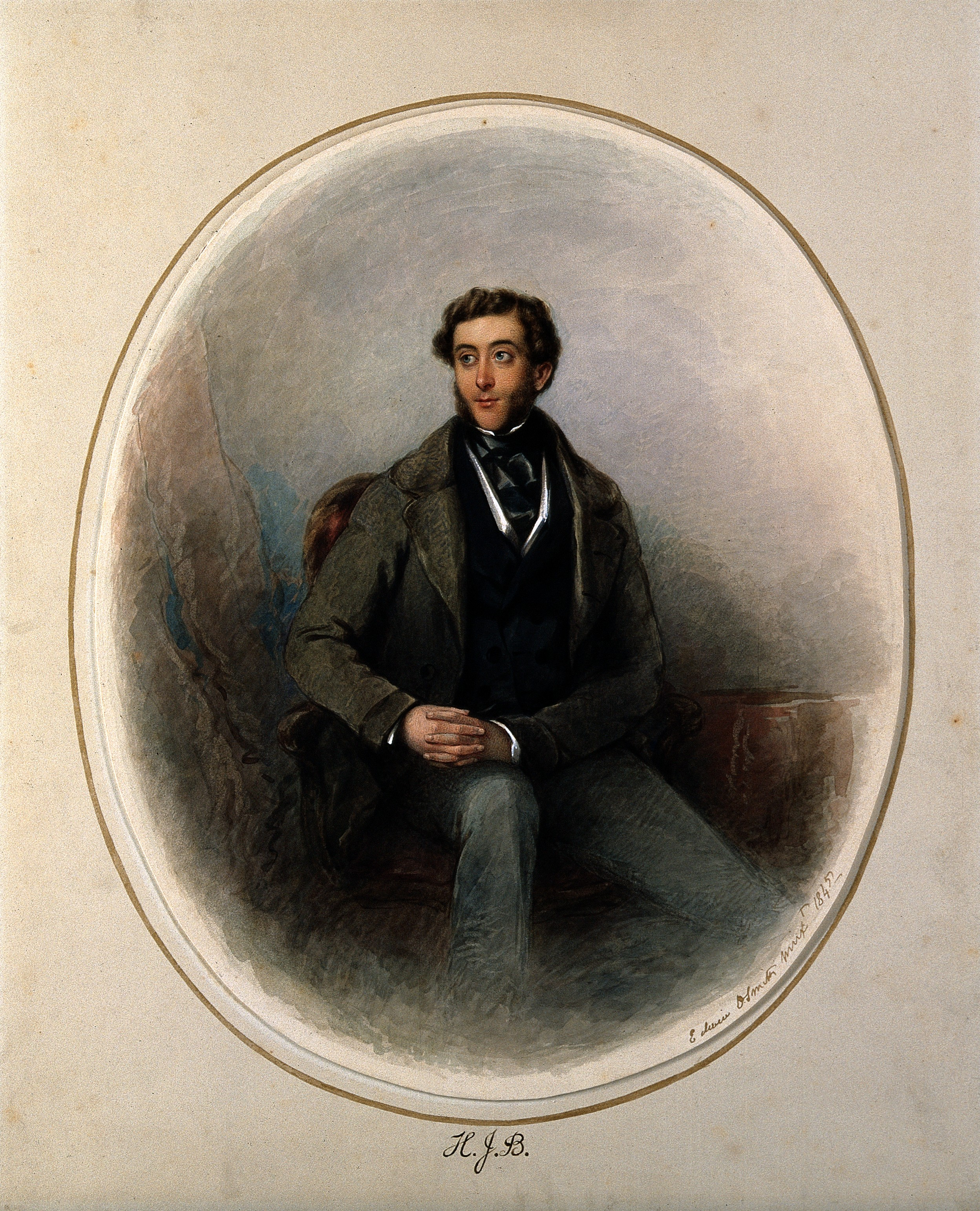
Henry Joseph Bradfield Watercolour painting by E. D. Smith, 1845.

Henry Joseph Steele Bradfield (1805–1852) was a colonial official and writer.

Bradfield was born on 18 May 1805 in Derby Street, Westminster, where his father, Thomas Bradfield, was a coal merchant. Whilst still under age he published in 1825 Waterloo, or the British Minstrel, a poem. He was bred to the art of surgery, and on 26 April 1826 left England in the schooner Unicorn in Lord Cochrane's expedition to Greece, during which he was present in several engagements by land and sea. After his return he published The Athenaid, or Modern Grecians, a poem, 1830; Tales of the Cyclades, poems, 1830; and in 1839 edited a work entitled A Russian's Reply to the Marquis de Custine's "Russia".

On 1 September 1832 he received from the King of the Belgians a commission as sous-lieutenant in the Bataillon Etranger of Belgium, and was appointed to the 1st regiment of lancers. At one time he held a commission in the Royal West Middlesex Militia. He was appointed on 31 December 1835 stipendiary magistrate in Tobago, from which he was removed to Trinidad on 13 May 1836. He was reappointed to the southern or Cedros district on 13 April 1839, but soon returned to England, having been superseded in consequence of a quarrel with some other colonial officer.

In 1841 he again went to the West Indies in the capacity of private secretary to Colonel Macdonald, lieutenant-governor of Dominica, and in 1842 he acted for some time as colonial secretary in Barbados. The charges which had occasioned his previous return were, however, renewed, and the government cancelled his appointment.

From that period he lived very precariously. He turned his moderate literary talents to account, and among some communications he made to the Gentleman's Magazine were articles on "The Last of the Paleologi" in January 1843, and a "Memoir of Major-general Thomas Dundas and the Expedition to Gaudaloupe" in August, September, and October in the same year. Latterly he practised all the arts of the professional mendicant.

Bradfield killed himself by drinking a bottle of prussic acid at the St. Alban's Hotel, 12 Charles Street, St James's Square, Westminster, on 11 October 1852.
