= C/2004 F4 (Bradfield) =

Non-periodic comet

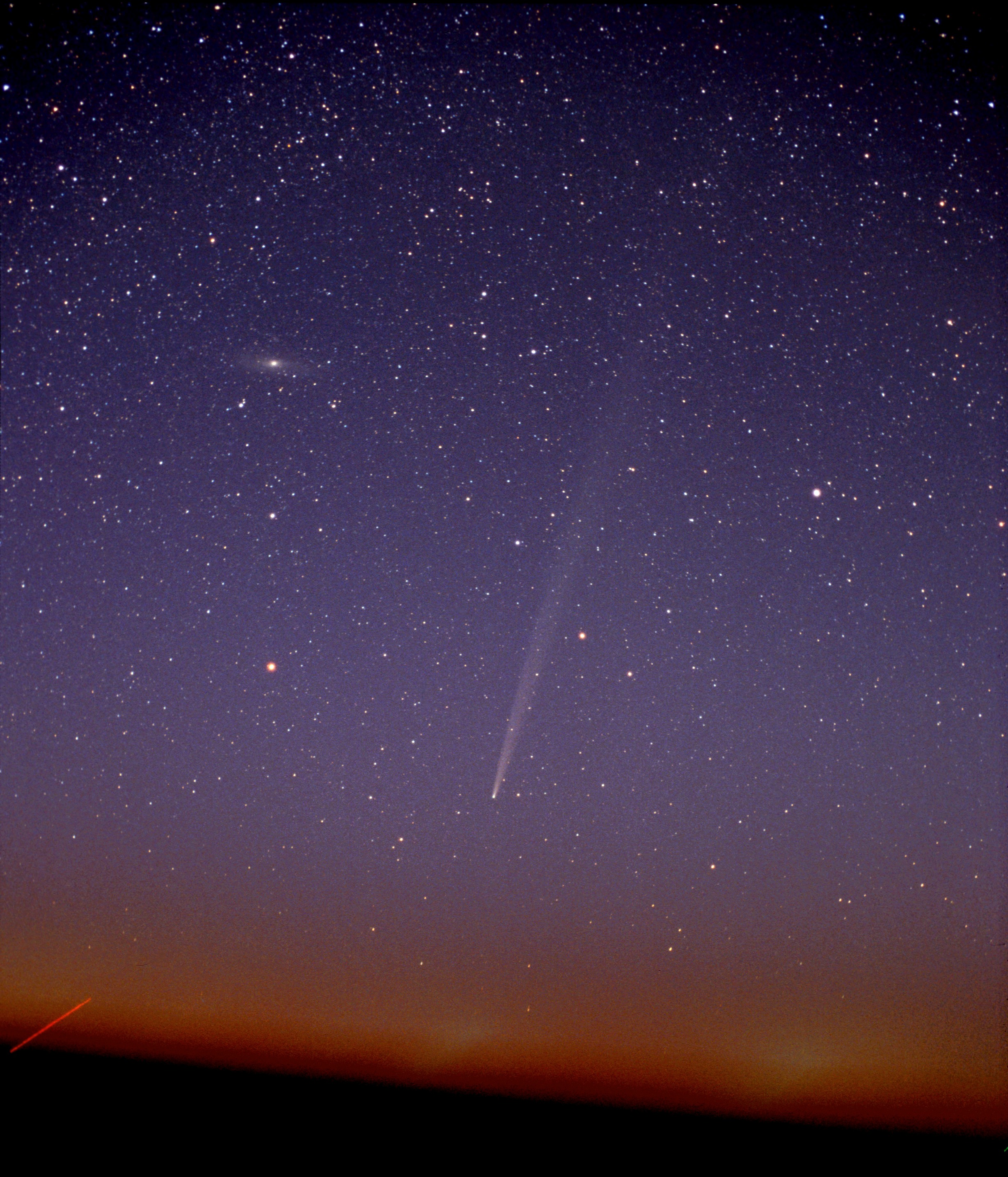
- Comet Bradfield photographed from Colorado, USA on 20 May 2004

Discovery
- Discovered by: William A. Bradfield
- Discovery site: Yankalilla, South Australia
- Discovery date: 23 March 2004

Orbital characteristics
- Epoch: 1 June 2004 (JD 2453157.5)
- Observation arc: 155 days
- Number of observations: 301
- Aphelion: 475 AU
- Perihelion: 0.168 AU
- Semi-major axis: 238 AU
- Eccentricity: 0.99929
- Orbital period: 3,660 years
- Inclination: 63.16°
- Longitude of ascending node: 222.78°
- Argument of periapsis: 332.79°
- Last perihelion: 17 April 2004
- T_{Jupiter}: 0.251
- Earth MOID: 0.32 AU
- Jupiter MOID: 0.56 AU

Physical characteristics
- Mean radius: 0.703 km (0.437 mi) (Note: Calculated mean radius using the formula: $\log_{10}\,(\,R\,)\ =\;0.9 +\;0.13 (\,H\,)$ Where $\,H\,$ is the comet's absolute total magnitude (M1))
- Comet total magnitude (M1): 8.1
- Apparent magnitude: 2.5 (2004 apparition)

C/2004 F4 (Bradfield) is a non-periodic comet discovered by amateur astronomer William A. Bradfield on 23 March 2004. The comet brightened to an apparent magnitude of about 3.3.

== Observational history ==
The comet was discovered by amateur astronomer William A. Bradfield from Yankalilla, South Australia on 23 March 2004 with a 0.25-m reflector telescope, during his search for sungrazing comets. That was Bradfield's 18th comet discovery. The comet was then located in evening twilight and its magnitude was estimated to be about magnitude 8. Robert H. McNaught observed the comet on 9 April 2004 and estimated that the comet had a magnitude of 5, while Terry Lovejoy estimated its magnitude to be 3.3 on 12 April, while its tail measured half a degree long. At that time, two more naked eye comets were visible in the sky, C/2001 Q4 (NEAT) and C/2002 T7 (LINEAR).

The comet reached perihelion on 17 April 2004, at a distance of 0.168 AU (25.1 million km; 15.6 million mi). The comet became visible in the C3 coronograph of the Solar and Heliospheric Observatory (SOHO) between 16 and 20 April 2004. The comet had a bright head and a long white tail. The appearance of the comet in the coronograph was unusual, with the coma growing perpendicularly to the apparent motion, and thus indicating a growing dust tail, while on 19 April a series of structures were seen near the head, probably streamers or striae. If these were streamers, they indicated an uprise in activity every 0.5 day. The orbital ephemeris based on the SOHO observations indicated that the comet on 20 April had a magnitude of 2.5.

The comet was spotted in bright twilight on 22 April, when the comet had an estimated magnitude of about 4 to 4.5. On 25 April, while the comet was estimated to have a same magnitude, its tail was estimated to 8.5 degrees long with naked eye, while on 27 April the tail length was estimated to be 10 degrees with 7×35 binoculars, while the comet was estimated to have a magnitude of 5. On 30 April the apparent magnitude was estimated to be 5.8 while the tail was estimated to be 3.5 degrees long.

On 2–3 May, Earth crossed the orbital plane of the comet. As a result, a sunward spike (or anti-tail) and a ray-shaped structure in the dust tail.
