= Ostasio II da Polenta =

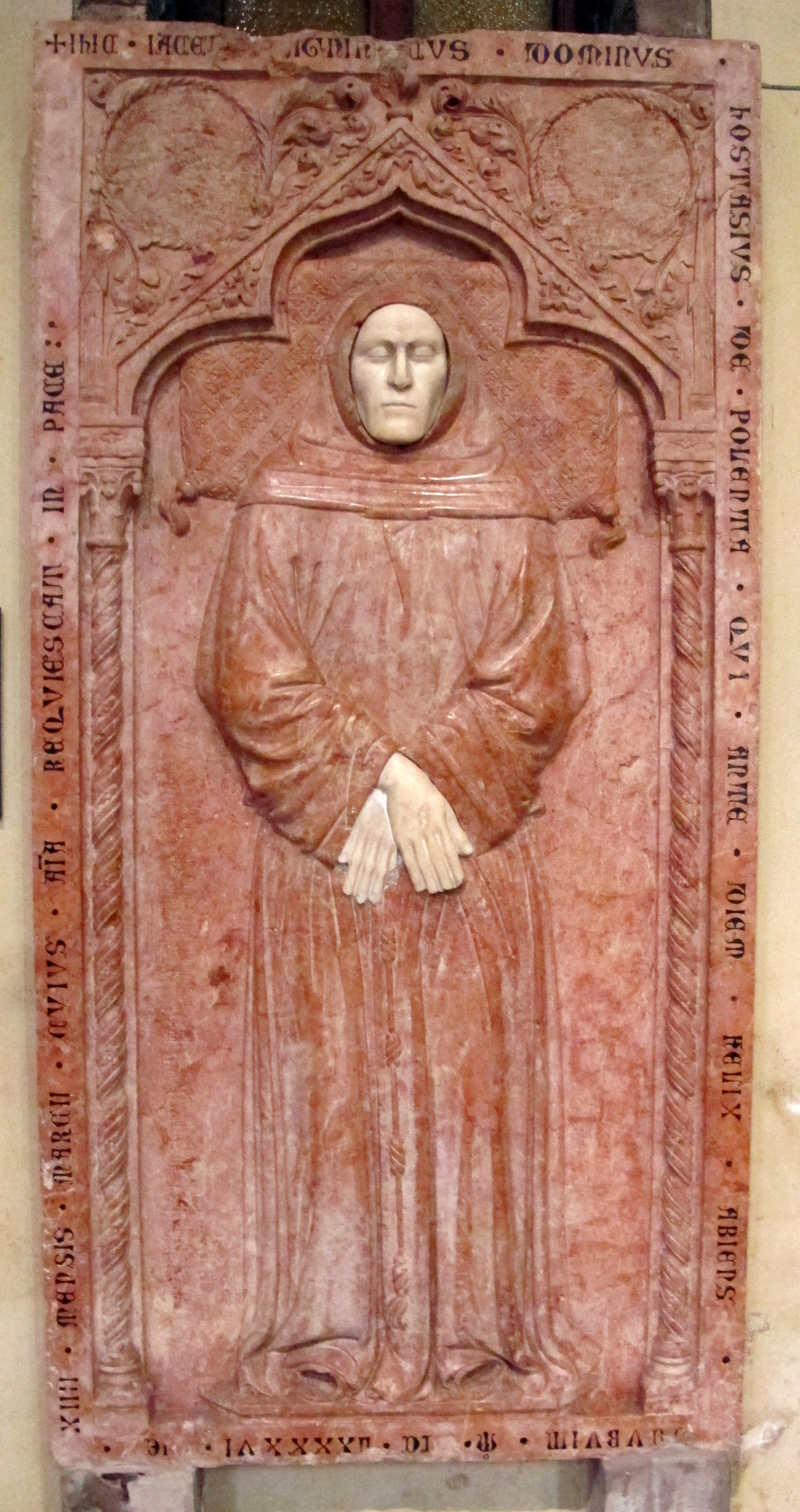
Ravenna, s. Francesco, int., Lapide di ostasio da polenta (1396) in marmo Rosso di Verona image

Ostasio II da Polenta (died 1396) was an Italian condottiero and lord of Ravenna.

== Biography ==
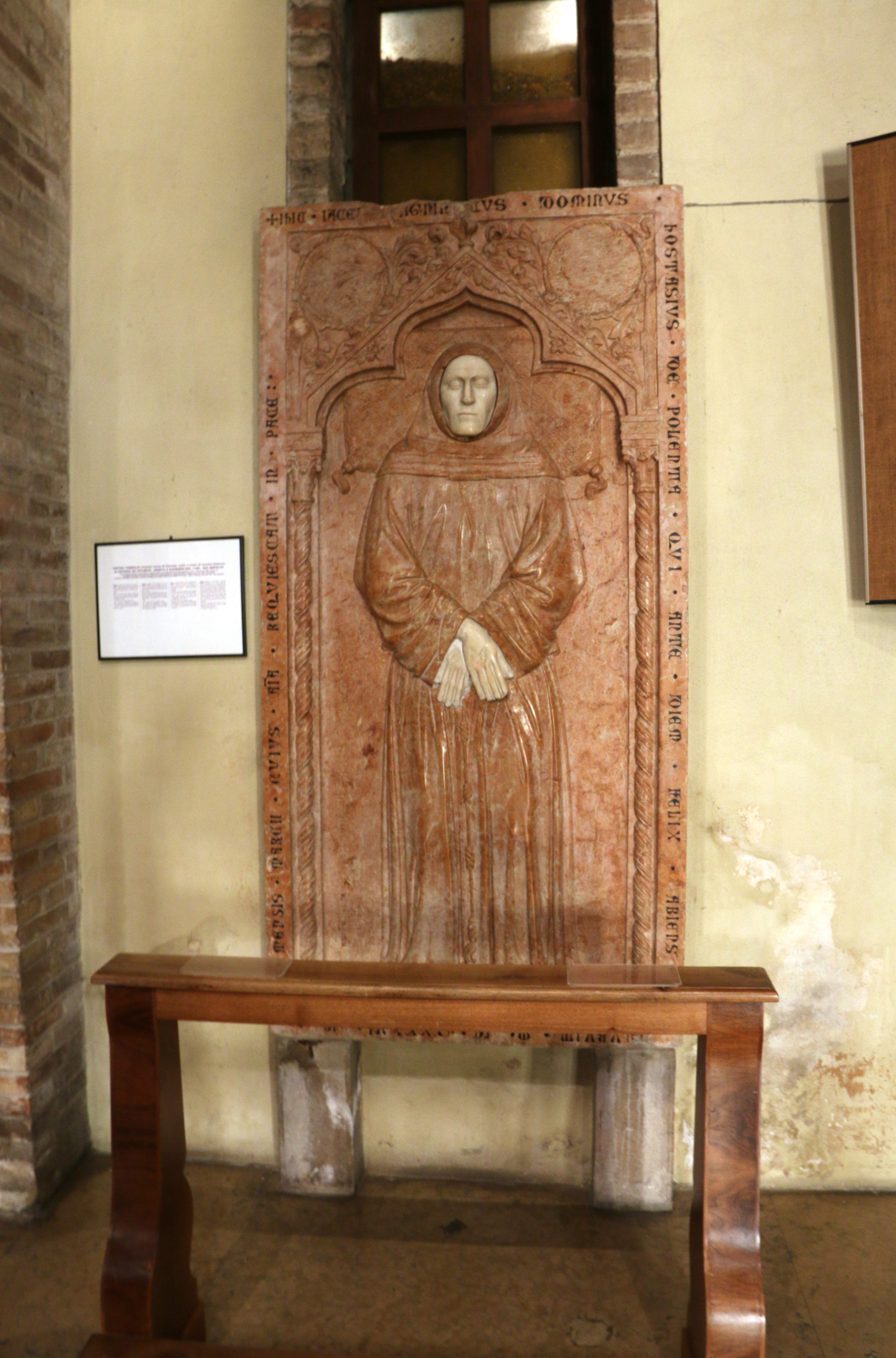
Ravenna, S. Francesco, gravestone for Ostasio II da Polenta in San Francesco, Ravenna (1396) 1 - Photo by Giovanni Dall'Orto, November 29 2015

Ostasio was the son of Guido III da Polenta, lord of Ravenna.

He served under the Angevines in 1382. Four years later, he fought at the orders of his brother-in-law, Antonio della Scala, lord of Verona, against Francesco da Carrara of Padua. In 1387, he led a corps of 1,500 knights and, along with Giovanni Ordelaffi, he faced the White Company led by John Hawkwood, who had been hired by the Paduans. He was defeated at the Battle of Castagnaro by Hawkwood.

In 1389 (the year in which he had his father imprisoned), he was made papal vicar of Ravenna, a position he held until his death in 1396, reigning together with Obizzo da Polenta and his other brothers.

== See also ==
- Da Polenta family

== Sources ==
- Ricotti, E. (1929). Storia delle compagnie di ventura in Italia. Athena.

Preceded by Guido III	Lord of Ravenna; Together with Obizzo da Polenta and other brothers 1389–1396	Succeeded by Obizzo da Polenta and other brothers
