= 3430 Bradfield =

Agnia asteroid

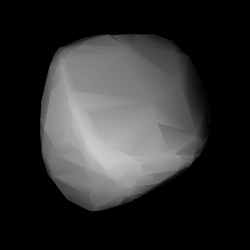
- Shape model of Bradfield from its lightcurve

Discovery
- Discovered by: C. Shoemaker
- Discovery site: Palomar Obs.
- Discovery date: 9 October 1980

Designations
- Named after: William A. Bradfield (discoverer of comets)
- Alternative designations: 1980 TF_{4} · 1974 HY_{1} 1976 YS_{7}
- Minor planet category: main-belt · (middle); Agnia

Orbital characteristics
- Epoch 23 March 2018 (JD 2458200.5)
- Uncertainty parameter 0
- Observation arc: 43.93 yr (16,044 d)
- Aphelion: 3.0293 AU
- Perihelion: 2.4890 AU
- Semi-major axis: 2.7592 AU
- Eccentricity: 0.0979
- Orbital period (sidereal): 4.58 yr (1,674 d)
- Mean anomaly: 102.11°
- Mean motion: 0° 12^{m} 54^{s} / day
- Inclination: 4.4281°
- Longitude of ascending node: 43.225°
- Argument of perihelion: 278.60°

Physical characteristics
- Mean diameter: 8.492±0.263 km
- Geometric albedo: 0.269±0.035
- Spectral type: SMASS = Sq
- Absolute magnitude (H): 12.5

3430 Bradfield (prov. designation: 1980 TF_{4}) is a stony Agnia asteroid from the central regions of the asteroid belt, approximately 8 kilometers (5 miles) in diameter. It was discovered on 9 October 1980, by American astronomer Carolyn Shoemaker at the Palomar Observatory in California. The Sq-type asteroid was named after comet hunter William A. Bradfield.

== Orbit and classification ==
When applying the hierarchical clustering method to its proper orbital elements according to Nesvorný, Bradfield is a member of the Agnia family (514), a very large family of stony asteroids with more than 2000 known members. They most likely formed from the breakup of a basalt object, which in turn was spawned from a larger parent body that underwent igneous differentiation. The family's parent body and namesake is the asteroid 847 Agnia. In the 1995-HCM analysis by Zappalà, however, it is a member of the Liberatrix family (also described as Nemesis family by Nesvorný).

It orbits the Sun in the central main-belt at a distance of 2.5–3.0 AU once every 4 years and 7 months (1,674 days; semi-major axis of 2.76 AU). Its orbit has an eccentricity of 0.10 and an inclination of 4° with respect to the ecliptic. The body's observation arc begins with its observations as 1974 HY_{1} at Cerro El Roble Observatory in April 1974, more than 6 years prior to its official discovery observation at Palomar.

== Naming ==
This minor planet was named after New Zealand-born Australian amateur astronomer and rocket engineer William A. Bradfield (1927–2014). A discoverer of several comets himself, he significantly increased the rate of discovery of bright comets from the southern hemisphere during the 1970s and 1980s. The official naming citation was published by the Minor Planet Center on 14 April 1987 (M.P.C. 11750).

== Physical characteristics ==
In the SMASS classification, Bradfield is an Sq-subtype, that transitions between the common, stony S-type and Q-type asteroids.

=== Diameter and albedo ===
According to the survey carried out by the NEOWISE mission of NASA's Wide-field Infrared Survey Explorer, Bradfield measures 8.492 kilometers in diameter and its surface has an albedo of 0.269.

=== Rotation period ===
As of 2018, no rotational lightcurve of Bradfield has been obtained from photometric observations. The body's rotation period, pole and shape remain unknown.
