= Lawrence of St Martin =

13th-century Bishop of Rochester

- Bishop of Rochester
- Elected: 19 October 1250
- Installed: after 24 October 1251
- Term ended: 3 June 1274
- Predecessor: Richard Wendene
- Successor: Walter de Merton
- Other post: Archdeacon of Coventry

Orders
- Consecration: 9 April 1251

Personal details
- Died: 3 June 1274
- Denomination: Catholic

Lawrence of St Martin (or Laurence de Sancto Martino) was a medieval Bishop of Rochester.

Lawrence was a royal clerk and held prebends in the dioceses of Chichester and Salisbury. He was also archdeacon of the diocese of Coventry.

Lawrence was elected on 19 October 1250 and consecrated on 9 April 1251. He was enthroned at Rochester Cathedral after 24 October 1251.

Lawrence died on 3 June 1274.

== Citations ==
Catholic Church titles
Preceded by Richard Wendene	Bishop of Rochester; 1250–1274	Succeeded by Walter de Merton
