= John Bradfield (biologist) =

British biologist and entrepreneur

John Richard Grenfell Bradfield
- Born: 20 May 1925; Cambridge, England, UK
- Died: 13 October 2014 (aged 89); Cambridge, England, UK
- Education: Trinity College, Cambridge
- Known for: Biologist; Entrepreneur; Cambridge Science Park
- Awards: Knighthood in the New Year honours
- Scientific career
- Workplaces: Trinity College, Cambridge
- Website: http://www.trin.cam.ac.uk/past-fellows

Sir John Richard Grenfell Bradfield, CBE (20 May 1925 – 13 October 2014) was a British biologist and entrepreneur, most famous for his role as the founder of Cambridge Science Park, the first Science Park in Europe.

== Education ==
Sir John was a former pupil of the Cambridge and County High School for Boys — now Hills Road Sixth Form College — where he won a scholarship in 1942 to study natural sciences at Trinity College, Cambridge. He graduated from Cambridge with MA and PhD degrees, and was initially a Research Fellow in cell biology before being made a Fellow of Trinity in 1947, a position he maintained until his death in 2014.

== Cambridge Science Park and career ==
Bradfield was Senior Bursar of Trinity College from 1956 to 1992. He spearheaded the creation of Cambridge's research and business campus in the early 1970s, and was its director for many years. In 1970, Trinity, under Bradfield's guidance, founded Cambridge Science Park on the outskirts of the city. He was manager of Cambridge Science Park until his retirement in 1992.

Bradfield was Chairman of Addenbrooke's NHS Trust from 1993 to 1997.

== Awards ==
In 1985 he was awarded CBE.

In 1992 Bradfield received an Honorary Degree from Cambridge University.

In 2007 he was awarded a knighthood in the New Year honours list in recognition of his services to science, business and to the community of Cambridge.

== Death ==
Sir John died on 13 October 2014, aged 89, under the Great Gate at Trinity College on his way to attend a dinner for the current tenants of Cambridge Science Park.
