= Lamberto II da Polenta =

Past Italian lord

Lamberto II da Polenta (died 1347) was briefly jointly lord of Ravenna and Cervia from 1346 until his death.

He was the son of Ostasio I da Polenta. In 1346 he inherited the family lordships together with his brothers Bernardino I and Pandolfo. Bernardino, however, had both Pandolfo and Lamberto imprisoned in Cervia after one year, where they died of starvation.

== See also ==
- Da Polenta

Preceded by Guido II	Lord of Ravenna; 1346–1347; Together with Bernardino I and Pandolfo	Succeeded by Bernardino I
