= John Bradfield (bishop) =

13th-century Bishop of Rochester

- Bishop of Rochester
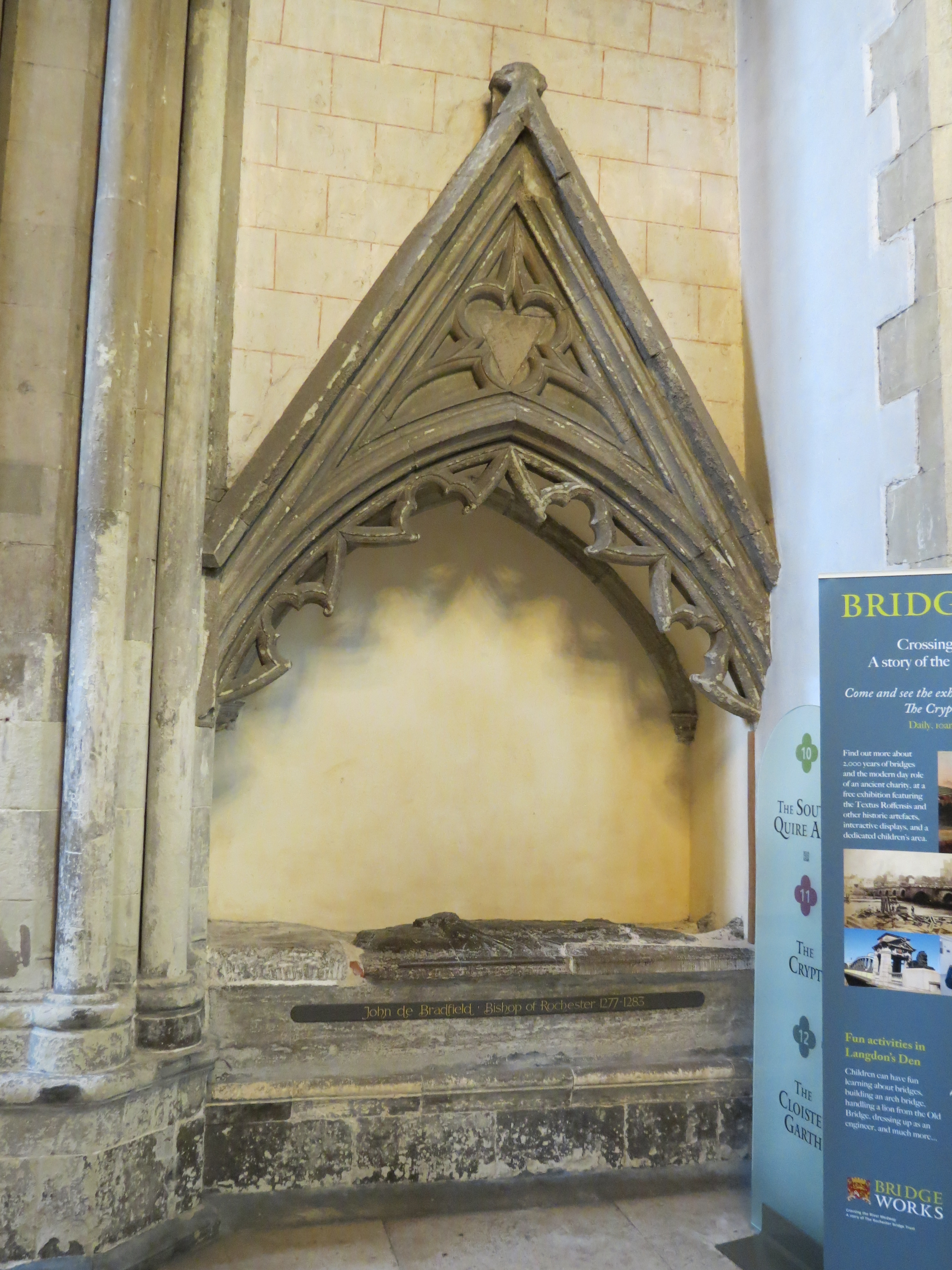
- Elected: 1278
- Term ended: 23 April 1283
- Predecessor: Walter de Merton
- Successor: John Kirkby
- Other post: Precentor of Rochester

Orders
- Consecration: 29 May 1278

Personal details
- Died: 23 April 1283
- Denomination: Catholic

John Bradfield (or John de Bradfield) was a medieval Bishop of Rochester.

Bradfield is believed to have come from Bradfield in Berkshire. He was a monk of Rochester Cathedral and precentor of Rochester before he was elected to the see of Rochester in 1278. He was consecrated on 29 May 1278. He died on 23 April 1283.

== Citations ==
Catholic Church titles
Preceded by Walter de Merton	Bishop of Rochester; 1278–1283	Succeeded by John Kirkby
