= William A. Bradfield =

Australian amateur astronomer (1927–2014)

Bill Bradfield
- Born: 20 June 1927; Levin, New Zealand
- Died: 9 June 2014 (aged 86)
- Citizenship: Australian
- Education: University of New Zealand
- Known for: discovering a record 18 comets
- Spouse: Eileen
- Children: Katherine, Caroline, and Jennifer
- Awards: Member of the Order of Australia, Edgar Wilson Award
- Scientific career
- Fields: Astronomy

William Ashley Bradfield AM (20 June 1927 – 9 June 2014) was a New Zealand-born Australian amateur astronomer, notable as a prolific amateur discoverer of comets. He discovered 18 comets, all of which bear his name as the sole discoverer.

His astronomical achievements were summed up by Brian G. Marsden, director emeritus of the IAU's Central Bureau for Astronomical Telegrams: "To discover 18 comets visually is an extraordinary accomplishment in any era, but to do so now is truly remarkable, and I think we can be pretty sure nobody will be able to do it again. And it's all the more astounding that in no case did he have to share a discovery with some other independent discoverer. More than any other recipient, Bill Bradfield outstandingly deserves the Edgar Wilson Award."

== Biography ==
Bradfield was born in Levin, New Zealand on 20 June 1927. He grew up on a dairy farm, where his interests in rocketry and astronomy first developed, and when he was 15 he got his first small telescope. He attended the University of New Zealand, where he graduated with a bachelor's degree in Mechanical Engineering. He spent 2 years in England doing a rocket propulsion residency and then in 1953 he moved to Australia, taking up residence in Adelaide, where he worked for the Australian Department of Defence as a rocket propulsion engineer and research scientist until he retired in 1986. This was also where he met Eileen; they were married in 1957, and they went on to have three daughters.

Bradfield joined the Astronomical Society of South Australia (ASSA) in 1970 which fueled his interest, and he started hunting for comets in 1971, using a second-hand telescope which he bought from another ASSA member.

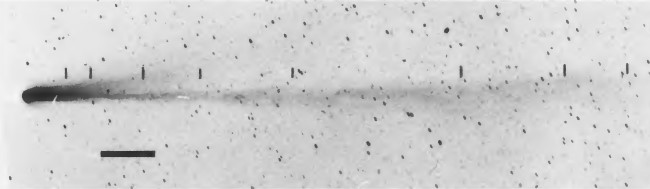
Comet C/1974 C1 (Bradfield) on 23 March 1974

Just over a year and 260 hours of searching later, he was rewarded with finding Comet Bradfield (C/1972 E1). Six comets followed in his first six years, and in 1987 the discovery of his 13th comet made him the most prolific comet-hunter of the 20th century. Eventually his count built to 18 comets after 3500 hours of searching, with the 18th and final comet discovery coming on 23 March 2004 when he was 76 years old.

When Bradfield discovered a comet and communicated it to the International Astronomical Union (IAU), it kicked off worldwide action. Within 14 hours of reporting his 17th comet in 1995, it had been observed by more than 20 observers, including the European Southern Observatory (ESO) 1-meter Schmidt telescope at La Silla, Chile.

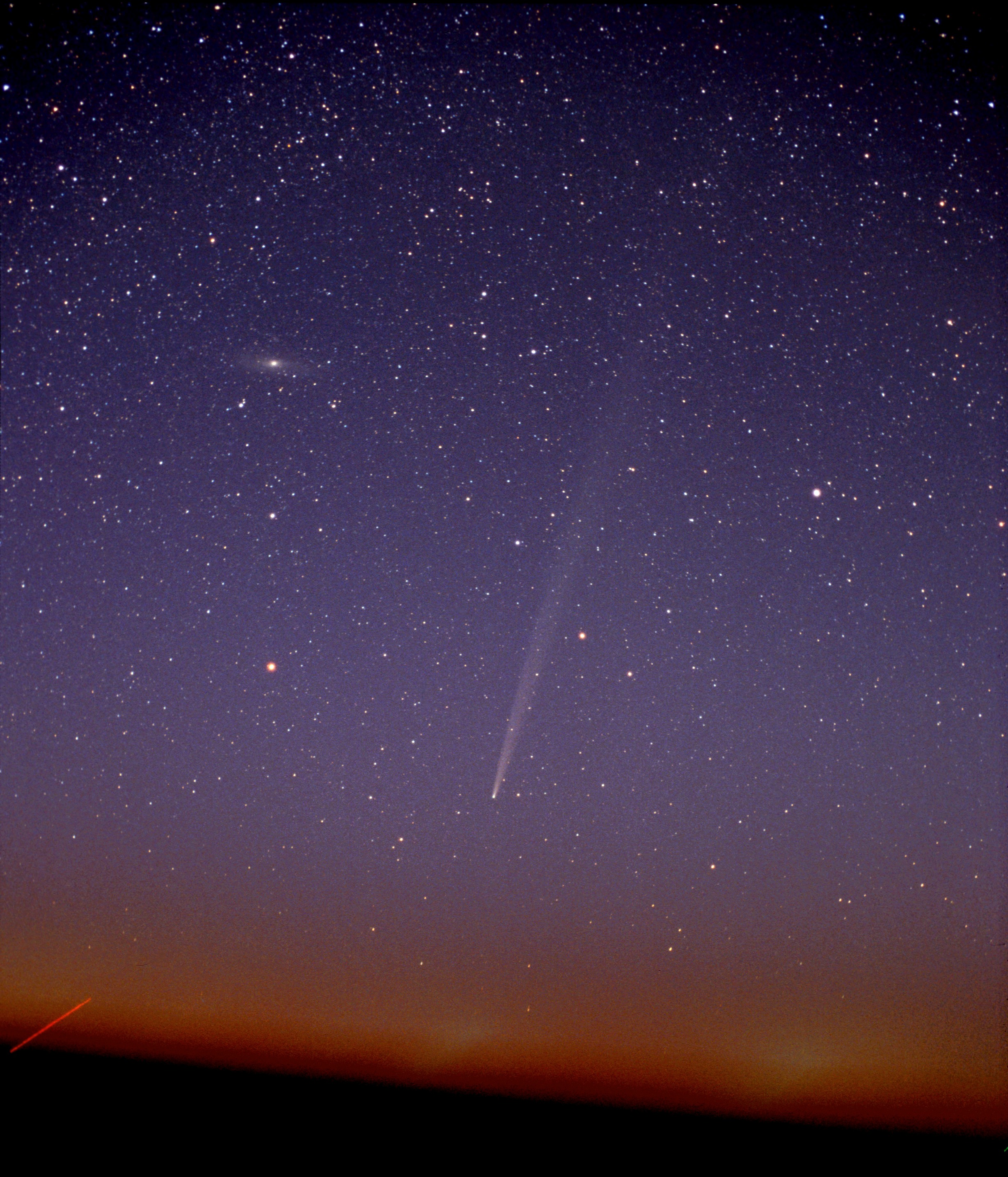
Comet C/2004 F4 (Bradfield) from Cactus Flats in NE Colorado, US.

His discoveries were particularly notable because he worked alone to discover them, using old and home-made telescopic equipment. Apart from the 100-year-old lens and modern eyepieces, the remainder of his telescope was homemade, but perfectly suited for hunting comets. He did not use photographic or computerized detection equipment, relying instead on purely visual sweeping across the skies.

Having joined the Astronomical Society of South Australia (ASSA) in 1970, Bradfield served as its president from 1977 to 1979. In 1989 he was appointed an honorary Life Member, and he was inducted into the ASSA Hall of Fame in 2013.

He died on 9 June 2014 after a long illness, at age 86.

== Awards and honors ==
- Asteroid 3430 Bradfield was named in his honour.
- Bradfield received the Berenice and Arthur Page Medal from the Astronomical Society of Australia in 1981.
- He was made a member of the Order of Australia (AM) "in recognition of his service to astronomy" in 1989.
- He was made an Honorary Life Member of the Astronomical Society of South Australia in 1989.
- In 2000 the Astronomical Society of South Australia created the Bill Bradfield Astronomy Award in honour of his achievements, given to an amateur who displays exceeding accomplishment in a given year in the field of astronomy.
- He was awarded the Edgar Wilson Award from the Smithsonian Astrophysical Observatory (SAO) through the IAU's Central Bureau for Astronomical Telegrams (CBAT) in 2004.
- In 2013 he was inducted into the ASSA Hall of Fame.

== List of discovered comets ==
Number	Comet	Hours	Date	Mag
1	C/1972 E1	260	Mar 12.81	10
2	C/1974 C1	306	Feb 12.49	9
3	C/1975 E1	145	Mar 12.45	9
4	C/1975 V2	106	Nov 11.74	10
5	C/1976 D1	57	Feb 19.49	9
6	C/1976 E1	9	Mar 3.778	9
7	C/1978 C1	360	Feb 4.755	8
8	C/1978 T3	75	Oct 10.785	9
9	C/1979 M1	98	Jun 24.417	10
10	C/1979 Y1	67	Dec 24.753	5
11	C/1980 Y1	113	Dec 17.751	6
12	P/1984 A1	384	Jan 7.733	11
13	C/1987 P1	307	Aug 11.437	10
14	C/1989 A3	164	Jan 6.514	12
15	C/1992 B1	129	Jan 31.736	10
16	C/1992 J2	30	May 3.806	10
17	C/1995 Q1	289	Aug 17.410	6
18	C/2004 F4		Mar 23.43	8

Comet: Initial designation of the comet
Hours: Number of search hours for discovery
Date: Discovery date in UT
Mag: Total magnitude (brightness) of comet at discovery
