= Guido I da Polenta =

Lord of Ravenna from 1275 to 1297

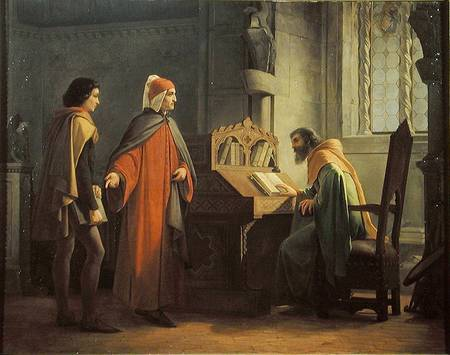
Dante Alighieri presenting Giotto to Guido da Polenta, painting by Giovanni Mochi (19th century), Galleria d'Arte Moderna, Florence

Guido I da Polenta (died 1310) was lord of Ravenna from 1275 until his abdication in 1297.

The son of Lamberto da Polenta, he was ousted from Ravenna by the imperial troops in 1240. When the city was returned to the Papal States in 1248, Guido was able to return and was made chief of the local council. In 1270, after the death of Bishop Felix, he divided the power in the city and that of Comacchio with Guido Riccio da Polenta, in collaboration with the other major Ravennate family, the Traversari.

However, Guido and Guido Riccio soon were at war, and Guido allied with the Malatesta of Rimini in order also to counter Guido I da Montefeltro who had conquered Forlì and Cervia. Through this alliance Guido was able to gain the complete seigniory of Ravenna. The marriage of his daughter Francesca with Giovanni Malatesta caused a revolt in the city, whose outcome was the expulsion of the Traversari.

In 1282 he took part to the offensive of the Pope against Guido da Montefeltro, and was able to gain Cervia in the fray. In 1290 he was elected podestà of Florence. In 1293 Guido Riccio died, and Guido added Comacchio to the family's territories.

At his abdication in 1297 he was succeeded by his sons Lamberto and Bernardino.

Guido's grandson, Guido Novello, was the host of Dante Alighieri in Ravenna.

== See also ==
- Da Polenta

Preceded by To the Papal States	Lord of Ravenna; 1275–1297	Succeeded by Lamberto
Preceded by Guido I da Montefeltro	Lord of Cervia; 1282–1297	Succeeded by Bernardino da Polenta
