= Da Polenta family =

Noble Italian family

Coat of arms of da Polenta family.

The da Polenta family (Italian: [da (p)poˈlɛnta]) or Polentani (Italian: [polenˈtaːni]) was an old Italian noble family whose name derives from the Castle of Polenta near Bertinoro in Romagna.

== History ==
The founder of the house is said to have been Guido, surnamed "l'Antico" (the Elder), who wielded great authority in Ravenna in the 13th century. His grandson Guido Novello upheld the power of the house and was also capitano del popolo at Bologna; he was overthrown in 1322. His chief claim to renown lies in the fact that in 1321 he gave hospitality to the poet Dante, who immortalized the tragic history of Guido the Elder's daughter Francesca da Rimini, unhappily married to Giovanni Malatesta, lord of Rimini, in an episode of L'Inferno.

Guido's kinsman Ostasio I was lord of Cervia and Ravenna from 1322 to 1329. After being recognized as a vassal of the Holy See, he again became independent and went over to the House of Este, whom he served faithfully in their struggles with the Church until his death in 1346. His son Bernardino, who succeeded him as lord of Ravenna in 1346, was deposed in 1347 by his brothers, Pandolfo and Lamberto II, but was reinstated a few months later and ruled until his death in 1359; he was famous for his profligacy and cruelty.

His son Guido III ruled more mildly and died in 1390. Then followed Ostasio II (died 1396), Bernardino (died 1400), Obizzo (died 1431), Pietro (died 1404), Aldobrandino (d. 1406), all sons of Guido III. Ostasio III (or V), son of Obizzo, was at first allied with the Venetians; later he went over to the Milanese, and, although he again joined the Venetians, the latter never forgave his intrigue with their enemies, and in 1441 they deprived him of his dominions. He died in a monastery in 1447.
