= Dernancourt, South Australia =

Dernancourt
- Suburb
- Coordinates: 34°51′40″S 138°40′59″E
- Country: Australia
- State: South Australia
- City: Adelaide
- LGAs: City of Port Adelaide Enfield; City of Tea Tree Gully

Government
  - State electorate: South Australia
  - Federal division: Australia

Population
  - Total: 4,063 (SAL 2021)
- Postcode: 5075

Dernancourt is a north-eastern suburb of Adelaide, located in both Tea Tree Gully and Port Adelaide Enfield council areas. It is approximately 10 kilometres from the Adelaide Central Business District.

== Origins ==
"Dernancourt" is named after the Battle of Dernancourt which took place on 28 March 1918 during World War I. According to historical records, South Australian soldiers, including many from the Tea Tree Gully area, played a crucial part in the defence of Allied positions, with approximately 1230 Australians losing their lives in the battle. According to the City of Tea Tree Gully, the suburb was created by Richard Arthur Hobby on land owned by him, and he named the suburb in recognition of the Battle of Dernancourt and the soldiers' ultimate sacrifice.

== Facilities ==
Education is provided by Dernancourt Primary School and Dernancourt Junior Primary School, located on Parsons Road.

The Catholic Church in the suburb is dedicated to St Pius X.
