= Guido II da Polenta =

Italian lord of Ravenna (died 1333)

Guido II da Polenta (died 1333), also known as Guido Novello, was an Italian who served as lord of Ravenna from 1316 until 1322.

The nephew of Lamberto I da Polenta, he acquired the lordship of the city after his uncle's death. In 1316–1321 he was host of Dante Alighieri. In 1322 he was named capitano del popolo of Bologna and left the government of Ravenna to his brother Rinaldo, who was archbishop of the city though without the Papal confirmation. Ostasio I da Polenta, from the family line of Cervia, profited of the situation to kill Rinaldo and seize the power for himself.

Guido Novello died in 1333 after trying in vain to reconquer Ravenna.

== See also ==
- Da Polenta

Preceded by Lamberto I	Lord of Ravenna; 1316–1322	Succeeded by Ostasio I
