= Isotta =

Isotta may refer to:

- the Italian form of the name Iseult
- Isotta degli Atti (died 1474), an Italian regent
- Isotta Brembati (died 1586), Italian poet and countess
- Isotta Fraschini, Italian luxury car manufacturer
- Isotta Gervasi (1889–1967), Italian medical doctor
- Isotta Nogarola (1418–1466), Italian writer and humanist
- Isotta Ingrid Rossellini (born 1952), Italian writer and academic
- Isotta Brothers (19th century), Italian hoteliers
- Paolo Isotta (1950–2021), Italian musicologist
