= Girometti =

Girometti is an Italian surname. Notable people with the surname include:

- Roberto Girometti (born 1939), Italian film director and cinematographer
- William Girometti (1924–1998), Italian painter
