= Nicoletta Pasquale =

Italian poet

Nicoletta Pasquale, known also as Coletta Pasquale or Paschale (Latin: Nicoletta Paschalis) (fl. 1540) was an Italian poet.

== Biography ==
Nicoletta Pasquale was a noblewoman of Messina, (Note: According to Benedetto Croce, she belonged to the Sicilian family Pasquale, of Spanish origin. Also belonging to this family, again according to Croce, was the Messinese poet Giulio Cesare Pascali (or Pasquale) (1527–1601), who converted to Calvinism and was exiled to Geneva in the second half of the 16th century.) a poet and intellectual. Little is known about her education and private life. She was mentioned by the historian Antonio Mongitore in his biographical work Bibliotheca Sicula, which in turn was used as a source for the work L'istoria della volgar poesia (History of vernacular poetry) by the literary critic Giovanni Mario Crescimbeni, first published in 1698.

== Works ==
Nicoletta Pasquale left a legacy of several sonnets and a sestina. Some of her poetic contributions were published in Il sesto libro delle rime di diversi eccellenti autori and in Il Tempio alla divina signora donna Giovanna d'Aragona, both anthologies collected and edited by Girolamo Ruscelli and published in Venice in 1553 and 1555, respectively.

== See also ==
- Devorà Ascarelli, first published Jewish female author
- Laura Battiferri
- Isotta Brembati
- Maddalena Campiglia
- Veronica Franco
- Isabella di Morra
