= William Girometti =

Italian painter (1924–1998)

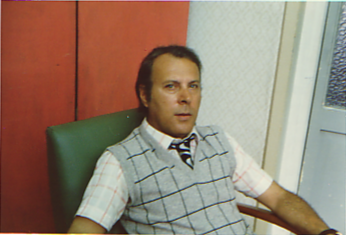
- William Girometti in 1976
- Born: January 9, 1924; Milan
- Died: October 3, 1998 (aged 74); Bologna
- Resting place: Bologna
- Education: Accademia di Brera
- Known for: Painting, Drawing, Sculpture
- Awards: His painting Disamina della verità obiettiva was recommended by UNICEF in 1979 for the International Year of the Child

William Girometti (Milan, 9 January 1924 – Bologna, 3 October 1998) was an Italian painter of Surrealist influence.

== Biography ==
William Girometti was born in Milan and spent his childhood and early years there, becoming involved with the Accademia di Brera in the period of the Second World War. At the end of the war, he began traveling and living in other Italian cities; in Ferrara, in 1954, he met the woman who would some years later become his wife.

In Ferrara, and in particular Pontelagoscuro, in the early 1950s, he came into contact with a group of young painters (including Tito Salomoni) with whom he would establish a strong friendship and who would encourage him in making painting his career.

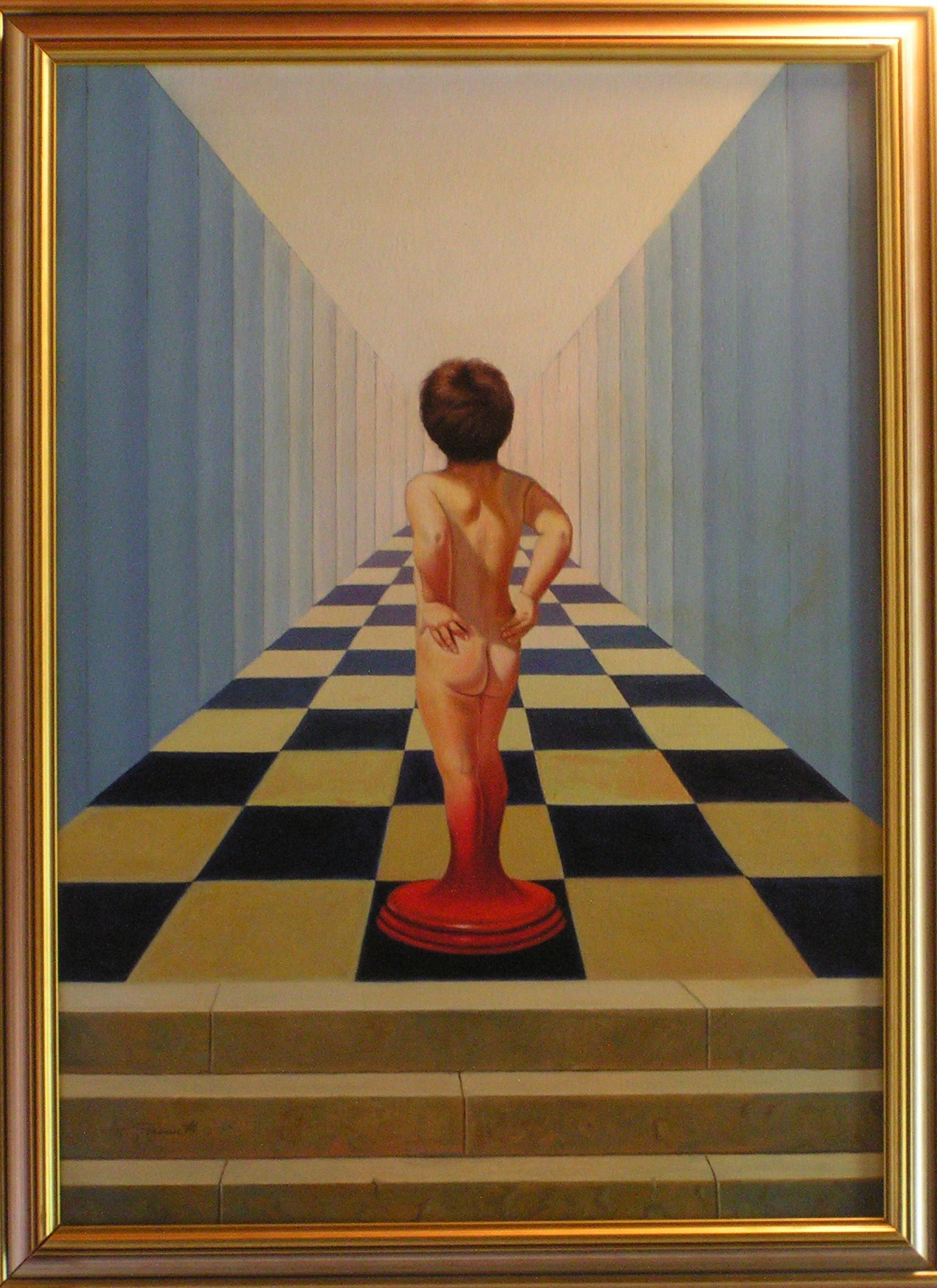
Disamina della verità obiettiva (Close examination of unbiased truth), 1979. This painting was recommended by UNICEF in 1979 for the International Year of the Child and published on the cover of the January issue of the journal Simpatia e Amicizia in the same year.

Initially, in fact, he had devoted himself to sculpture, which was not completely abandoned until the end of the 1960s, as a review from 1968 demonstrates; in it, the art critic Fiorani expresses his esteem for the «sure command of expressive means», the «incisiveness of the faces», the «harmonious rhythm» and the «perfect balance between form, light and space».

Towards the end of the 1950s he spent a period of time studying and working in France, Switzerland, Austria, Germany, Denmark and Sweden before returning to Italy to divide his time between Milan and Ferrara. In particular, he exhibited his works numerous times in Milan in shows of the Permanente.

In the 1960s he began his production, destined to become copious, of portraits and trompe-l'œil works, most of which were commissioned by private collectors and art dealers; finally settling in Bologna with his wife, he started in 1971 to lay the foundations for his Surrealist works despite continuing to produce more traditional works on request. In painting his father-in-law, whom he had never met because of his premature death, Girometti referred to the photo on a medallion of only a few centimeters in size.

In 1973, with a show inaugurated on 24 November at "Il Collezionista" art gallery in Bologna, he began to present works of a Surrealistic-Metaphysical genre in a series of exhibitions, both personal and collective, in Italy and abroad, which earned him prizes, recognition and reviews in newspapers, magazines, specialized catalogues and on Italian and European radio and television programs.

His first Surrealist works were inspired by the reality surrounding him, and were centered around themes of philosophy and ecology or dedicated to musicians and literary figures. Even his portraits acquired a surreal character.

The critics generally agreed in recognizing his «compositional elegance», «chromatic sensitivity», «impeccable technique» and «command of form», together with the emphasis on content expressed through the «interesting fusion of irony and polemic» that only seemingly results in pessimism.

A few reviews underline both the effective elaboration of the teachings of André Breton and the reference to René Magritte, with whom in particular he shared «a singularity of images» and «visual tricks» also achieved through the use of trompe-l'oeil.

If, as a sculptor, he had favored the use of clay, as a painter he created mostly paintings in oil on canvas or wood, along with some pastels and the occasional tempera. Towards the end of the 1970s he invented his own graphics technique, a technique he never divulged.

He also wrote verse, and in the dépliant of the exhibit at "Il Collezionista" one of his poems was published.

In his last years he devoted himself to the study of glass and experimented with new aesthetic realizations of constant themes; at his death in 1998 a Surrealistic Neptune and two other works were left unfinished. A few months before dying he was gratified by a retrospective dedicated entirely to him, organized by the University and by the Comune of Bologna.

== The Art of Girometti ==
In 1976 the art critic Otello Mario Martinelli introduced a radio interview synthesizing the artistic development of William Girometti: «starting with his early interest in Impressionism, which dates back to 1960, yielding to his natural predisposition for the human body, he has created many portraits – also using sculpture – while his inner evolution is leading him to the painting of reality with compositions and trompe-l'oeil that he expresses with soft lines and harmonious colors. In 1971 he became interested in Surrealism».

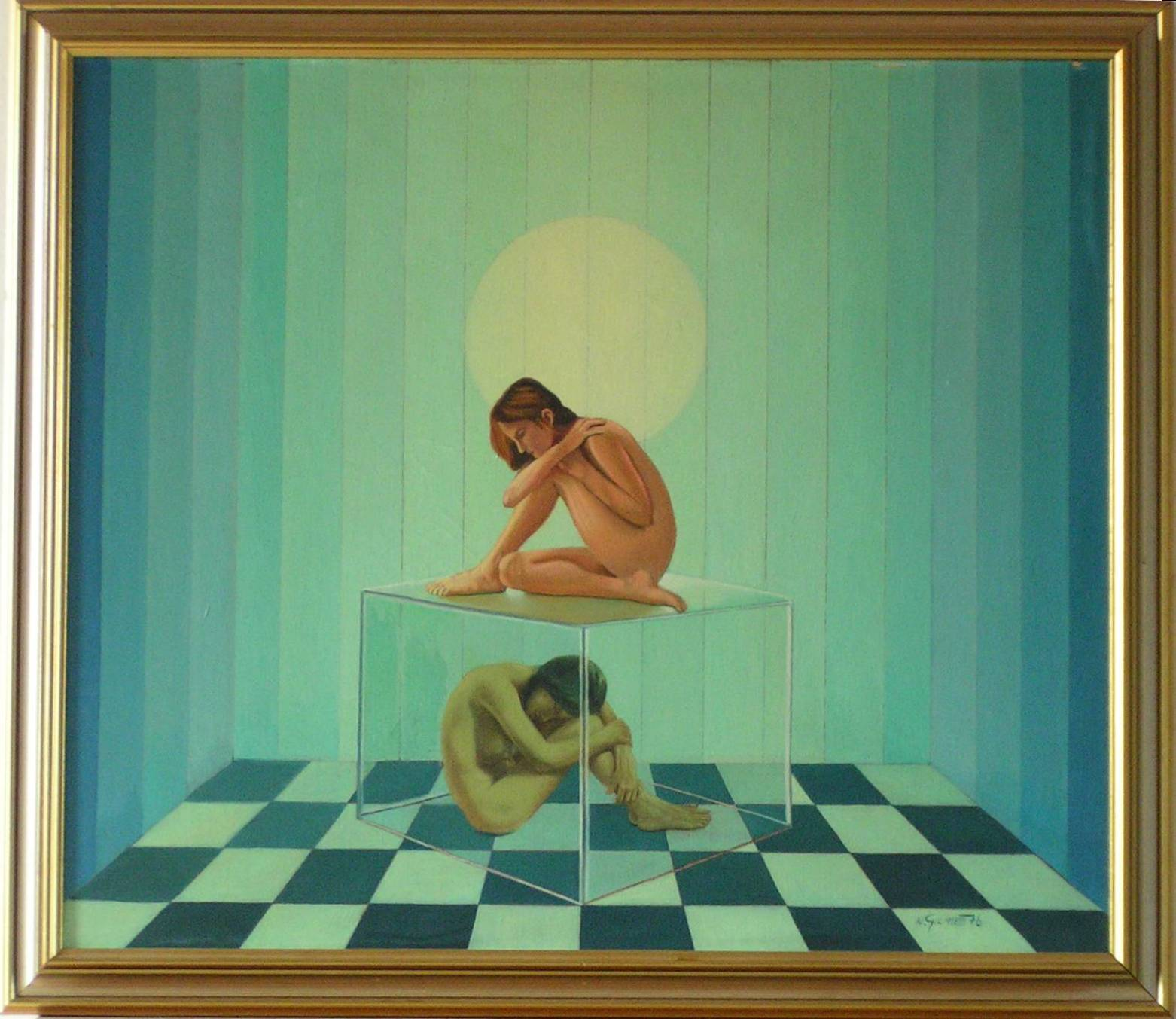
C... come condizionamento (C... for Conditioning), 1976

Concerning Girometti's relationship with Surrealism, more than one critic has noted how the adherence to a pictorial movement did not prevent the artist from expressing himself in an original way, revealing the «contents of his thought» and showing a «unique personality»: «an artist who identified in Surrealism the expressive form most agreeable to him», proving himself to be "«a valid continuator» of a movement born as an «advocate of an essential inner renewal, capable of improving the very nature of a society».

Surrealism was for him «the most congenial language for expressing observations, drives and thoughts»: «a personality and a matter of commitment that support a style, rather than being supported». Girometti essentially brought about the «rehabilitation of Surrealism, not experienced passively but instead felt as a strong stimulus thanks to which the imagination manages to stand up for its rights».

A «vast humanistic culture» «represents the indispensable element for realizing oneself better without ever falling into self-satisfied intellectualism» and provides «classical ideas for new semantic inventions of line»; together with «a clear moral code» it also constitutes the basis for the «incessant work of observation and research»: the «canvases are the result of the conquest of conscience, as the artist himself says», a man who «has tenaciously delved into himself in search of his own means and specific natural inclinations».

According to Gian Mario Olivieri, instead, «the literary allusions in the figurative field, the intellectual correlations and classical quotations, the vivid sensitized colors» connect William Girometti to Magical Realism, together with those artists who work «on an ideal concept» and make «conscious use of their own means to create it».

Many critics have hypothetized about the meaning of some of his works in particular, always underlining their «difficult interpretation» and the «depth of inquiry», and the classification of the themes dealt with in general: from themes of «an existential nature and lyrical inspiration», to «themes of a social and ecological nature».

In graphics «the inspiring theme of childhood above all, and of the woman considered as a human subject, is interlaced with metaphors»; underlined on the one hand is the «refinement of certain musical instruments from whose spaces emerge with chaste discretion enigmatic infantile figures», on the other hand, «the motif of the constant presence of the young boy engaged by the artist to symbolize hope in a better future» through «continuous biological and social regeneration».

== Selected works ==
Most of Girometti's paintings are in private collections.

=== 1965–1973 ===
==== Oil paintings ====
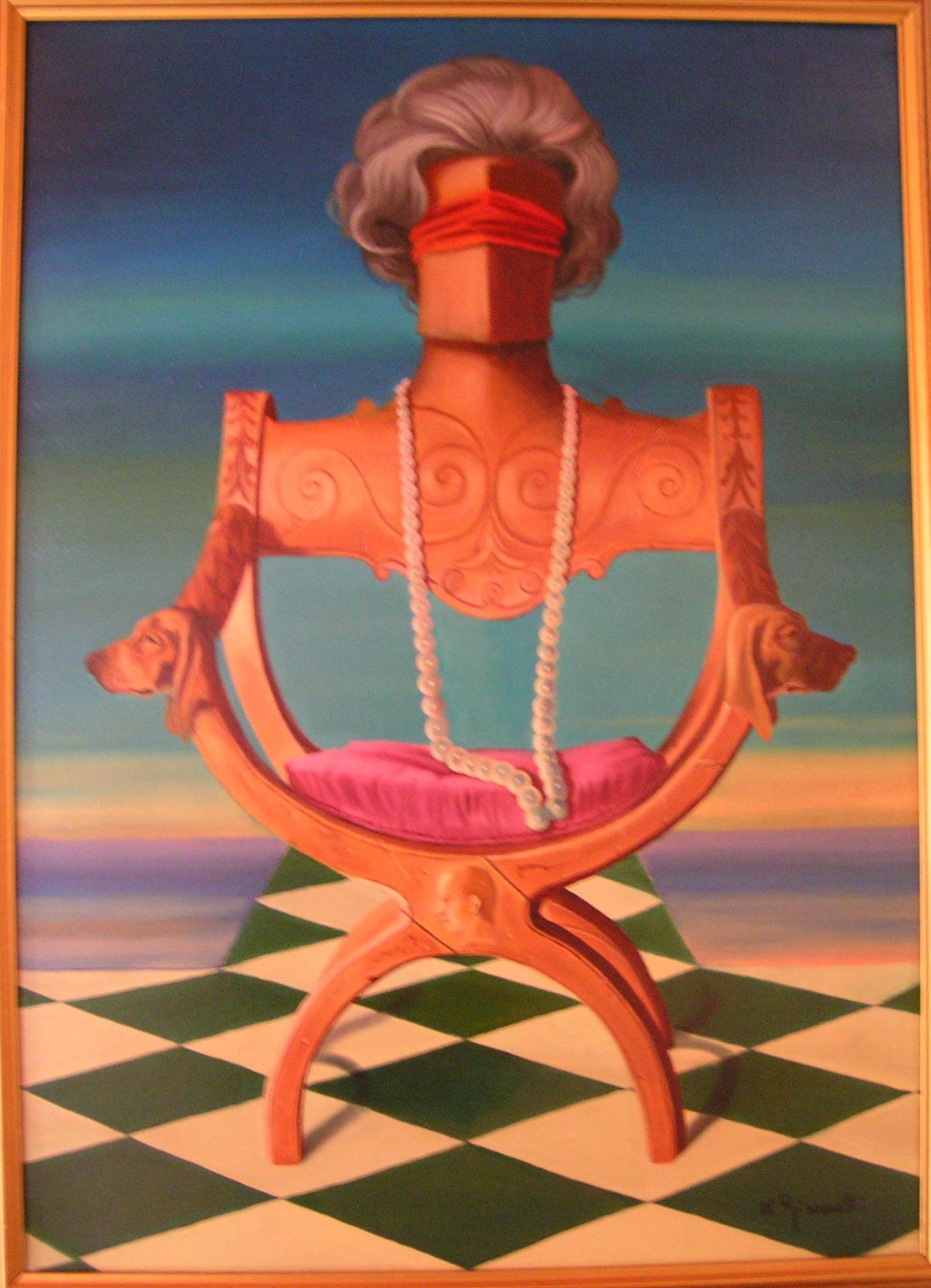
Ritratto di signora ignota (Portrait of an unknown lady), 1972

- Ritratto di Nabore Tosati, portrait of Girometti's father-in-law
- Ritratto di Papa Giovanni XXIII
- La moderna dimensione della donna
- Siamo preparati alla vita in comune?
- Scelta anticonformista
- Partita impegnativa
- Colonna sonora (omaggio a P.I. Tchaikovsky)
- Tempo di stress
- Recondite aspirazioni
- L'attualità di Shakespeare
- Ritratto di signora ignota
- Ritratto della signora Tilde**
- Proteso a nuove conquiste
- Discorso su tema ecologico
- Vagheggiamenti d'un drogato
- Rinuncia forzata
- Bononia goliardica
- Calamità naturale
- Momenti distensivi
- In attesa di giudizio
- La stupidità, un male inguaribile
- Alla ricerca di una platea
- Riepilogando un discorso

=== 1974–1981 ===
==== Oil paintings ====
- Trasformare, significa migliorare?
- Cultura come fatto sociale
- Nello spazio e nel tempo (omaggio a L. V. Beethoven)
- Realtà incombente
- Nuove prospettive per un mondo decadente
- Idee per una tela bianca
- Spettacolo giovane
- Disamina della verità obiettiva
- Restauro come terapia
- Problema non risolto
- C... come condizionamento
- Dialettica illusoria
- Escalation indiscriminata
- L'idolo di tutti i tempi
- Sussurri burleschi, private collection
- Autoritratto
- Ritratto d'un pittore entomologo
- Senza titolo (Without title), 1978
- Ritratto introspettivo di Marco**
- Il fantasioso mondo di Simone
- Squarcio ecologico
- Visto: si nasca (dall'omonimo romanzo di F. Bertelli)
- Esistenza nel riflesso della libertà
- Armonie della natura
- The great symphony
- I sogni nel cassetto
- Improrogabile ricerca di nuovi orizzonti
- Fantasia di note
- Molecole d'amicizia
- Ispirazione sopita
- Artistiche aspirazioni
- Scambio ambivalente
- La faccia nascosta
- Dinamica del potere

==== Graphics ====
- Libertà soffocata
- La proposizione oggettiva
- Enigmatico futuro
- Spontaneità preclusa
- Ritratto della moglie Luciana

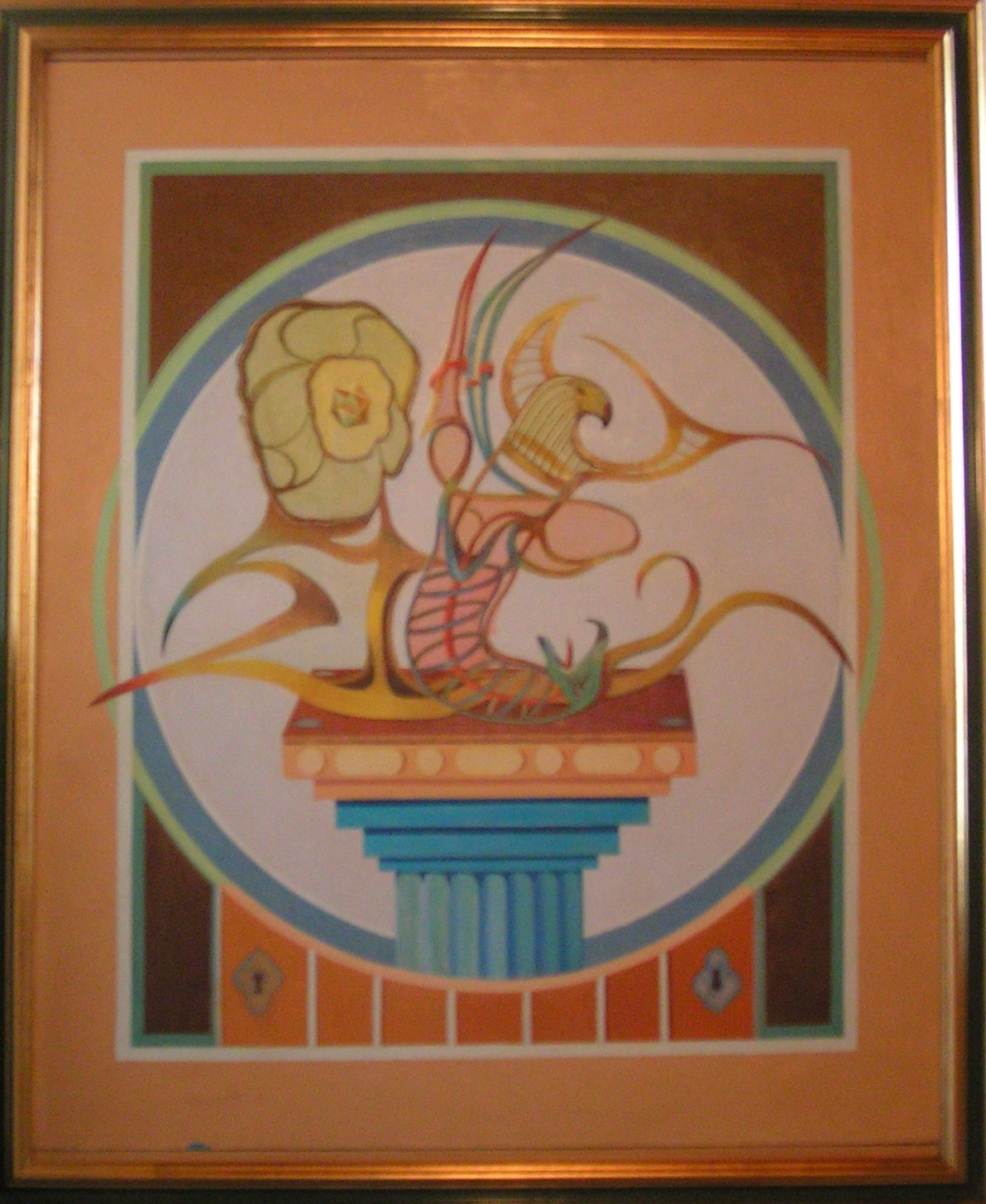
Senza titolo - omaggio a Pier Paolo Pasolini (Untitled work in homage to Pier Paolo Pasolini), 1980

=== 1982–1991 ===
==== Oil paintings ====
- Riflessioni adolescenziali
- The top model
- Il nome della Rosa (dall'omonimo romanzo di U. Eco)
- Omaggio a Thomas Schippers
- Il castello di Mespelbrunn
- Senza titolo (omaggio a Pier Paolo Pasolini)
- Il bonsai
- Fragilità sommersa

== Solo exhibitions ==
- 1973: Bologna, William Girometti, "Il Collezionista" art gallery, 24 November-6 December
- 1974: Florence, William Girometti, "Spinetti" art gallery, 23 November-5 December
- 1975: Modena, William Girometti, "Selezione d'arte e cultura" art gallery, 15–28 February
- 1975: Lerici, William Girometti, "La Cattedrale" art gallery, 1–8 March
- 1975: Carrara, William Girometti, "Carrara" art gallery, 26 April-9 May
- 1976: Munich, Girometti William, Museum Five Continents, Berufsverband Bildender Künstler, 30 January-29 February
- 1977: Ravenna, William Girometti, "Il Coccio" art gallery, 30 December 1976 – 14 January 1977
- 1977: Bologna, William Girometti, "La Buca dell'Artista" art gallery, 20 March-3 April
- 1977: Bologna, William Girometti, "Portici" art gallery, 26 March-3 April
- 1978: Milan, William Girometti, "Zecchillo D'Essai" art gallery, 1–14 February
- 1979: Bologna, William Girometti, "Vetrina D'Essai" art gallery, 2–21 December
- 1981: Modena, William Girometti, "Emilia" art gallery, 31 January-20 February
- 1998: Bologna, Le stagioni di un artista: un itinerario di vita artistica fra sculture, disegni, pittura. Retrospettiva dedicata a William Girometti, Sala Silentium, 21 April-3 May; organized by the University of Bologna and by the Comune.
- 2024: Mantua, William Girometti - Rigore e metamorfosi, Museo diocesano Francesco Gonzaga, 10–25 February

== Collective exhibitions ==
- 1975: Porto Verde (Misano Adriatico), Comunità Europea Artisti, 2–23 August
- 1977: Bologna, Commissione Cultura Sport e Tempo Libero, 1 May-5 June
- 1978: Bologna, "Portici" art gallery, 3–19 January
- 1978: Bologna, Teatro Comunale, 8–10 December
- 1979: Modena and Pinarella di Cervia, "Ghirlandina Arte" art gallery, 1 June-30 September
- 1980: Bologna, Centro Arte e Ricerca, 14–30 June
- 1980: Bologna, Circolo Artistico, 21 June-13 July
- 1981: Bologna, Museo Civico, 30 July-2 August
- 1981: Bologna, Palazzo d'Accursio, Salone d'Ercole, 2–31 December
- 1982: Altedo, Sala Rinascita, 22–23 May
- 1983: Genova-Cornigliano, Palazzo Bombrini, 14–24 January
- 1983: Altedo, Sala Rinascita, 28–31 May
- 1987: Bologna, Palazzo Re Enzo, Sala dei Trecento
- 1998: Bologna, Primavera Spring Printemps: mostra di pittura all'aperto, Piazzetta di via San Nicolò, 29–31 May; organized by the University of Bologna and by the Comune among others.
- 2024: Milan, Museo d'arte e scienza, 27 January-5 February

== Prizes and awards ==
- First prize – Premio Internazionale di Pittura "L'Arte a difesa della natura" ("Art in defense of nature"), Rome
  1974 L'attualità di Shakespeare, Discorso su tema ecologico
- Gold medal – Prima Quadriennale Europea d'Arte Contemporanea (European Exhibition of Contemporary Art), Rome
  1974 Problema non risolto
- Gold medal – Seconda Rassegna Internazionale di Pittura "Premio Alba"
  1974 Colonna sonora, Partita impegnativa, Siamo preparati alla vita in comune?
- Gold medal and solo exhibition in Milan – Secondo Premio di Pittura "Vecchia Varese"
  1974 In attesa di giudizio
- Silver medal – Secondo premio di pittura contemporanea Città di Vergato
  1974 Proteso a nuove conquiste, Partita impegnativa, Ritratto di signora ignota
- Silver plaque – Premio Internazionale di Pittura, Scultura e Grafica "Il Pennello d'Oro", Milan
  1974 Ispirazione sopita, Calamità naturale
- Meeting Trophy – Meeting Interregionale di Pittura "Premio Città di Trecate"
  1974 In attesa di giudizio
- Artistic Award Cup – Primo Concorso Nazionale di Pittura, Grafica e Poesia dei Colli Euganei "Omaggio a Francesco Petrarca"
  1974 Proteso a nuove conquiste, La stupidità: un male inguaribile
- Bronze medal – Quattordicesima Mostra di Pittura "Sotto i Portici", Concorso Nazionale organizzato dal Circolo Amici dell'Arte, Pieve di Cento
  1974 Vagheggiamenti d'un drogato
- Trophy "C. Magistretti" – Primo Premio di Pittura "Vecchia Modena"
  1975 Armonie della natura
- Artistic Award Cup – Premio di Pittura "Natale del Pittore", Varese
  1975 Realtà incombente
- Second prize in the artistic merit – Premio Internazionale di Pittura (International Painting Competition) "Dante Alighieri", Rome
  1976 C... come condizionamento
- First prize – Premio Nazionale di Pittura "Portici", Bologna
  1977 Disamina della verità obiettiva
  1979 Spontaneità preclusa

== Picture Gallery ==
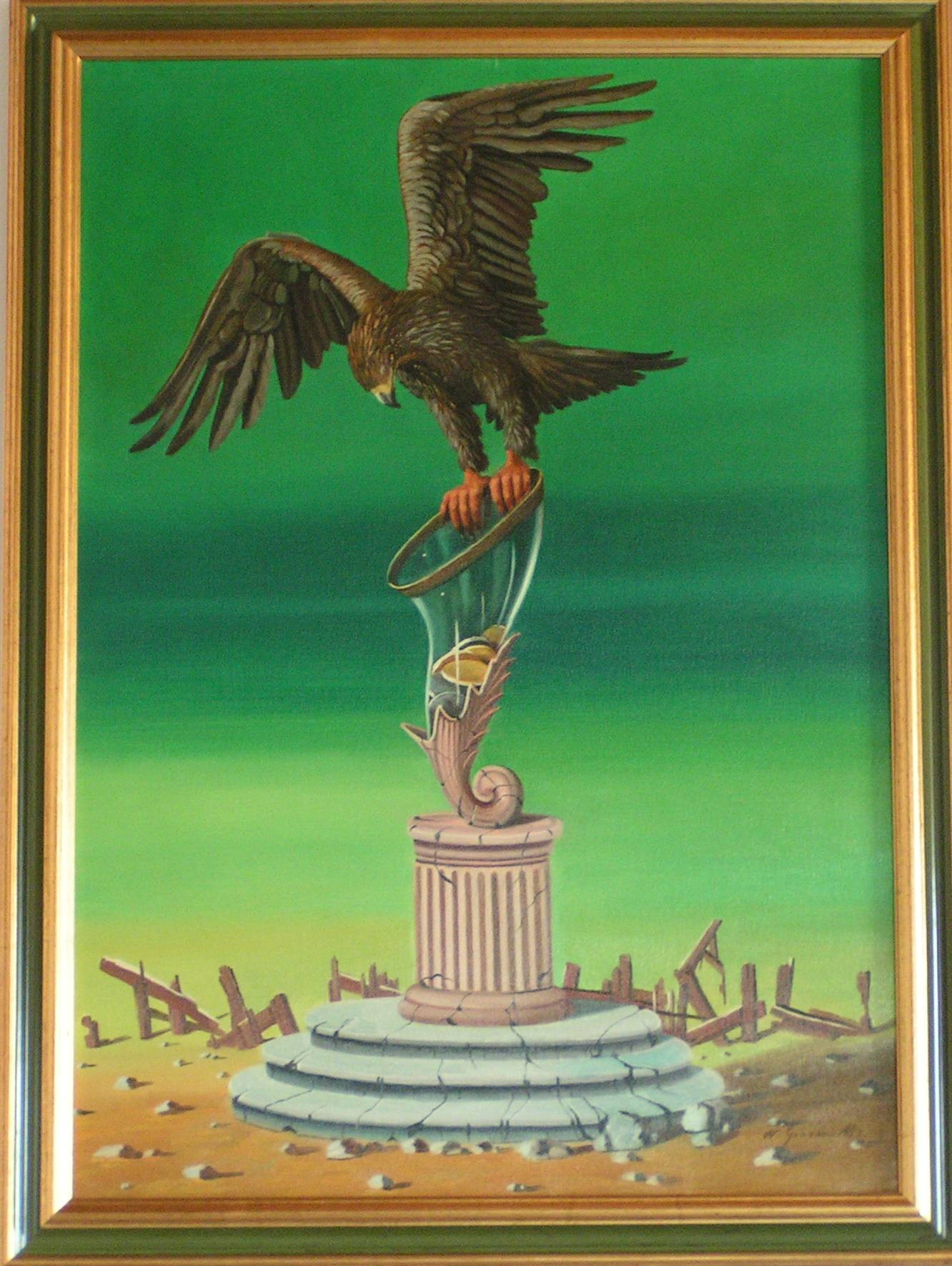
L'idolo di tutti i tempi, 1974

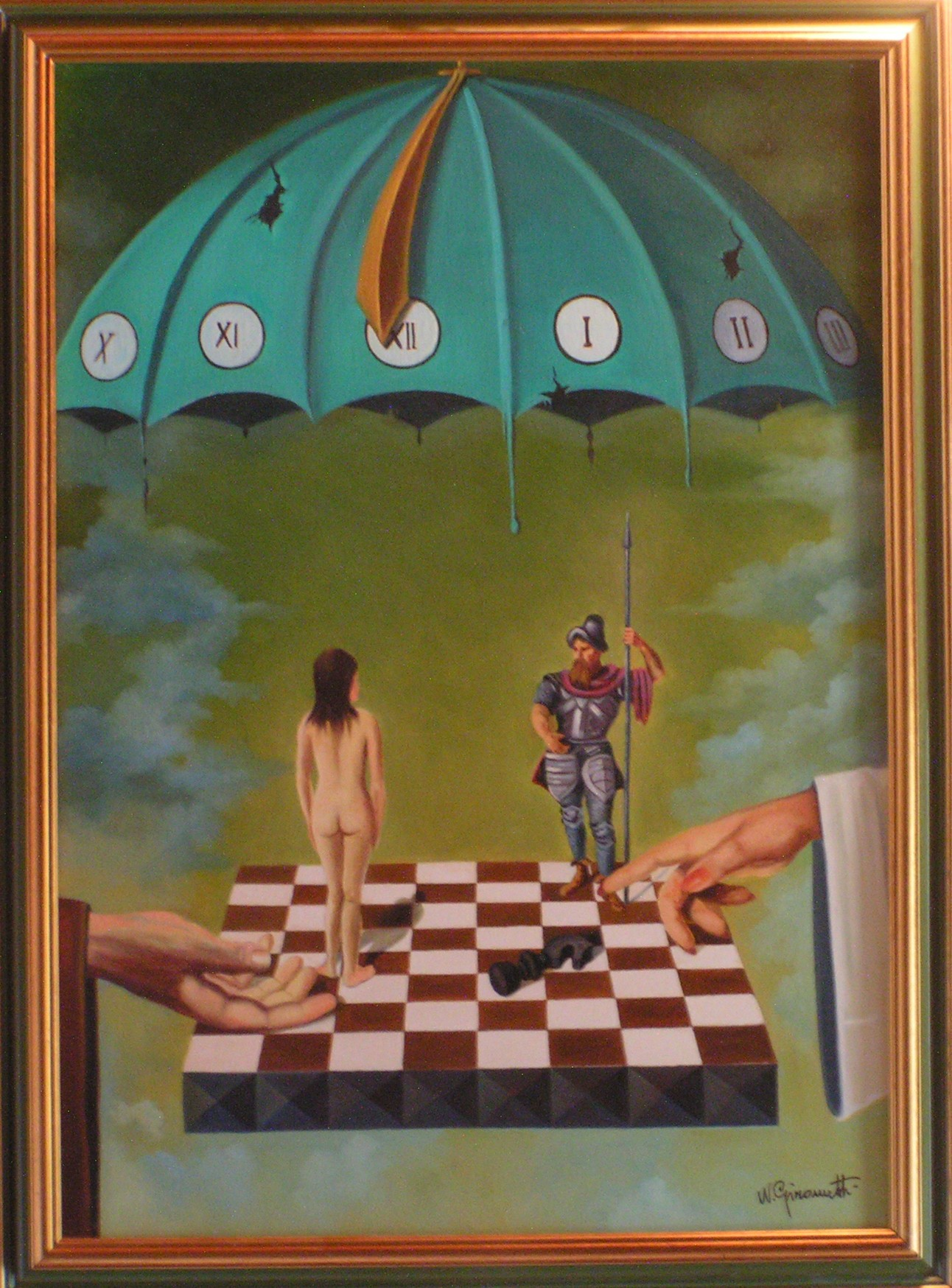
Partita impegnativa, 1972

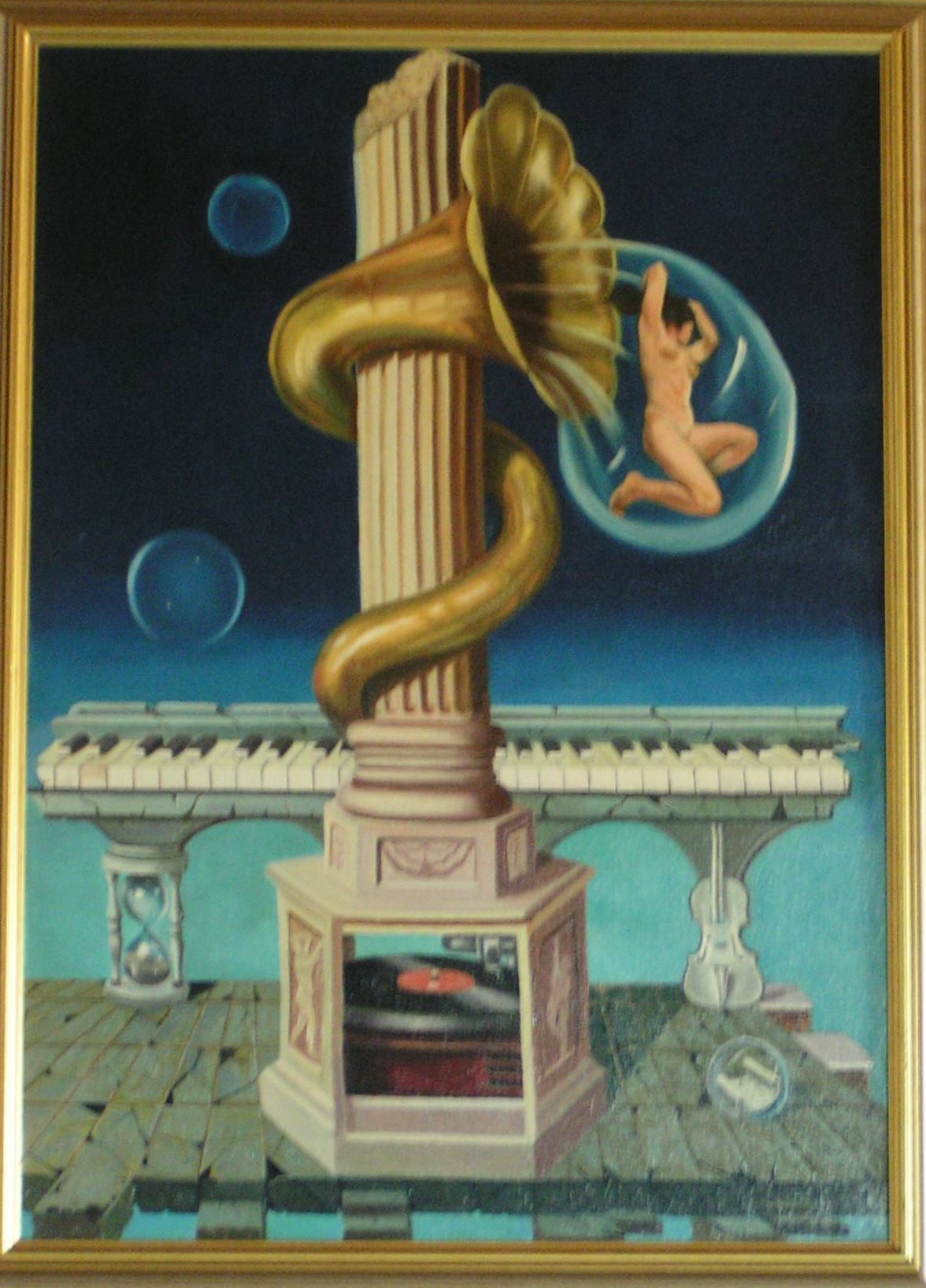
Colonna sonora (omaggio a P.I.Tchaikovsky), 1973

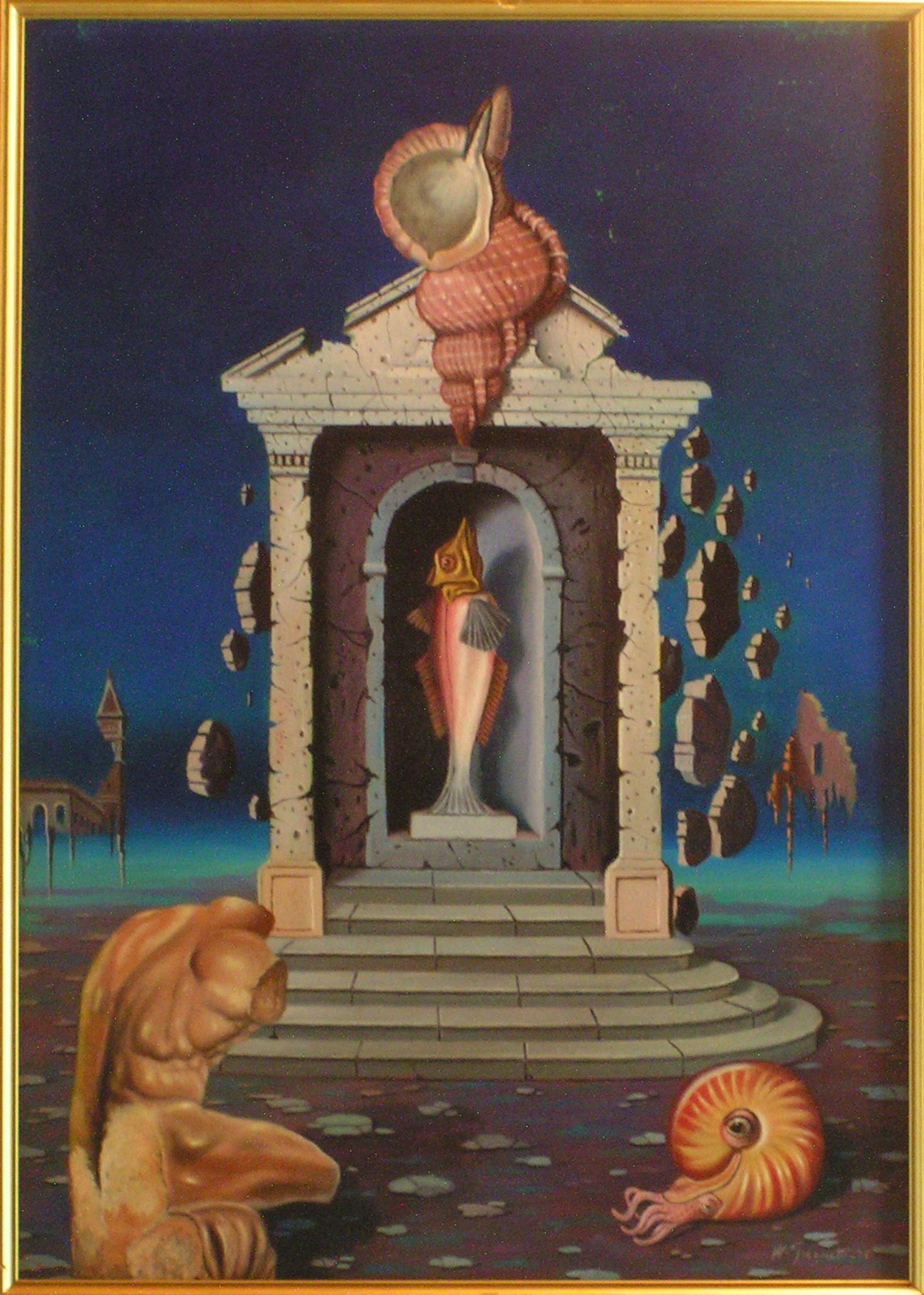
Escalation indiscriminata, 1975

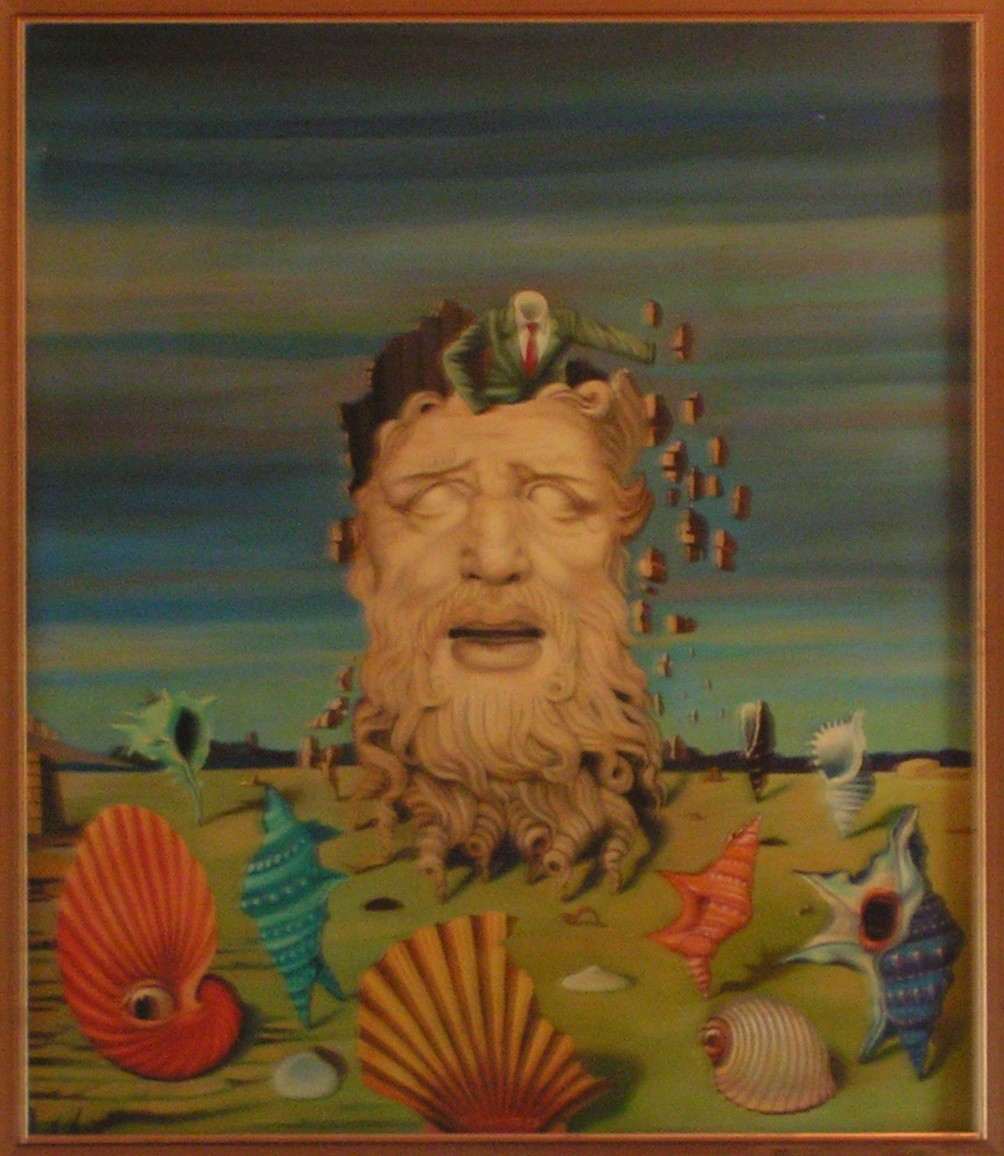
Dialettica illusoria, 1974

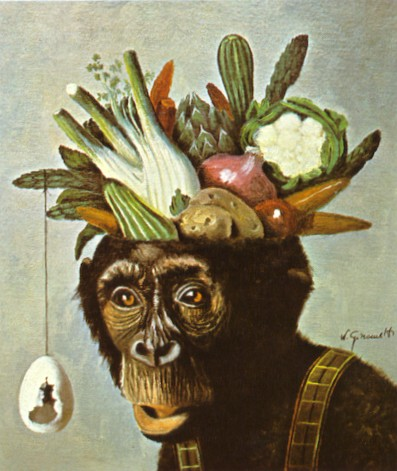
La stupidità, un male inguaribile, 1973

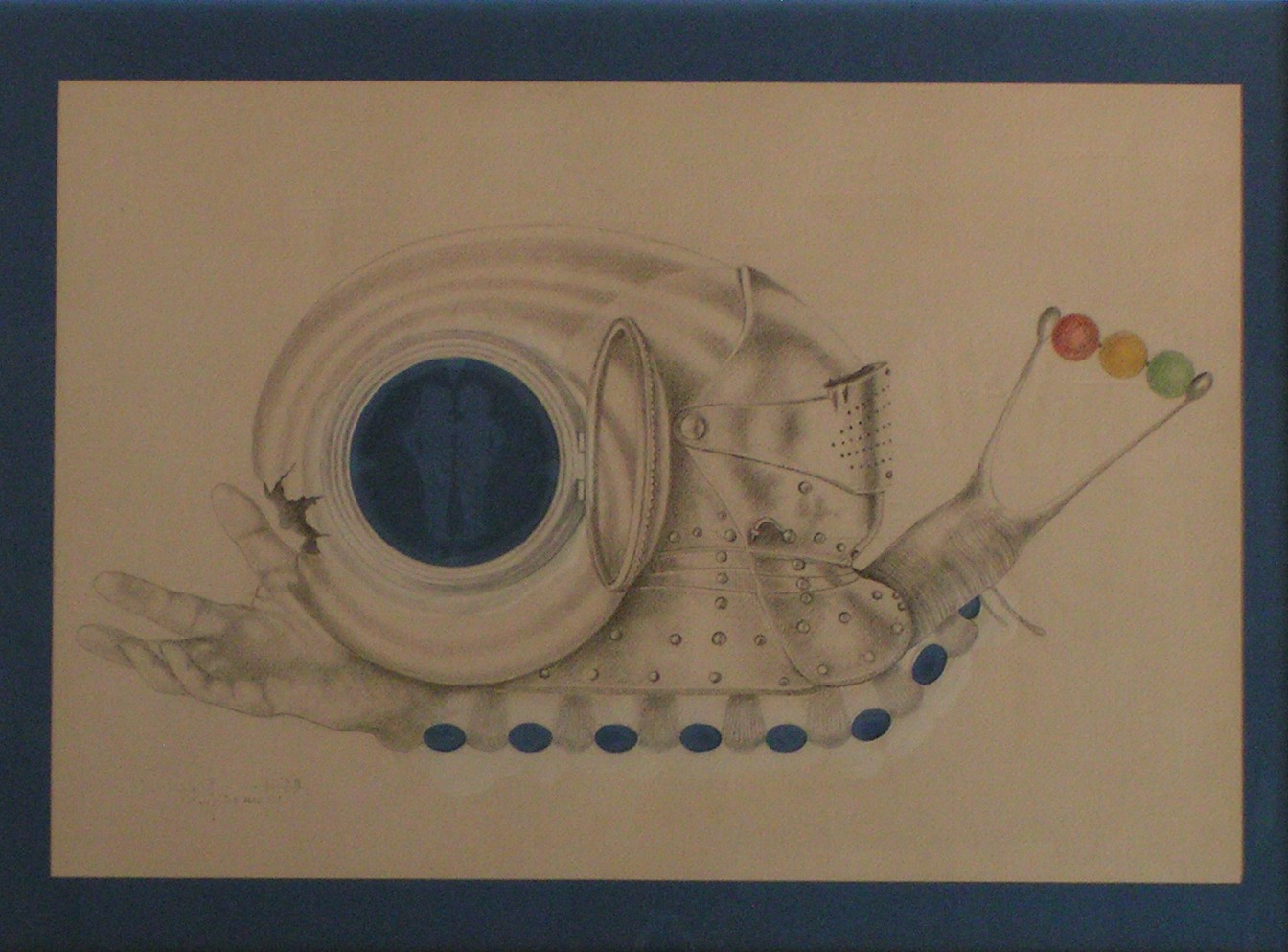
Enigmatico futuro, 1979

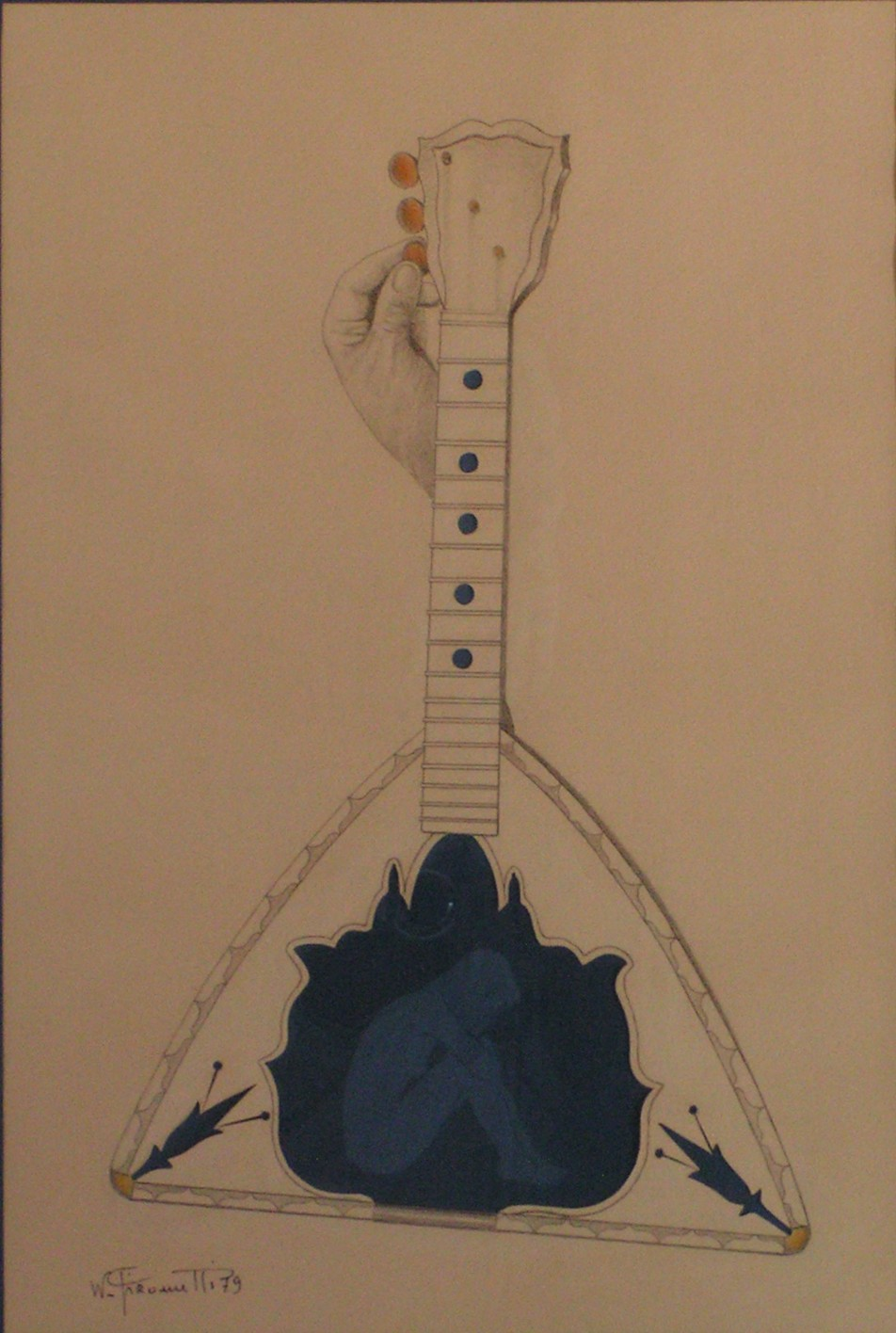
Senza titolo (La balalaika), 1979

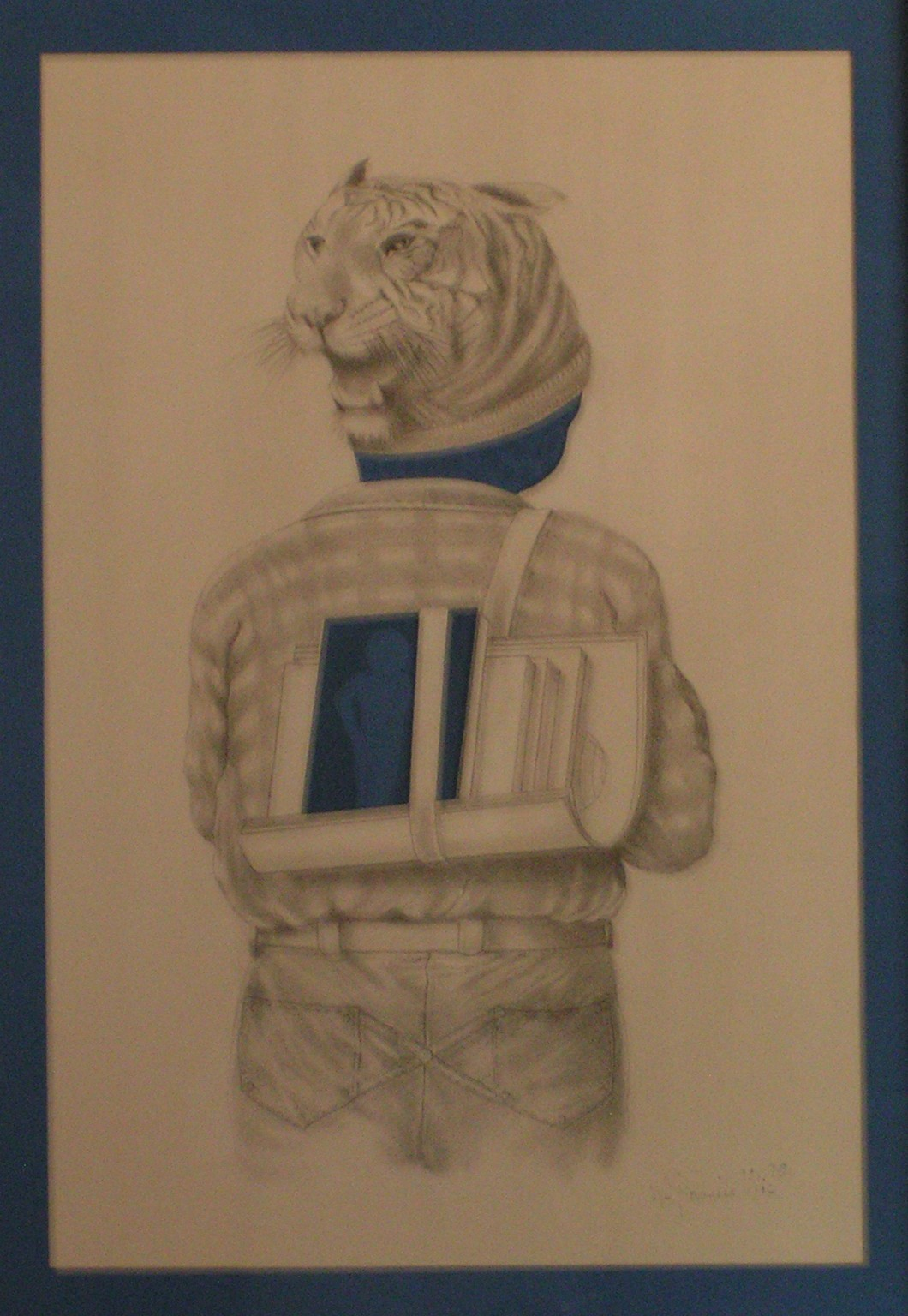
Spontaneità preclusa (Giovane studente), 1979

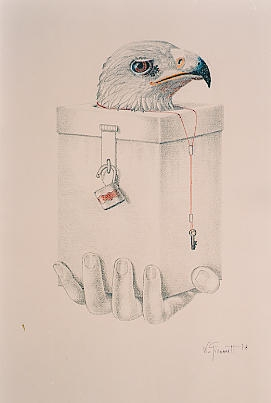
Libertà soffocata, 1978

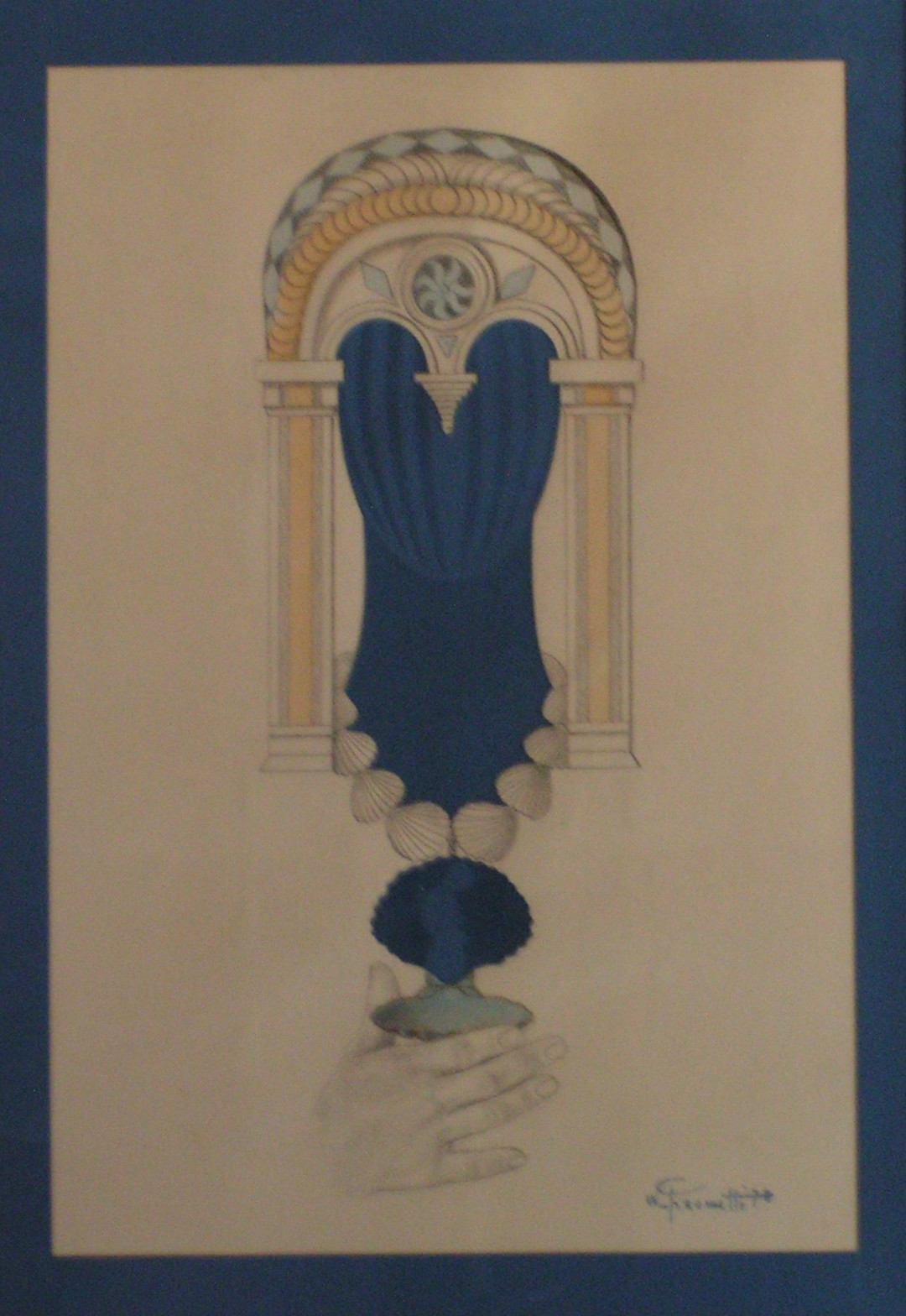
Senza titolo, 1978

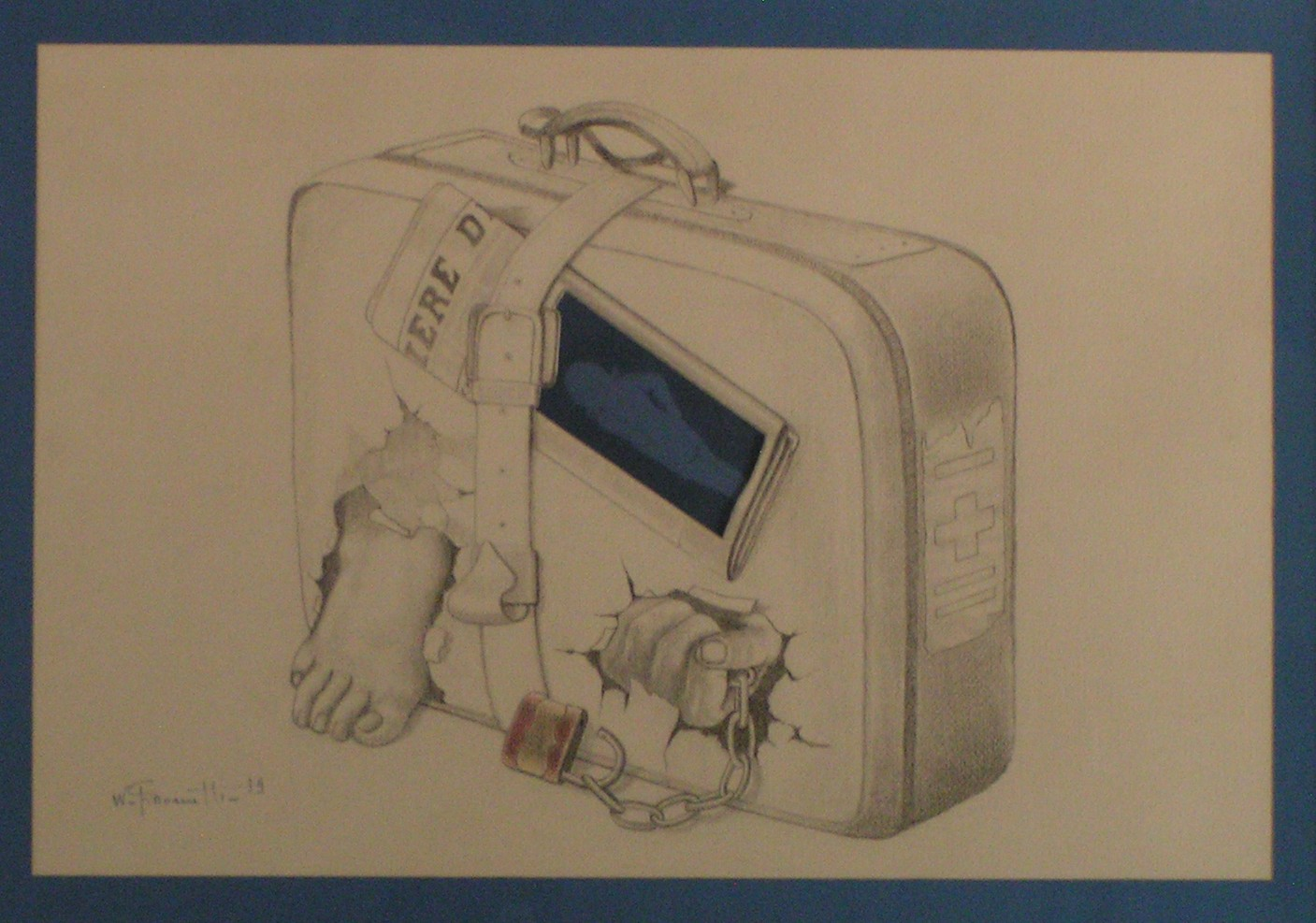
Senza titolo, 1979

== See also ==
- Surrealism
