= Cervia =

- Comune
- Comune di Cervia
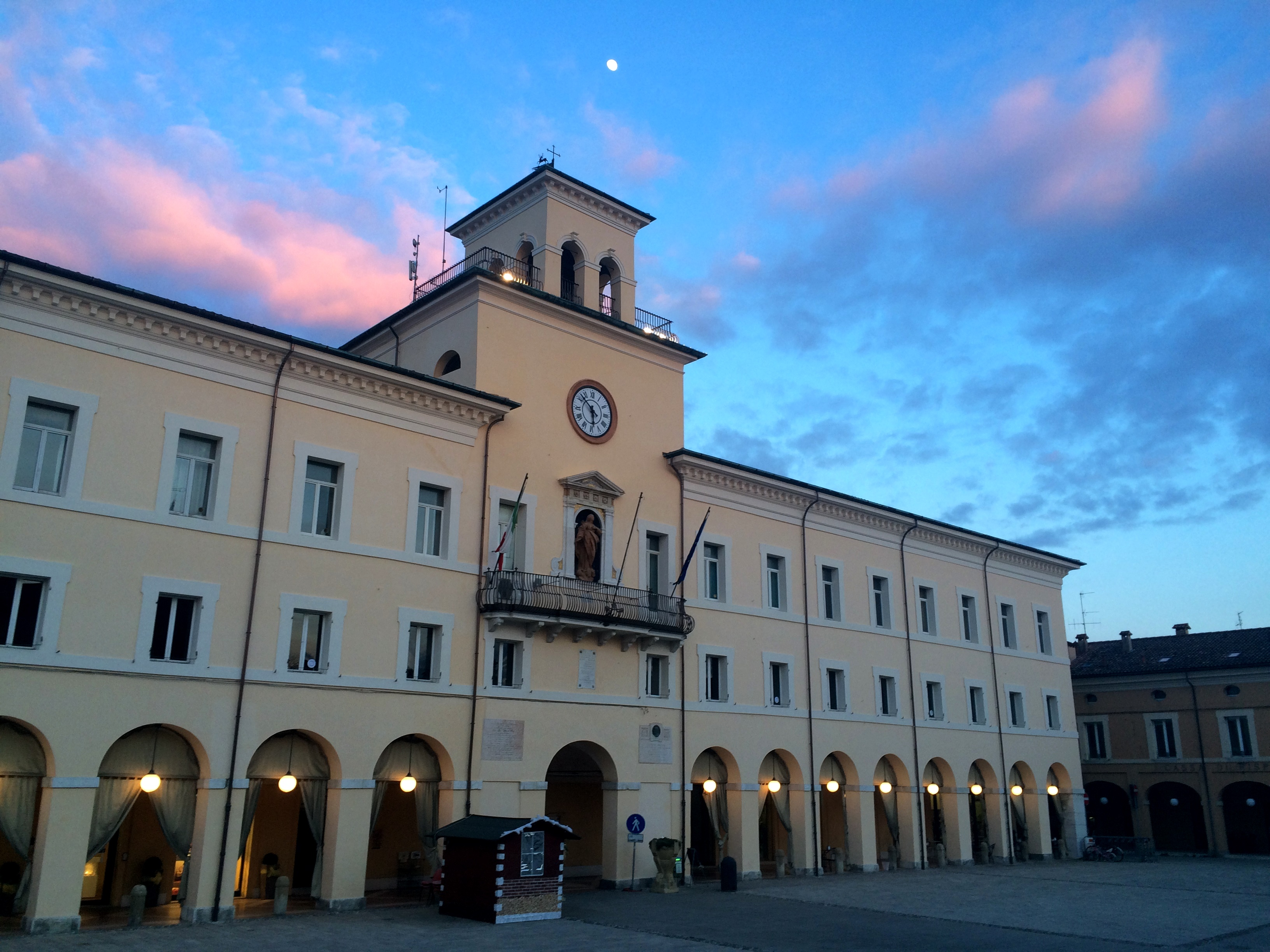
- Town Hall

- Location within Italy Location within Emilia-Romagna
- Coordinates: 44°15′31″N 12°21′21″E
- Country: Italy
- Region: Emilia-Romagna
- Province: Province of Ravenna (RA)
- Frazioni: Cannuzzo, Castiglione di Cervia, Milano Marittima, Montaletto, Pinarella, Pisignano, Savio di Cervia, Tagliata, Terme, Villa Inferno

Government
  - Mayor: Mattia Missiroli

Area
  - Total: 82 km^{2} (32 sq mi)
- Elevation: 3 m (9.8 ft)

Population (1 January 2023)
  - Total: 28,983
  - Density: 350/km^{2} (920/sq mi)
- Demonym: Cervesi
- Time zone: UTC+1 (CET)
  - Summer (DST): UTC+2 (CEST)
- Postal code: 48015, 48016, 48010
- Dialing code: 0544
- Patron saint: Saint Paternian
- Saint day: 13 November
- Website: Official website

Cervia (Romagnol: Zirvia) is a seaside resort town in the province of Ravenna, located in the northern Italian region of Emilia-Romagna.

Cervia is a major seaside resort in Emilia-Romagna, North Italy. Its population was 28,983 at the 2023 census. It is mainly a destination for seaside tourism, with a coastline of 9 km of beach.

== History ==
The oldest human discovery in the area occurred in the hamlet of Montaletto: most likely it is a Bronze Age shepherds' camp dating back to about 3,000 - 1,000 B.C. The salt marshes were probably already active in the Etruscan age, as findings during urban planning works carried out in recent years would indicate. It is possible that lodgings, or perhaps settlements, existed for salt workers, even seasonal ones; the findings indicate a certain population density already in the first century BC. Until the Roman age, the city had the name "Ficocle", but its exact location is not known.

Later the centre was rebuilt in a more secure position, in the Salina. This medieval city grew until it was provided with three fortified entrances, a Palace of Priors, seven churches and a castle (Rocca) which, according to legend, was built by Emperor Frederick Barbarossa. The name also changed from Ficocle to Cervia, probably referring to the Acervi, great amounts of salt left in the local evaporation ponds. After a long series of events, it became part of the Papal States.

As time passed, the salt pond turned into a marsh, and on 9 November 1697 Pope Innocent XII ordered it to be rebuilt in a safer location. The new city had huge silos for the storage of salt, containing up to 13,000 tons.

Cervia is also mentioned in Dante's Divine Comedy (Inferno, Canto XXVII, lines 40–42).

== Town information ==
Nowadays Cervia is a seaside resort on the Adriatic Riviera thanks to its 9-kilometre (6 mi) shore characterised by sandy beaches. Unlike its neighbour Cesenatico, the buildings are subject to strict urban regulations, favouring the conservation of the pine forest and green areas between each new construction.

Cervia has a large pine forest of about 260 hectares, which includes the areas of Milano Marittima, Cervia, Pinarella and Tagliata. A project with the local authority of ARPA is active for the control of water, at various points between the beach in Milano Marittima and that of Pinarella. The results show that the water quality was good enough to secure the blue flag of the Foundation for Environmental Education for nine consecutive year (from 1997). The levels of these wastewaters have been excellent in recent years, except for some small survey of 2002 and 2004 that triggered the alarm but were soon mitigated and brought within the required range.

House prices in Cervia ranked second highest in the Emilia Romagna region in a 2009 research, only after Bologna. With the development of the neighbourhood Milano Marittima, the presence of nightclubs and outdoor dances were banned from the centre of Cervia, in order to respect the comfort of residents and tourists.

Cervia was Italy's first city to host an IRONMAN Triathlon, drawing world-class athletes from all over the world.

== Economy ==
=== Salt extraction ===
The salt production activity, known since Roman and Medieval times, grew in importance due to the changes made to the Po delta and the decline of salt production in Comacchio. Artisanal production was then replaced by industrial forms in 1959. However, the ancient Camillone saltworks remain, the last of the 144 production saltworks which were active up to 1959. It is still used for demonstration purposes to raise awareness about the activity of the salt workers. The fund can produce between 500 and 2,000 quintals of salt per season.

=== Fishing ===
The fishing activity is specialized in small-scale fishing with postal gear and in the breeding of mussels. The first activity is mainly oriented towards the direct sale of the catch and has developed in recent years allowing for a generalized renewal of the fleet. Mussel farming, which has been practiced since the 1980s, is instead favored by the environmental conditions of the Romagna coast.

=== Tourism ===
Cervia is mainly a destination for seaside tourism, with a coastline of 9 km of equipped beach, and has become one of the busiest tourist locations in Emilia Romagna. It has many restaurants, bed and breakfasts, and hotels, and is a popular vacation spot in the warm months. In 2017, it hosted a total of almost three million eight hundred thousand tourists. It is the fourth Italian center with the highest number of hotels: 371 for a total of 27,264 beds.

=== Marriage of the Sea ===
The Marriage of the Sea (Italian: Sposalizio del Mare) is an annual ceremony held in Cervia on the day of the Ascension. It is considered one of the city’s oldest traditional rites and symbolically celebrates the union between opposing natural elements, interpreted as a wish for serenity and prosperity.

The origins of the celebration are linked to ancient propitiatory rituals connected with the sea, and the ceremony also recalls a similar rite historically practiced in the Republic of Venice until its fall in 1797. The Cervia tradition was instituted in 1445 by Cardinal Pietro Barbo, then Bishop of Cervia and later Pope Paul II, who, according to tradition, vowed to repeat every year the gesture of casting a ring into the sea after surviving a violent storm during a voyage.

In the local Romagnol dialect the festival is known as la Sénsia, meaning simply “Ascension”.

== Climate ==
Cervia has a humid subtropical climate (Köppen: Cfa).

Climate data for Cervia (Cervia Air Base) (1991–2020)
Month	Jan	Feb	Mar	Apr	May	Jun	Jul	Aug	Sep	Oct	Nov	Dec	Year
Record high °C (°F)	20.0 (68.0)	20.1 (68.2)	27.3 (81.1)	30.0 (86.0)	33.0 (91.4)	35.8 (96.4)	38.2 (100.8)	39.2 (102.6)	34.9 (94.8)	29.2 (84.6)	26.9 (80.4)	20.2 (68.4)	39.2 (102.6)
Mean daily maximum °C (°F)	7.7 (45.9)	10.1 (50.2)	14.2 (57.6)	18.1 (64.6)	23.0 (73.4)	27.4 (81.3)	29.9 (85.8)	29.9 (85.8)	25.1 (77.2)	19.6 (67.3)	13.3 (55.9)	8.3 (46.9)	18.9 (66.0)
Daily mean °C (°F)	3.8 (38.8)	5.0 (41.0)	8.9 (48.0)	12.7 (54.9)	17.3 (63.1)	21.7 (71.1)	24.1 (75.4)	24.0 (75.2)	19.5 (67.1)	14.9 (58.8)	9.6 (49.3)	4.6 (40.3)	13.8 (56.8)
Mean daily minimum °C (°F)	0.2 (32.4)	0.4 (32.7)	3.5 (38.3)	7.1 (44.8)	11.4 (52.5)	15.5 (59.9)	17.8 (64.0)	18.0 (64.4)	14.1 (57.4)	10.5 (50.9)	6.0 (42.8)	1.3 (34.3)	8.8 (47.8)
Record low °C (°F)	−8.5 (16.7)	−14.2 (6.4)	−6.3 (20.7)	−2.5 (27.5)	−0.9 (30.4)	6.9 (44.4)	9.6 (49.3)	8.8 (47.8)	4.9 (40.8)	0.7 (33.3)	−2.6 (27.3)	−11.5 (11.3)	−14.2 (6.4)
Average precipitation mm (inches)	35.1 (1.38)	48.4 (1.91)	49.7 (1.96)	54.5 (2.15)	55.6 (2.19)	37.5 (1.48)	32.9 (1.30)	39.7 (1.56)	73.3 (2.89)	75.6 (2.98)	70.7 (2.78)	54.1 (2.13)	627.1 (24.69)
Average precipitation days (≥ 1.0 mm)	5.6	5.9	6.3	7.2	6.7	4.3	4.2	3.9	7.1	7.6	8.5	6.7	74.1
Average relative humidity (%)	84.4	79.6	76.8	77.1	75.4	73.6	72.4	73.7	76.6	81.7	84.7	84.7	78.4
Average dew point °C (°F)	0.7 (33.3)	1.0 (33.8)	4.0 (39.2)	7.2 (45.0)	11.8 (53.2)	14.8 (58.6)	17.0 (62.6)	17.6 (63.7)	14.4 (57.9)	11.3 (52.3)	6.1 (43.0)	2.0 (35.6)	9.0 (48.2)
Mean monthly sunshine hours	137.9	154.3	199.6	213.9	265.7	283.5	321.2	290.8	224.4	160.3	120.6	139.5	2,511.7
Source: NOAA, (Dew Point 1981-2010)

== Main sights ==
- The Cathedral (Santa Maria Assunta), built in 1699–1702
- The Museum of Salt
- The Communal Palace
- St. Michael Tower

== Transportation ==
The city is served by the road Strada statale 16 Adriatica or Romea South. It is possible reach the Autostrada A14 (Italy) at Cesena (15 km) and Rimini (24 km). Cervia is located about 103 km south of Bologna, 311 km away from Milan and 359 km from Rome.

== Notable people ==
- Isotta Gervasi (1889–1967), physician, one of the first women to practice in Italy
- Maria Goia (1878–1924), politician, feminist, and trade unionist

== Twin towns/sister cities ==
- Southampton, New York, United States
- Monterey, United States
- Jelenia Góra, Poland
- Mahón, Spain
- Cluj-Napoca, Romania
- Aalen, Germany

== Gallery ==
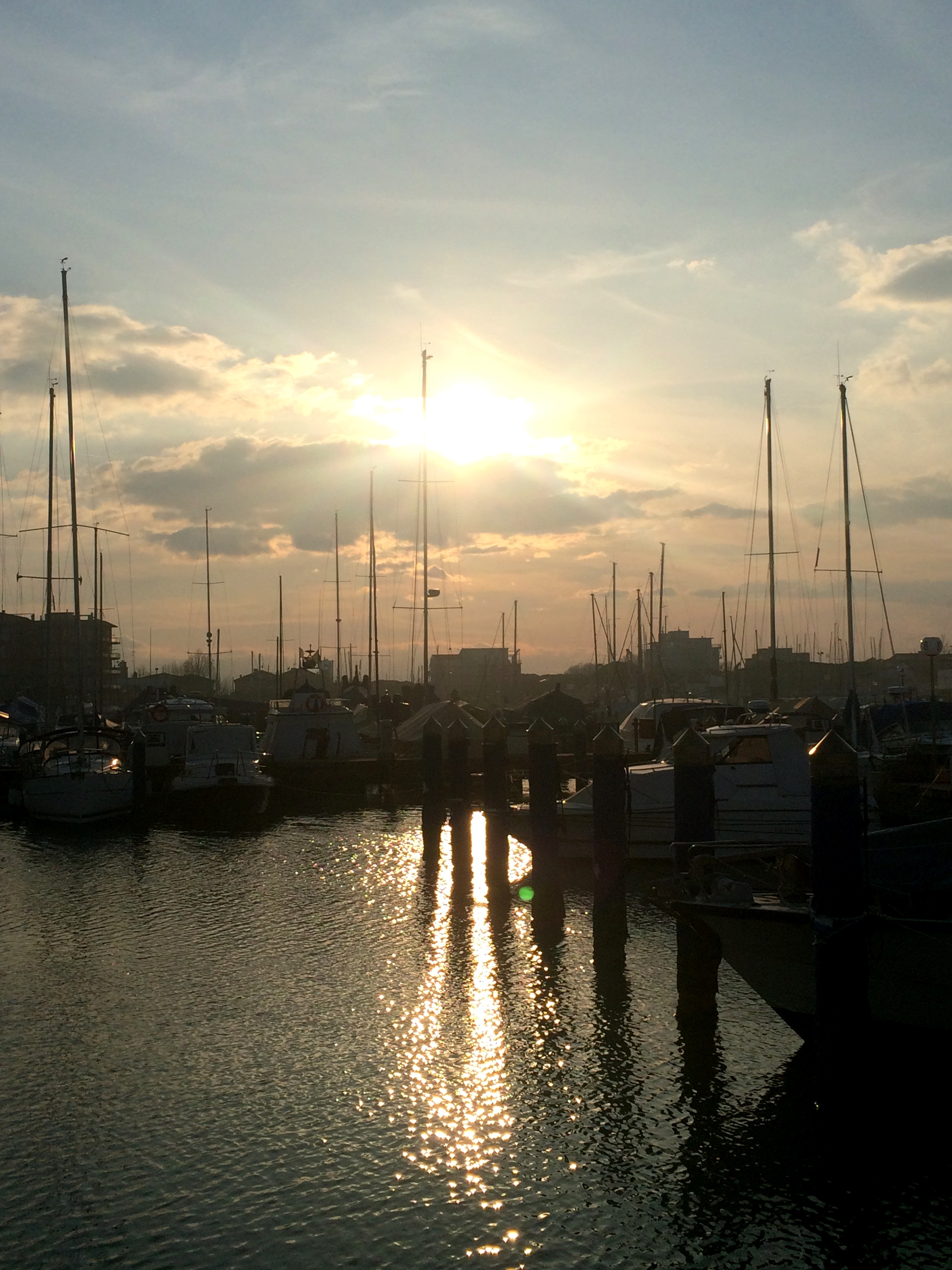
Cervia Harbour in 2015

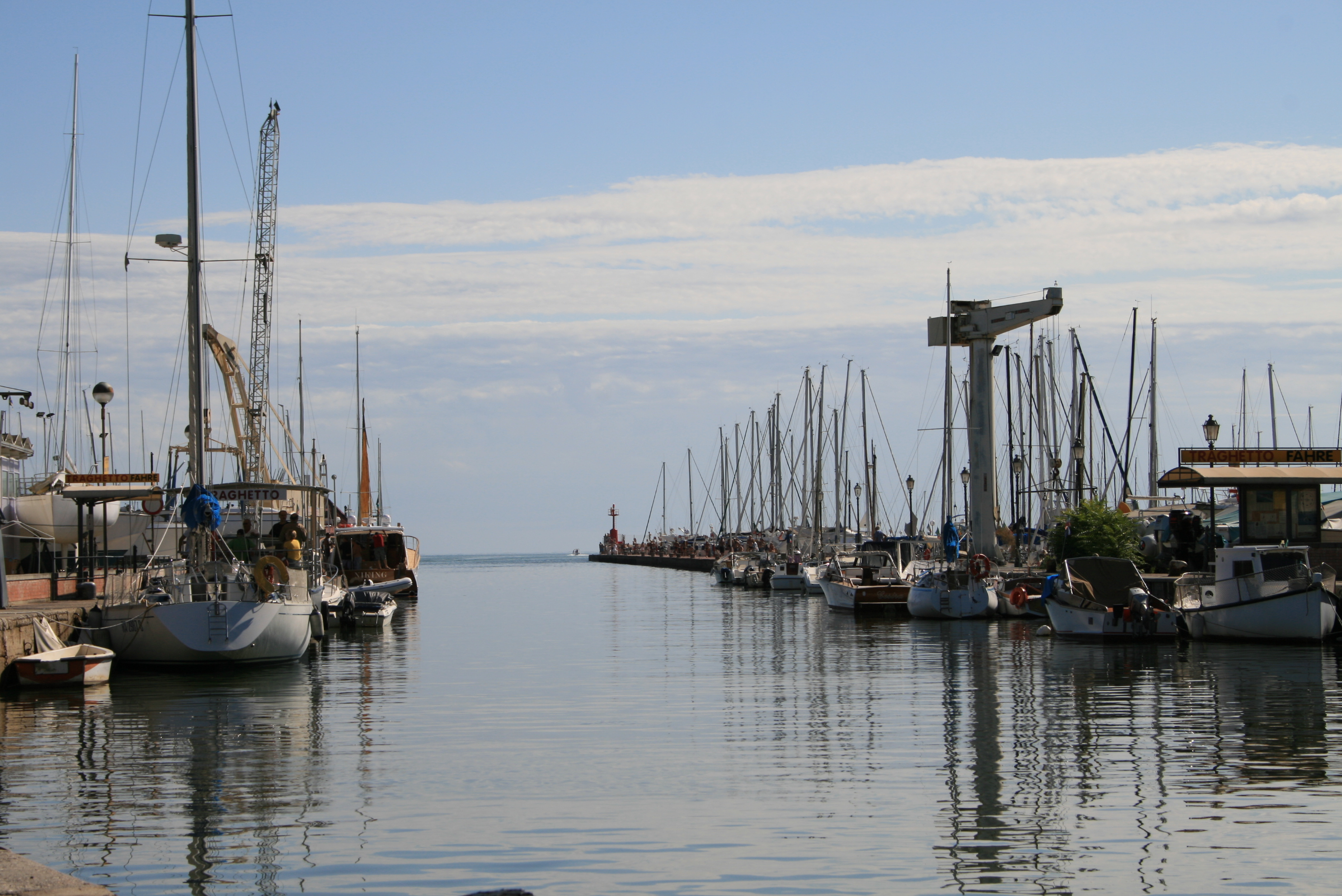
Harbour

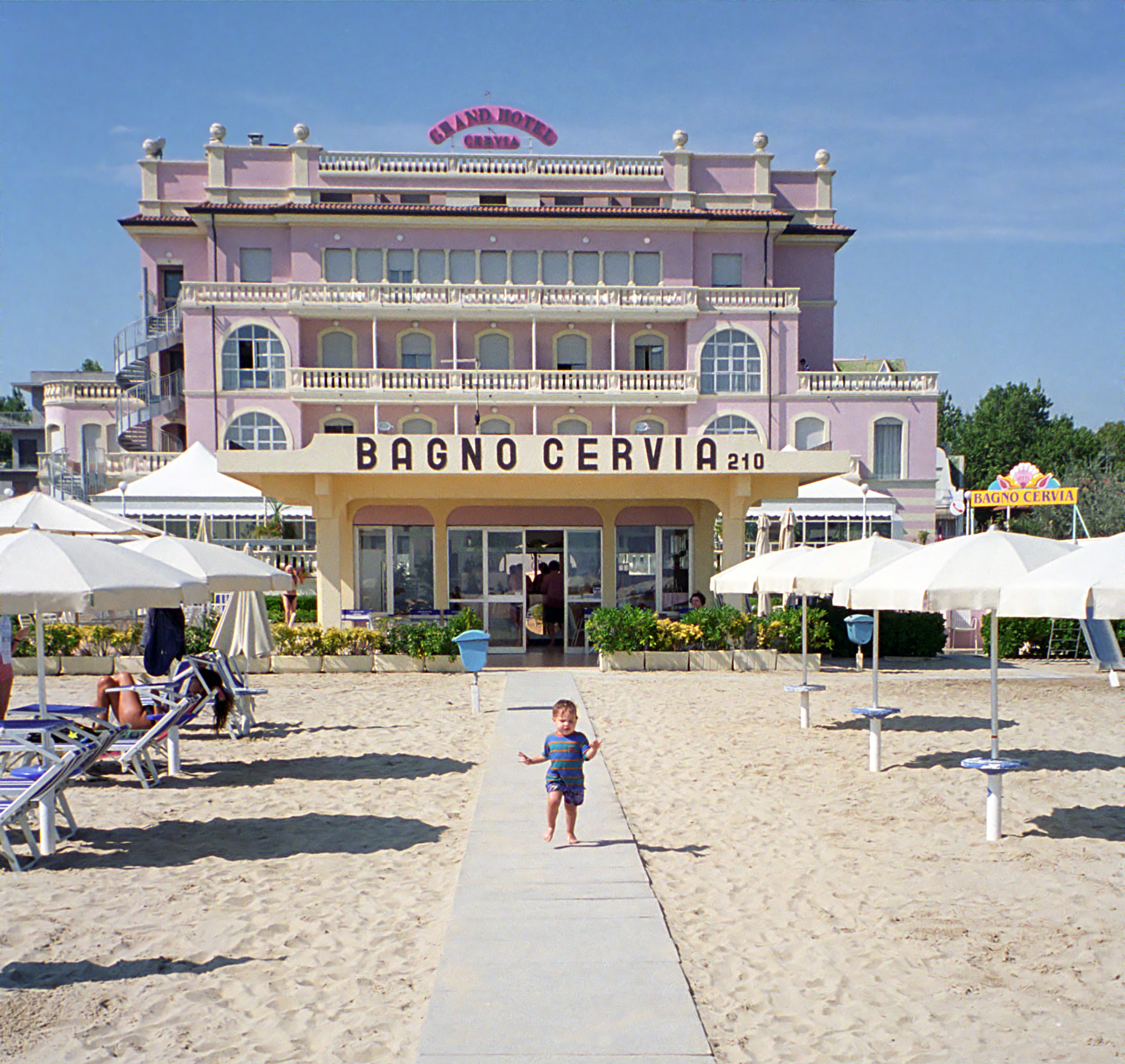
The beach

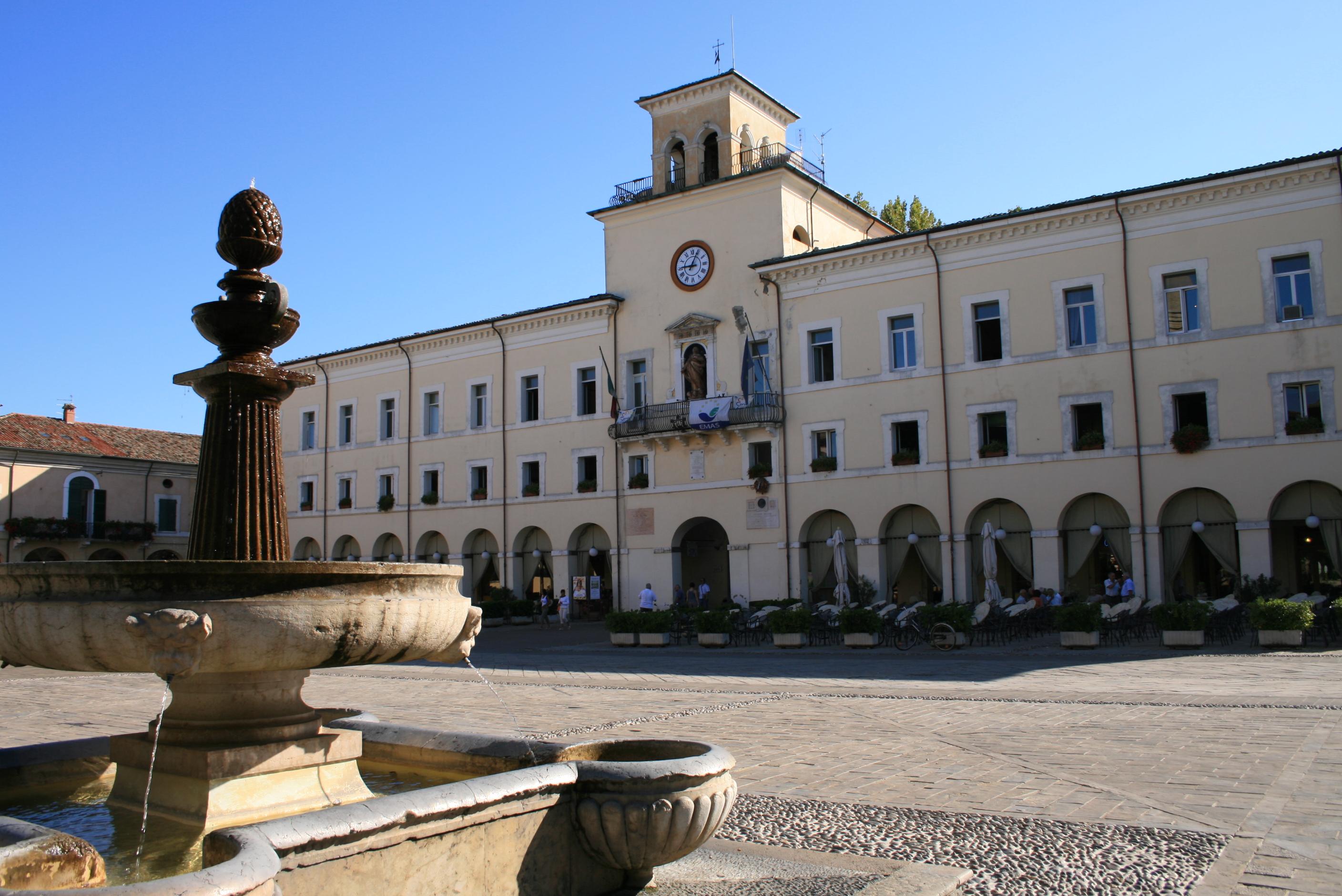
City Hall

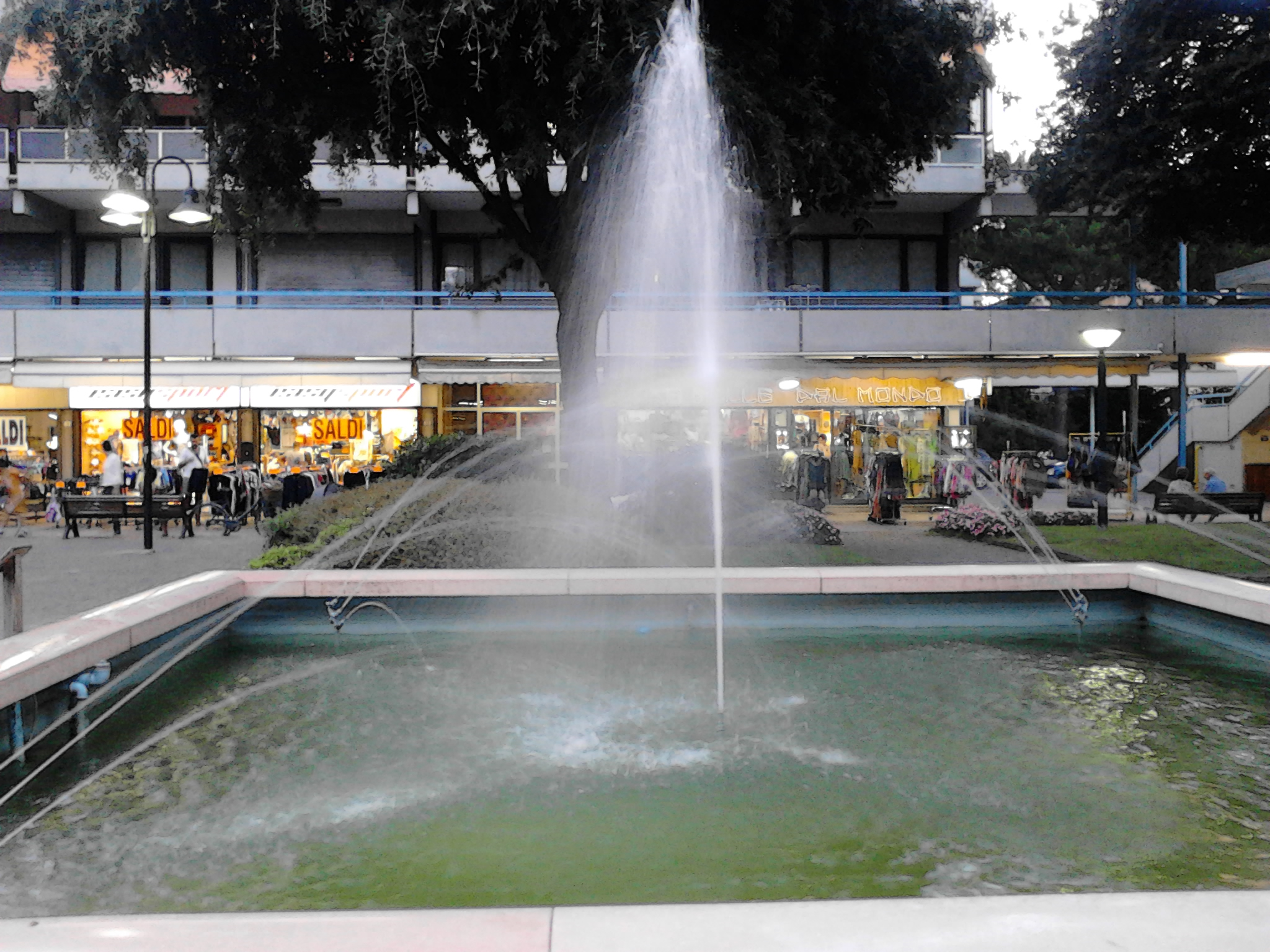
The fountain of Piazza dell'Unità in Pinarella

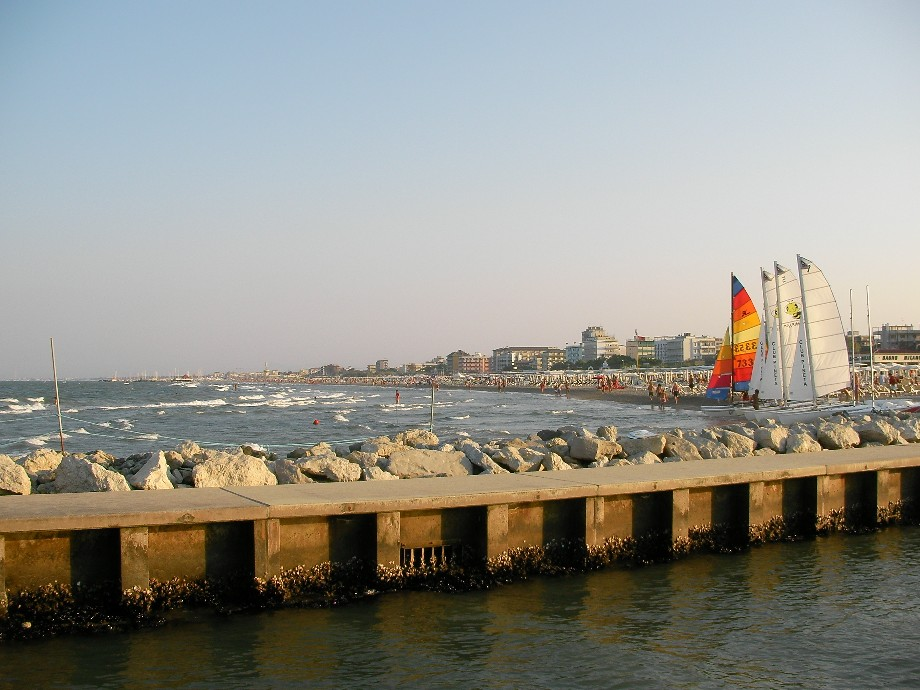
Beach of Cervia

== See also ==
- Diocese of Cervia
