= Maria Goia =

Italian politician, feminist, and trade unionist

Maria Goia (28 November 1878 – 15 October 1924) was an Italian politician, feminist, and trade unionist from Cervia. In 1915 she served as acting editor of La difesa delle lavoratrici, a women's biweekly publication founded in 1912.
