= Isotta Brothers =

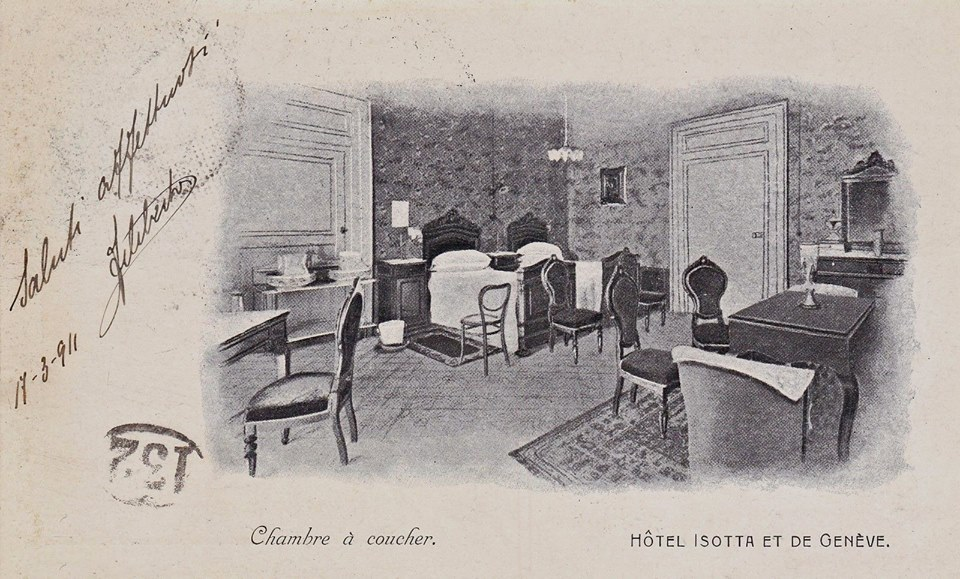
Room in the Hotel Isotta and Genève

The Isotta Brothers (Italian: Fratelli Isotta) were notable Italian hoteliers in the second half of the nineteenth century.

== Southern Italy ==
The Albergo di Ginevra (Geneva Hotel) was located in the centre of the city of Naples, facing the Medina fountain. It was a large building owned by the Passato family. From 1861 to 1862, it was operated by Francesco Ferrari, then in October 1863, a company was formed to operate it jointly owned by Ferrari and the Isotta brothers. Ferrari received a quarter of the profits. The Isotta brothers, who had contributed most of the capital, took the rest. The hotel became the most prestigious in the city. As of 1862, the brothers had also acquired the Hotel Central opposite the Hotel de Geneve with apartments catering to families. The holding company dissolved on 3 July 1867, and the Isotta brothers took full control of the hotel. Ferrari received 168,300 lire for his share.

As of 1873, the brothers also operated the Hotel Vittoria in Caserta. At that time, the Isotta brothers ran the restaurant service in boats operated by G. B. Lavarello, providing service to America. In 1877, the brothers were operating the Hotel Quisisana in Castellamare in the Gulf of Naples, and the Hotel de Geneve, Hotel Central and Hotel de Rome in Naples. The Hotel de Rome was co-owned by Bruschetti. In 1879, the brothers owned the Hotel de Geneva and Hotel Central in Naples and the Hotel Quissana in Castellamare.

== Genoa ==
As of 1865, the brothers owned the Hotel de France and Hotel National in Genoa in addition to the Hotel de Geneve in Naples. An 1868 guide described the Isottas' Hotel de France in Genoa as "clean, comfortable, and moderate" and the Hotel National in Genoa, also owned by the Isottas, as "convenient and good, with moderate prices. The Grand Hotel Isotta opened on Via Roma, Genoa, in 1877, an exclusive hotel with many comforts and conveniences. At the end of the 19th century, the hotel was sold to Giuseppa Borgarello. In 1879, in Genoa, the brothers owned the first-class Grand Hotel Isotta, as well as the Hotel de France. In 1887, they were still operating the Grand Hotel Isotta and the Hotel de France in Genoa.

== Sources ==
- Bradshaw, George (1879), Bradshaw's illustrated travellers' hand book to France
- Charnock, Richard Stephen (1865). Bradshaw's illustrated hand-book to Spain and Portugal. W.J. Adams. p. 29.
- Du Pays, Augustin Joseph (1862), Itinéraire descriptif, historique et artistique de la Hollande (in French), L. Hachette
- Englishman abroad (1864), Practical Swiss Guide: Red Book for Switzerland, the Adjoining Districts of Savoy, Piedmont, North Italy, the Introductory Routes from London by France, Belgium, Holland, and the Rhine
- Joanne, Adolphe (1865), Itinéraire général de la France: De Paris à la Mediterranée, Volume 2 (in French), Hachette
- Joanne, Paul (1887), Italie et Sicile, vol. 2, Hachette et cie
- John Murray (publishers) (1866). Handbook for travellers in Westmoreland and Cumberland. p. 62.
- Isambert, Émile (1873), Itinéraire descriptif, historique et archéologique de l'Orient: Grèce et Turquie d'Europe, vol. 8, Hachette
- Miss Fletcher, Il prestigioso Grand Hotel Isotta (in Italian)
- Quarta, O. (1 June 1880), "Ricchezza Mobile", Le Imposte Dirette (in Italian) (11)
- Seialoja, E. (8 June 1880), "Corte de Cassazione di Roma", Il Foro Italiano (in Italian), 5, Societa Editrice Il Foro Italiano ARL, JSTOR 23087097
