= Isotta Gervasi =

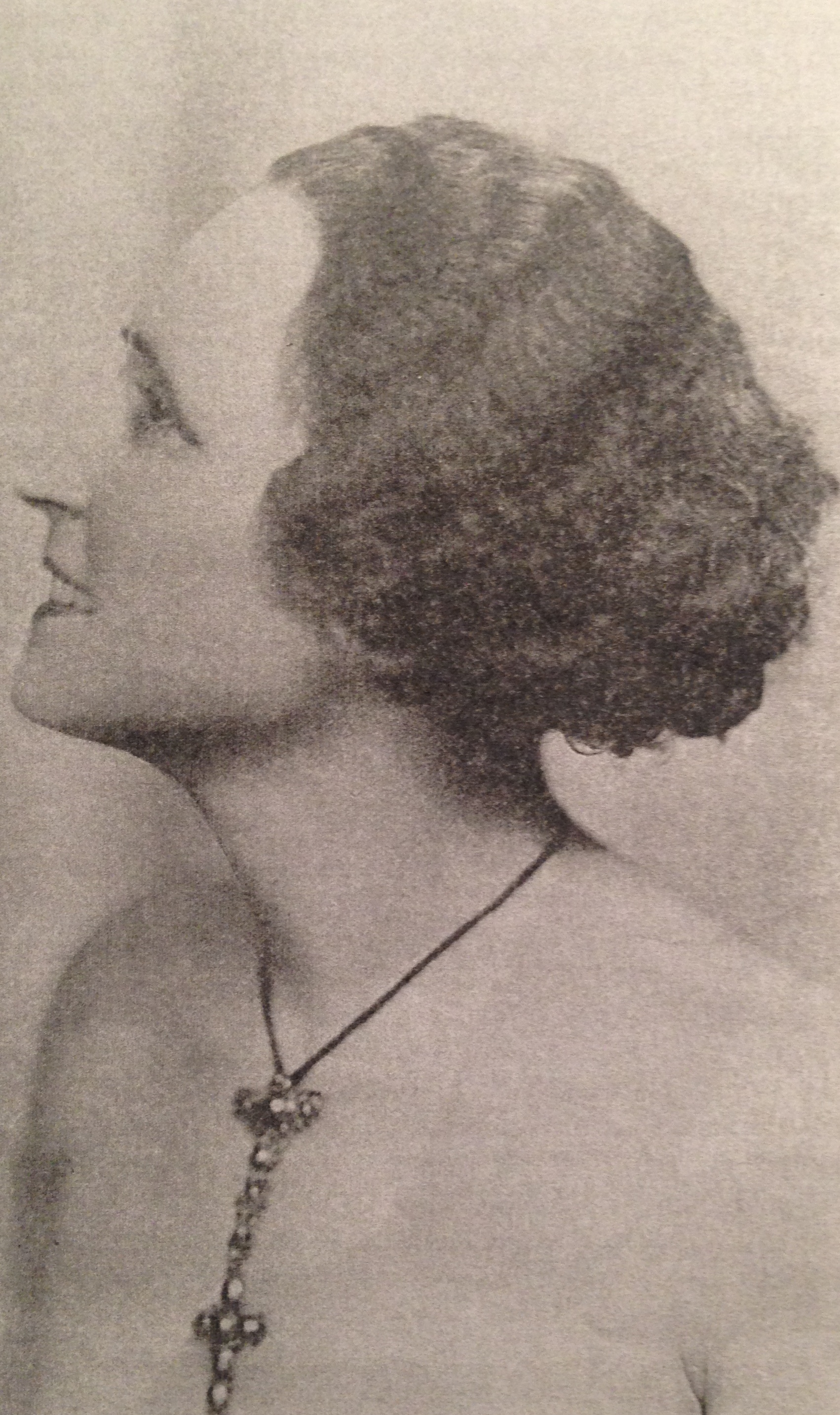
Portrait of a young Isotta Gervasi

Isotta Gervasi (Born in Castiglione di Cervia on 21 November 1889 – died in Modena on 17 June 1967) was an Italian physician. She was the first woman in Italy to work as a physician and practised in the Cervese area. Due to her determination to aid those in need, she acquired a legendary image over time, being remembered as the "doctor of the poor" and the "angel on a bicycle".

Grazia Deledda, a close friend of Isotta who was spending her holidays in Cervia, dedicated an elzeviro, an article in the third page of a newspaper, to her in Corriere della Sera in August 1935:

The doctor is beautiful, elegant, in the evening she transforms like the fairy Melusina, with her clothes and her dazzling jewels and her eyes and teeth even more dazzling: a fairy is also so in front of the sick bed, whether a prince or a worker, to whom, in addition to her skilful care, she generously gives bottles of ancient wine, chickens and flowers. Her name is Isotta.

== Biography ==
=== Family & education ===
Isotta Gervasi was born in Castiglione di Cervia on 21 November 1889. Her parents were Emilio Gervasi, a building contractor, and Virginia Ridolfi. Her family also attributed the names of Proserpina and Saffa to her. Isotta had eight other sisters, with herself being the eldest. One of her sisters, Emilia, also became a doctor. Another one of her sisters, Vittoria, became a journalist and worked for the Giornale d'Italia.

Isotta's parents valued the education of their daughters. This was especially unexpected since this was a time when education was usually reserved for the sons of a family, while the daughters were confined to more domestic roles.

She attended high school, initially at "Vincenzo Monti" in Cesena, then transferred to Ravenna. Some testimonies have identified her as a sporty and daring woman. She was a professional fencer during high school, even winning some regional tournaments as a foil player; she knew how to ride and was passionate about motorcycles and cars, even winning some competitions. During these years, Isotta's choice to undertake a career as a doctor matured; she explains, in an interview released in 1965, the story of how she decided to pursue a career in medicine:

One day, in an attempt to imitate the flying acrobats of the circus, I relied on two ropes secured to two poplar branches and fell upon a farmer. I rushed to the side of the poor man who showed no more signs of life. I did everything to revive him: I even gave him artificial respiration, according to the rules I had learned from the science book. Finally the farmer came to: he was stunned and in pain but he had the strength to thank me for taking care of him. Who knows, maybe at that moment I chose to become a doctor

So, Isotta enrolled in the Faculty of Medicine and Surgery of the University of Bologna, where she was a pupil of Augusto Righi and Augusto Murri. Simultaneously, in 1916, she became assistant to Riccardo Simonini in the pediatric clinic of the University of Modena. She graduated in Modena on 15 May 1917, and in 1919 she specialized in Pediatrics. In 1919, she also obtained a medical contract in Savarna and, soon after, in San Zaccaria, where she remained until 1933.

=== The Fascist period ===
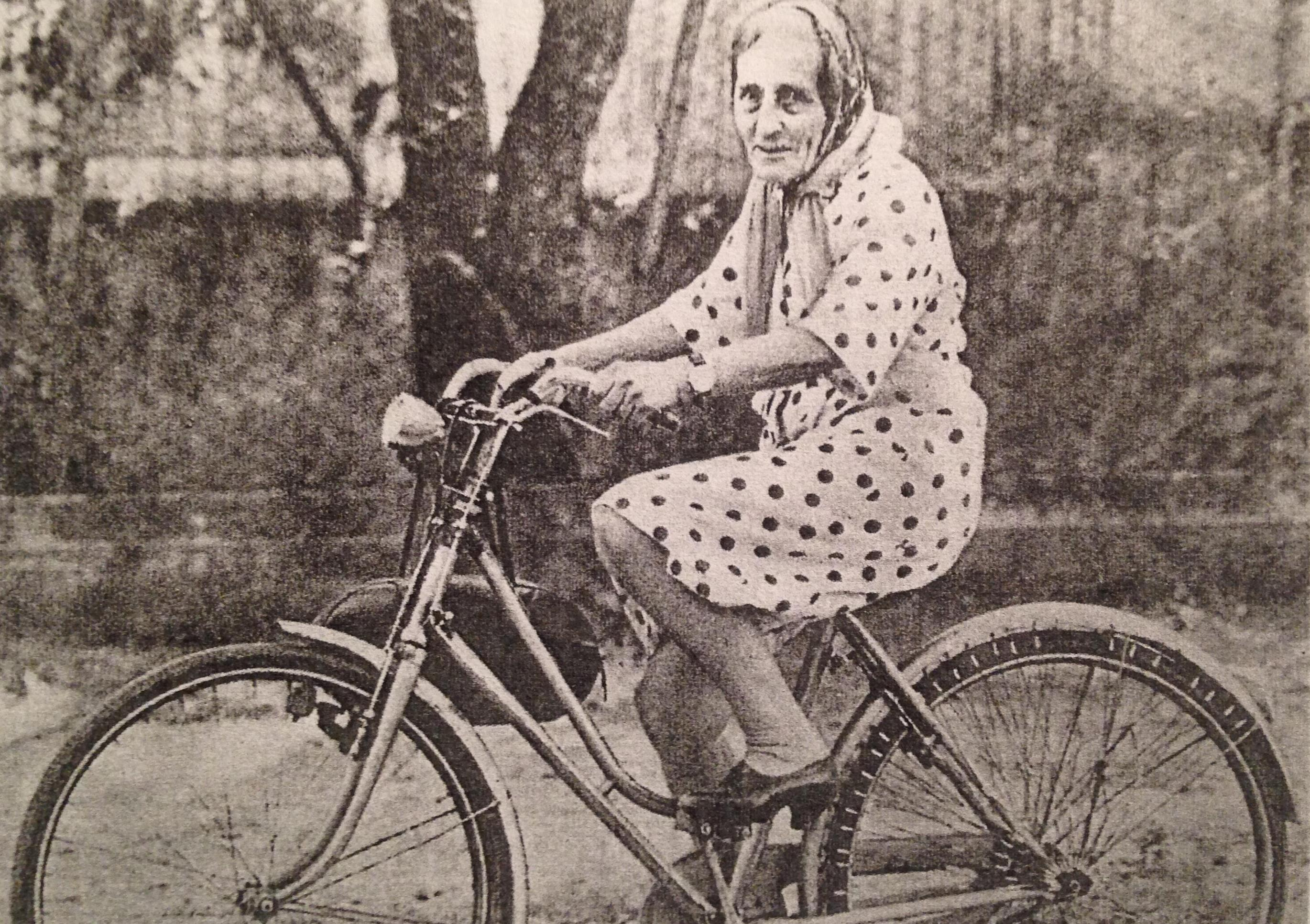
Isotta Gervasi on her bicycle

During the Fascist era, Gervasi exercised her career in medicine, which was characterized by a strong "patriarchal dominion" in which it was exclusively men who took care of the development and maintenance of the home, while women were responsible for the care of the children and the management of the house. During this time, an effort was made to remove the female figure not only from the political sphere, but also from the scholastic and working sphere. Getting out of these rigid patterns, therefore, was a real act of rebellion for a woman.

The first Italians who graduated in Medicine at the end of the nineteenth century seemed to continue their work by following the pediatric speciality, a practice that Gervasi still seemed to respect. However, after overcoming an initial embarrassment, she agreed to resume, despite the understandable difficulties, the post of doctor. Working in such a large area of the countryside, Gervasi started to travel on foot or by bicycle, then by motorbike, and then used the automobile, proving herself to be a forerunner in this field as well. In 1933, due to health problems, Isotta Gervasi abandoned the contract and continued her practice in an outpatient clinic in Ravenna for about ten years. Here, she treated some of the richest families in the region, but did not give up taking care of the poorest patients, particularly the workers of the city. During the war, she was entrusted with the conduct of Savio, where she practised primarily for free, treating displaced persons and soldiers of all nationalities. So Lina Sacchetti, her friend, says:

During the war years, when Cervia, close to the Gothic line, was transformed by the Germans into an entrenched camp against possible landings from the sea, the city became the object of daily bombing and strafing actions by allied aircraft; Isotta, armed with the bracelet of the International Red Cross, overcoming the anguish and fear, ran there, by bicycle, where her intervention was necessary, venturing everywhere among the dust, mud, snow, mines. Once she was smeared by a splinter. She visited twice a day the people of Cervia displaced in huts and affected by typhus, along the banks of the salt pans, and the fishermen of Borgomarina, knowing that neither of them nor of the others could receive compensation

For this reason, after the war in Cervia, she was appointed an official physician to the Marine Colony for children.

=== Cultural interests ===
Her diverse and numerous interests led her to connect with the intellectuals and artists of the Romagna culture. Isotta Gervasi was a frequent guest at the home of Antonio Beltramelli and the Corradini-Ginanni brothers, Arnaldo Ginna and Bruno Corra, her high school friend; she also met the popular futurist musician Francesco Balilla Pratella. Among her acquaintances are the poets Aldo Spallicci and Giuseppe Valenti, the painter Boris Georgiev, who dedicated a portrait to her and the authors Renato Serra and Calogero Tumminelli. During this time, she stayed at Terme della Fratta, where she had the opportunity to make friends with the dancer Maria Borgese and the writer Grazia Deledda. In Polenta, in 1932, on the occasion of the inauguration of the monument to Giosuè Carducci, Gervasi was introduced to Benito Mussolini, who offered her a position at the Ministry of Health, but according to sources, she declined to accept. However, this time cannot be recorded precisely because the photos, letters and books dedicated to her fellow authors, which made up her private collection, were lost during the Second World War.

Gervasi continued to live and work in Cervia until the summer of 1966. Later, she moved to Modena with her sister Liliana for the winter season, where she died on June 17, 1967, following a heart attack.

== Legacy ==
In the Cervese region, Gervasi is remembered as "doctor of the poor" and "angel on a bicycle".

=== Awards and honours ===
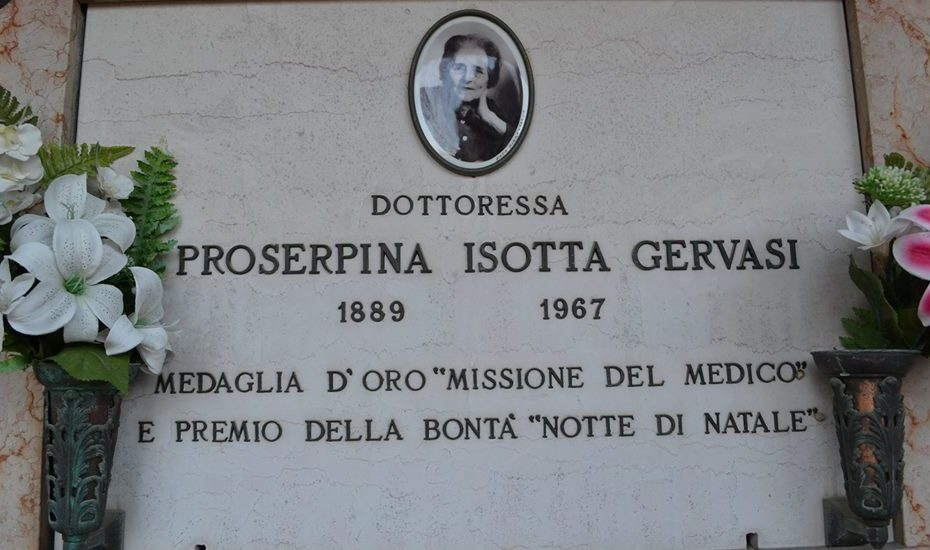
Tombstone of Isotta Gervasi located in the city of Cervia (Cervia Cemetery)

In 1963, in the city of Cervia, Gervasi was awarded the "Prize of Goodness. Christmas night" as a token of gratitude for her continuous devotion to her work. Subsequently, in 1965, she was the first woman to be honored, as a "magnificent example of altruism that highly honors the profession of the doctor" with the "Doctor's Mission Award" from the Carlo Erba Foundation. After this recognition, which gave her national fame, the Italian press began to take an interest in her figure, particularly after discovering that a female physician had been operating in Romagna since 1919. As a result, Gervasi had the cover of an issue of the Tempo Medico magazine, signed by Guido Crepax, dedicated to her. This success embarrassed her" she had always been quiet and reserved, and was almost annoyed by too much media attention.

== Relationship with Grazia Deledda ==
There are several testimonies, both from private letters and from some compositions, in which Grazia Deledda writes of Gervasi in affectionate and interested tones. The two met around 1920 at the Terme della Fratta, where the writer would stop for a few days, when she would return from Cervia. Without question, both humanly and artistically, Deledda was struck by the young woman from Cervia and the two began to spend a lot of time together. Deledda in letters to family members often spoke about the evenings spent in Gervasi's company, and about their trips by car to visit Marino Moretti and Alfredo Panzini.

It is not hard to grasp why the two women have become close friends. They were both endowed with a stubborn resilience, which allowed them to transcend the mistrust and biases of an age in which women had a marginal position in the public and professional spheres; they developed themselves in fields, although different, that were dominated by a strong male presence. Gervasi was also Grazia Deledda's doctor during her last stay in Cervia. In the short story "Happy August" first published in Corriere della Sera on August 30, 1935, and then published in the posthumous collection Il cedro del Lebano, Deledda, now seriously ill, describes a beautiful portrait of Isotta:

Here, on the other hand, the Doctor is ready: like an elderly but still sprightly archangel, she arrives dressed in white on the wings of her bicycle, and in a moment her words light up the gloomy domestic horizon. And her recipes are not expensive: "fresh and pure water" or, at most, some purgative lemonade. And if the Doctor arrives from Ravenna with her car to finish, it is almost necessary to celebrate the illness, like an ungrateful guest that we know we will have to leave in a few hours. The Doctor is beautiful, elegant; in the evening she transforms like the fairy Melusina, with her clothes and her dazzling jewels, and her eyes and teeth still more dazzling: but she is also a fairy in front of the sick bed, whether a prince or a expert care, generously gives bottles of ancient wine and chickens and flowers.

Gervasi, on the other hand, used to characterize Deledda as a woman with very vibrant and intelligent eyes and at the same time, shy and reserved, emphasizing the attributes most similar to her own character: on the one hand determination and tenacity and on the other hand sweetness and discretion. The Madesani Deledda family remained very loyal to Gervasi even after the death of Deledda, tracing her profile on the occasion of the recommendation for the Missione del Medico prize, promoted by the Carlo Erba Foundation.

== Bibliography ==
- Sacchetti Lina, "Grazia Deledda memories and testimonies" in "letter to Sardus, 30 August 1932", Minerva Italica, July 1971, pp. 203–242
- Deledda Grazia, “Happy August”, in The cedar of Lebanon, Aldo Garzanti Editore, 1939, pp. 141–143
- Gabici Franco and Toscano Fabio, Scientists of Romagna, Sironi Editore, Milan 2007, p. 326
- Sacchetti Lina, Isotta Gervasi. First female doctor led to Italy, Tip. Saporetti, Cervia 1983
- Sgarbi Carlo, "Profile of Isotta Gervasi gold medal", Missione del Medico, in Baistrocchi Ettore, Frugando… in the past, Bulzoni Editore, 1990
- Ricci Manuela and Gagliardi Elena, In the land of the wind. Grazia Deledda, Lina Sacchetti, Isotta Gervasi in Cervia, A. Longo Editore, Ravenna 1998
- Tempo Medico, VII, no. 37, September 1965
- De Carlo Antonio, "The first lady doctor led", Gente, IX, no. 23, 9 June 1965
- Deledda Grazia, "Happy August", Corriere della Sera, 30 August 1935
- Ravenna Tourism. Isotta Gervasi: La Storia Della Dottoressa in Bici Che Continua Ad Ispirare – #MyRavenna – Italian Beauty Experience. 11 Mar. 2019, www.myravenna.it/2019/03/08/isotta-gervasi/
- "Isotta Gervasi", Memory Address, 13 July 2019, 195.62.167.82/index.php/2019/07/13/isotta-gervasi/

== Related items ==
- Cervia
- Grazia Deledda
- History of medicine
- Romagna
