= Pinarella =

Coordinates: 44.2500°N 12.3667°E

- Frazione
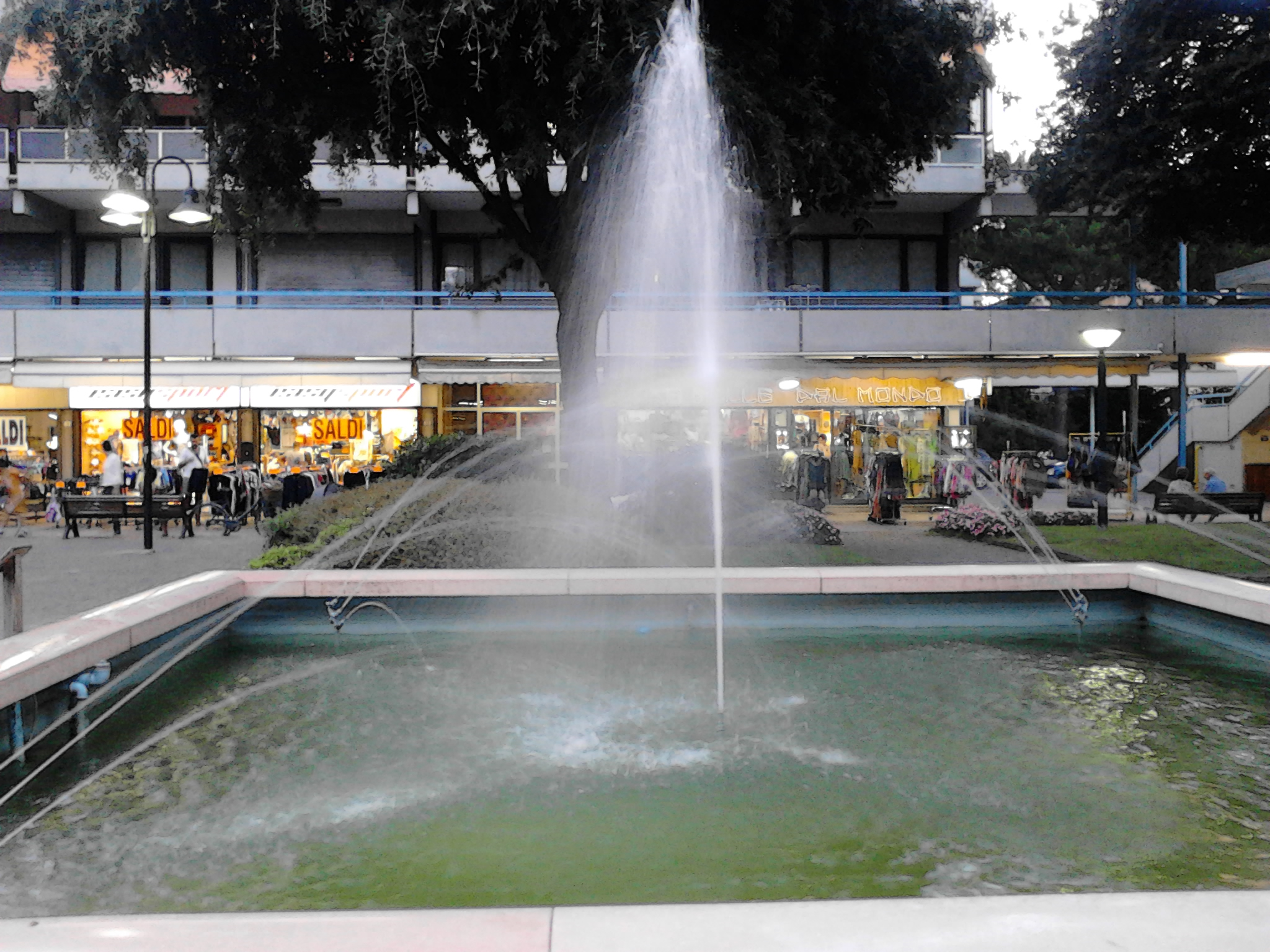
- The fountain of Piazza dell'Unità

- Location of Pinarella in Italy
- Country: Italy
- Region: Emilia-Romagna
- Province: Ravenna (RA)
- Comune: Cervia

Population
  - Total: 4,762
- Time zone: UTC+1 (CET)
  - Summer (DST): UTC+2 (CEST)
- Postal code: 48015
- Patron saint: San Paterniano

Pinarella is a frazione of the city of Cervia, Italy.

In addition to the usual hotels and stays, the Pinarella area had, as of 2004, two camping sites. The commune of Cervia markets Pinarella as a safe, child-friendly beach resort.

== Gallery ==
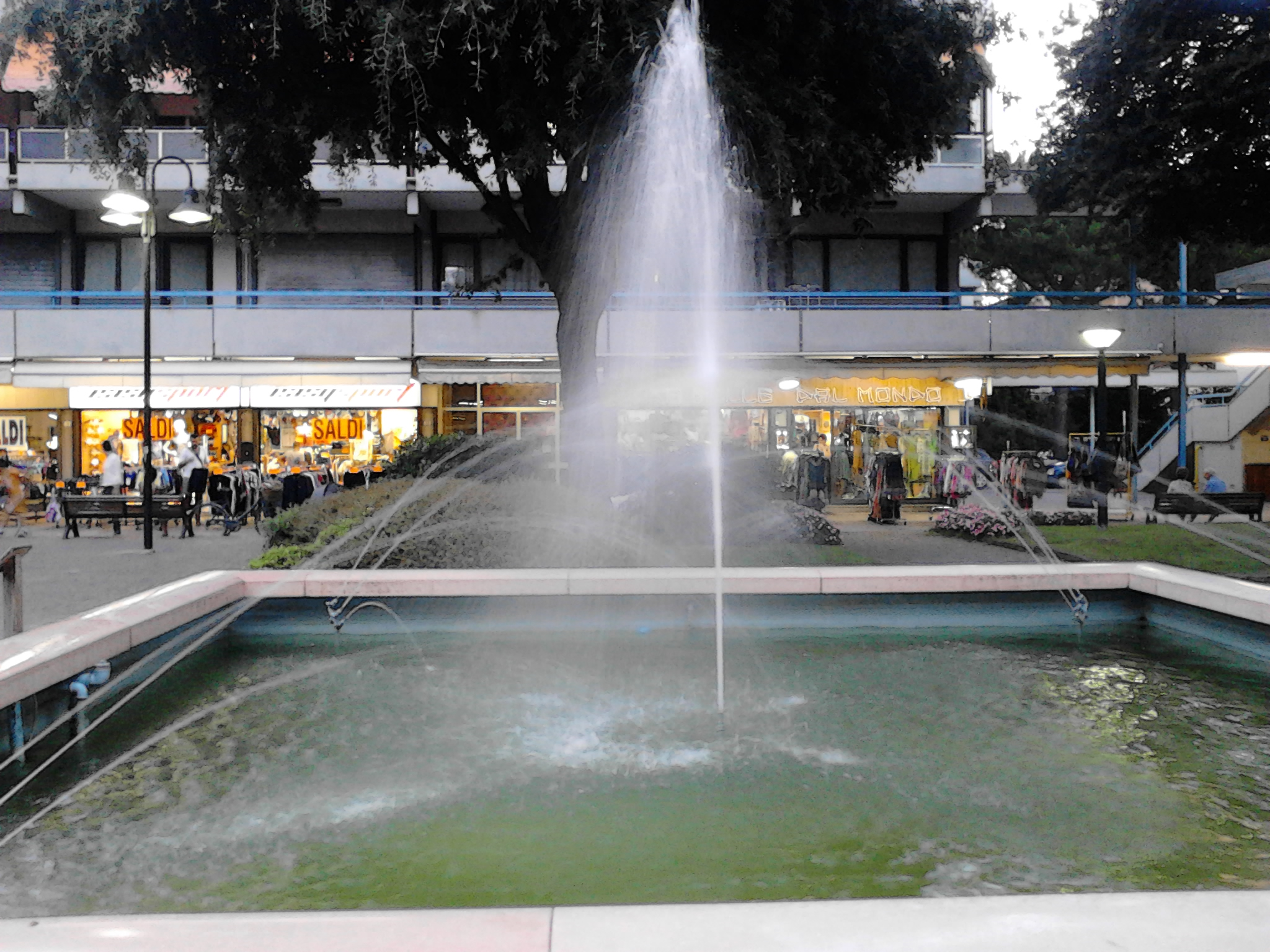
The fountain of Piazza dell'Unità

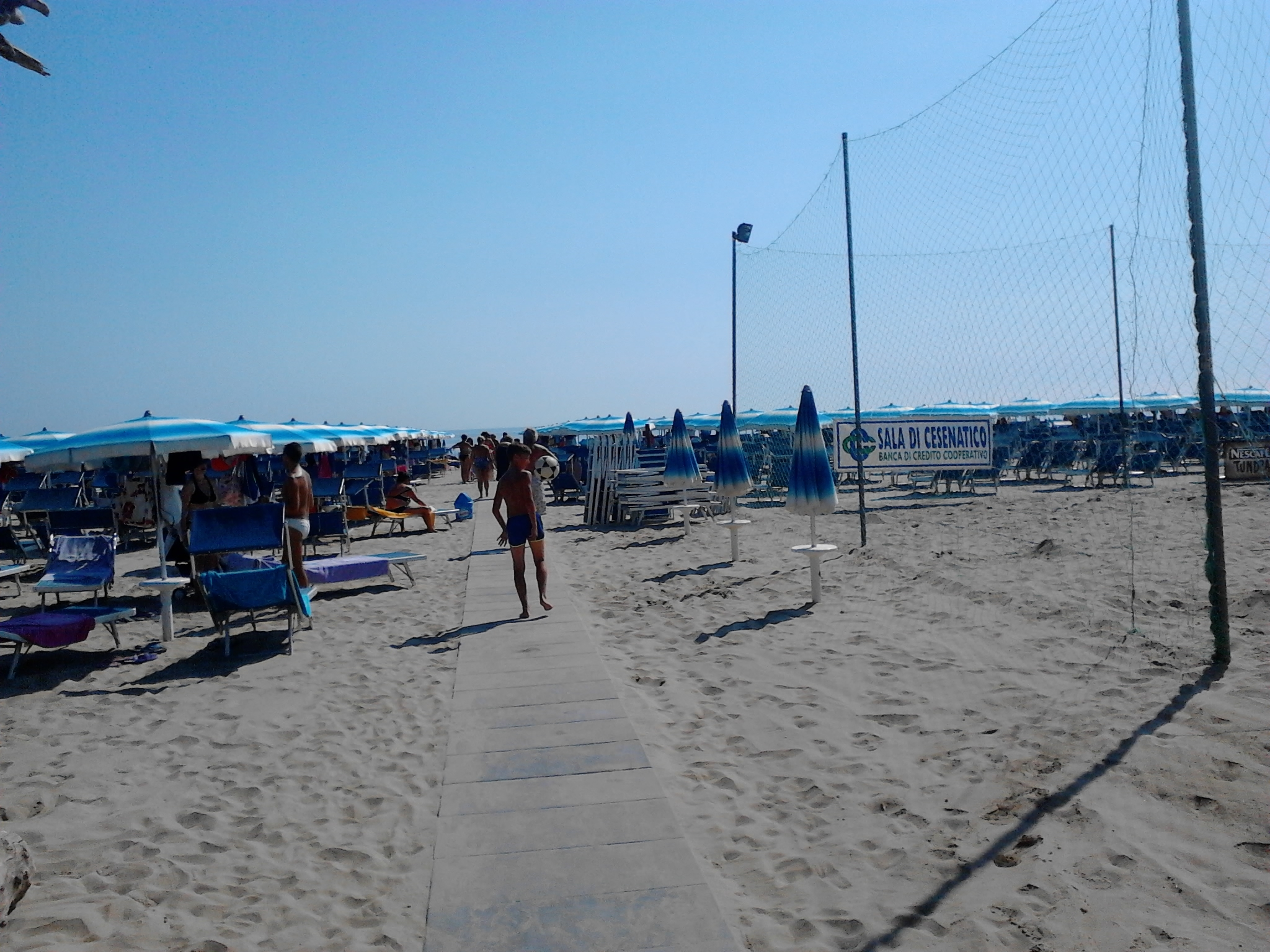
The beach
