= Isotta Brembati =

Italian poet and countess

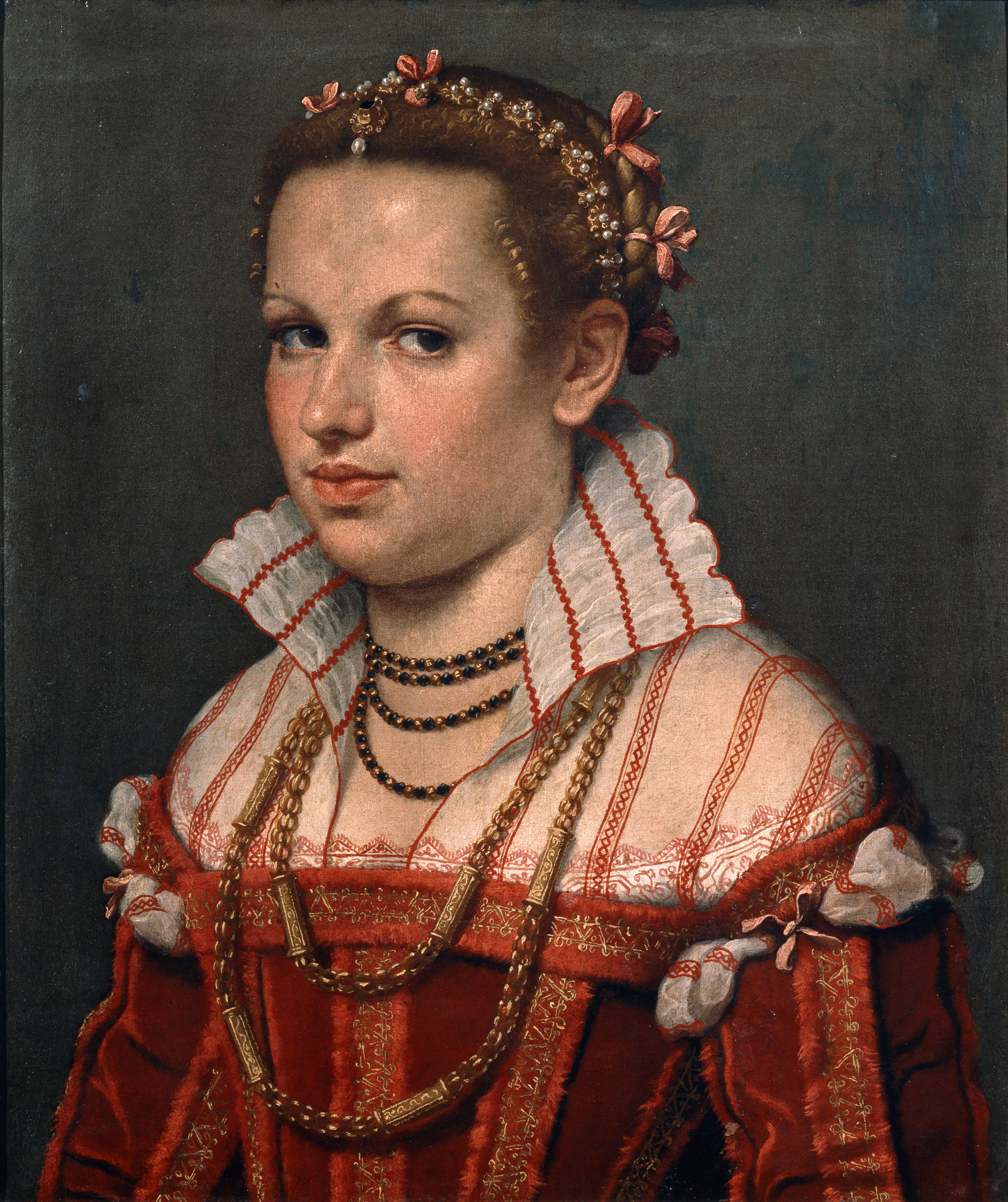
- Brembati painted by Giovanni Battista Moroni, circa 1560.
- Born: 1530; Bergamo, Italy
- Died: 24 February 1586 (aged 55–56); Bergamo, Italy

Isotta Brembati (c. 1530 – 24 February 1586), also known as Isotta Brembati Grumelli, was an Italian poet and countess.

== Biography ==
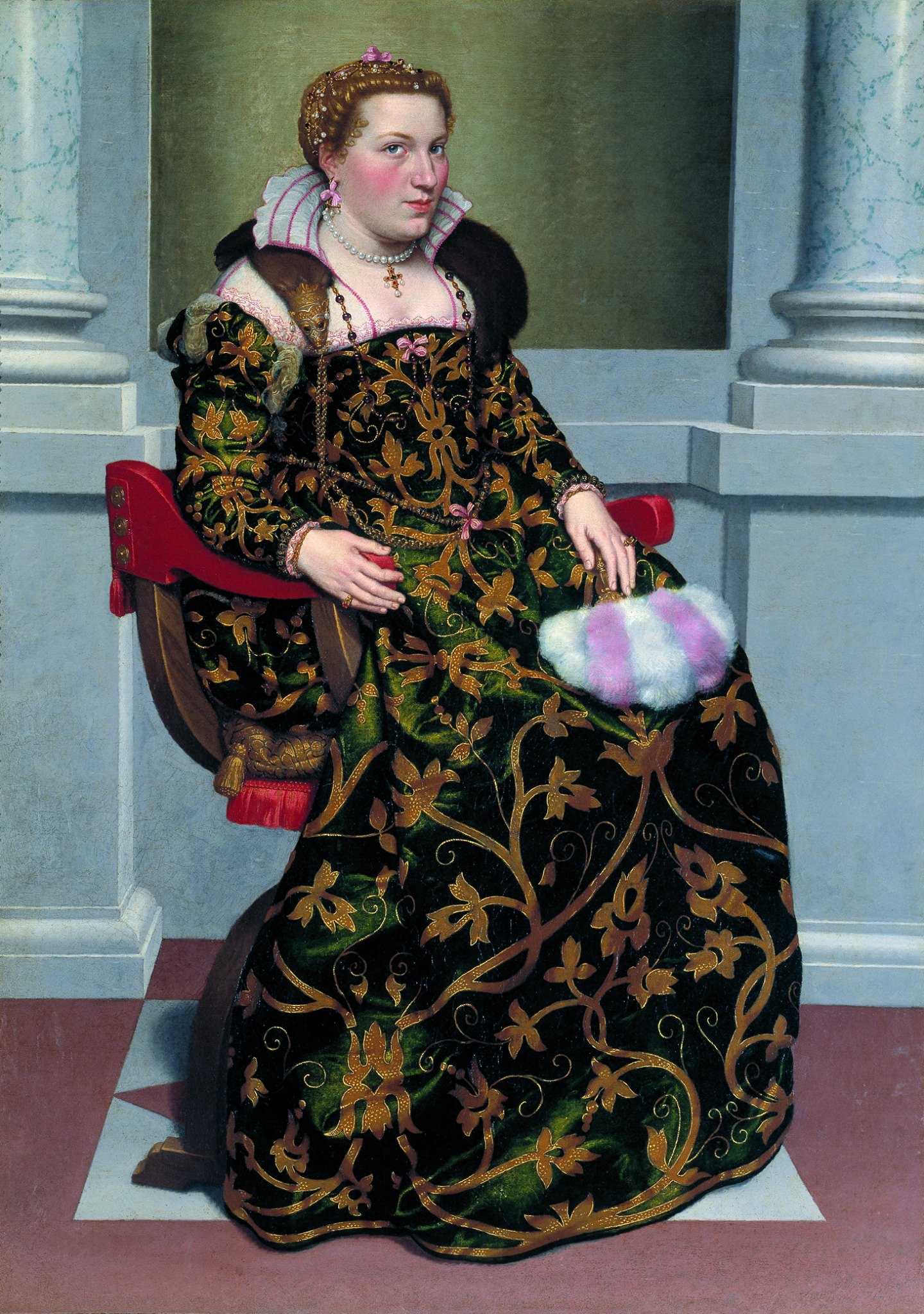
Another painting of Brembati

Born in Bergamo in 1530 to Isotta Ludovico and Lucas Brembati, Brembati was fluent in Greek, Latin, French, Spanish, and Italian. Initially married to Count Lecio Secco d'Aragona di Castro, she remarried to Gian Gerolamo Grumelli in 1561. Brembati and Grumelli gained significant local influence as a couple and were painted twice by Giovanni Battista Moroni.

== Legacy ==
Brembati gained widespread acclaim for her poetry. After her death in 1586, a book of poems titled Rime funerali di diversi illustri ingegni composte in volgare et latina favella in morte della molto illustre signora Isotta Brembati-Grumelli was published to commemorate her.
