= Anziani =

Anziani may refer to:

== People ==
- Alain Anziani (1951–2025), French politician
- Baptiste Anziani (born 1990), French football player
- Giacomo Anziani (1681–1723), Italian architect, painter, and engraver
- Julien Anziani (born 1999), French football player
- Philippe Anziani (born 1961), French football player and manager

== Other uses ==
- Palazzo degli Anziani, Pistoia, a palace in Pistoia, Tuscany, Italy
