= Spreti =

Spreti is an Italian surname. Notable people with the surname include:

- Cajetan Graf von Spreti (1905–1989), member of a German noble family who joined the Nazi Party
- Camillo Spreti (1743–1830), Italian marquis and writer from Ravenna
- Carolina Spreti (born 1999), known professionally as Caro Wow, Italian singer-songwriter
- Desiderio Spreti (1414–1474), Italian historian of contemporary Ravenna
- Karl von Spreti (1907–1970), German diplomat
- Pomponio Spreti (1595–1652), Roman Catholic prelate who served as Bishop of Cervia (1646–1652)
- Vittorio Spreti (1887–1950), Italian historian of the nobility of Italy
