= Camillo Spreti =

Italian marquis and writer

Camillo Spreti (14 February 1743 – 1830) was an Italian marquis and writer from Ravenna, who documented the history of monuments of his native city.

== Biography ==
He was born in Ravenna to his father the Marchese Giulio Spreti. Camillo is almost certainly related to another Camillo Spreti, who served as Archbishop of Cervia from 15 April 1709 till his death in January 1727.

Camillo's was orphaned at a young age, and after studying in Modena, he joined the Order of Knights of the Hospital of Saint John of Jerusalem, commonly known as the Knights Hospitaller. He spent twenty years with the order in Malta, where the order provided security for Christian merchant caravans across the Mediterranean. He was in Ravenna during the Napoleonic era, briefly offered positions with either the tenuous Austrian or Papal-backed governments of this era. He mostly refused the offers, however, he welcomed the return of Pope Pius VII to Italy, hosting the pope at his palace on 16 April 1814.

He reprinted works by local writers such as the 15th-century historian Desiderio Spreti. In 1804, he also described the early Christian mosaics of Ravenna, work which help spur their protection. He wrote a history of the Society of Casamatta, an ancient local fisherman's guild. 194, 197

Among his works are:

- Riflessioni civili e morali dell"abate de Bellegard sopra cio che puo piacere o dispiacere nel commercio del mondo, esposte in sei dialoghi e transportate dall"idioma francese nell"italiana favella (Faenza, 1787)
- Desiderii Spreti historici ravennatis de amplitudine, eversione et restauratione urbis Ravennae libri II
- Agli amatori delle cose georgiche, (Florence, 1802)
- Compendio storico dell'arte di comporre i musaici (Ravenna, 1804)
- Elogio de Lorenzo Fusconi ravennate (Lugo, 1819)
- Memorie intorno i dominii e governi della citta di Ravenna (Faenza, 1822)
