= Patrizio Ravennate =

Patrizio Ravennate (Latin: Patricius Ravennas) was a chronicler of Ravenna active in the late 14th century and possibly into the early 15th.

Virtually nothing is known of his life, although he is usually presumed to have been a native of Ravenna. The only thing that can be said for certain about his dates is that he was alive after 1378, when his chronicle ends. If he died shortly after completing his chronicle, he was probably born between about 1310 and 1330. He may have been educated at the University of Bologna.

Patricius' Cronica covers the period 1000–1378. It is essentially regional in focus. His sources include Pietro Cantinelli, Riccobaldo da Ferrara and a lost Bolognese source. For later years he includes personal experience. The Cronica is preserved complete in a single 15th-century manuscript, now Modena, Biblioteca Estense, Camp. App. 416 (= γ. R.2.35). An incomplete copy, containing only the years 1106–1276, is found in a 15th-century manuscript in Ravenna, Biblioteca Classense, Vol. miscellaneo, Mob.3.5. M/12.

== Bibliography ==
- Damian-Grint, Peter (2010). "Patricius Ravennas". In Graeme Dunphy (ed.). Encyclopedia of the Medieval Chronicle. Vol. 2. Brill. p. 1190. doi:10.1163/2213-2139_emc_SIM_02013.
- Mascanzoni, Leardo (2014). "Patrizio Ravennate". Dizionario Biografico degli Italiani (in Italian). Vol. 81: Pansini–Pazienza. Rome: Istituto dell'Enciclopedia Italiana. ISBN 978-88-12-00032-6.
- Mascanzoni, Leardo, ed. (2015). Patricii Ravennatis Cronica. Istituto Istorico Italiano.
