= Sant'Eufemia, Ravenna =

Settlement in the Italian municipality of Brisighella

Coordinates: 44.1706°N 11.6904°E

Sant'Eufemia is a Roman Catholic church located on Via Barbiani in Ravenna, region of Emilia Romagna, Italy.

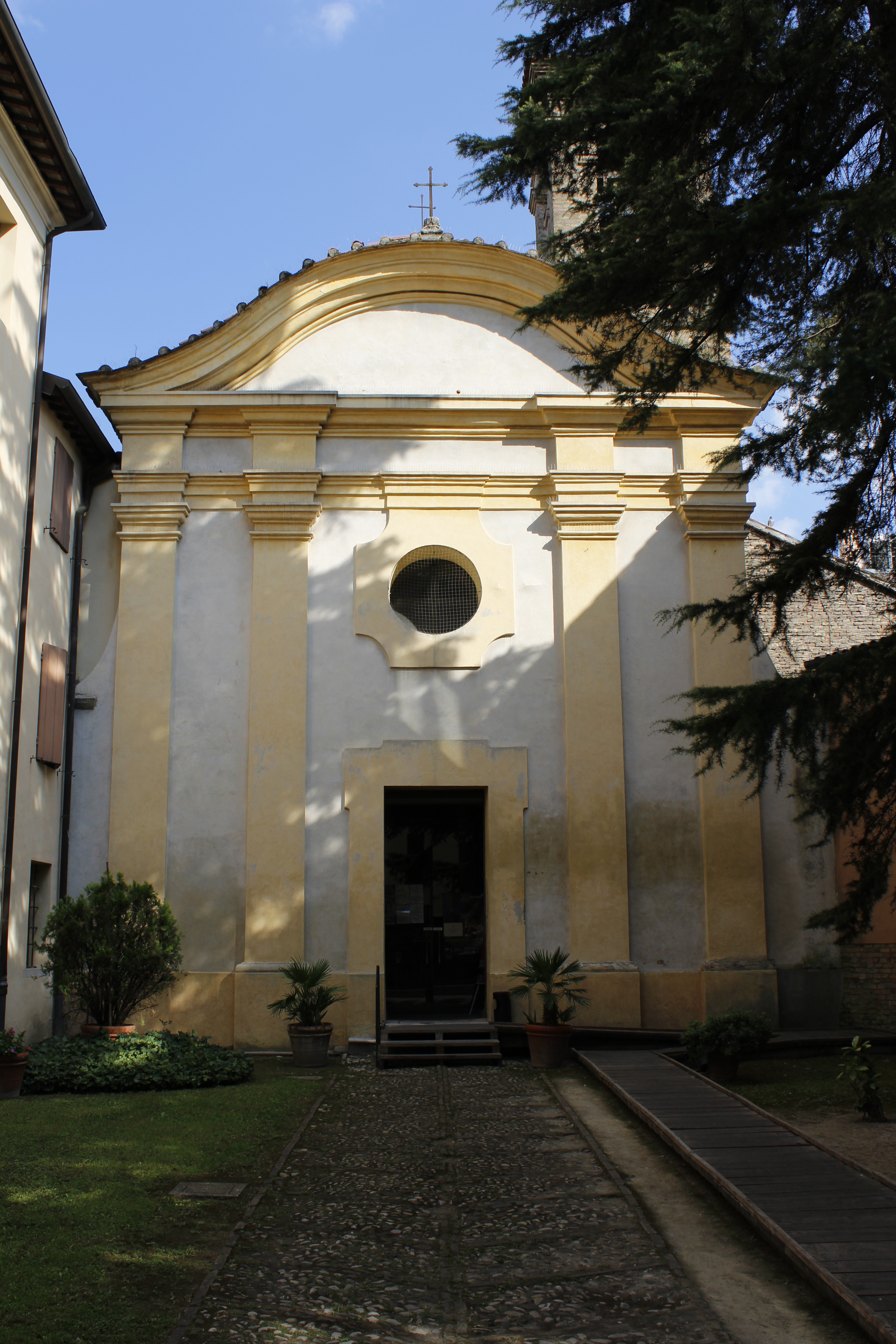
Facade of the church

The church was designed by Giovan Francesco Buonamici, and erected between 1742 and 1747 upon the foundations of a palaeo-Christian temple. The central design recalls some of the ancient churches in town. The building, now deconsecrated, with three altars now represents the entrance of the archaeological site Domus dei Tappeti di Pietra, which houses the mosaic floors of a Byzantine-era palace.
