= San Giovanni Battista, Ravenna =

Baroque church in Ravenna, Italy

Coordinates: 44.420571°N 12.201240°E

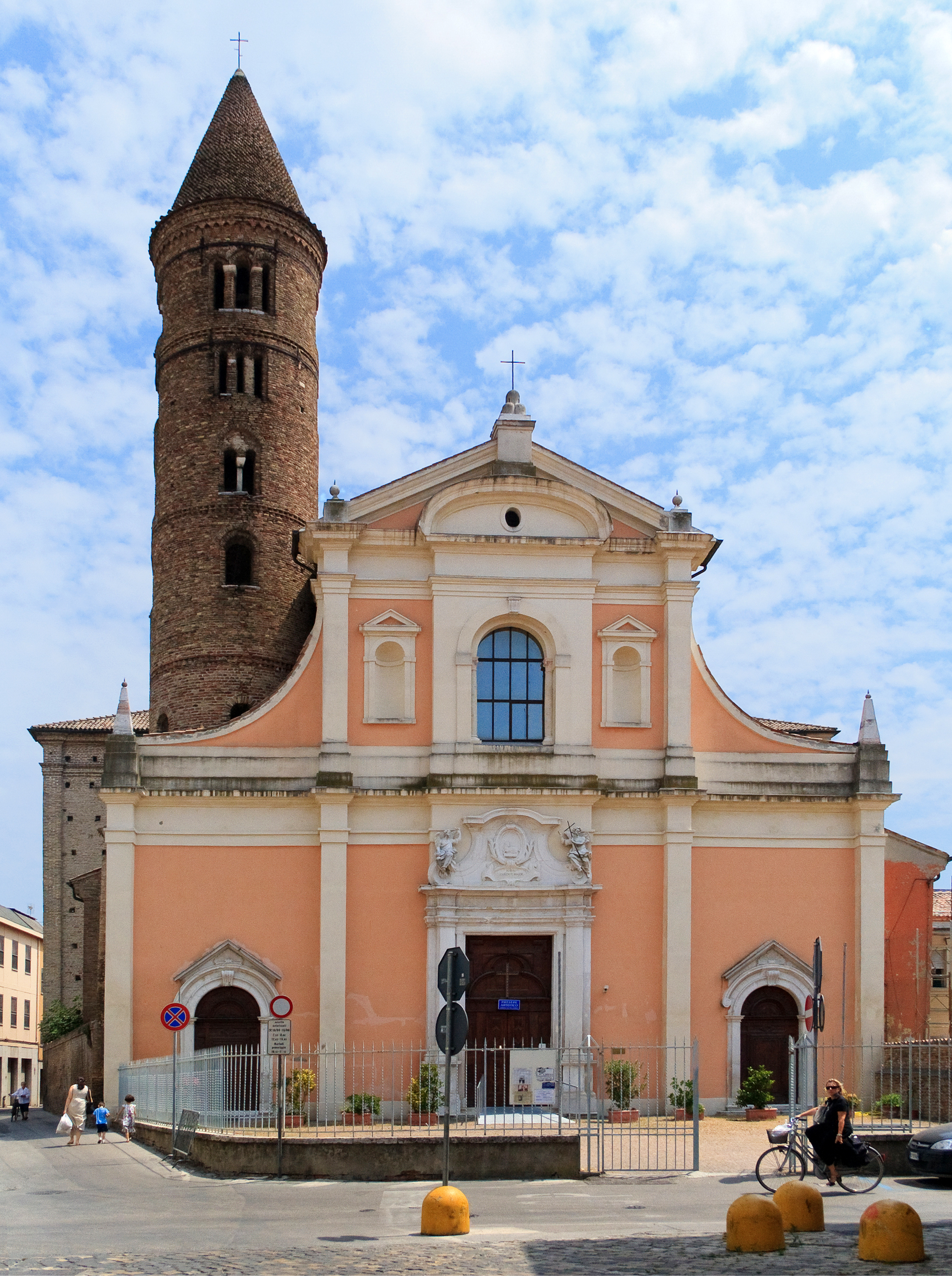
The facade of the church and the bell-tower

San Giovanni Battista is a baroque church in the historic center of Ravenna, Italy, built in 1689 by Pietro Grossi.

The church here, a three-nave basilica, was built in the 6th century. In 1688, it was strongly damaged by an earthquake, demolished, and a new building was constructed in the same place. Parts of the apse of the old building survived, as well as the bell-tower built in the 9th-10th centuries.
