= Ravenna =

City in Emilia-Romagna, Italy

Ravenna Ravèna / Ravêna (Romagnol)
- Comune
- Comune di Ravenna
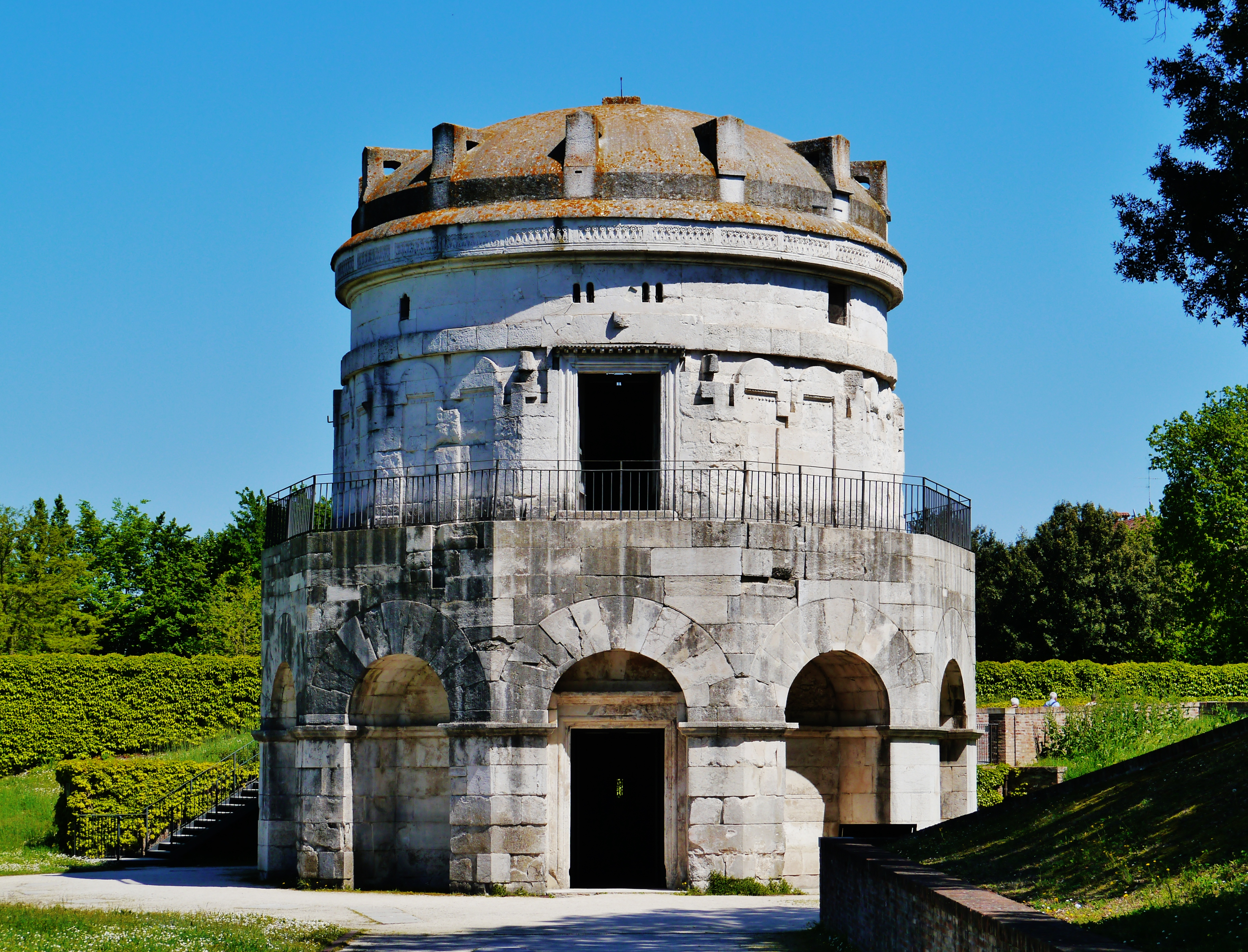
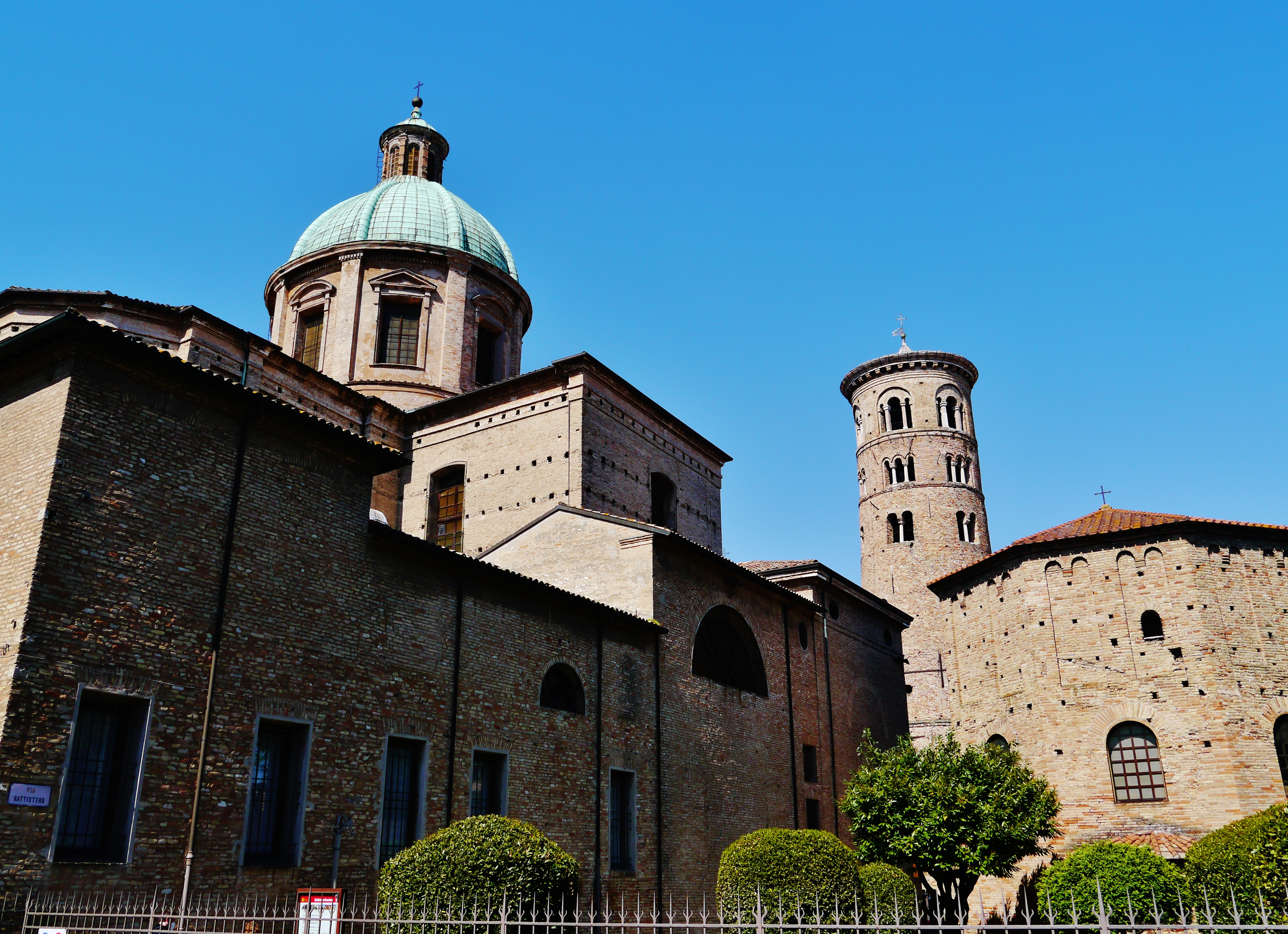
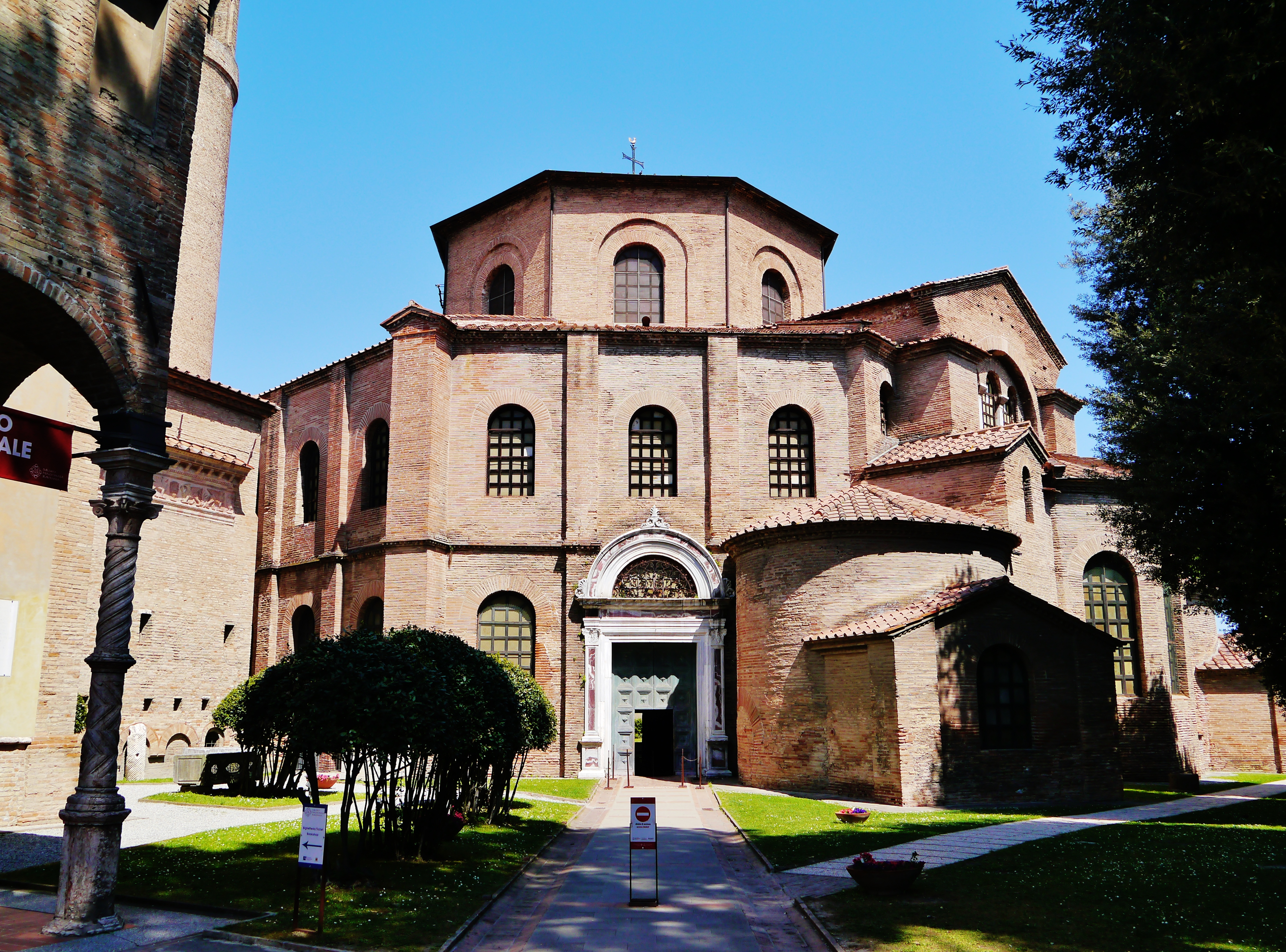
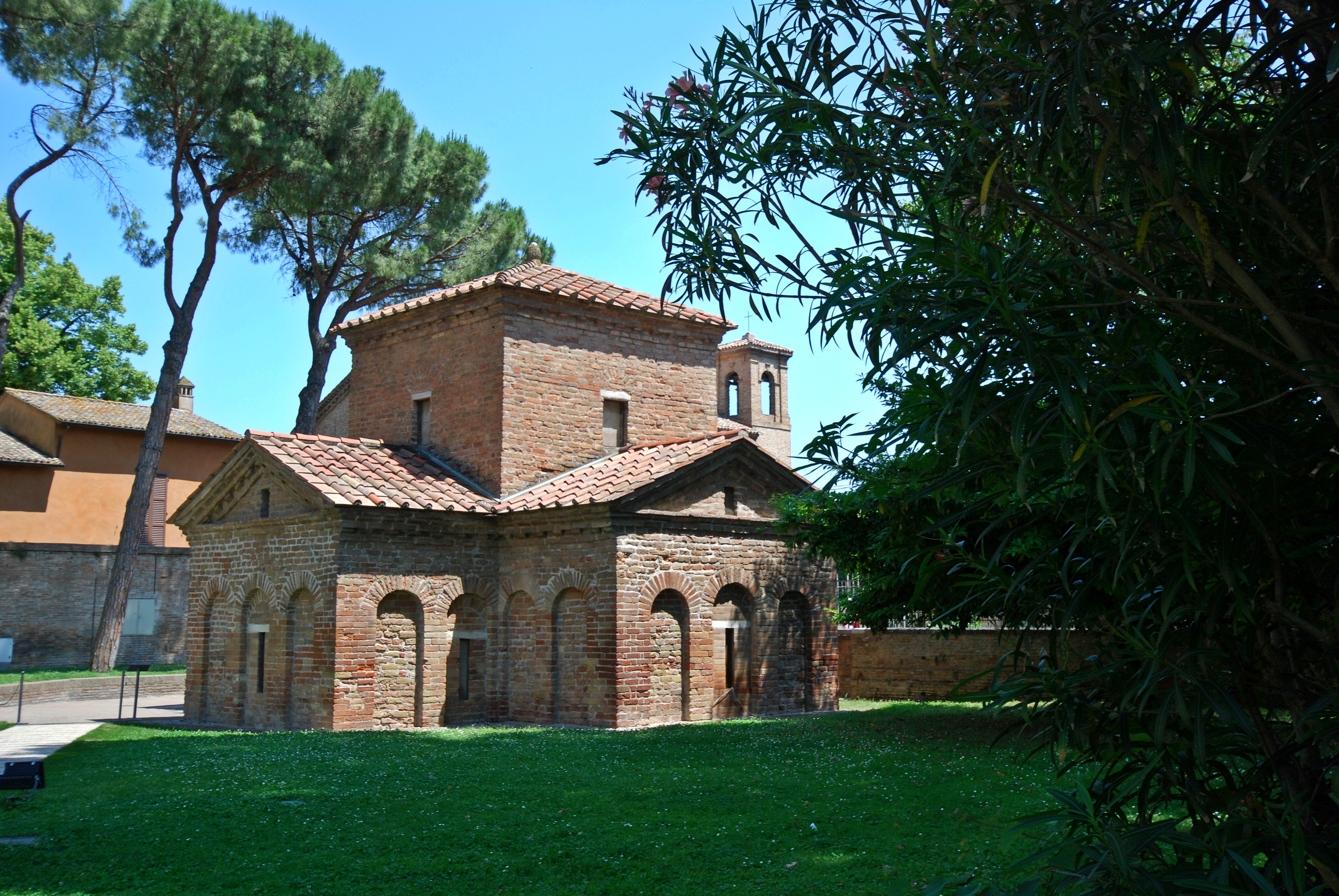
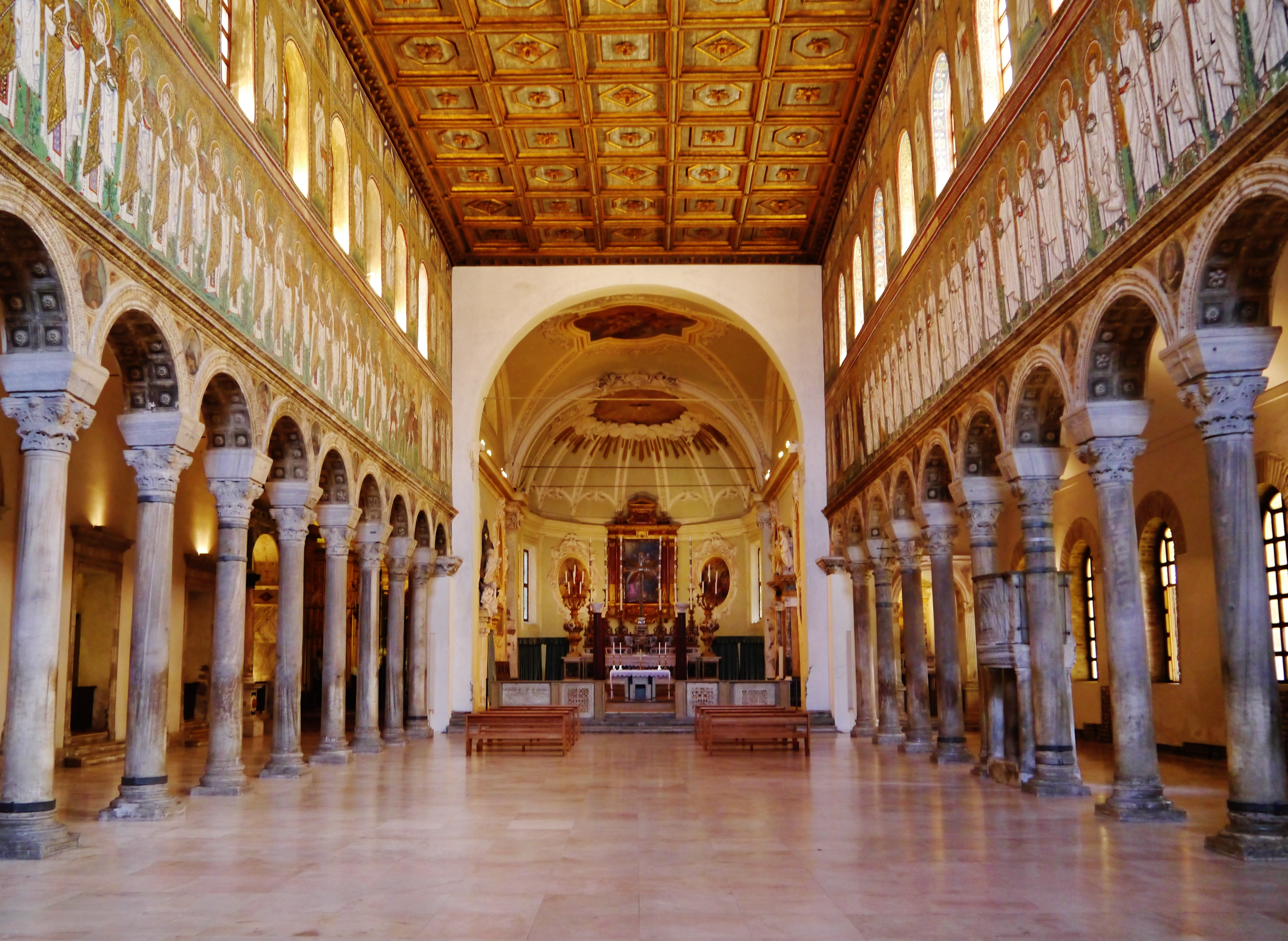
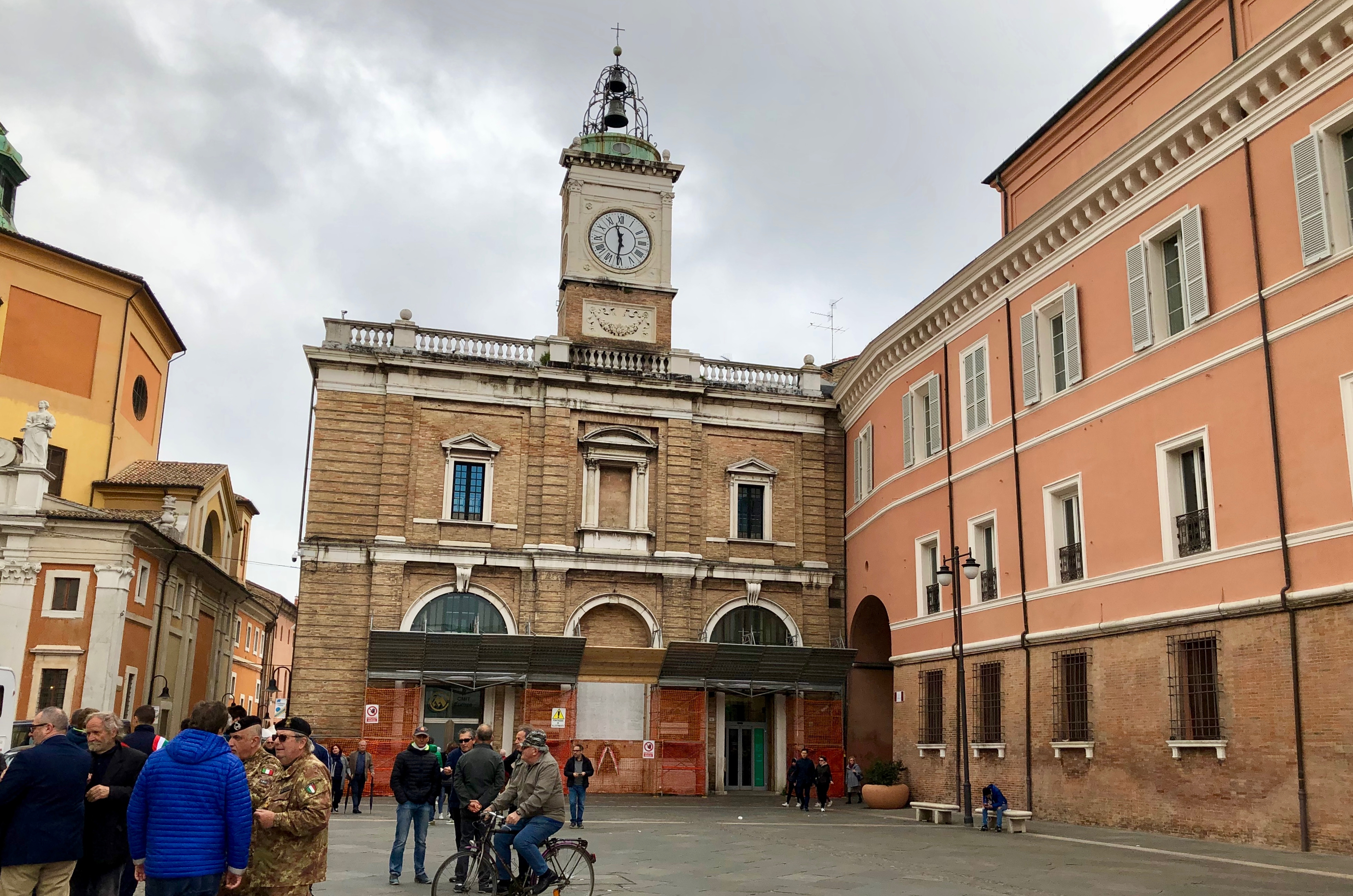
- Theodoric Mausoleum Ravenna Cathedral Basilica of San Vitale Mausoleum of Galla Placidia Basilica of Sant'Apollinare Nuovo Piazza del Popolo

- Flag Coat of arms

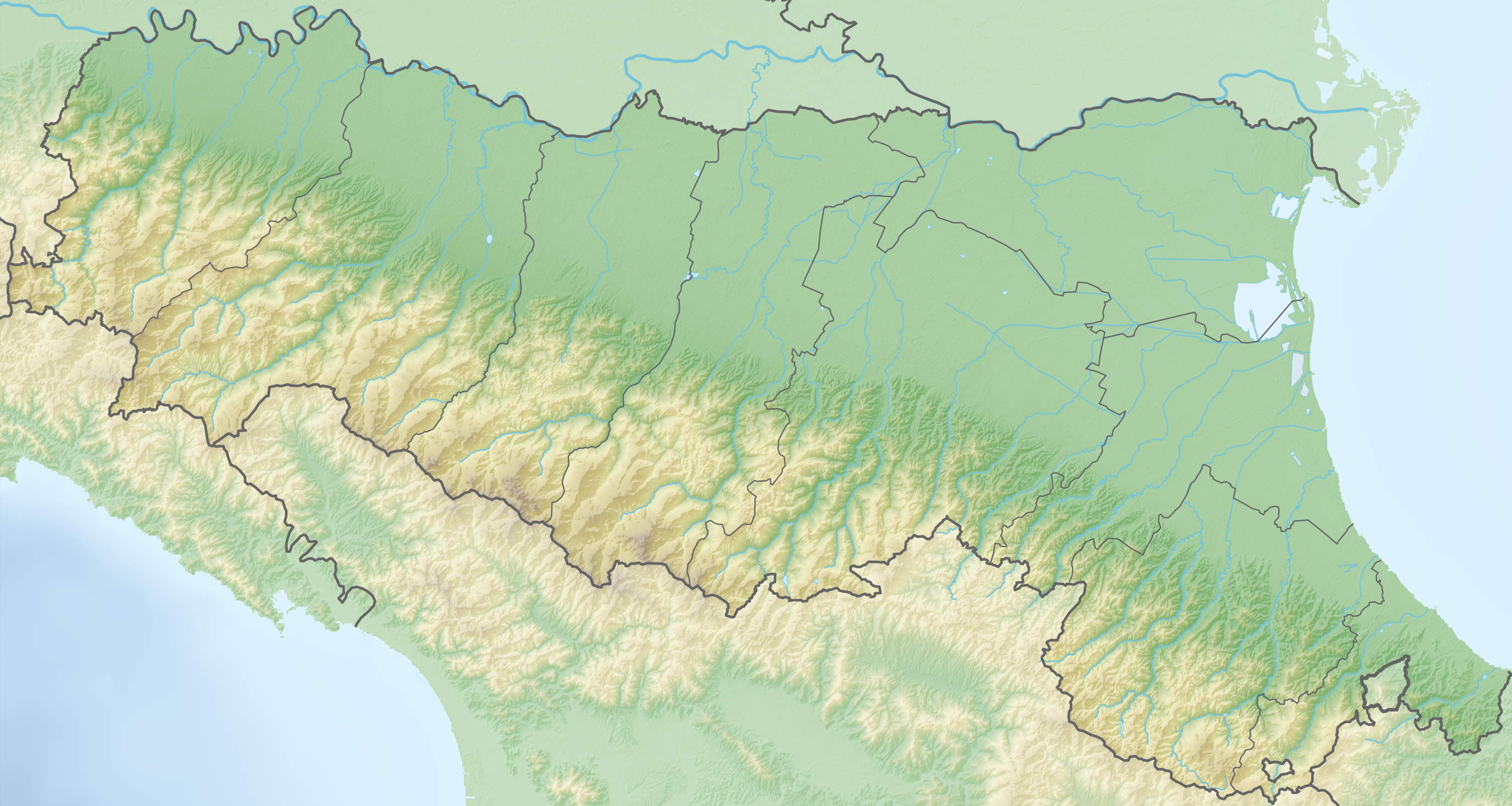
- Location within Emilia-Romagna Location within Italy Location within Europe
- Coordinates: 44°24′58″N 12°12′06″E
- Country: Italy
- Region: Emilia-Romagna
- Province: Ravenna (RA)
- Founded: circa 500 BC
- Frazioni: (subdivisions): Casalborsetti, Lido di Savio, Lido di Classe, Lido di Dante, Lido Adriano, Marina di Ravenna, Punta Marina Terme, Porto Corsini, Porto Fuori, Marina Romea, Ammonite, Camerlona, Mandriole, Savarna, Grattacoppa, Conventello, Torri, Mezzano, Sant'Antonio, San Romualdo, Sant'Alberto, Borgo Montone, Fornace Zarattini, Piangipane, San Marco, San Michele, Santerno, Villanova di Ravenna, Borgo Sisa, Bastia, Borgo Faina, Carraie, Campiano, Casemurate, Caserma, Castiglione di Ravenna, Classe, Coccolia, Ducenta, Durazzano, Filetto, Fosso Ghiaia, Gambellara, Ghibullo, Longana, Madonna dell'Albero, Massa Castello, Mensa Matellica, Osteria, Pilastro, Roncalceci, Ragone, Santo Stefano, San Bartolo, San Zaccaria, Savio, S. Pietro in Trento, San Pietro in Vincoli, San Pietro in Campiano

Government
  - Mayor: Alessandro Barattoni (PD)

Area
  - Total: 653.82 km^{2} (252.44 sq mi)
- Elevation: 4 m (13 ft)

Population (2026)
  - Total: 156,475
  - Density: 239.32/km^{2} (619.85/sq mi)
- Demonym(s): Ravennate, Ravennese
- Time zone: UTC+1 (CET)
  - Summer (DST): UTC+2 (CEST)
- Postal code: 48100
- Dialing code: 0544
- Patron saint: Saint Apollinaris
- Saint day: 23 July
- Website: Official website

Early Christian Monuments of Ravenna
UNESCO World Heritage Site
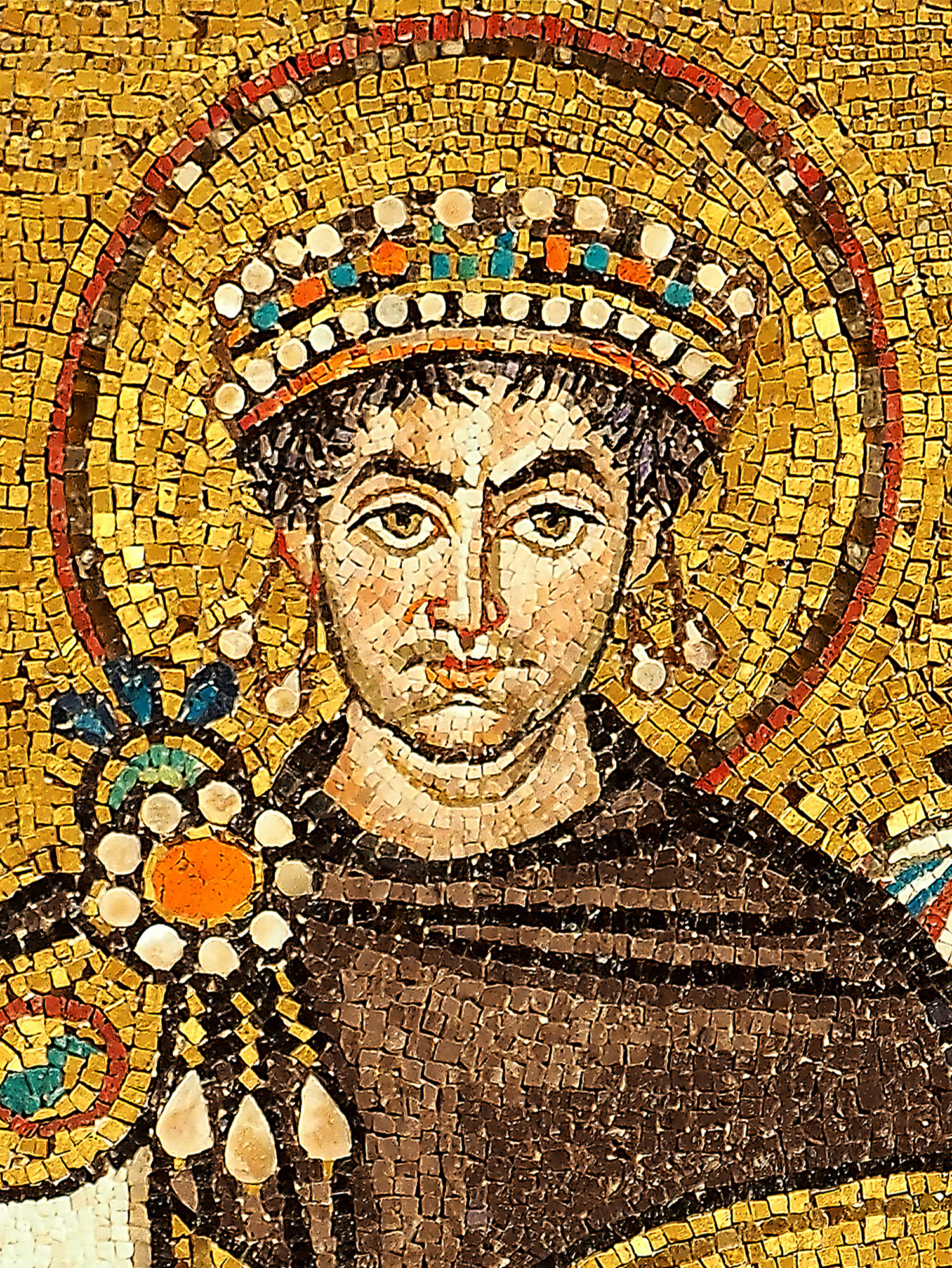
- Mosaic of the Emperor Justinian I from the Basilica of San Vitale, Ravenna
- Interactive map of Early Christian Monuments of Ravenna
- Criteria: Cultural: i, ii, iii, iv
- Reference: 788
- Inscription: 1996 (20th Session)
- Area: 1.32 ha (3.3 acres)

Ravenna (/rəˈvɛnə/ rə-VEN-ə; Italian: [raˈvenna], also locally [raˈvɛn(n)a]; Romagnol: Ravèna, Ravêna) is the capital city of the Province of Ravenna, in the Emilia-Romagna region of Northern Italy. It was the capital city of the Western Roman Empire during the fifth century AD until its collapse in 476, after which it served as the capital of the Ostrogothic Kingdom and then the Byzantine Exarchate of Ravenna. With a population of 156,475 inhabitants as of 2026, it is the 24th-largest city in Italy. Ravenna is also the second largest city in Italy by area with 653.82 km^{2}.

Initially settled by the Umbri people, Ravenna came under Roman Republic control in 89 BC. Octavian built the military harbor of Classis at Ravenna, and the city remained an important seaport on the Adriatic until the early Middle Ages. The city prospered under imperial rule. In 401, Western Roman emperor Honorius moved his court from Mediolanum to Ravenna; it then served as capital of the empire for most of the 5th century.

After the fall of the Western Roman Empire, Ravenna became the capital of Odoacer until he was defeated by the Ostrogoth king Theodoric. In 540, Belisarius conquered Ravenna for the Byzantine Empire, and the city became the capital of Byzantine Italy. After a brief Lombard control, Ravenna came under the authority of the Papacy and, save for minor interruptions, remained part of the Papal States until the mid-19th century when it was incorporated into the newly unified Kingdom of Italy.

Although it is an inland city, Ravenna is connected to the Adriatic Sea by the Candiano Canal. It is known for its well-preserved late Roman and Byzantine architecture, with eight buildings comprising the UNESCO World Heritage Site "Early Christian Monuments of Ravenna". Because of the high concentration of mosaics, the city has been associated with workshops and schools teaching mosaics, and is often given titles like the "capital of mosaics".

== History ==
The origin of the name Ravenna is unclear. Some have speculated that "Ravenna" is related to "Rasenna" (or "Rasna"), the term that the pre-Roman Etruscans used for themselves, but there is no agreement on this point.

=== Ancient era ===
The physical establishment of the city is also uncertain. The oldest archaeological evidence found dates the Umbri presence in Ravenna at least to the 5th century BC. It was undisturbed until the 3rd century BC, when it first made contact with Rome; both groups are of early Italic origin after the Indo-European wave arrived on the peninsula. Its territory was settled also by the Celtic Senones, especially the southern countryside of the city unconnected to the lagoon. This would later form a part of the Ager Decimanus or Roman public land. Ravenna consisted of houses built on piles on a series of small islands in a marshy lagoon, a situation similar to Venice several centuries later. The Romans ignored it during their conquest of the Po River Delta, but later accepted it into the Roman Republic as a federated town in 89 BC.

The city was pivotal in the move from republic to empire and later military campaigns. In 49 BC, Julius Caesar gathered his forces at Ravenna before crossing the Rubicon. Later, Octavian, after his battle against Mark Antony in 31 BC, founded the military harbor of Classis. This harbor, protected at first by its own walls, was an important station of the Roman Imperial Fleet. Nowadays, the city is landlocked, but Ravenna remained an important seaport on the Adriatic until the early Middle Ages. During the Germanic campaigns, Thusnelda, widow of Arminius, and Marbod, King of the Marcomanni, were confined at Ravenna.

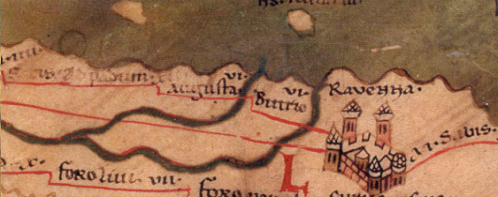
The city of Ravenna in the 4th century as shown on the Peutinger Map

Ravenna greatly prospered under Roman rule. Emperor Trajan built a 70 km (43.50 mi) long aqueduct at the beginning of the 2nd century. During the Marcomannic Wars, Germanic settlers in Ravenna revolted and seized the city. For this reason, Marcus Aurelius decided not only against bringing more barbarians into Italy, but even banished those who had previously been brought there. In 402, Emperor Honorius took up residence of the city and it became the de facto capital of the Western Roman Empire; it served as the capital for most of the 5th century and the last de facto western emperor Romulus Augustulus was deposed there in AD 476. At that time, it was home to 50,000 people. The transfer was made partly for defensive purposes: Ravenna was surrounded by swamps and marshes, and was perceived to be easily defensible (although in fact the city fell to opposing forces numerous times in its history); it is also likely that the move to Ravenna was due to the city's port and good sea-borne connections to the Eastern Roman Empire. In 409, King Alaric I of the Visigoths simply bypassed Ravenna, and went on to sack Rome in 410 and to take Galla Placidia, daughter of Emperor Theodosius I, hostage.

After many vicissitudes, Galla Placidia returned to Ravenna with her son, Emperor Valentinian III, due to the support of her nephew Theodosius II. Ravenna enjoyed a period of peace, during which time the imperial court favoured the Christian religion. The city gained some of its most famous monuments, including the Orthodox Baptistry, the misnamed Mausoleum of Galla Placidia (she was not actually buried there), and San Giovanni Evangelista.

=== Ostrogothic Kingdom ===
The late 5th century saw the dissolution of Roman authority in the west, and Romulus Augustulus was deposed in 476 by the general Odoacer. Odoacer ruled as King of Italy for 13 years, but in 489 the Eastern Emperor Zeno sent the Ostrogoth King Theodoric the Great to re-take the Italian peninsula. After losing the Battle of Verona, Odoacer retreated to Ravenna, where he withstood a siege of four years by Theodoric, until the taking of Rimini deprived Ravenna of supplies. Theodoric took Ravenna in 493, supposedly slaying Odoacer with his own hands, and Ravenna became the capital of the Ostrogothic Kingdom of Italy. Theodoric, following his imperial predecessors, also built many splendid buildings in and around Ravenna, including his palace church Sant'Apollinare Nuovo, an Arian cathedral (now Santo Spirito) and Baptistery, and his own Mausoleum just outside the walls.

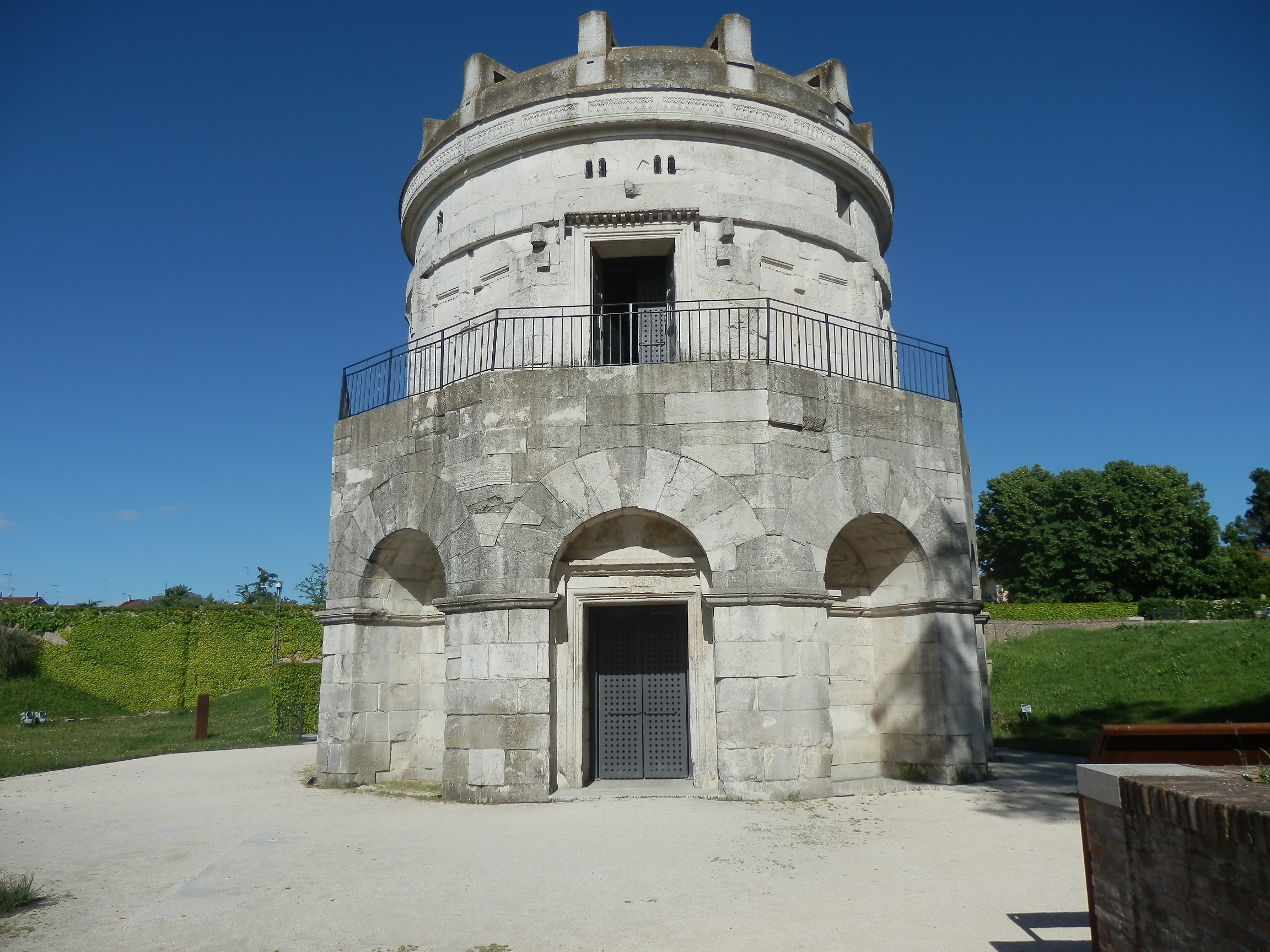
The Mausoleum of Theodoric

Both Odoacer and Theodoric and their followers were Arian Christians, but co-existed peacefully with the Latins, who were largely Nicene. Ravenna's Nicene bishops carried out notable building projects, of which the sole surviving one is the Cappella Arcivescovile. Theodoric allowed Roman citizens within his kingdom to be subject to Roman law and the Roman judicial system. The Goths, meanwhile, lived under their own laws and customs. In 519, when a mob had burned down the synagogues of Ravenna, Theodoric ordered the town to rebuild them at its own expense.

Theodoric died in 526 and was succeeded by his young grandson Athalaric under the authority of his daughter Amalasuintha, but by 535 both were dead and Theodoric's line was represented only by Amalasuntha's daughter Mataswintha. Various Ostrogothic military leaders took the Kingdom of Italy, but none were as successful as Theodoric had been. Meanwhile, the Chalcedonian Byzantine Emperor Justinian I opposed both Ostrogoth rule and the Gothic variety of Christianity. In 535 his general Belisarius invaded Italy and in 540 conquered Ravenna. After the conquest of Italy was completed in 554, Ravenna became the seat of Byzantine government in Italy.

From 540 to 600, Ravenna's bishops embarked upon a notable building program of churches in Ravenna and in and around the port city of Classe. Surviving monuments include the Basilica of San Vitale and the Basilica of Sant'Apollinare in Classe, as well as the partially surviving San Michele in Africisco.

=== Exarchate of Ravenna ===
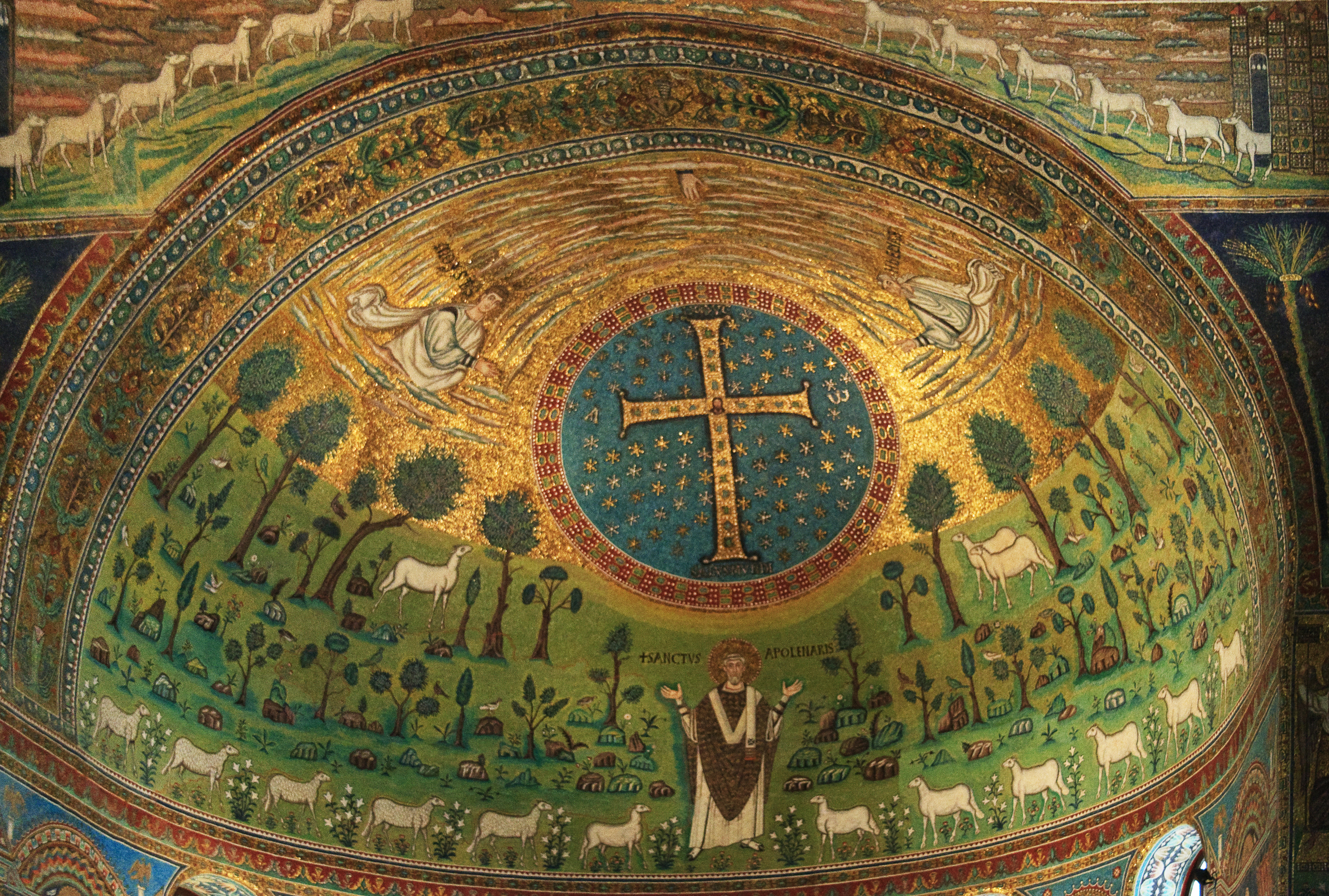
Transfiguration of Jesus. Allegorical image with Crux gemmata and lambs represent apostles, 533–549, apse of Basilica of Sant'Apollinare in Classe.

Following the conquests of Belisarius for Eastern Roman Emperor Justinian I in the 6th century, Ravenna became the seat of the Byzantine governor of Italy, the Exarch, and was known as the Exarchate of Ravenna. It was at this time that the Ravenna Cosmography was written.

Under Byzantine rule, the archbishop of the Archdiocese of Ravenna was temporarily granted autocephaly from the Roman Church by the emperor, in 666, but this was soon revoked. Nevertheless, the archbishop of Ravenna held the second place in Italy after the pope, and played an important role in many theological controversies during this period.

=== Middle Ages and Renaissance ===
The Lombards, under King Liutprand, occupied Ravenna in 712, but were forced to return it to the Byzantines. Shortly after Aistulf, the Lombard Duke of Friuli, was crowned King of the Lombards in 749, he pursued an aggressive policy of expansion into the Byzantine Exarchate of Ravenna and the territory claimed by the Pope through the Patrimony of Saint Peter.

In 751, the Byzantines surrendered the Exarchate of Ravenna to Aistulf. Aistulf then proceeded farther south and threatened Rome claiming jurisdiction and demanding tribute and acknowledgement of his sovereignty. Pope Stephen II appealed to Aistulf but to no avail. In 753, Pope Stephen traveled to France to seek the help of Pepin, King of the Franks. Pepin responded favorably and ultimately conducted two campaigns to the Italian Peninsula to confront Aistulf with respect to territory that had been taken illegally.

Finally in 756, Aistulf conceded defeat, and agreed to pay reparations and surrender the territory taken five years earlier. At that time, Pepin fulfilled a promise that he had made two years prior in France and granted the pope the right to large territories that included the former Exarchate of Ravenna and the Roman duchy. This act has become known as the Donation of Pepin and provided the legal basis for the creation of the Papal States.

After Pepin’s Donation and the establishment of the Papal States, Byzantine-era administrative structures collapsed during the 9th and 10th centuries. Papal control was indirect, with local dukes and Lombard lords exercising de facto power. During the 11th and 12th centuries, Ravenna became a contested city between the Holy Roman Empire and the Papacy, with imperial appointees often clashing with papal legates.

The beginning of the 13th century was a period of great turmoil for the city of Ravenna. At that time, conflict between the Guelphs and Ghibellines was intensifying. In 1198, Ravenna led a league of Romagna cities and Marches against the Holy Roman Emperor, Otto IV. Pope Innocent III was able to capitalize on the anti-imperial sentiment in Romagna, to strengthen papal influence over Ravenna and other cities in the region.

In 1218, Pietro Traversari came to power in Ravenna after defeating the Ubertini and Mainardi factions during the Guelph-Ghibelline conflict. The Traversari family ruled Ravenna for 22 years until 1240 when Holy Roman Emperor Frederick II besieged Ravenna and expelled the Traversari after they aligned themselves with the pro-papal Guelphs.

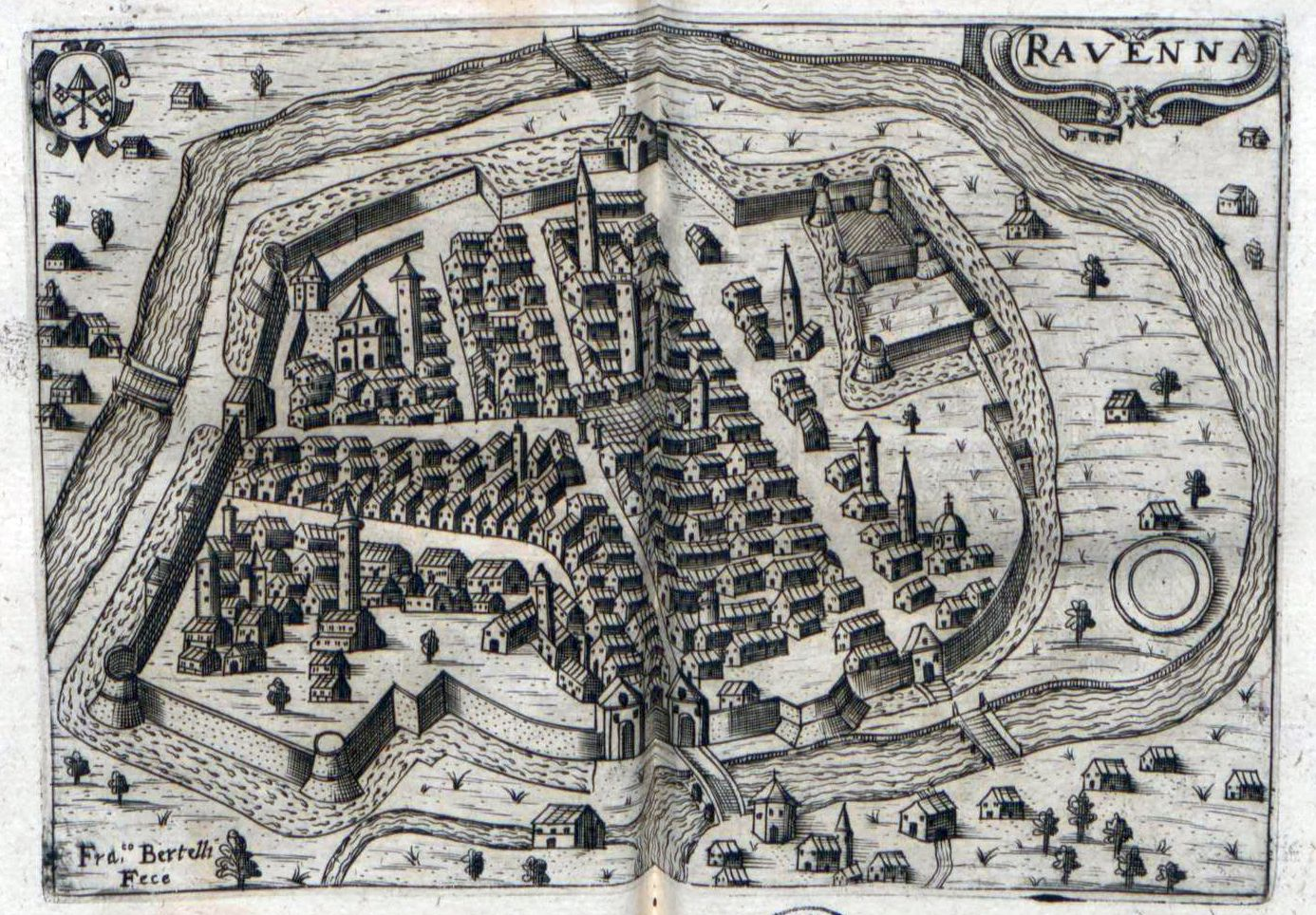
An illustration of Ravenna from Franz Schott's 1649 travel guide to Italy

Frederick’s Imperial Vicar ruled Ravenna for eight years until 1248 when Pope Innocent IV took Ravenna, and the Traversari returned to power. In 1275, the Traversari were driven from the city by Guido Novello da Polenta. The Da Polenta family established a hereditary lordship and governed with increasing independence as a papal vassal.

One of the most illustrious residents of Ravenna at this time was the exiled Florentine poet Dante. The last of the Da Polenta, Ostasio III, was ousted by the Republic of Venice in February 1441, and the city was annexed to the Venetian territories by the Treaty of Cremona.

Ravenna was then ruled by Venice until 1509, when the region was invaded in the course of the War of the League of Cambrai. At the Battle of Agnadello on 14 May, the French largely destroyed the Venetian army. Thereafter, the members of the League of Cambrai occupied Venice's mainland territories. After the Venetian withdrawal, Ravenna was again ruled by legates of the Pope as part of the Papal States. The Papal States retained control of Ravenna as the war continued, however in 1511, Pope Julius II created a new alliance with Spain and the Holy Roman Empire against France. In the conflict that ensued, France besieged Ravenna and then decisively defeated the League's relief forces at the Battle of Ravenna (1512). Following their victory, French troops sacked Ravenna. Contemporary accounts describe widespread killing of civilians and extensive looting of churches and houses. The French occupation lasted four months before their withdrawal.

In 1527, notwithstanding their alliance with Pope Clement VII, the Venetians occupied Ravenna and the Romagna, which, however, they were compelled to restore in 1529.

The city was damaged in a tremendous flood in May 1636. Over the next 300 years, a network of canals diverted nearby rivers and drained nearby swamps, thus reducing the possibility of flooding and creating a large belt of agricultural land around the city.

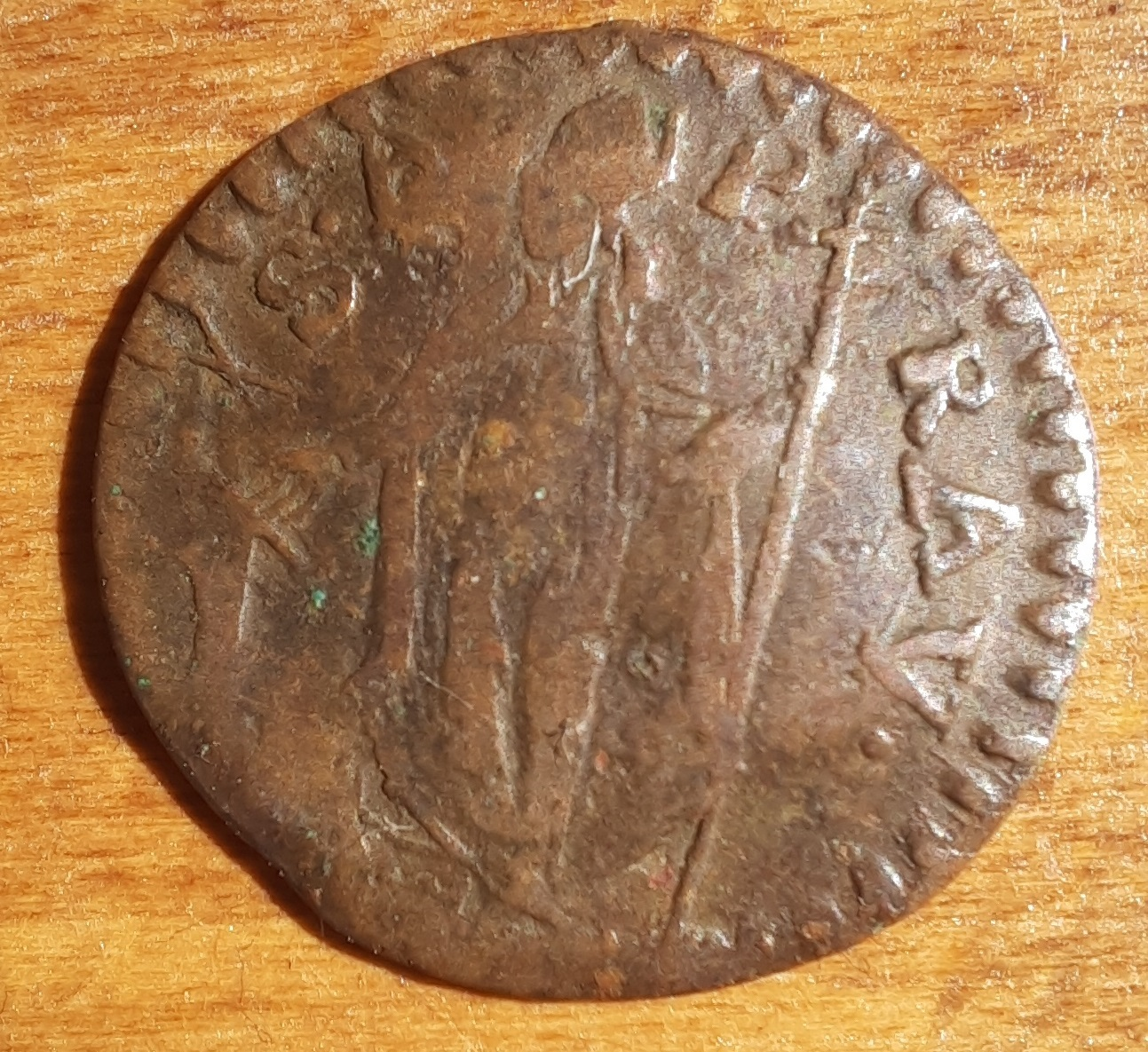
An 18th-century quattrino from Ravenna depicting Saint Apollinaris

=== Modern age ===
In the 17th and 18th centuries, Ravenna was part of the Papal States up until 1796, when it was annexed into the French puppet state of the Cisalpine Republic / Italian Republic, and then made part of the Napoleonic Kingdom of Italy in 1802. It was returned to the Papal States in 1814. Occupied by Piedmontese troops in 1859, Ravenna and the surrounding Romagna area became part of the new unified Kingdom of Italy in 1861.

During WWII, the town suffered severe damage. 52 Allied bombing raids had taken their toll, destroying some of Ravenna's noteworthy, unequalled early Christian art. Bombs intended for the railway station and its sidings had pulverised the Basilica of San Giovanni Evangelista in August 1944. On 5 November 1944 troops of 4th Princess Louise Dragoon Guards, 5th Canadian Armoured Division and the British 27th Lancers entered and liberated Ravenna. A total of 937 Commonwealth soldiers who died in the winter of 1944–45 are buried in Ravenna War Cemetery, including 438 Canadians.

== Climate ==
Climate data for Ravenna (1991–2020 normals, extremes 1947–present)
Month	Jan	Feb	Mar	Apr	May	Jun	Jul	Aug	Sep	Oct	Nov	Dec	Year
Record high °C (°F)	20.2 (68.4)	20.3 (68.5)	25.4 (77.7)	31.8 (89.2)	35.0 (95.0)	36.0 (96.8)	38.4 (101.1)	39.0 (102.2)	34.1 (93.4)	28.3 (82.9)	24.4 (75.9)	21.8 (71.2)	39.0 (102.2)
Mean daily maximum °C (°F)	7.6 (45.7)	10.2 (50.4)	14.3 (57.7)	18.3 (64.9)	23.7 (74.7)	28.0 (82.4)	30.6 (87.1)	30.5 (86.9)	25.9 (78.6)	20.4 (68.7)	13.9 (57.0)	8.4 (47.1)	19.3 (66.8)
Daily mean °C (°F)	4.4 (39.9)	6.1 (43.0)	9.8 (49.6)	13.7 (56.7)	18.6 (65.5)	22.7 (72.9)	25.1 (77.2)	25.0 (77.0)	20.8 (69.4)	16.2 (61.2)	10.6 (51.1)	5.2 (41.4)	14.9 (58.7)
Mean daily minimum °C (°F)	1.2 (34.2)	1.9 (35.4)	5.4 (41.7)	9.0 (48.2)	13.5 (56.3)	17.5 (63.5)	19.6 (67.3)	19.5 (67.1)	15.6 (60.1)	11.9 (53.4)	7.3 (45.1)	2.1 (35.8)	10.4 (50.7)
Record low °C (°F)	−13.8 (7.2)	−14.0 (6.8)	−5.4 (22.3)	−1.8 (28.8)	2.8 (37.0)	7.0 (44.6)	10.0 (50.0)	11.0 (51.8)	5.8 (42.4)	1.8 (35.2)	−3.6 (25.5)	−7.8 (18.0)	−14.0 (6.8)
Average precipitation mm (inches)	45 (1.8)	44 (1.7)	53 (2.1)	56 (2.2)	58 (2.3)	44 (1.7)	49 (1.9)	53 (2.1)	58 (2.3)	55 (2.2)	84 (3.3)	57 (2.2)	656 (25.8)
Average precipitation days (≥ 1.0 mm)	5	6	6	7	7	5	4	4	6	7	8	7	72
Source 1: Climi e viaggi
Source 2: Istituto Superiore per la Protezione e la Ricerca Ambientale (precipitation 1951–1980) Temperature estreme in Toscana (extremes)

== Demographics ==
Historical population
Year	Pop.	±%
1861	55,973	—
1871	58,544	+4.6%
1881	59,696	+2.0%
1901	62,723	+5.1%
1911	69,802	+11.3%
1921	70,502	+1.0%
1931	76,335	+8.3%
1936	80,658	+5.7%
1951	91,248	+13.1%
1961	114,854	+25.9%
1971	131,176	+14.2%
1981	137,375	+4.7%
1991	135,844	−1.1%
2001	134,631	−0.9%
2011	153,740	+14.2%
2021	155,836	+1.4%
Source: ISTAT

As of 2026, the population is 156,475, of which 49.0% are male, and 51.0% are female. Minors make up 13.2% of the population, and seniors make up 26.5%.

=== Immigration ===
As of 2025, immigrants make up 15.3% of the total population. The 5 largest foreign countries of birth are Albania, Romania, Senegal, Moldova, and Ukraine.

Foreign population by country of birth (2025)
Country of birth	Population
Albania	3,692
Romania	3,639
Senegal	1,227
Moldova	1,185
Ukraine	1,174
North Macedonia	1,061
Morocco	1,038
Nigeria	945
Tunisia	687
Poland	619
Bangladesh	590
Germany	438
Pakistan	409
Bulgaria	402
Switzerland	397

== Sights ==
Eight early Christian buildings of Ravenna are inscribed on the World Heritage List. These are:

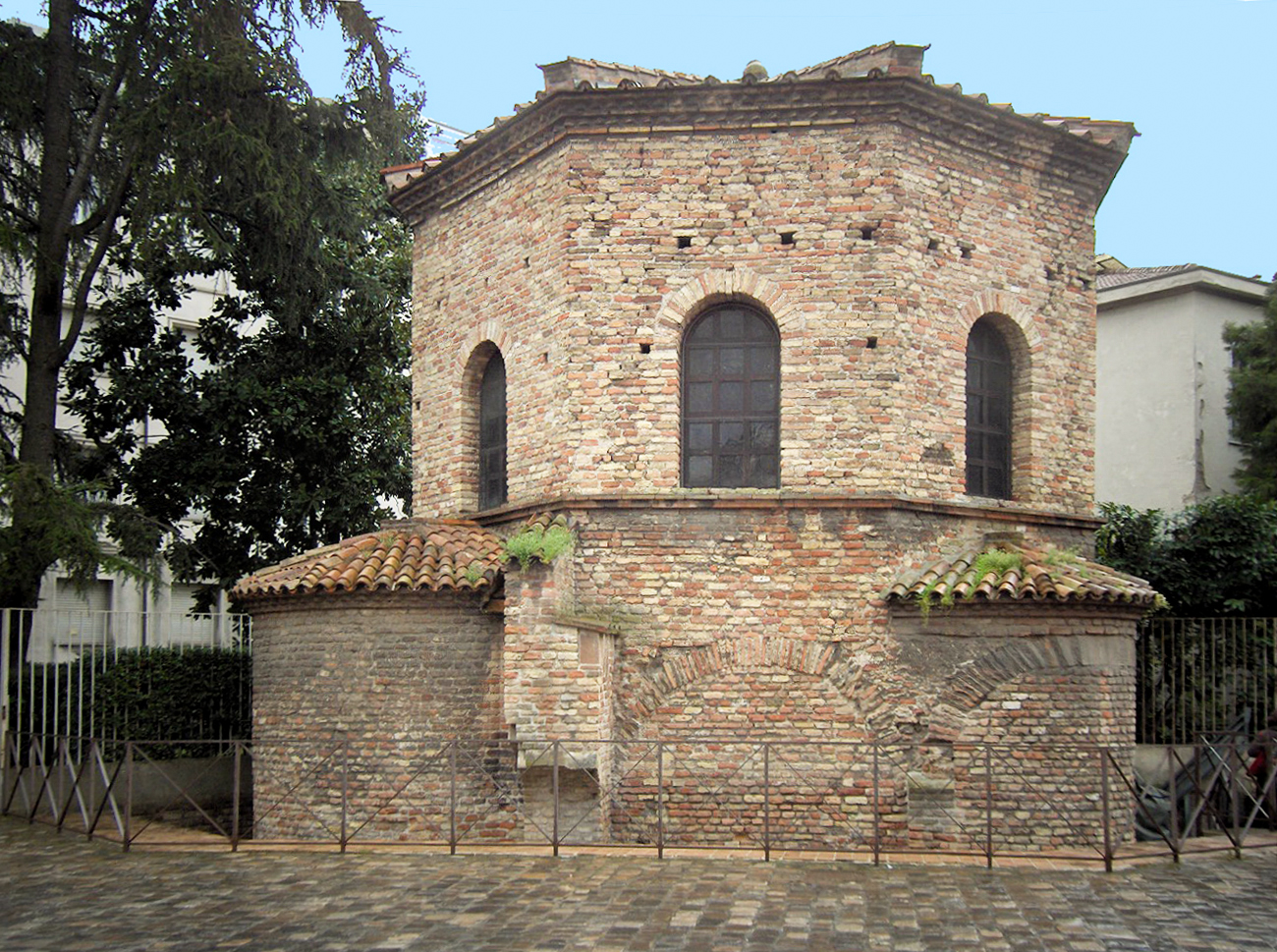
The Arian Baptistery, one of Ravenna's eight World Heritage site

- Orthodox Baptistery, also called "Baptistery of Neon" (c. 430)
- Mausoleum of Galla Placidia (c. 430)
- Arian Baptistery (c. 500)
- Archiepiscopal Chapel (c. 500)
- Basilica of Sant'Apollinare Nuovo (c. 500)
- Mausoleum of Theodoric (520)
- Basilica of San Vitale (548)
- Basilica of Sant'Apollinare in Classe (549)

Other historic sites include:

- The church of San Giovanni Evangelista is from the 5th century, erected by Galla Placidia after she survived a storm at sea. It was restored after the World War II bombings. The bell tower contains four bells, the two majors dating back to 1208.
- The 6th-century church of the Spirito Santo, which has been quite drastically altered since the 6th century. It was originally the Arian cathedral. The façade has a 16th-century portico with five arcades.
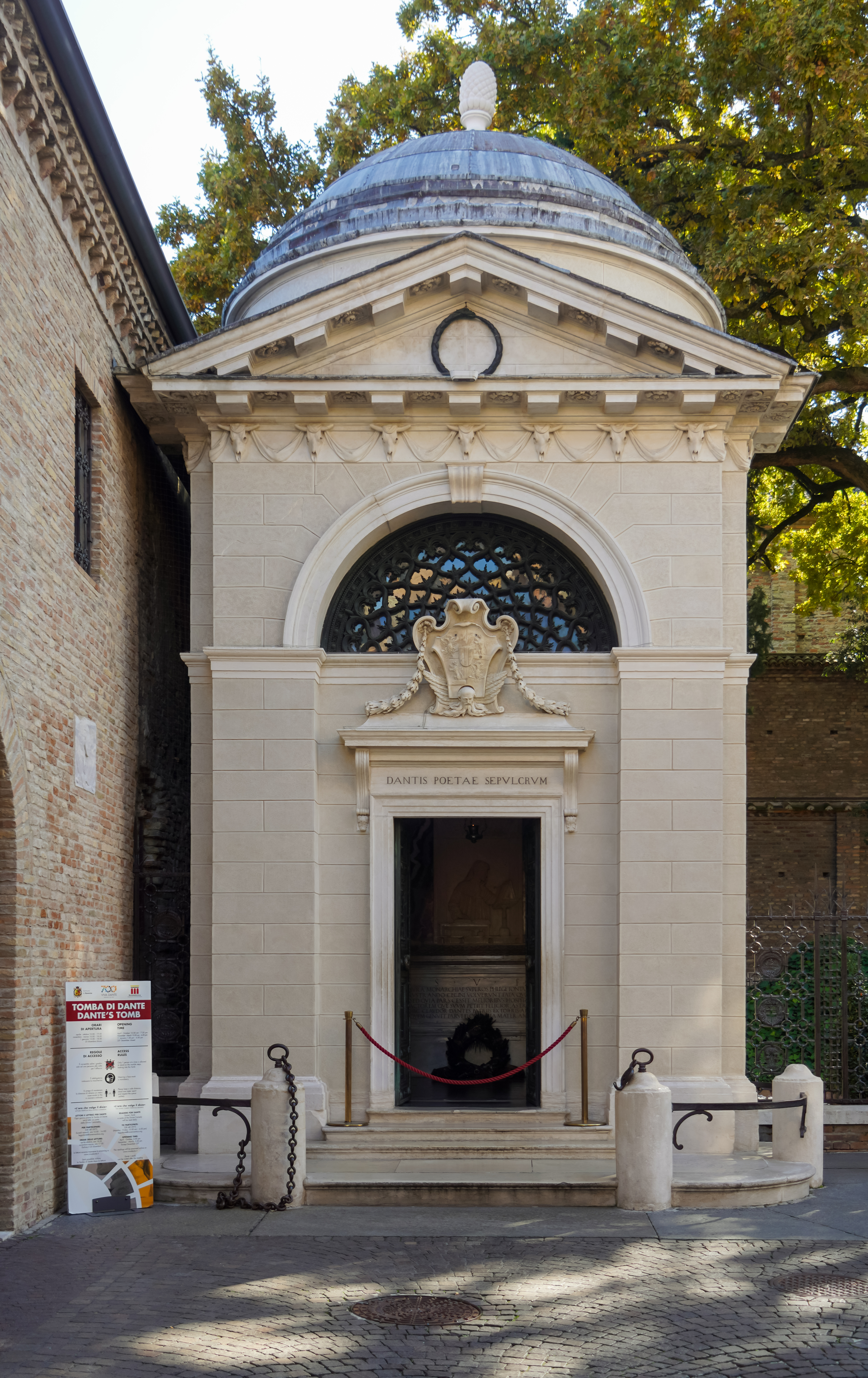
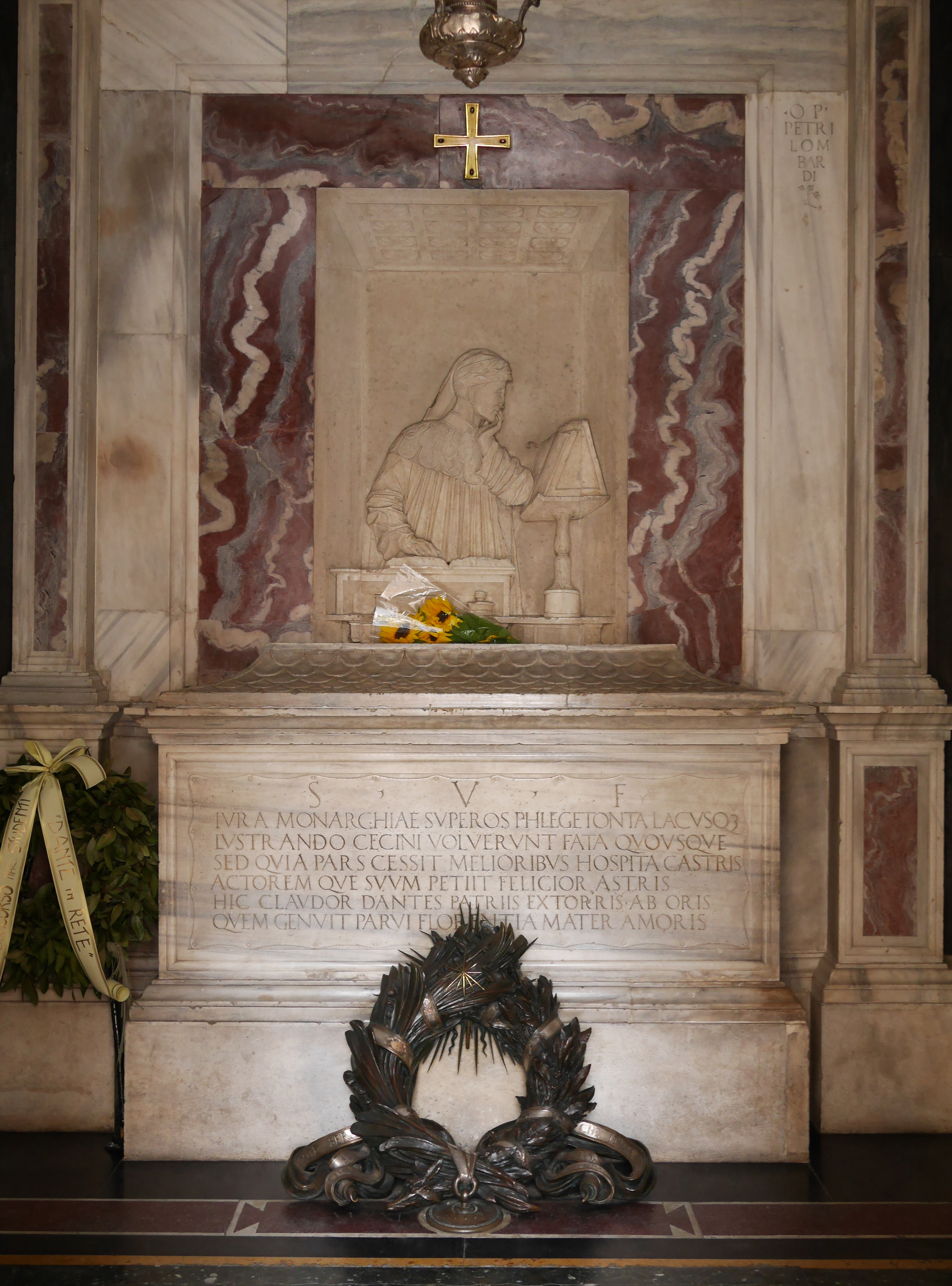
Dante's tomb exterior and interior, built in 1780
- The Basilica of San Francesco, rebuilt in the 10th–11th centuries over a precedent edifice dedicated to the Apostles and later to St. Peter. Behind the humble brick façade, it has a nave and two aisles. Fragments of mosaics from the first church are visible on the floor, which is usually covered by water after heavy rains (together with the crypt). Here the funeral ceremony of Dante Alighieri was held in 1321. The poet is buried in a tomb annexed to the church, the local authorities having resisted for centuries all demands by Florence for the return of the remains of its most famous exile.
- The Baroque church of Santa Maria Maggiore (525–532, rebuilt in 1671). It houses a picture by Luca Longhi.
- The church of San Giovanni Battista (1683), also in Baroque style, with a Middle Ages campanile.
- The basilica of Santa Maria in Porto (16th century), with a rich façade from the 18th century. It has a nave and two aisles, with a high cupola. It houses the image of famous Greek Madonna, which was allegedly brought to Ravenna from Constantinople.
- The nearby Communal Gallery has various works from Romagnoli painters.
- The Rocca Brancaleone (Brancaleone Castle), built by the Venetians in 1457. Once part of the city walls, it is now a public park. It is divided into two parts: the true Castle and the Citadel, the latter having an extent of 14,000 m^{2} (150,694.75 sq ft).
- The "so-called Palace of Theodoric", in fact the entrance to the former church of San Salvatore. It includes mosaics from the true palace of the Ostrogoth king.
- The church of Sant'Eufemia (18th century), gives access to the so-called Stone Carpets Domus (6th–7th century): this houses splendid mosaics from a Byzantine palace.
- The National Museum
- The Archiepiscopal Museum
- The Capanno Garibaldi, a hunting cabin on the road to Porto Corsini known for having sheltered Giuseppe Garibaldi on the night of 6–7 August 1849
Early Christian and Byzantine mosaics in Ravenna

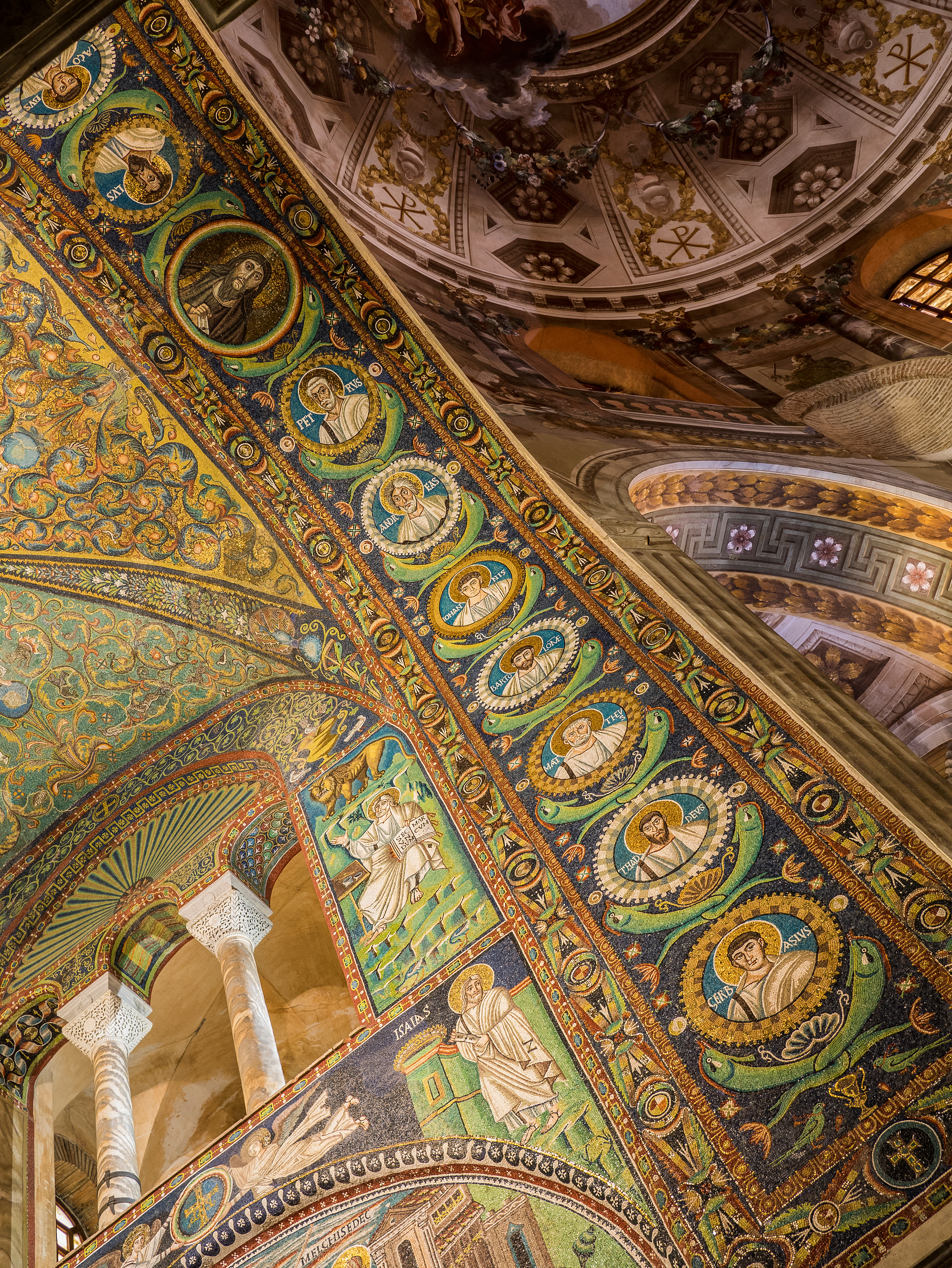
Triumphal arch mosaics of the Basilica of San Vitale

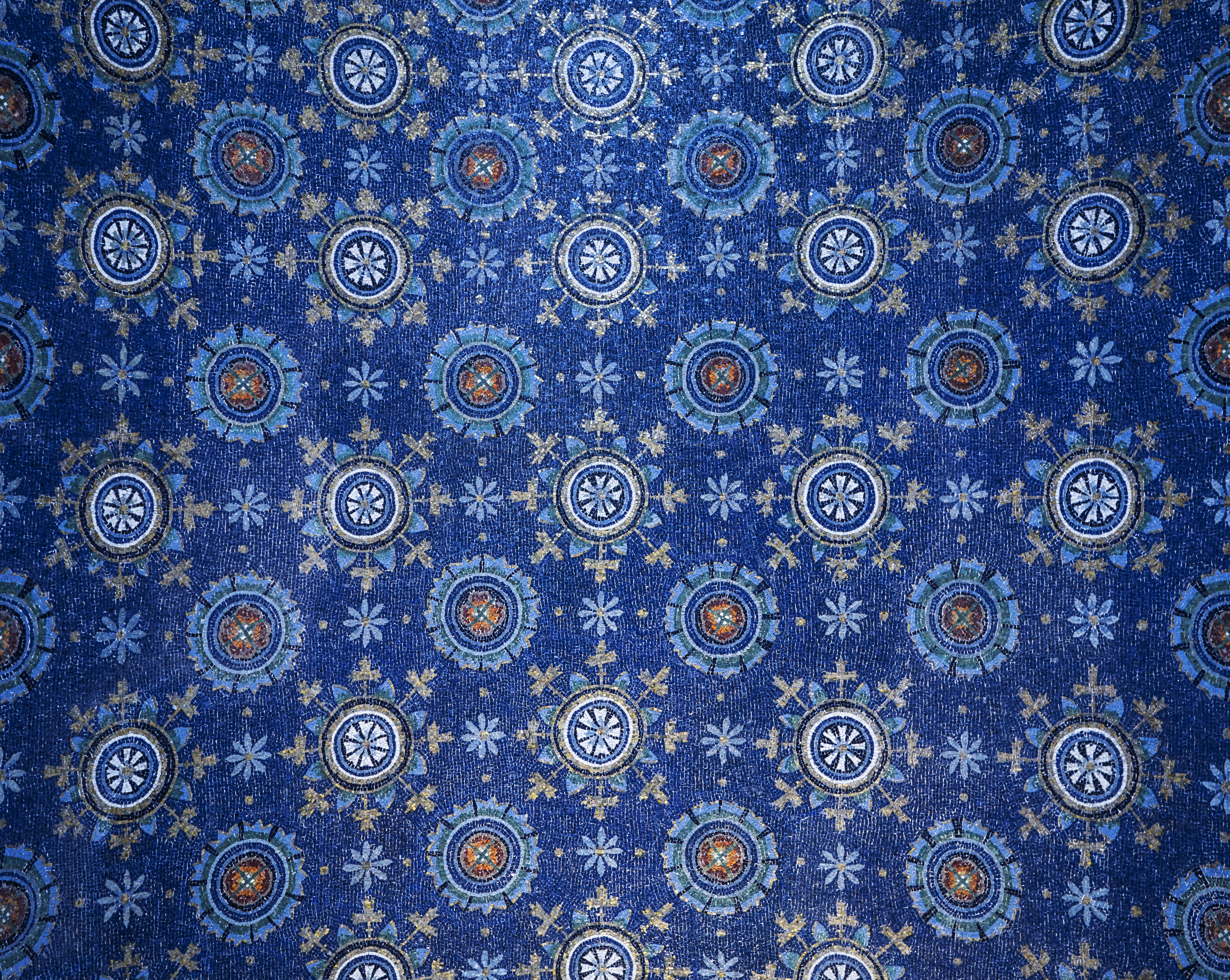
Garden of Eden mosaic in Mausoleum of Galla Placidia (5th century AD)

Arian Baptistry ceiling mosaic

Baptistry of Neon mosaic

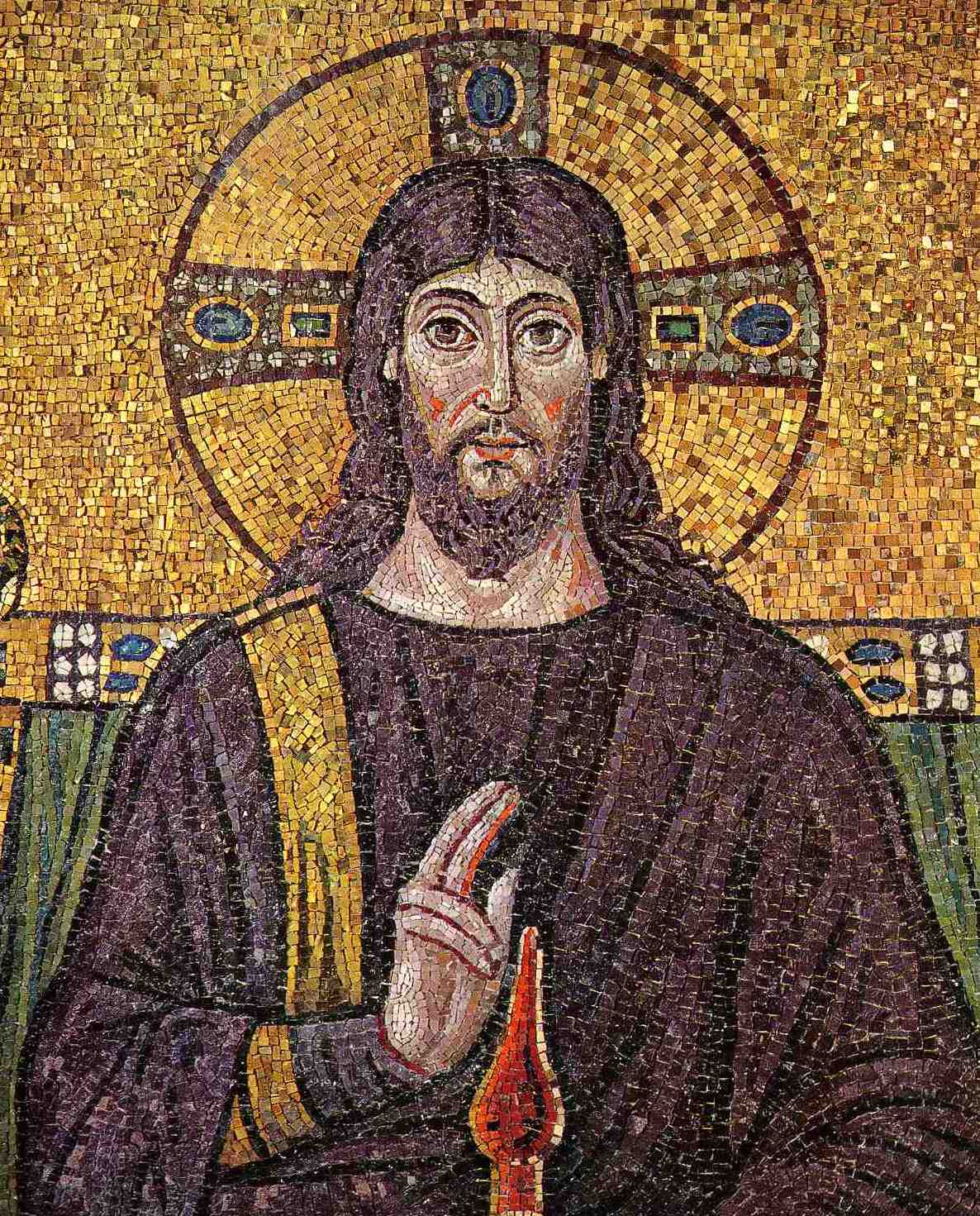
6th-century mosaic of Jesus in Byzantine style, Sant'Apollinare Nuovo

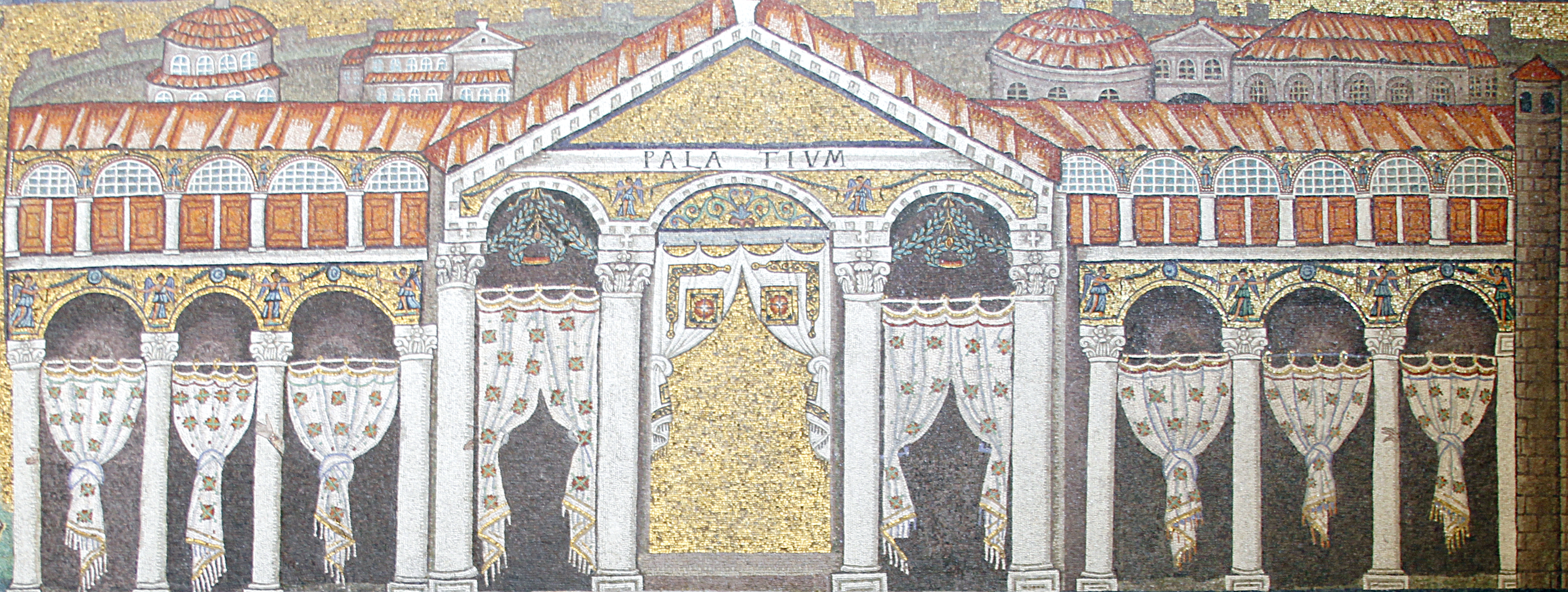
Mosaic of the Palace of Theodoric in Sant'Apollinare Nuovo. The panel initially featured the church's patrons, namely the Arian Ostrogoths. After the Byzantine conquest of Italy, the images of the Ostrogoths were covered up with a layer of mosaics, in an act of damnatio memoriae

=== Amusement parks ===
- Mirabilandia
- Safari Ravenna

== Transport ==
Ravenna has an important commercial and tourist port.

Ravenna railway station has direct Trenitalia service to Bologna, Ferrara, Lecce, Milan, Parma, Rimini, and Verona.

Ravenna Airport is located in Ravenna. The nearest commercial airports are those of Forlì, Rimini and Bologna.

Freeways crossing Ravenna include: A14-bis from the hub of Bologna; on the north–south axis of EU routes E45 (from Rome) and E55 (SS-309 "Romea" from Venice); and on the regional Ferrara-Rimini axis of SS-16 (partially called "Adriatica").

== Music ==
The city annually hosts the Ravenna Festival. Opera performances are held at the Teatro Alighieri while concerts take place at the Palazzo Mauro de André as well as in the ancient Basilica of San Vitale and Basilica of Sant'Apollinare in Classe. Chicago Symphony Orchestra music director Riccardo Muti, a longtime resident of the city, regularly participates in the festival, which invites orchestras and other performers from around the world.

== Sport ==
The traditional football club of the city is Ravenna FC. Currently it plays in the third tier of Italian football, Serie C.

A.P.D. Ribelle 1927 is the football club of Castiglione di Ravenna, a town to the south of Ravenna.

The beaches of Ravenna hosted the 2011 FIFA Beach Soccer World Cup, in September 2011.

== In literature ==
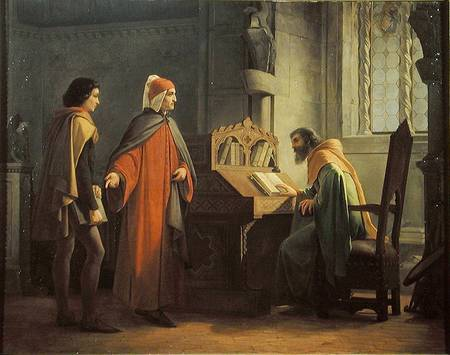
Dante Alighieri presenting Giotto to Guido da Polenta, painting by Giovanni Mochi (19th century), Galleria d'Arte Moderna, Florence

- After his banishment from his native Florence, Dante spent most of the rest of his life in Ravenna, and he mentions the city in Canto V of his Inferno.
- Also in the 16th century, Nostradamus provides four prophecies:
  - "The Magnavacca (canal) at Ravenna in great trouble, Canals by fifteen shut up at Fornase", in reference to fifteen French saboteurs.
  - As the place of a battle extending to Perugia and a sacred escape in its aftermath, leaving rotting horses left to eat.
  - In relation to the snatching of a lady "near Ravenna" and then the legate of Lisbon seizing 70 souls at sea.
  - Ravenna is one of three-similarly named contenders for the birth of the third and final Antichrist who enslaves Slovenia (see Ravne na Koroškem).
- Ravenna is the setting for The Witch, a play written in the 1610s by Thomas Middleton.
- Lord Byron lived in Ravenna between 1819 and 1821, led by the love for a local aristocratic and married young woman, Teresa Guiccioli. Here he continued Don Juan and wrote Ravenna Diary, My Dictionary and Recollections.
- Ravenna is the location where Lionel, the protagonist of Mary Shelley's post-apocalyptic novel The Last Man, comes ashore after losing his companions to a howling storm in the Aegean Sea.
- Oscar Wilde wrote a poem entitled Ravenna in 1878.
- Symbolist, lyrical poet Alexander Blok wrote a poem entitled Ravenna (May–June 1909) inspired by his Italian journey (spring 1909).
- During his travels, German poet and philosopher Hermann Hesse came across Ravenna and was inspired to write two poems of the city. They are entitled Ravenna (1) and Ravenna (2).
- T. S. Eliot's poem "Lune de Miel" (written in French) describes a honeymooning couple from Indiana sleeping not far from the ancient Basilica of Sant'Apollinare in Classe (just outside Ravenna), famous for the carved capitals of its columns, which depict acanthus leaves buffeted by the wind, unlike the leaves in repose on similar columns elsewhere.
- British scholar and writer J. R. R. Tolkien may have based his city of Minas Tirith at least in part on Ravenna.

== In popular culture ==
Michelangelo Antonioni filmed his 1964 movie Red Desert (Deserto rosso) within the industrialised areas of the Pialassa valley.

== Notable people ==
- Valentinian III (419–455), Roman Emperor
- Matteo Plazzi, Italian sailor
- Patrizio Ravennate (active in the late 14th Century), historian and chronicler
- Giacomo Anziani (1681–1723), Italian architect, painter, and engraver
- Laura Pausini (born 1974), Italian pop singer-songwriter, record producer and television personality
- Raul Gardini (1933–1993), Italian businessman
- Franco Manzecchi (1931–1979), Jazz drummer
- Andrea Montanari (born 1965), Italian sprinter
- Arcangelo Corelli (1653–1713), Baroque violinist and composer
- Luigi Legnani (1790–1877), guitarist and luthier
- Tullio Bassi (born 1937), Italian violin maker
- Peter Damian (c. 988 – 1072 or 1073), Catholic Saint and Cardinal
- Francesco Ingoli (1578–1649), Theatine scientist, lawyer, and disputer of Galileo
- Francesca da Rimini (1255 – c. 1285), historical person
- Guido I da Polenta (died 1310), lord of Ravenna
- Francesco Baracca (1888–1918), Italy's top fighter ace of World War I
- Federico Caricasulo (born 1996), motorcycle road racer
- Marco Melandri (born 1982), motorcycle road racer
- Davide Tardozzi (born 1959), Superbike racer and team manager
- Ivano Marescotti (1946–2023), actor
- Amadeus (presenter) (born 1962), presenter
- Romolo Gessi (1831–1881), explorer
- Romuald (c. 951 – c. 1025/27), abbot, founder of the Camaldolese order
- Marco Dente (1493–1527), engraver
- Rosetta Berardi (born 1944), artist
- Paolo Roversi (born 1947), fashion photographer
- Camillo Spreti (1743–1830), marquis and writer
- Angelo Mariani (conductor) (1821–1873), conductor
- Giuseppe Vitali (1875–1932), mathematician
- Evangelista Torricelli (1606–1647), physicist and mathematician
- Federico Marchetti (businessman) (born 1969), founder of YOOX
- Gianluca Costantini (born 1971), artist
- Luigi Rossini (1790–1857), artist
- Alex Majoli (born 1971), photographer
- Gianluca de Lorenzi (born 1972), racing driver and team owner
- Fabio Fabiani (born 1974), racing driver
- Eugenio Pisani (born 1991), racing driver
- Cesare Casadei (born 2003), football player

== Twin towns – sister cities ==
Ravenna is twinned with:

- Chichester, United Kingdom, since 1996
- Speyer, Germany, since 1989
- Chartres, France, since 1957

== See also ==
- Villaggio ANIC

== Sources ==
- Cameron, Averil. "Ravenna: Capital of Empire, Crucible of Europe". History Today (September 2020) pp 94–97.
- Janet Nelson, Judith Herrin, Ravenna: its role in earlier medieval change and exchange, London, Institute of Historical Research, 2016, ISBN 978-1-909646-14-8
