= Italic =

Italic may refer to:

== Italy ==
- Relating to Italy
  - Italic peoples, Italic-language speaking people of ancient Italy
  - Italic languages, an Indo-European language family
  - Old Italic scripts, alphabets of ancient Italy

== Calligraphy and typography ==
- Italic script, a method of handwriting
- Italic type, used in typography mainly for emphasis

== Other uses ==
- The Italic or Composite order
- Italic (company)

== See also ==
- Italica
- Italian (disambiguation)
