= Desiderio Spreti =

Desiderio Spreti (1414–1474) was an Italian historian of contemporary Ravenna.

== Biography ==
Born in Ravenna, he studied jurisprudence and was instructed in both Greek and Latin. He fled to Venice from his native city during the rule of Ostasio III da Polenta. Upon the deposition and exile of Ostasio in 1441, Spreti wrote chronicles of the events in his town, praising the Venetian role in deposing the Polenta rulers. The work titled De amplitudine, vastatione et instauratione urbis Ravennae libri III, initially published posthumously in 1488–1489 in Venice as a quarto, and dedicated by Jacopo Franchi to Nicolao Foscaro. It was republished in Ravenna in 1793 as a two volume text, with a biography by Carrari.
