= Baptiste Anziani =

French professional footballer (born 1990)

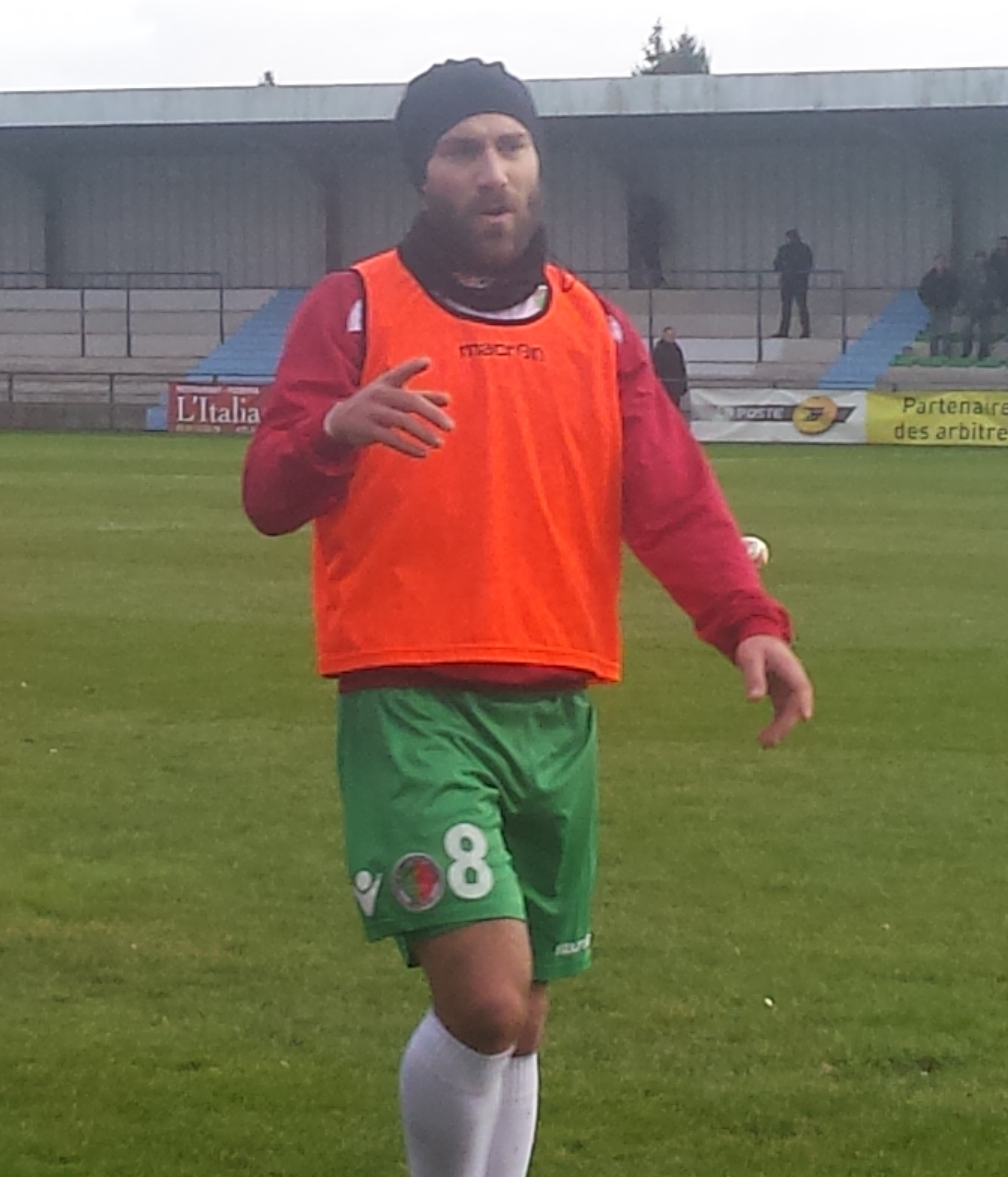
- Anziani in January 2015.

Personal information
- Full name: Baptiste Anziani
- Date of birth: 3 May 1990 (age 36)
- Place of birth: Toulon, France
- Height: 1.80 m (5 ft 11 in)
- Position: Midfielder

Team information
- Current team: GFC Ajaccio

Youth career
- Bastia

Senior career*
| Years | Team | Apps | (Gls) |
| 2009–2010 | Bastia B | 23 | (2) |
| 2009–2010 | Bastia | 3 | (0) |
| 2010–2011 | Carquefou | 12 | (0) |
| 2012–2013 | Calvi | 28 | (1) |
| 2013–2015 | Sedan | 52 | (4) |
| 2015–2016 | Fréjus-Saint-Raphaël | 8 | (0) |
| 2016–2019 | Cannes | 45 | (1) |
| 2019–2020 | Bastelicaccia | | |
| 2020–2021 | Villefranche SJB | 3 | (0) |
| 2021–2022 | AS Vence | | |
| 2022–2023 | US Corte | 2 | (0) |
| 2023– | GFC Ajaccio | | |
- * Club domestic league appearances and goals

Baptiste Anziani (born 3 May 1990) is a French professional footballer who plays for GFC Ajaccio in Regional 2 since 2023.

== Career ==
Born in Toulon, Anziani played three games in the Ligue 2 for SC Bastia, before in summer 2010 signed with USJA Carquefou.
