= Giacomo Anziani =

Italian painter (1681–1723)

Giacomo Anziani (Ravenna, 1681 - 1723) was an Italian architect, painter, and engraver, active in a late-baroque style.

== Biography ==
He was a follower of Carlo Cignani. He made paintings of Santi Mauro, Placido, and San Felice with the Virgin for the now extinct church of San Giovanni Evangelista. He painted, along with his pupil Domenico Capaci, an altarpiece in the presbytery of Sant'Apollinare Nuovo in Ravenna. In 1723, he helped design the Teatro Communale, built posthumously.
