= Italic (company) =

Online marketplace

- Company type: Private
- Founded: 2018
- Headquarters: Los Angeles, California, {{{location_country}}}
- Founder: Jeremy Cai
- Industry: E-commerce
- Website: www.italic.com

Italic is an online marketplace selling luxury products, including women's and men's apparel, shoes, bags, accessories, fitness gear, and home goods.

== History ==
Italic was founded in 2018 by Jeremy Cai, whose family runs a manufacturing business. The website was launched on November 16, 2018.

Prior to its launch, the company had a wait list of 100,000 names, and had raised $13 million in funding from investors such as Comcast Ventures, Index Ventures, and Ludlow Ventures.

== Membership ==
At launch, the company charged a $10 per month membership fee for access to luxury goods sold through its website, with the membership fee waived for the customer's first year.

In January 2019, the company ended its membership model, before returning to a members-only model in May 2020, with the membership fee now $100 per year. The selection was broadened beyond the company's initial focus on fashion, expanding into home goods, fitness, travel, and pet accessories.

== Business model ==
Italic designs and develops products to be produced by manufacturers, partnering with them to sell label-free luxury goods on the Italic website. The products are exclusive to Italic and are sold at cost, direct to the consumer. The company makes a profit through membership fees, and its platform helps manufacturers track real-time inventory and sales.

== See also ==
- The Bash (company)
- Twice (online retailer)
