= Michele da Firenze =

Italian sculptor of the early 15th century, known for terracotta works

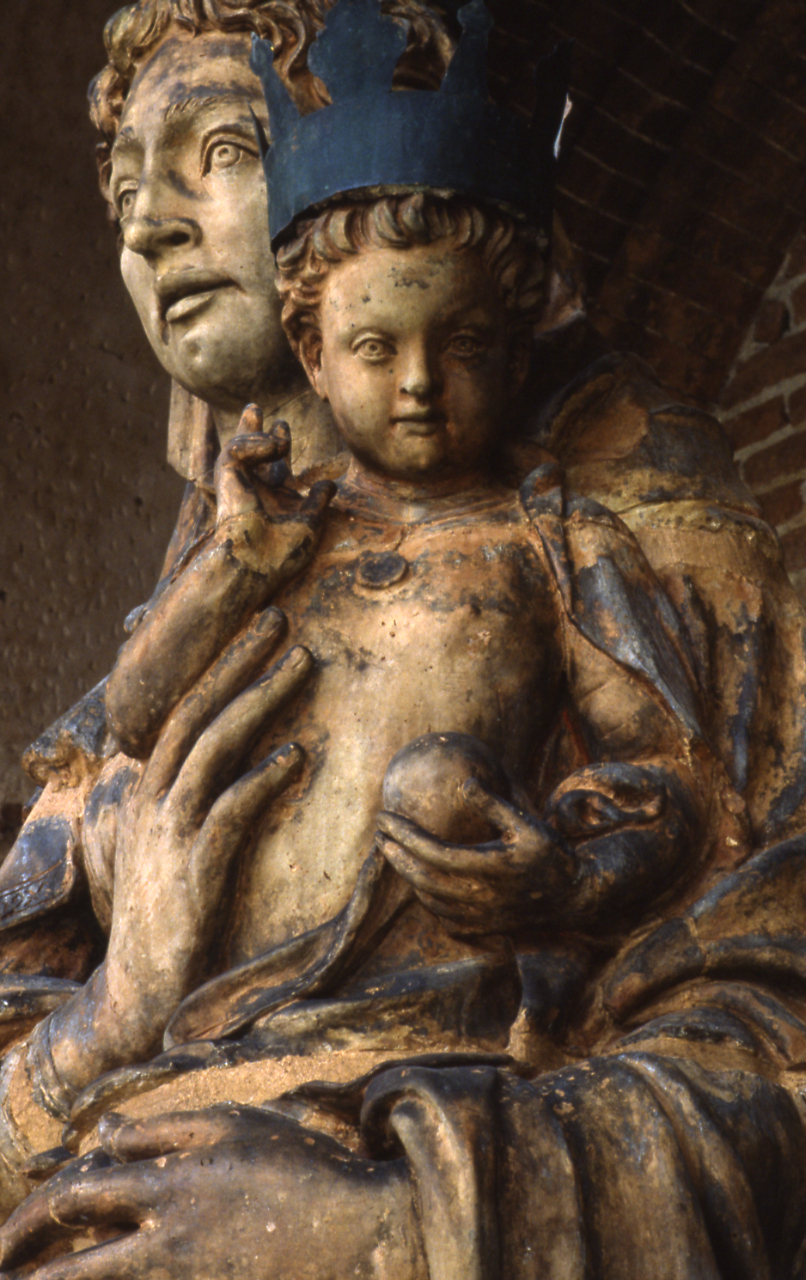
Michele da Firenze, Madonna con Bambino (1427), terracotta, detail. Ferrara Cathedral. Photo by Paolo Monti.

Michele da Firenze (born Michele di Niccolò Dini; Florence, 1385 - Florence, c. 1455) was an Italian sculptor in the first half of the 15th century, famous for being the first Florentine sculptor to specialize exclusively in the production of works in terracotta.

== Biography ==
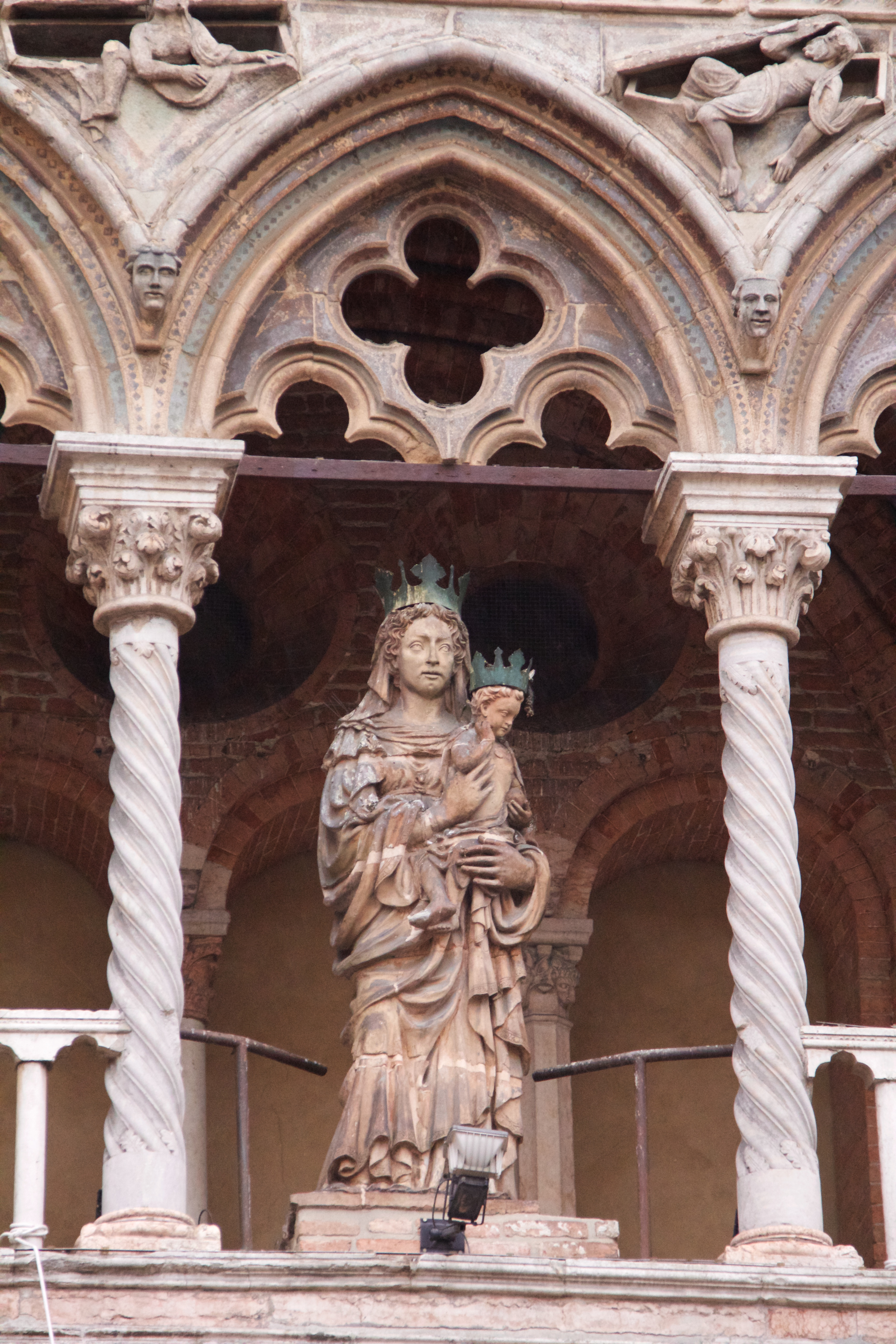
Michele da Firenze, Madonna con Bambino (1427), terracotta, Ferrara Cathedral

Distinctly influenced by Ghiberti (not surprisingly, the artist was part of the large team working on the North Doors of the Florence Baptistery between 1404–1407), Michele da Firenze’s identity was recovered in 1932 thanks to Giuseppe Fiocco, the first to attribute significant works to the sculptor. The artist characterized his itinerant career by alternating small private devotional tabernacles with grand and majestic undertakings, such as the decoration of the walls of the Pellegrini Chapel in the Veronese church of Sant'anastasia, considered his masterpiece.

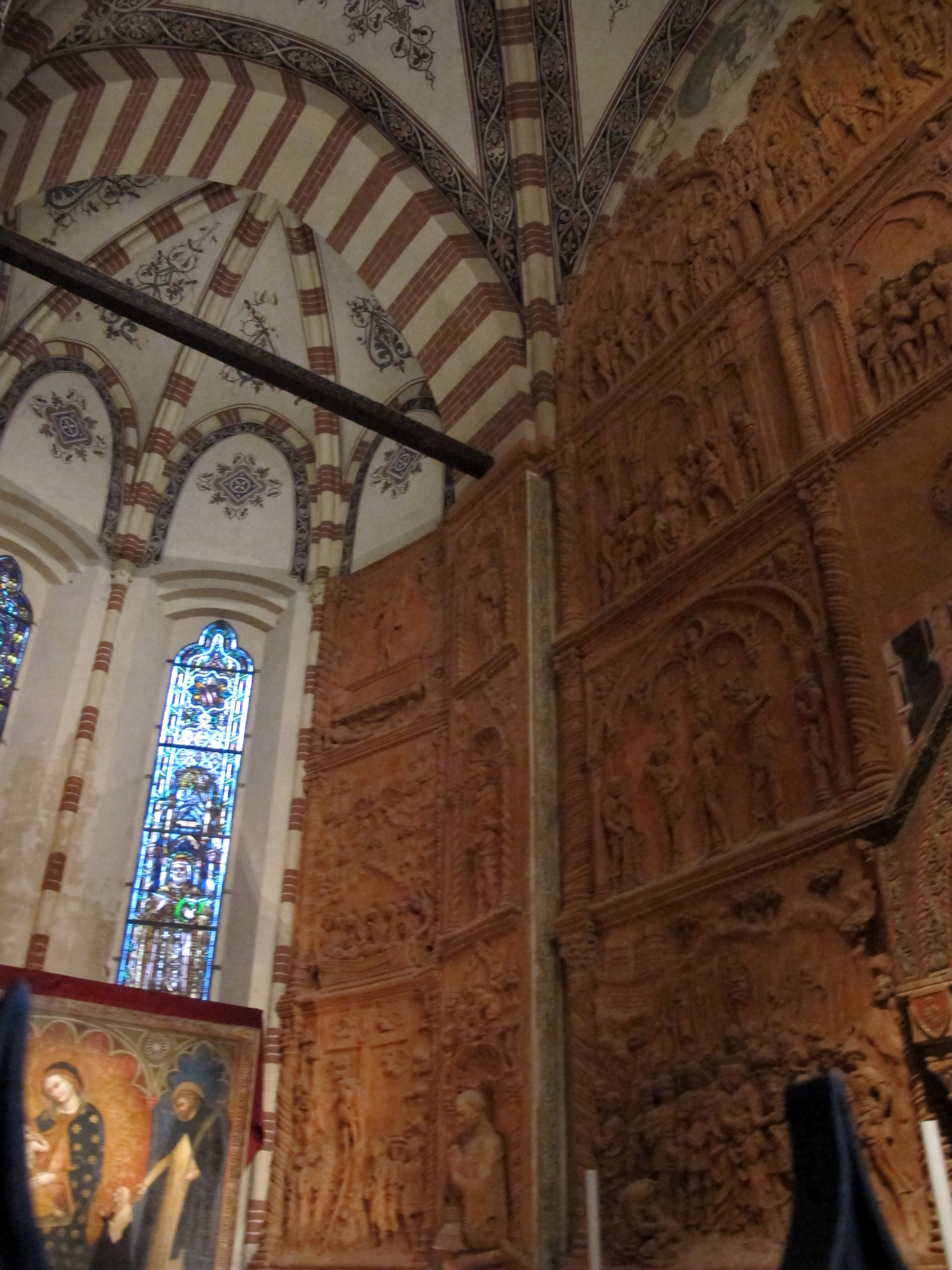
Michele da Firenze, Pellegrini Chapel in the Basilica of Sant'anastasia, Verona.

His somewhat uncertain early activity was outlined by art historian Aldo Galli, who identified a cohesive group of sculptures attributable to the first phase of his career, spent between Florence and Arezzo: consistently documented in the capital between 1417 and 1420 (the latter year when he was active in the workshop of Brunelleschi's Dome), during the same period, the artist created significant works such as the Sant'Antonio Abate in the State Museum of Medieval Art in Arezzo, originating from the Porta dello Spedale dedicated to the saint, the Crucifix preserved at the Diocesan Museum in Arezzo (indicating that the sculptor likely had a workshop in Arezzo for an extended period in the early 1420s), as well as the figure of the Saint Bishop in a small tabernacle displayed at the Staatliche Museen in Berlin, and numerous small tabernacles depicting Madonnas with Child and angels, preserved in the museums of Berlin, Florence, and Milan.

Dated to 1427 is the Madonna con Bambino (also in terracotta) placed within the portal of the Cathedral of San Giorgio in Ferrara, a piece of fundamental importance, on one hand, for excluding from Michele’s catalog two works traditionally attributed to him, namely the relief depicting a Madonna con Bambino in the Prato Civic Museum (now attributable to young Donatello) and the Madonna of the Church of San Martino, and on the other hand, for associating with the artist’s hand the sculpture of the same subject at the Bargello, and the so-called Madonna delle Lacrime, displayed in the Church of the Santissima Annunziata in Arezzo.

One of the artist’s most famous works is the Tomb of Francesco Roselli, an Aretine jurist buried in his hometown within his family chapel in the Basilica of San Francesco. Datable to around 1431 (the jurist died on October 27, 1430), the monument is atypical for Tuscany at the time: it consists of a richly decorated trilobed window, within which lies the gisant of the deceased, and at the back, against the wall, a Crucifixion with mourners.

The artist’s undisputed masterpiece remains the decoration of the two side walls of the Pellegrini Chapel in the Basilica of Sant'anastasia (Verona), created during his documented stay in Verona between 1433 and 1438. Commissioned by Andrea Pellegrini, depicted kneeling and praying, the work features seventeen reliefs depicting episodes from the life of Christ, interspersed with niches containing figures of saints with vine scrolls and floral motifs typical of the international Gothic style prevalent in Verona at that time. The final years of his career were spent in the Este duchy, where in 1440 Michele da Firenze was in Modena to create the so-called Altare delle statuine, intended for the city’s cathedral. In Modena, he also created the Compianto sul Cristo morto for the cathedral, which, after restoration, is now preserved at the Gallerie Estensi.

Documented in his old age in Pesaro until 1453, the artist presumably died in Florence during the 1450s.

== Bibliography ==
- Bellazzecca, Enrico (2010). Michele da Firenze [Michele da Firenze] (in Italian). Vol. 74. DBI.
