= Pellegrini Chapel (Santa Anastasia) =

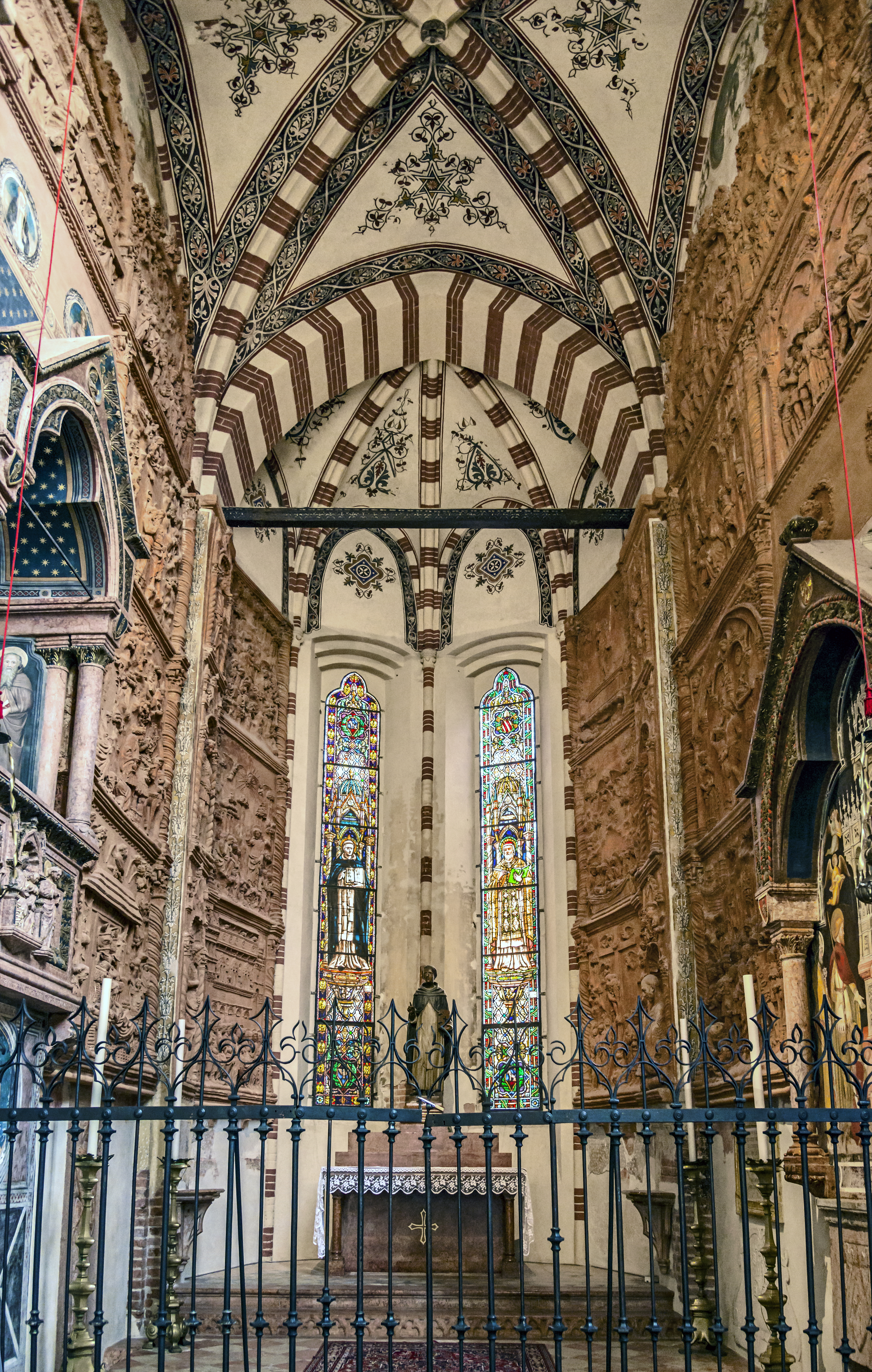
Pellegrini Chapel

The Pellegrini Chapel is located in the apse area of the basilica of Santa Anastasia in Verona, along the right transept; it is the first to the right of the Maggiore Chapel. The chapel contains what is considered Pisanello's masterpiece, the Saint George and the Princess, a fresco on the outer wall above the entrance arch.

== History ==
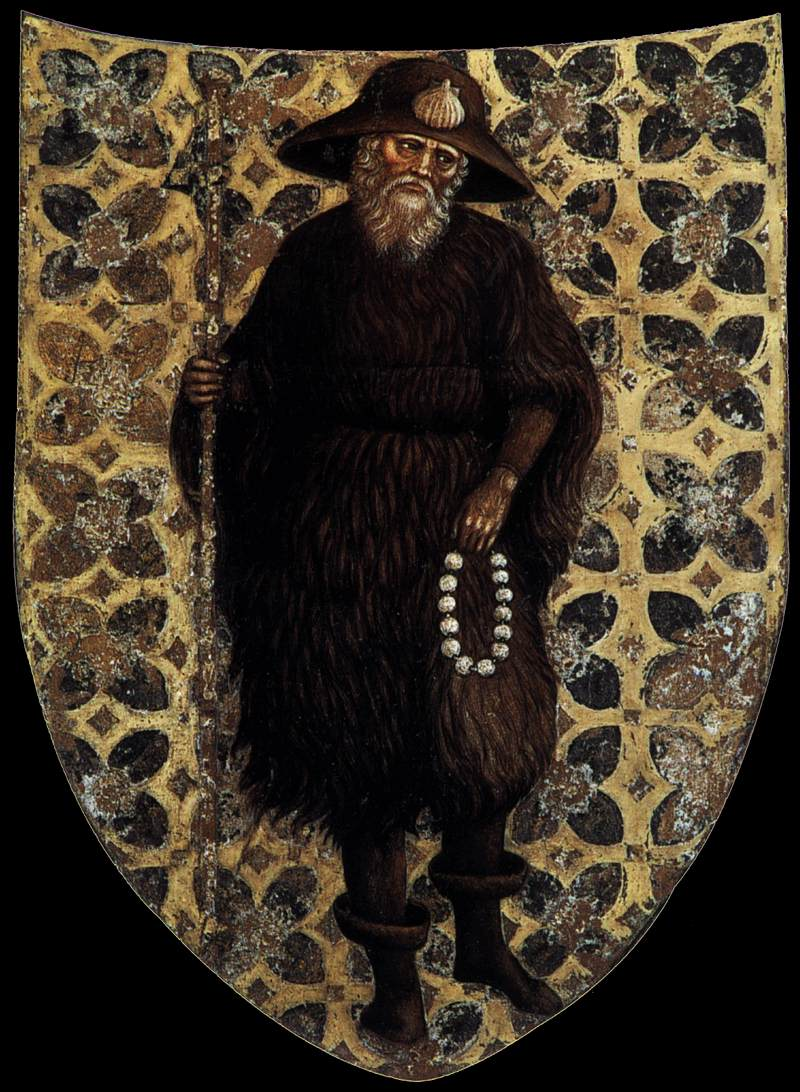
Pellegrinis' coat of arms

The decoration of the chapel is due to the testamentary provisions of Andrea Pellegrini, who in 1428 left the substantial sum of 900 ducats for the construction of a monumental ark to be built in the family chapel in Santa Anastasia. The following year, Pellegrini died, so his mother, carrying out his will, had her son's chivalrous virtues celebrated by means of Pisanello's fresco and in the chapel's terracottas, where he is depicted in military uniform and kneeling to the Virgin on the altar.

The dates on which the decorations took place are not certain: Michele da Firenze, the master who executed the terracottas, was in Verona from 1433 to 1438, so his work would have to be inscribed in this time frame. The work on the terracottas is testified, through documents, in 1436. Also, between 1433 and 1438 the fresco would have been executed by Pisanello, when the artist was in Verona for a long period. Probably terracottas and frescoes were, thus, made at essentially the same time. Giorgio Vasari, in Lives of the Most Excellent Painters, Sculptors, and Architects', spoke of the frescoes with admiring emphasis, stating that "to put it in a word one cannot contemplate this work done with design, grace, and extraordinary wisdom without infinite wonder, rather than amazement."

Over the centuries, some water seepage from the roof severely damaged it, so the fresco was detached through the strappo technique in 1891 (for the right side) and in 1900 (the left side); the work was divided into four parts, restored and placed on canvas, being relocated to its original position only in 1996.

== Description ==
=== Frescoes ===
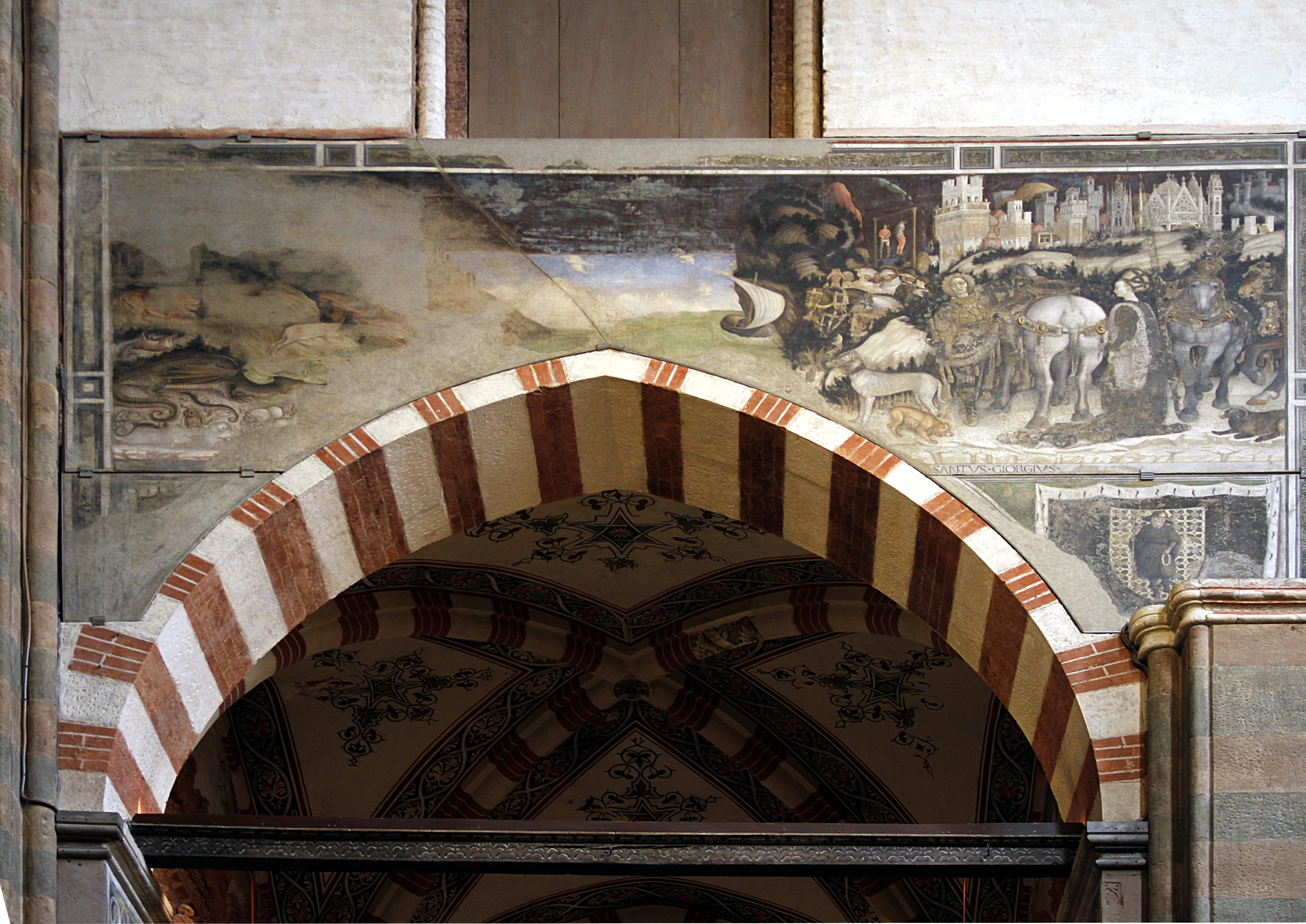
Pisanello, Saint George and the Princess on the entrance archway towards the chapel

The Pellegrini Chapel is best known for the fresco located on the outer archway, the Saint George and the Princess masterpiece by Pisanello and the International Gothic art in Italy. The fresco consisted of two parts: the right one, with Saint George's leaving the princess, which has remained in fair condition; and the left one, with the dragon among the remains of his victims beyond a watery environment cut through by a sailing ship, which is almost totally lost. Giorgio Vasari recalls how the decoration also included "St. Eustace caressing a dog spotted in brown and white" (still visible in the 17th century) and "a St. George armed with white weapons made of silver"; it is unclear where these works were located. However, it has been speculated that they might have been on the left pillar and the lesene to the right of the fresco.

The fairy-tale landscape, also populated with exotic characters and numerous animals depicted with great naturalness, presents in the background an ideal city with elegant towers and openwork architecture. Beneath the right side is the inscription "SANTVS GIORGIVS" and the coat of arms of the Pellegrini family, a pilgrim placed on a precious painted cloth bordered with ermine, whose etymological meaning coincides with that of the name Giorgio.

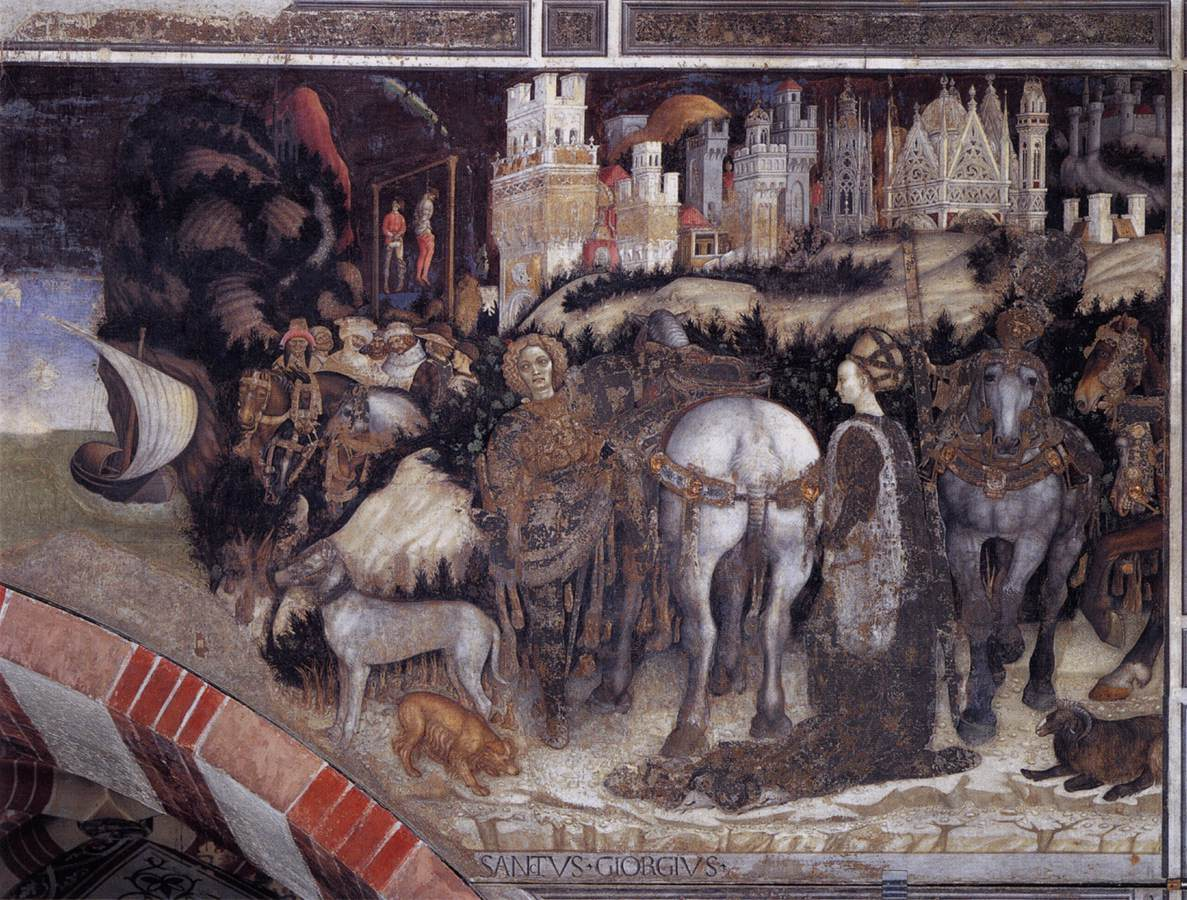
Details of Pisanello's fresco

The work (which fewer recent studies interpret differently) may allude to the events of the Pellegrini family and the anti-Venetian sentiment that had arisen in Verona during the early fifteenth century because of its loss of autonomy. Indeed, in 1411, the incursion of Sigismund of Hungary's imperial army took place supported by Brunoro della Scala followed, in 1412, by a pro-Scaliger uprising in the city. The royal procession in Pisanello's fresco could thus be a depiction of the emperor and his entourage while the winged dragon, portrayed as an amphibious animal, would represent Venice, which at that time had conquered Verona along with the other Mainland Domains, and whose symbol was the winged lion, often depicted with two legs in the water. The pro-scaligers uprising provoked a strong repression by the Venetian Republic resulting in many rebels being sentenced to death by hanging, a detail well depicted in the same fresco. The figure of the princess could instead be a portrait of Cristoforo Pellegrini's young bride, Laura Nogarola, an easily accessible model for the painter.

=== Terracottas ===
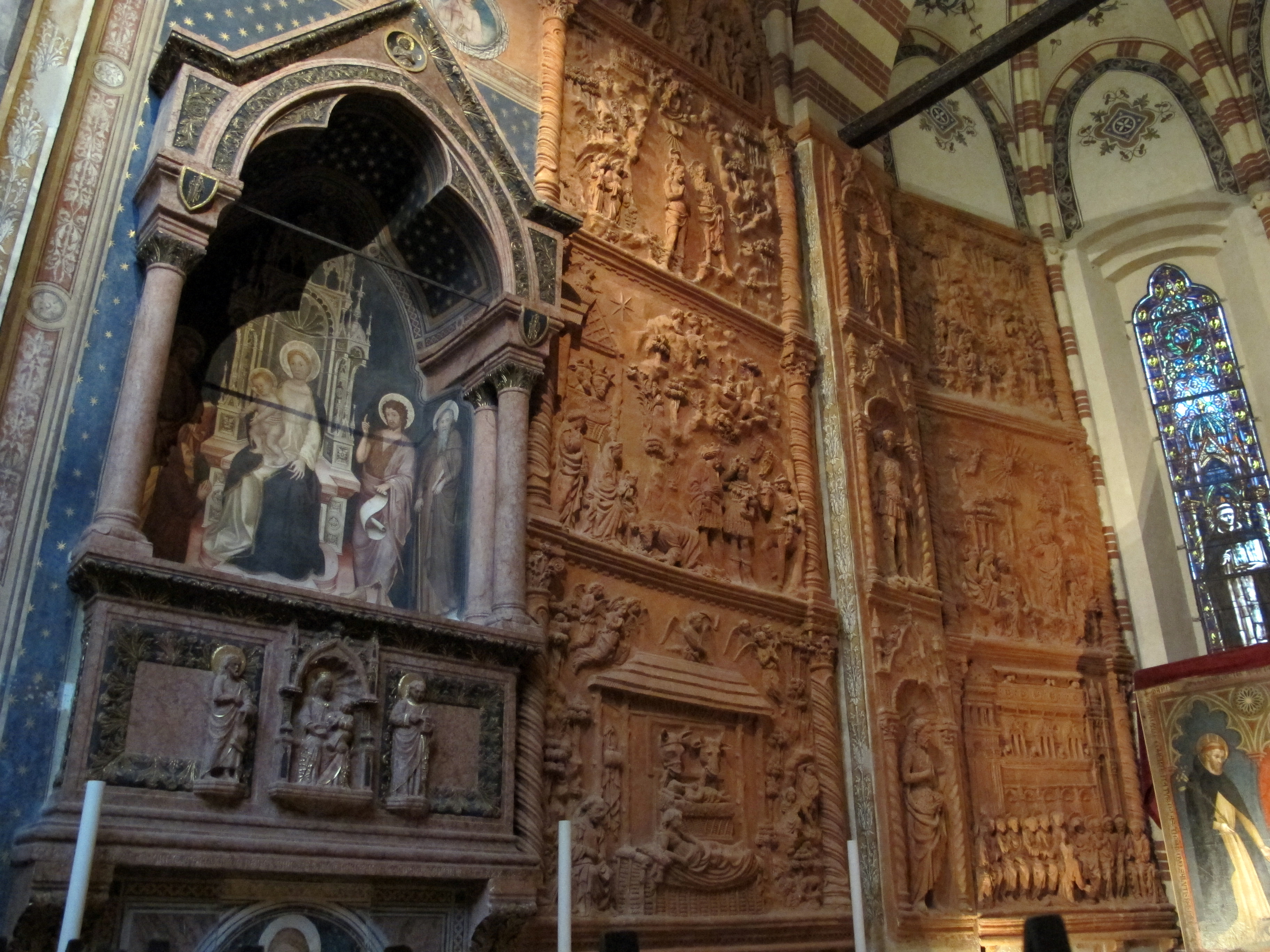
Michelle da Firenze's Terracottas inside the chapel and, on the left, Tommaso Pellegrini's tomb

The terracottas, originally polychrome, of the chapel are attributed to Michele da Firenze, an artist who was influenced by Lorenzo Ghiberti. He was Ghiberti's collaborator in the construction site of the North Gate of the Baptistery of Florence and as an engineer on the construction site of Brunelleschi's Dome. In the chapel, he depicted a series of seventeen episodes related to the Life of Jesus interrupted, in the two pilasters that support the archway separating it from the apse, by three orders of edicules containing the depictions, from bottom to top, of Andrea Pellegrini in an attitude of prayer toward the altar of the Virgin; St. Dominic and St. Peter the Martyr on the right; and St. John the Baptist, the Archangel Michael and St. Leonard on the left.

In the work of the chapel, Michele was assisted by his son Marsilio, whose other works are not known except those made after he was 30 years old in collaboration with his father, although he may have helped in the drafting of the fresco that Pisanello made for the same chapel. The strong influence of the Late Gothic culture in Verona is noticeable on Michele da Firenze's work, especially on the conception of space and the meticulous attention to detail. As can be perceived at the very early stage of his career, the sculptor was influenced by Donatello and especially Lorenzo Ghiberti.

=== Sepulchres ===
The Pellegrini-Bevilacqua sepulchre is found on the right wall of the chapel. It is characterized by an aedicule with a fresco by Martino da Verona, who depicted the Madonna col Bambino surrounded by four Musician Angels, addressing the three Bevilacqua introduced by Saints Catherine, Dominic, Anthony Abbot, George and Zeno. Under the aedicule is a plaque bearing a Latin cross and the Pellegrini and Bevilacqua coats of arms.

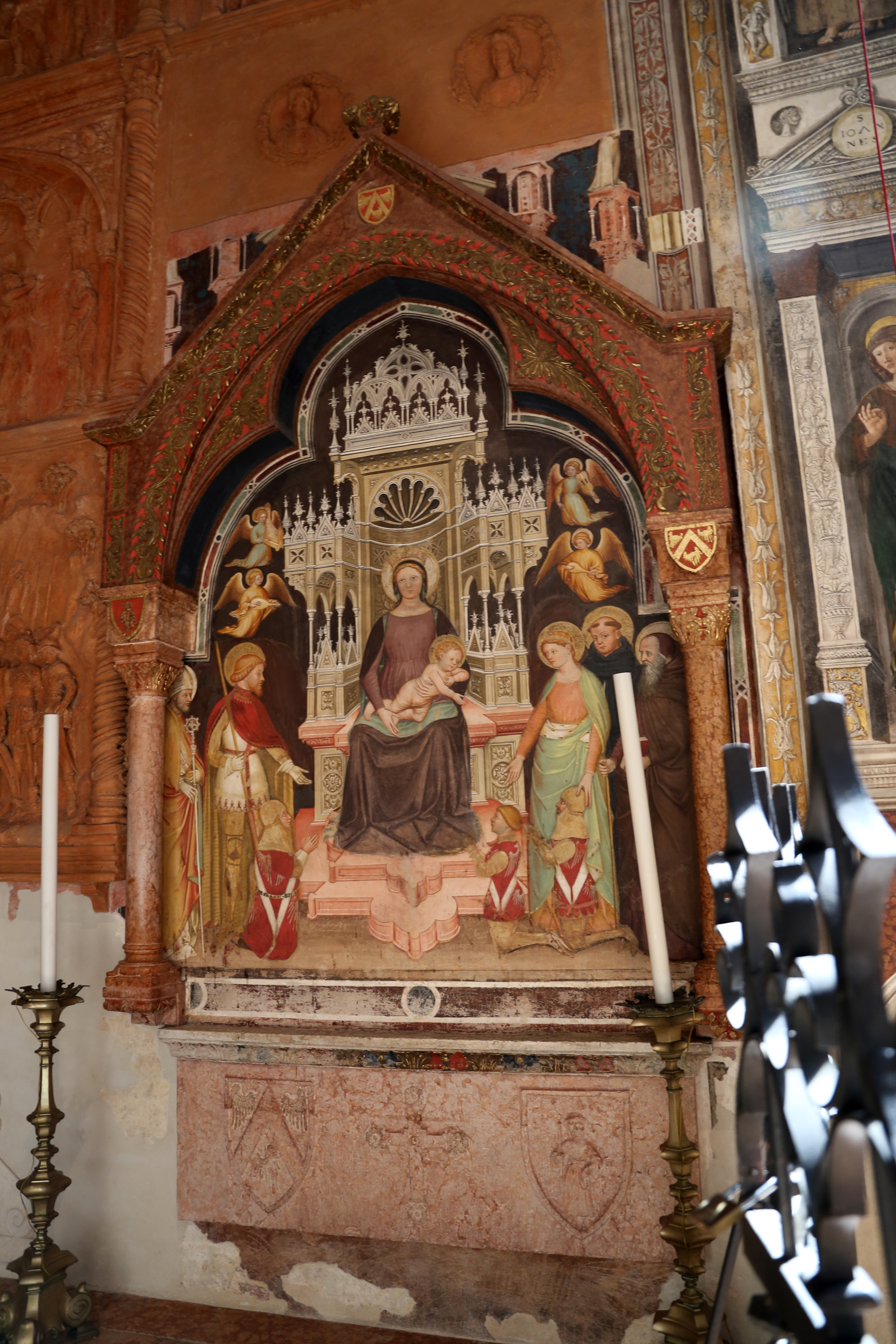
Pellegrini-Bevilacqua's sepulchre

The tomb of Tommaso Pellegrini, an important figure who in his 1492 will stipulated that his burial take place in the family chapel, is on the left wall. The tomb, a work by Antonio da Mestre, is comprised by the red marble tomb surmounted by a large cuspidate aedicule, where the family's coats of arms are located, and there is a tondo in the center depicting the Deposed Christ. The reliefs of the Madonna col Bambino are located on the ark, with St. John the Baptist and a saint with a book on either side. In the fresco, also characterized by the colors and intonations of Martino da Verona, there is a depiction of Tommaso Pellegrini in dark red robes, who is introduced by St. Thomas to the Virgin and the Child, while on the other side there is St. John the Baptist.

Wilhelm von Bibra was buried inside the chapel after his death on his return from a trip to Rome.

== See also ==
- Saint George and the Princess
- Santa Anastasia
- Pisanello

== Bibliography ==
- Claudio Bismara (2013). "La cappella Pellegrini e Pisanello civis originarius di Verona nel 1438" (PDF). Verona Illustrata. Rivista del Museo di Castelvecchio (26). Verona: Comune di Verona. ISSN 1120-3226. Archived (PDF) from the original on 17 June 2020.
- Paola Marini; Christian Campanella, eds. (2011). La Basilica di Santa Anastasia a Verona. Storia e restauro. Banco Popolare.
