= Saint George and the Princess =

Fresco by Pisanello

St. George and the Princess (right part).

Saint George and the Princess, also Saint George and the Princess of Trebizond, is a fresco by the Italian master Pisanello, located in the Pellegrini Chapel of the Church of Sant'Anastasia, Verona, northern Italy. It is one of the most notable works of International Gothic painting.

== History ==
The work was commissioned by the Pellegrini family, as testified by Andrea Pellegrini's testament of 1429. The external fresco, only partially preserved, was part of a cycle decorating the whole chapel.

The date of the work is uncertain. It is generally assigned to the period between the painter's return from Rome in 1433 and his departure to Ferrara in 1438. The terracotta decoration of the chapel is documented as existing in 1436 and the frescoes are perhaps from the same period, although the two works would hardly coexist. Some scholars date it to 1444–1446, after the Council of Ferrara, due to details connected to the Byzantine diplomats who took part in the latter (such as the horse with broken nostrils used by the Byzantine Emperor John VIII Palaiologos, or the style of some figures' hats). Such details could however come from Manuel II Palaiologos' procession at the Council of Constance (1414–1418): similar elements existed in the lost frescoes by Pisanello in St. John Lateran, documented by some surviving drawings based on those frescoes.

The fresco was long exposed to water seepage from the ceiling of the church and was severely damaged, especially in the left part which contains the dragon. The surviving part was detached from the wall in the 19th century, but this caused the loss of the metallic and gilt decorations.

== Description ==
The fresco was formed by two parts: the right one, with St. George leaving the Princess of Trebizond (Trabzon), which is in good condition; and the left one, with the dragon in the sea, which is nearly lost.

The surviving section shows the moment of St. George's legend in which he is mounting his horse (shown from the rear) before sailing to kill the dragon which was to devour the daughter of the city's king. Behind the princess, on the right, are three horses with knights, and a crouched ram. On the left are a hound and a companion dog.

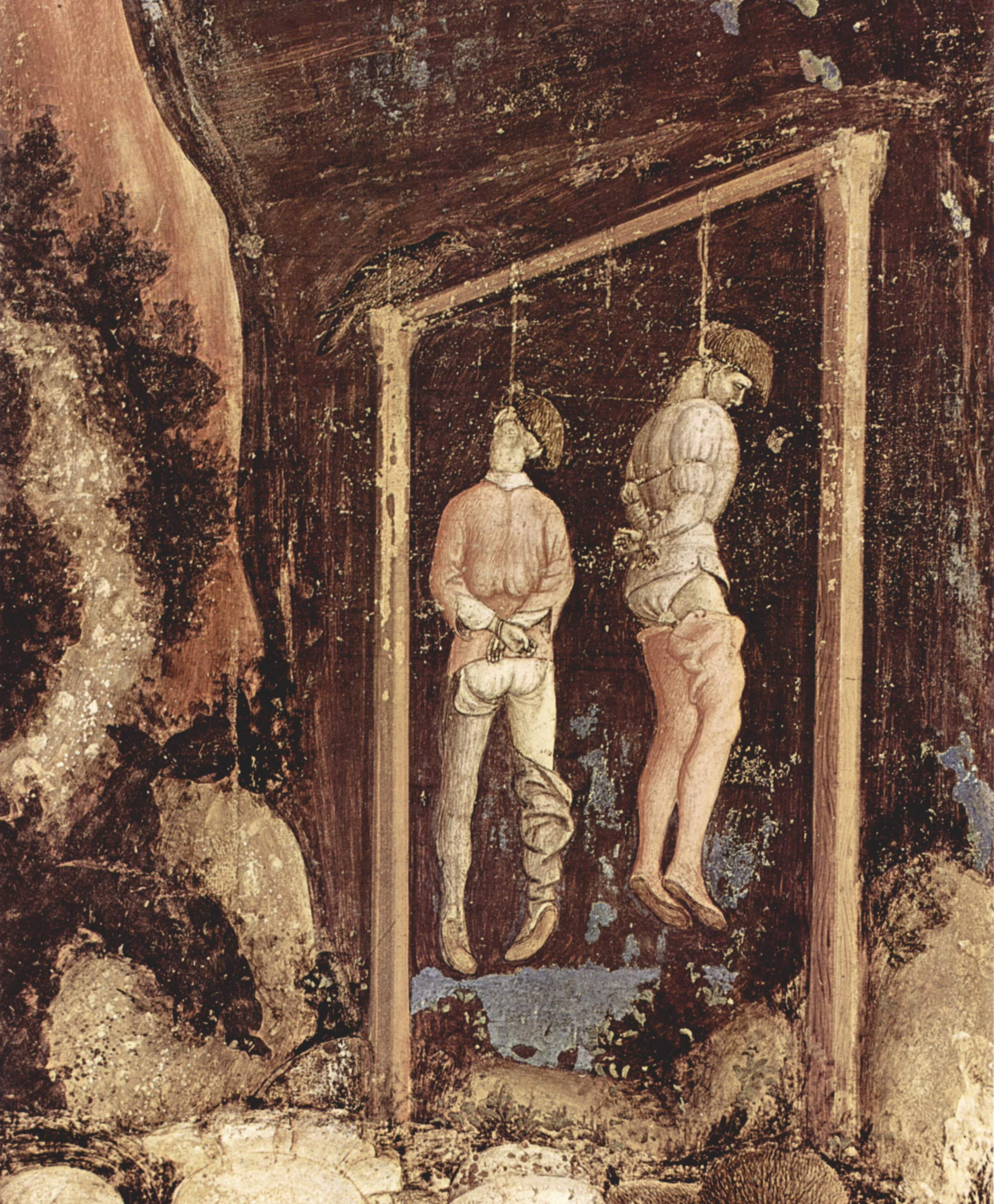
Detail of the hanged men.

The painting is highly detailed in the armor, the harnesses, and the garments of the princess and her following. The princess has an elaborate hairdo, with bends holding a large mass of hair; the latter begins very high on the brow, according to a style which was popular in the early 15th century, obtained by cutting the hair on the brow and the temples with a lit candle. The princess' dress is a sumptuous one in cloth and fur. The animals show Pisanello's passion for the portrayal of natural elements.

The left part is occupied by a procession of curious people, depicted in smaller proportions, who have gathered near the place where George's boat is ready to sail off. Their faces show a variety of portraits, which were accurately studied as testified by the numerous drawings executed by Pisanello and his workshop (now mostly housed in the Vallardi Codex, at the Cabinet des Dessins of the Louvre Museum in Paris). Among them are two grotesque faces, perhaps inspired by the descriptions of Ottoman Turks who were besieging Constantinople, or perhaps by the older accounts of the Golden Horde.

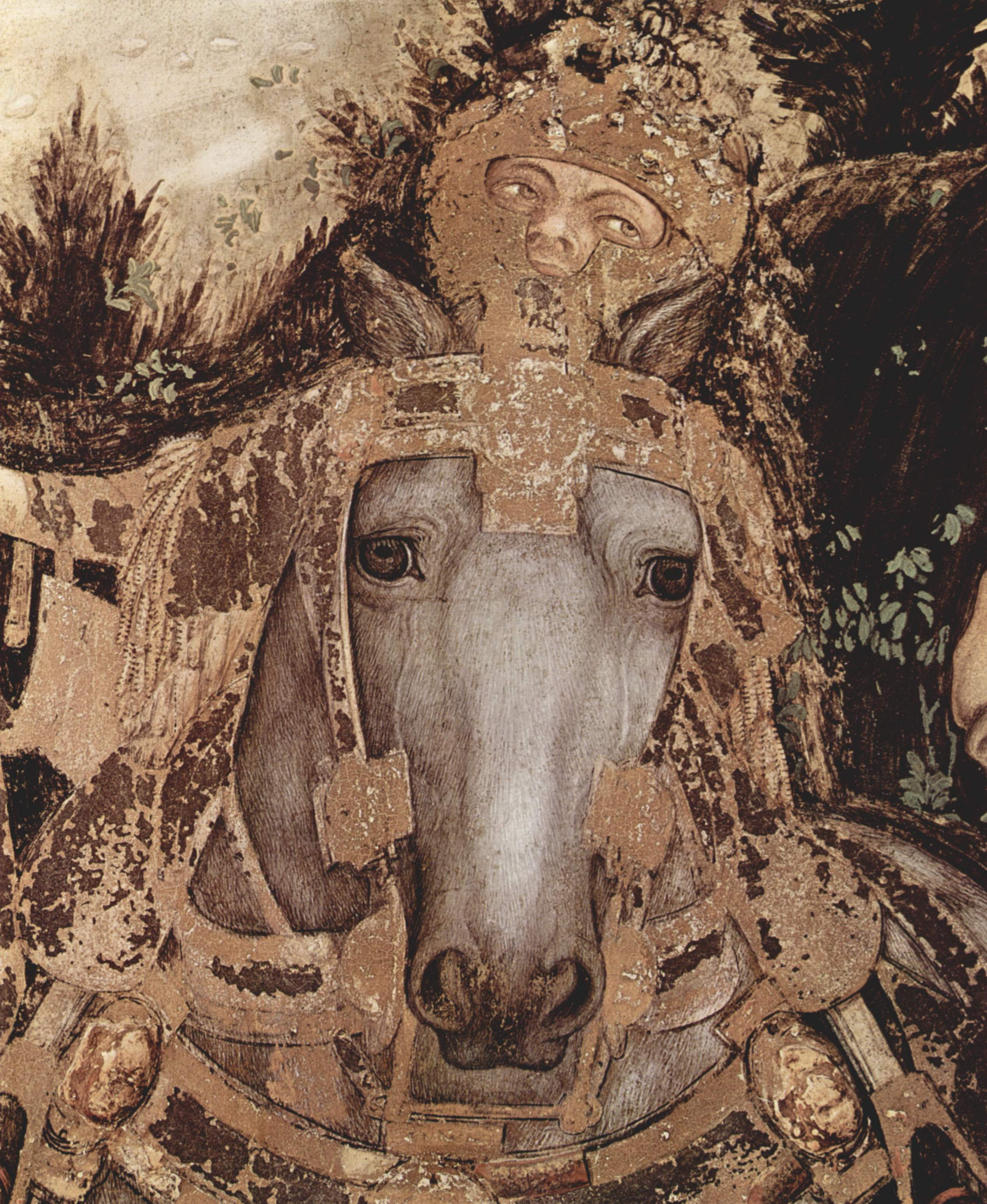
Detail of a knight with horse.

The upper part features a high cliff with an idealized depiction of Trabzon with rich architecture of towers, spires of religious buildings and, on the far right, a castle. Typical of International Gothic, there are some macabre and grotesque elements: outside the city walls are two hanged men, one with his hose fallen. The latter were perhaps inspired by the daily experience of the author at the Piazza delle Forche in Florence ("Gallows Square").

Some original color details are lost, including the tempera layer above the face, which now has become pale white; the sky, now heavily darkened; the silver of the armor, obtained by metal insertions, has now disappeared leaving a nearly black surface.

In the damaged section of the fresco, only a few details have survived. The most significant of these is a salamander walking among the bones and other remains of the dragon's victims.

== Sources ==
- L'opera completa di Pisanello, Rizzoli. Milan. 1966.
- De Vecchi, Pierluigi; Elda Cerchiari (1999). I tempi dell'arte, volume 2, Bompiani. Milan.
- Zeri, Federico (1999). Un velo di silenzio. Rizzoli.
