= North Doors of the Florence Baptistery =

Doors by Lorenzo Ghiberti in the Florence Baptistery

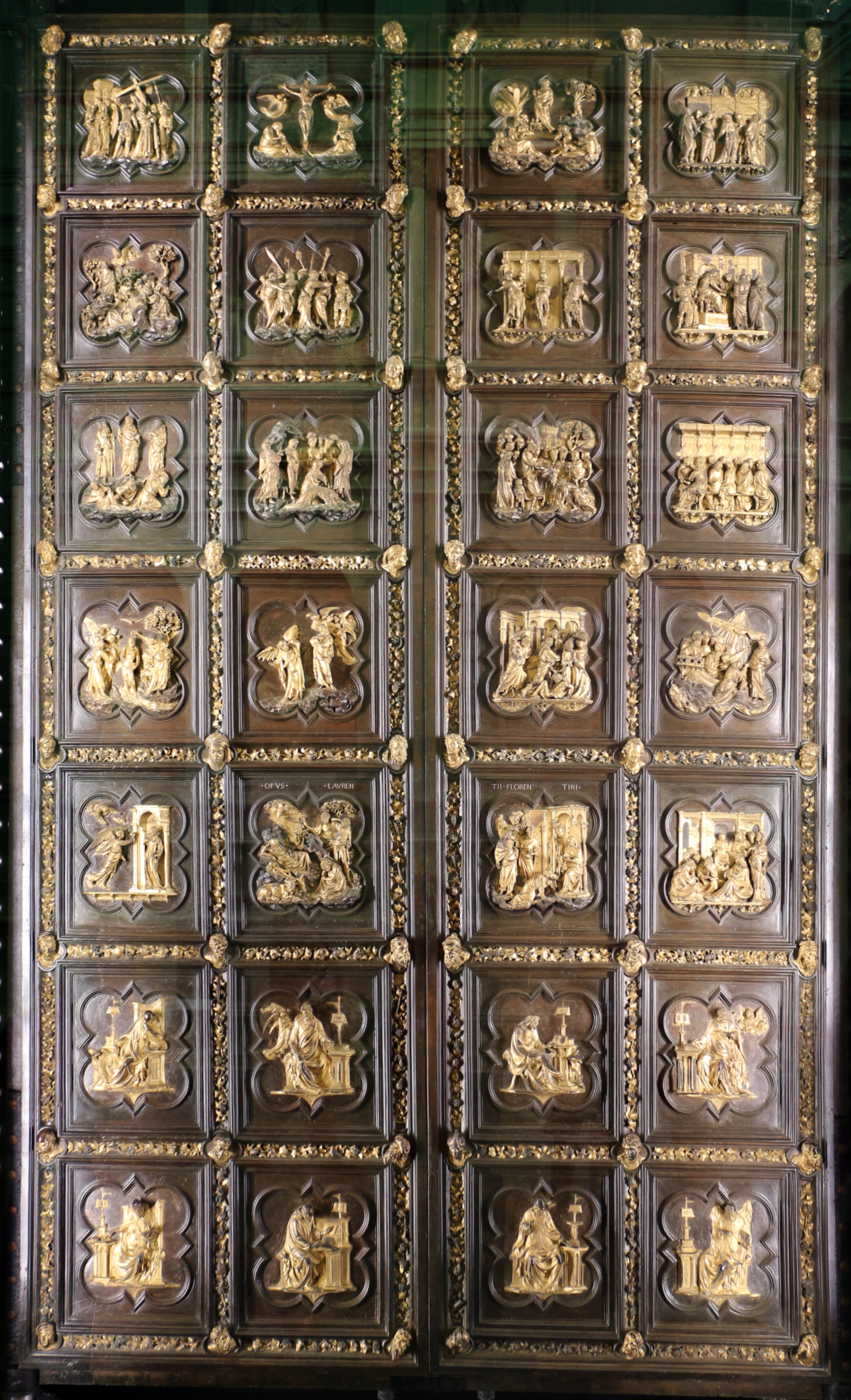
- Artists: Lorenzo Ghiberti and workshop
- Year: 1401–1424
- Medium: Gilded bronze
- Location: Museo dell'Opera del Duomo (a copy in the Baptistery), Florence

The North Doors of the Florence Baptistery were made by Lorenzo Ghiberti between 1403 and 1424 and represent his first masterpiece, before the celebrated Gates of Paradise. The work is signed in the center, above the panels of the Nativity and the Adoration of the Magi: “OPVS LAUREN/TII•FLOREN/TINI.” After restoration in 2013–2015 (during which much of the original gilding was restored) the doors were displayed in the new Museo dell'Opera del Duomo and replaced by a copy.

== History ==
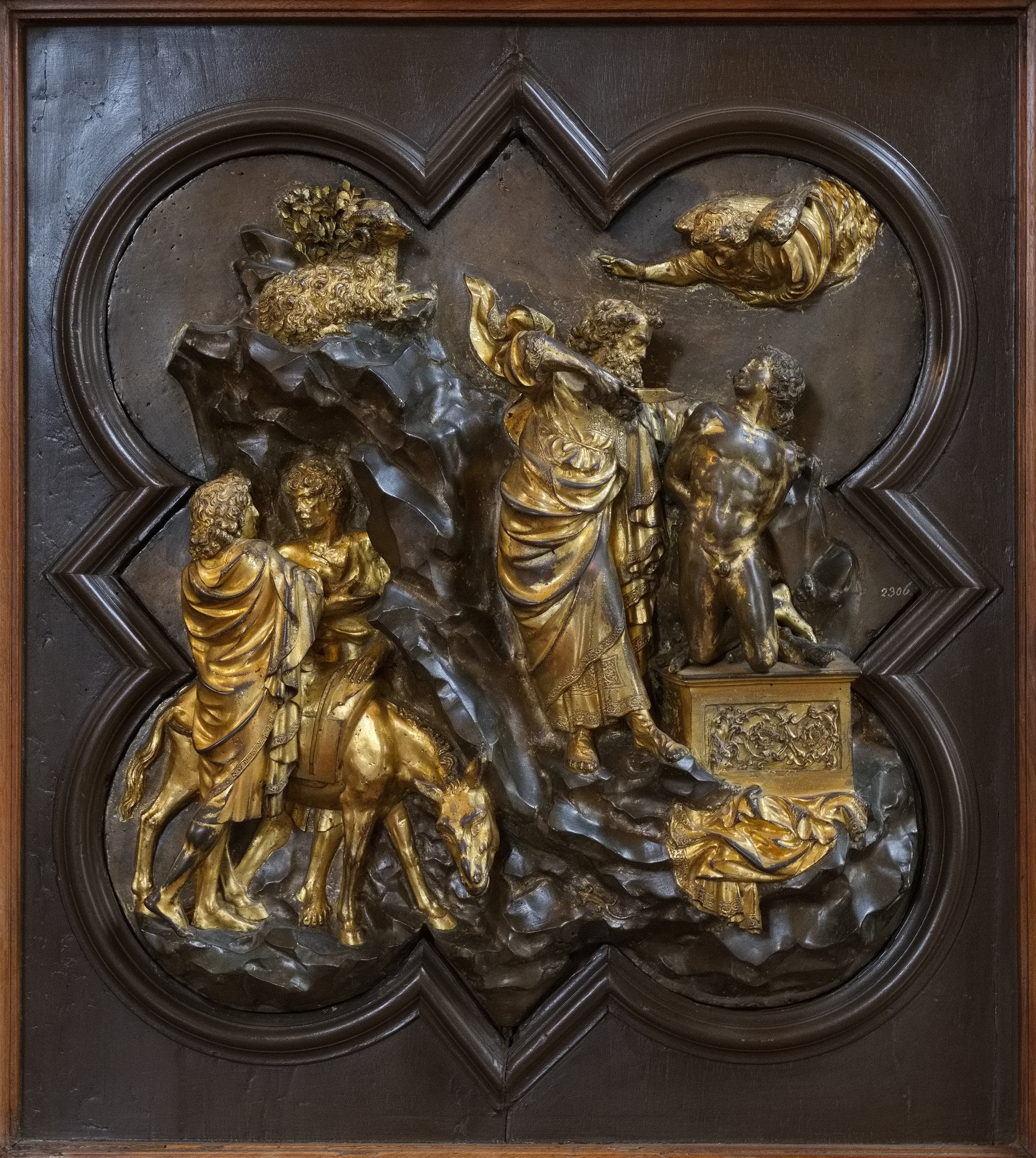
Ghiberti's Binding of Isaac

In 1401 the Arte di Calimala, responsible for the Baptistery of Saint John, announced a competition to create the north doors, sixty-five years after the completion of the first doors, the east (now south) doors by Andrea Pisano. Various artists, both Florentine and foreign, participated, including Jacopo della Quercia, from Siena, and the two young Florentine goldsmiths Lorenzo Ghiberti and Filippo Brunelleschi. They competed on the theme of the Binding of Isaac, with shapes and dimensions quite similar to those of the panels of the existing doors, and were judged the following year by a commission consisting of 30 various artisans and four consuls of the Arte di Calimala. Sources are discordant about the outcome. Ghiberti in his Commentari credited himself with a shining victory, while Brunelleschi's biographer reported of an equal victory, with the latter withdrawing at the prospect of having to cooperate with his rival.

In any case, the commission went to Ghiberti who, aided by his father and goldsmith Bartoluccio, set to work. Documentation concerning the doors is quite abundant and known mainly from seventeenth- and eighteenth-century folios. The contract of commission is dated November 23, 1403, in which it was stipulated that Lorenzo was to personally take care of the figures, trees and the like, allowing him to get some help from others including Bartoluccio. Father and son were to be paid two hundred florins a year, supervised by a three-member commission including Palla Strozzi (who was also Ghiberti's client). An average of three surveys per year was planned, with work starting on December 1, but some preliminary work delayed the start. These were probably the discussions regarding the subject matter, with the change of choice from the Old to the New Testament. The design and casting phases occupied a few years, but it was mainly the very long work of polishing and gilding that took a full two decades, with a host of helpers. A note of payment of uncertain date, between 1404 and 1407, listed Lorenzo and eleven helpers (not including Bartolo, since he was implicitly the head of the workshop with his son), among whom were Giuliano di ser Andrea, Bernardo Ciuffagni, and the young Donatello, aged about twenty; the others were Bandino di Stefano, Giovanni di Francesco, Michele di Nicolai, Michele known as “Scalcagna,” Jacopo d'Antonio da Bologna, Domenico di Giovanni, Maso di Cristofano (identified by some as Masolino) and Antonio di Tommaso (Bandino's nephew).

On June 1, 1407, since the delivery of three reliefs a year was no longer feasible, a new contract was made, in which Lorenzo is listed as workshop leader and Bartolo is among the assistants. The master agreed therein not to accept other commissions without the permission of the consuls of the Arte di Calimala and to work the wax and bronze himself, especially the chiseling of the castings, particularly for the parts that required more care, such as the nudes or the hair. There was also a clause stating that, for one year after the completion of the work, the artist was to remain at the disposal of the Arte before accepting other work: they were probably satisfied with the partial result and were already thinking about the third doors. Twenty-one assistants are listed there, including again Donatello (who, however, left the project shortly afterwards) and Paolo Uccello; a later document also lists Michelozzo's name.

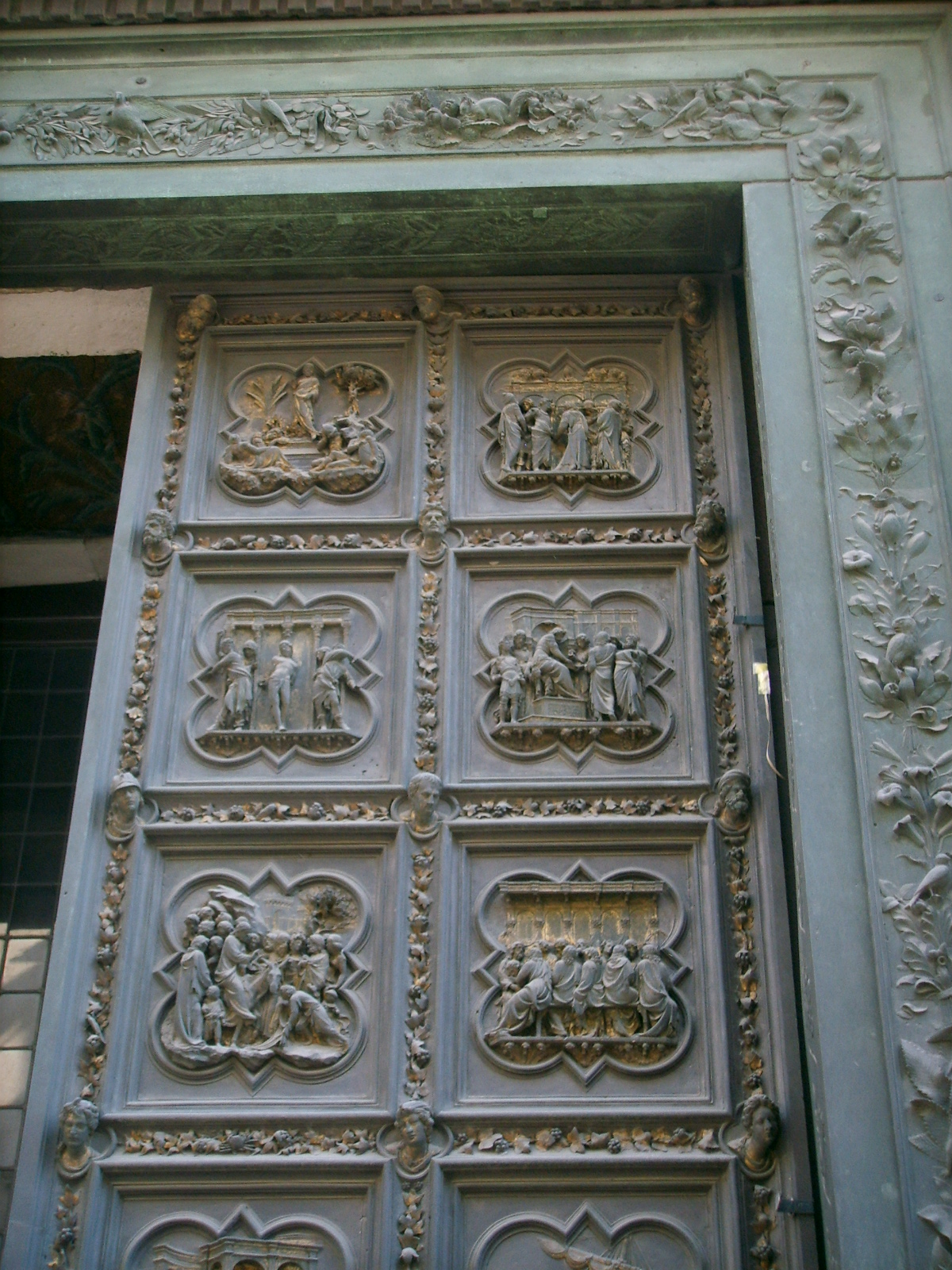
View

There is no information on how the work proceeded, but it is thought that by 1415 most of the reliefs had been cast and that the following years were needed mainly for the lengthy finishing and gilding work. The lost-wax technique had not yet been fully mastered, and using rather viscous alloys, the reliefs came out of the terracotta mold as rather rough sketches that then had to be smoothed, filled in the gaps, and provided with all the details of the finished product.

In March 1423 the partial gilding of the doors was deliberated, to increase their prestige: according to Krautheimer, the frame and jamb design (cast probably after 1424) were also created at this time. The gilding and assembly alone took a full year. On April 29, 1424, after Ghiberti had received a total fee of 22,000 florins (the information is from Ghiberti himself), the doors were placed on the east side, facing Santa Maria del Fiore, possibly causing the previous Pisano door to be moved to the south; as is known it was later moved to the north side in 1452 to make way for the Gate of Paradise.

Over time, dirt and oxidation had completely covered the gilding. During World War II, the doors were removed for protection and underwent analysis that allowed for cleaning, before being relocated in 1948.

Among the scholars who have been most concerned with the doors are Frey (1911 edition of Vasari's Lives), R. Krautheimer (1956, 1970, 1982), and the editors of the extensive 1978–1979 catalog of the Ghibertian exhibition.

Since March 2013, the doors have been undergoing restoration at the Opificio delle Pietre Dure in Florence, the restoration laboratory that for 27 years has been studying solutions for the restoration of the Gate of Paradise. Due to the Opificio's expertise, the duration of the restoration of the north doors has been estimated at about a year, after which they will be placed in the Opera del Duomo museum, and a copy will take its place on the baptistery.

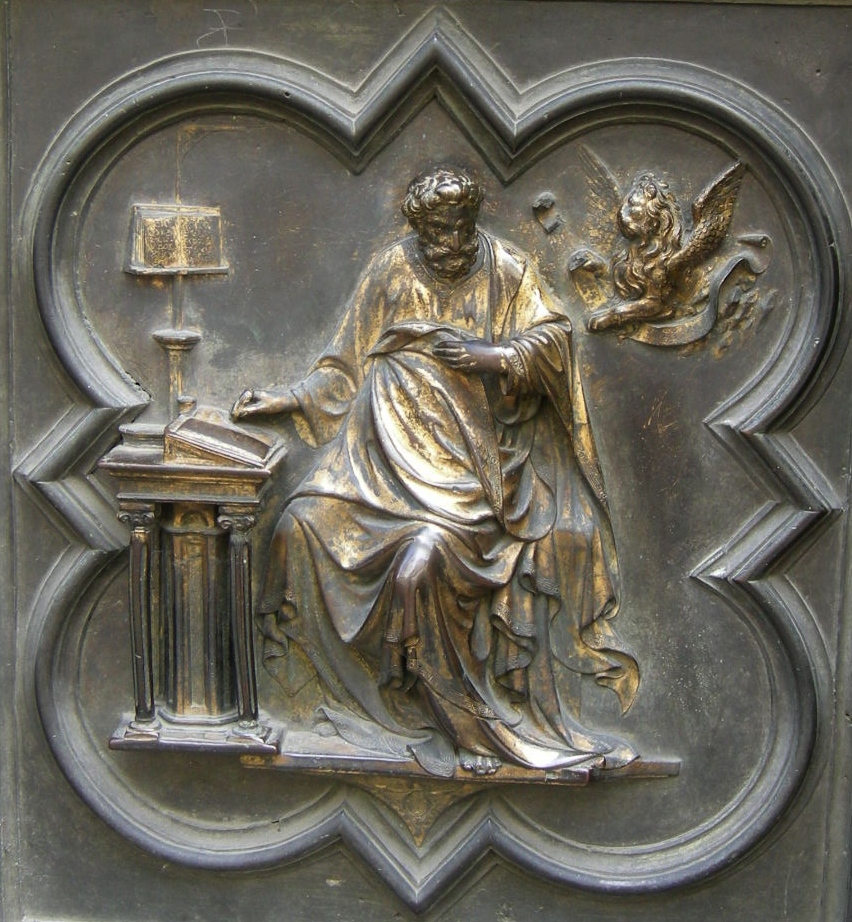
Saint Mark

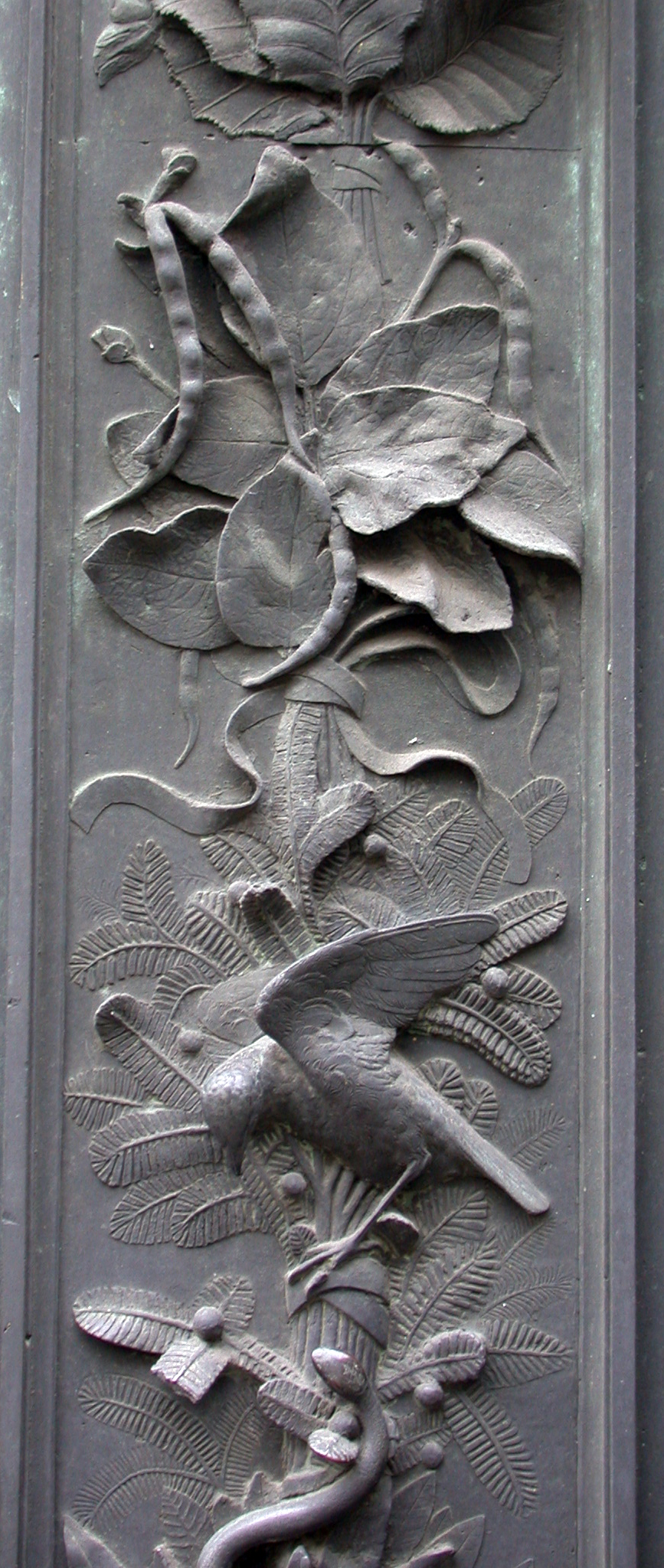
Detail of the frame

== Description ==
The doors faithfully reproduced the pattern of Andrea Pisano's door, with twenty-eight panels with a mixtilinear frame (quatrefoil), arranged in seven rows of four, two per leaf. They represent the stories of the New Testament, from the Annunciation to Pentecost, which are to be viewed from bottom to top, from left to right, starting with the third row from the bottom: this arrangement was chosen to have the dramatic climax, at the top, of the Passion stories. The first two bottom rows, on the other hand, show the four Evangelists and, below, the four Doctors of the Church.

The frame contains at the corners of the panels forty-seven heads of Prophets and Sibyls within lobed frames, six per row except for the last one at the bottom where only five are counted (the central one in the left door leaf is missing, probably so as not to disturb the closing of the doors); between each panel are then plant motifs (ivy), with various small animals. These animals probably had an amuletic value since they were harmful to crops and thus it was hoped, by relying on Christ, to keep them away from crops and avoid famine. They were probably modeled by making casts from nature on the bodies of insects, crustaceans, amphibians and reptiles, according to a technique already described by Cennino Cennini but known only from this work. Also in the jambs and architrave, hastily completed by Ghiberti's assistants after the doors were moved to the north side (the original frame in fact remained on the east side) are bronze garlands with various plants, animated by birds, reptiles and mammals pecking at fruits or perching among the branches, again with superstitious meanings.

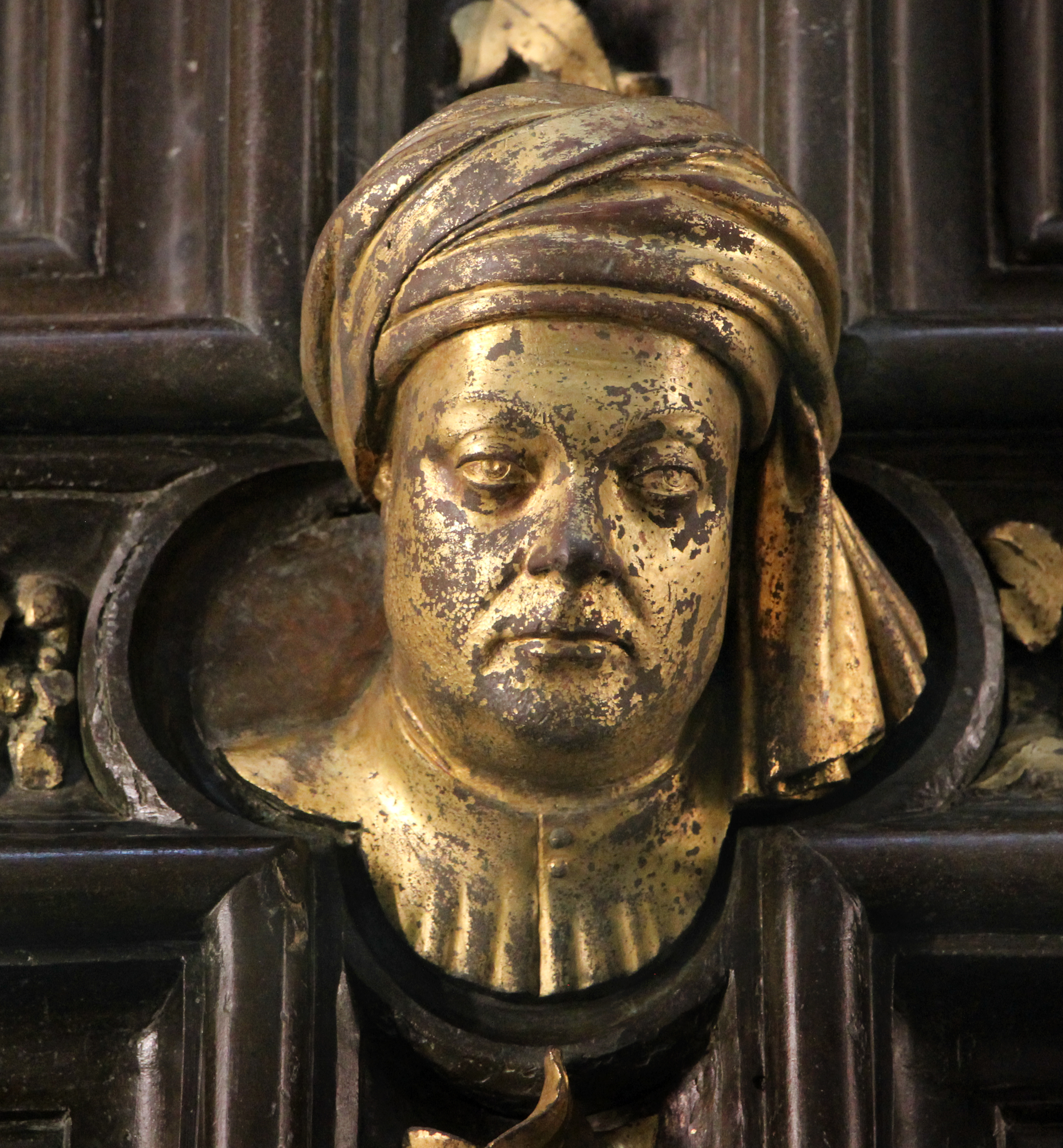
Self-portrait of Ghiberti on the door

The small head in the center of the left wing, fifth row from the top, represents the artist's self-portrait, wearing a turban, probably the first realistic portrait of the Renaissance.

== Style ==
Ghiberti's sources of inspiration were varied, from classical art to the Tuscan Gothic of the first decades of the fourteenth century (Nicola and Giovanni Pisano, Arnolfo di Cambio), from goldsmithing to the miniature from beyond the Alps and Lombardy, and also the model provided by Andrea Pisano's other door. The result was particularly successful due to the deep assimilation of these models, the artist's confident style and his inexhaustible creative imagination.

In general, the linear elegance of a late Gothic style dominates, in which each figure is fully admirable both in its own right and in the overall composition. The figures are prominent within the Gothic quatrefoils, but more characterized (compared to the other fourteenth-century door) from a spatial and perspective point of view, with acute physiognomic individuation, especially in the heads.

There are numerous formal cross-references between the figures, balletic tones and refined hanchements, to which is added the perfect rendering of animals, plants, objects and architecture. In the lower panels, the care with which the pieces of furniture near the Evangelists and Doctors are rendered stands out, their clothes flowing with solemnity but also with a real poise that never lapses into excessive mannered artificiality. The lively poeticism of the whole, a pleasing mediation between tradition and Brunelleschi's impetuous revolution is taken up shortly afterwards by Donatello.

The plant shoots of the frames and the heads represented a change from the rosettes and lion heads of Andrea Pisano's door.

== Reconstruction ==
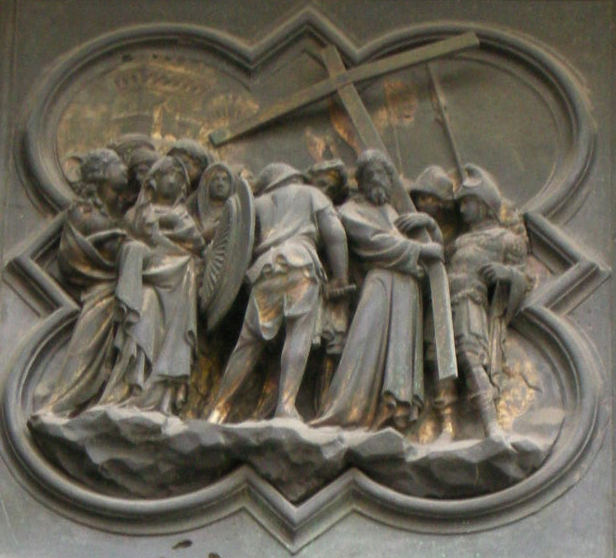
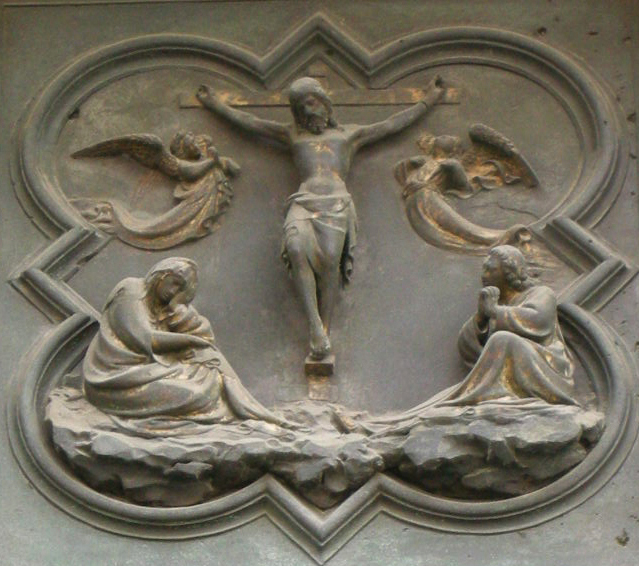
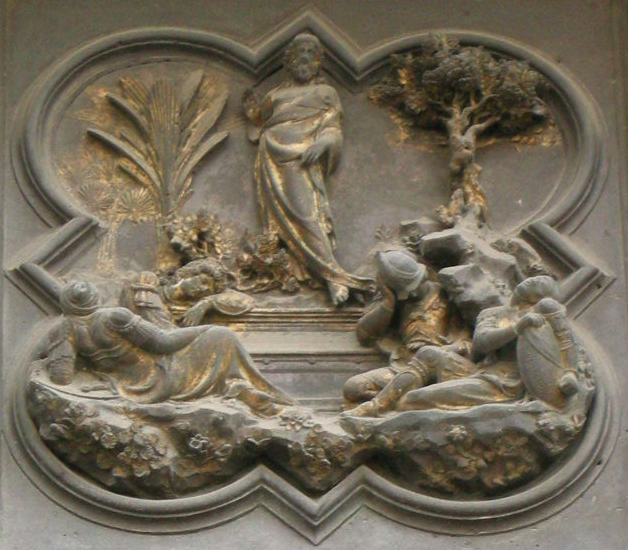
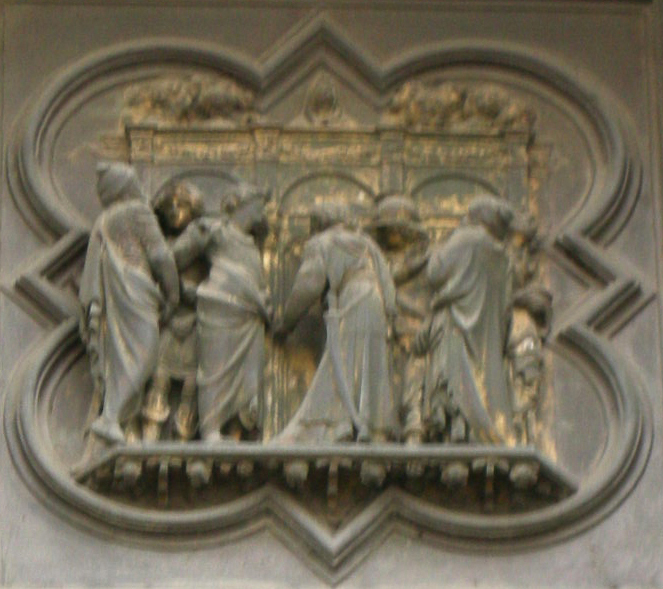
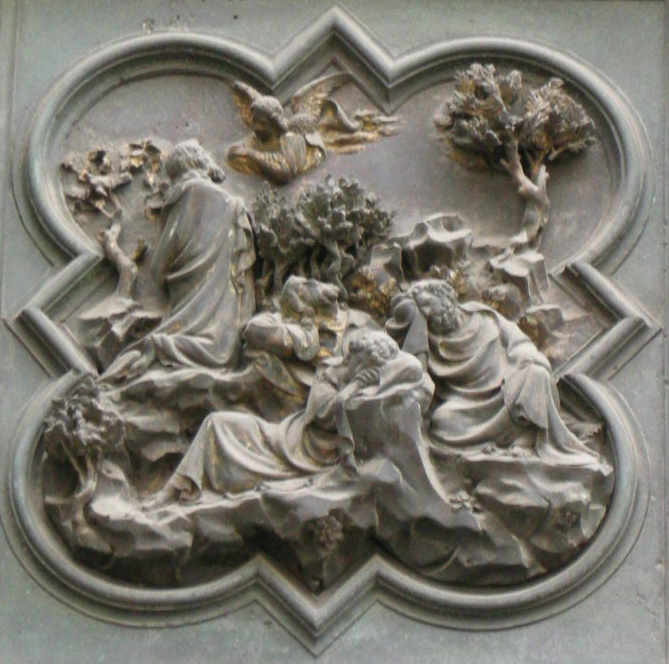
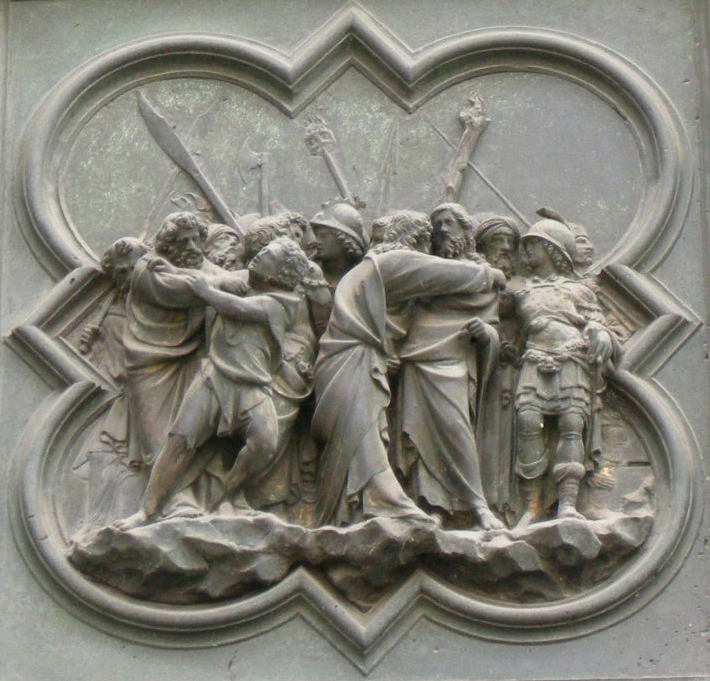
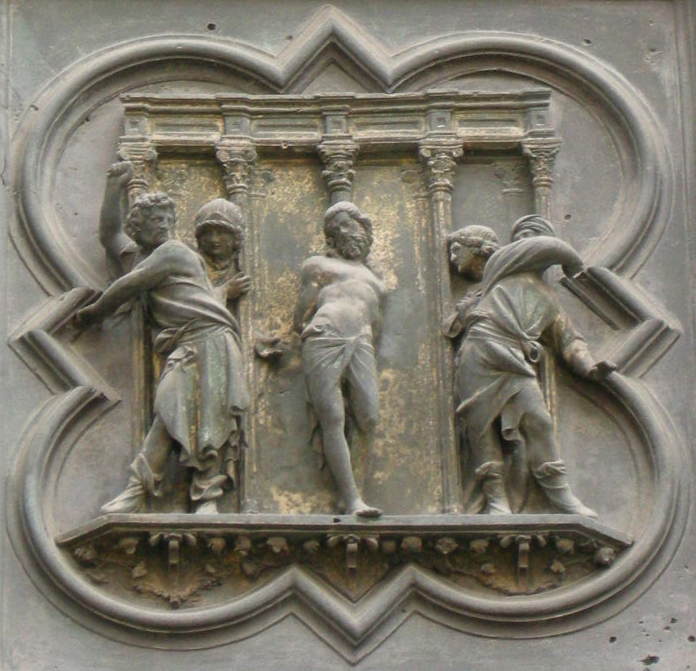
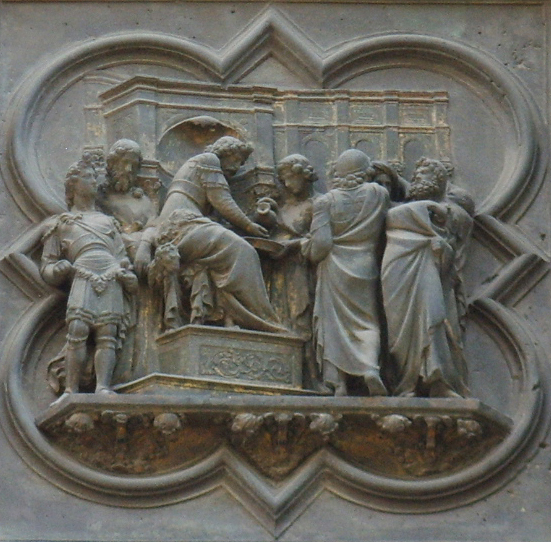
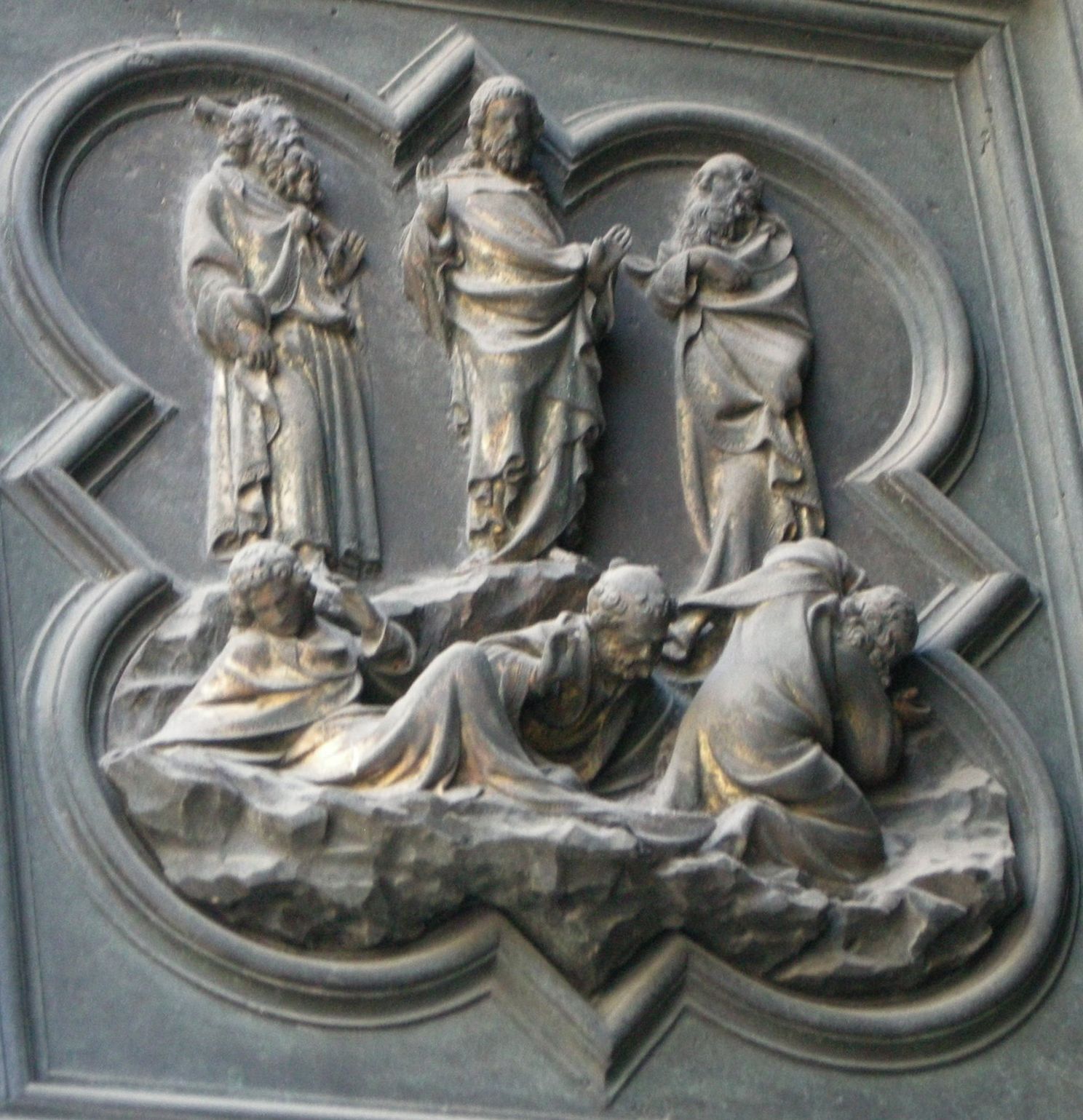
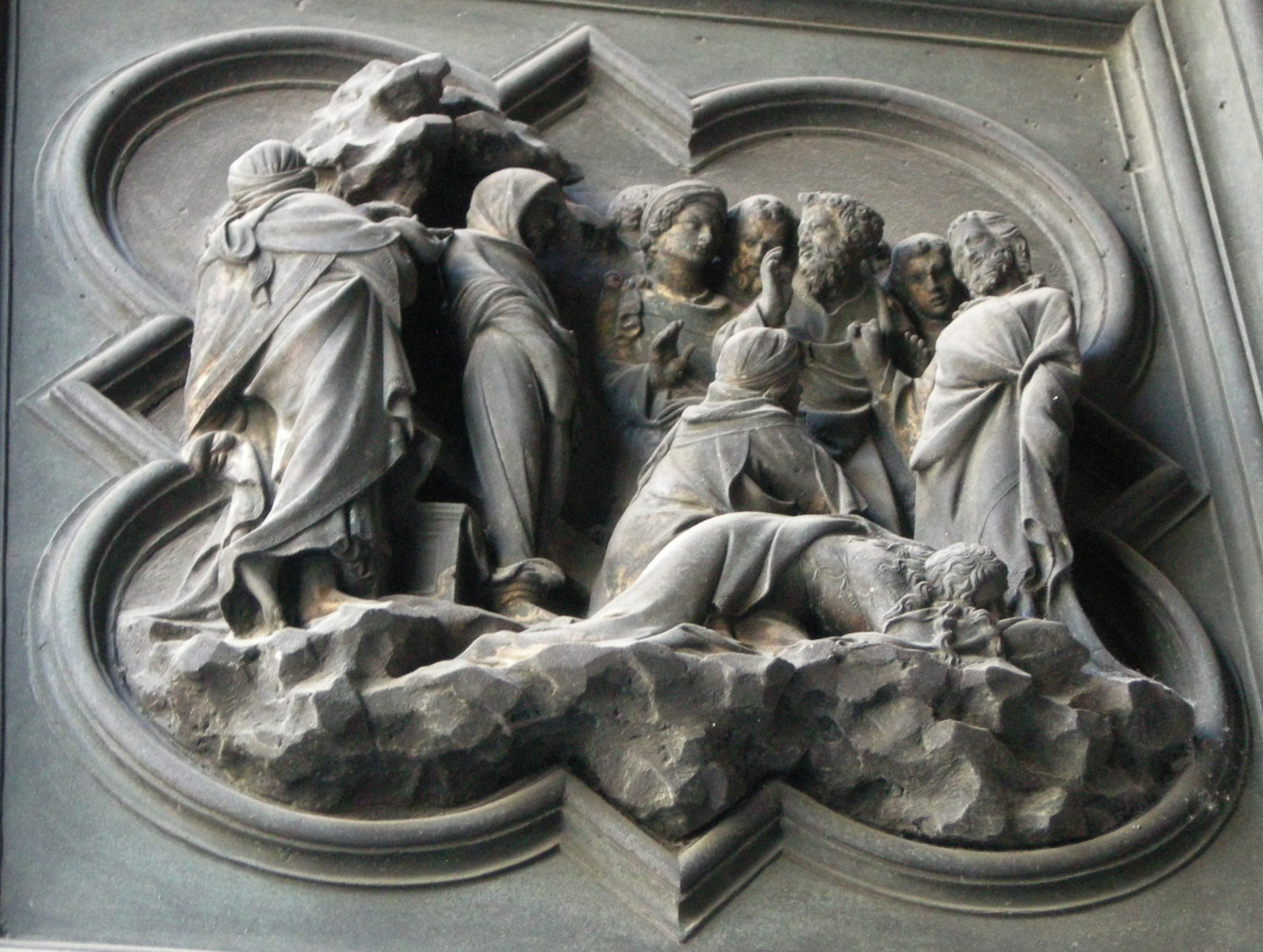
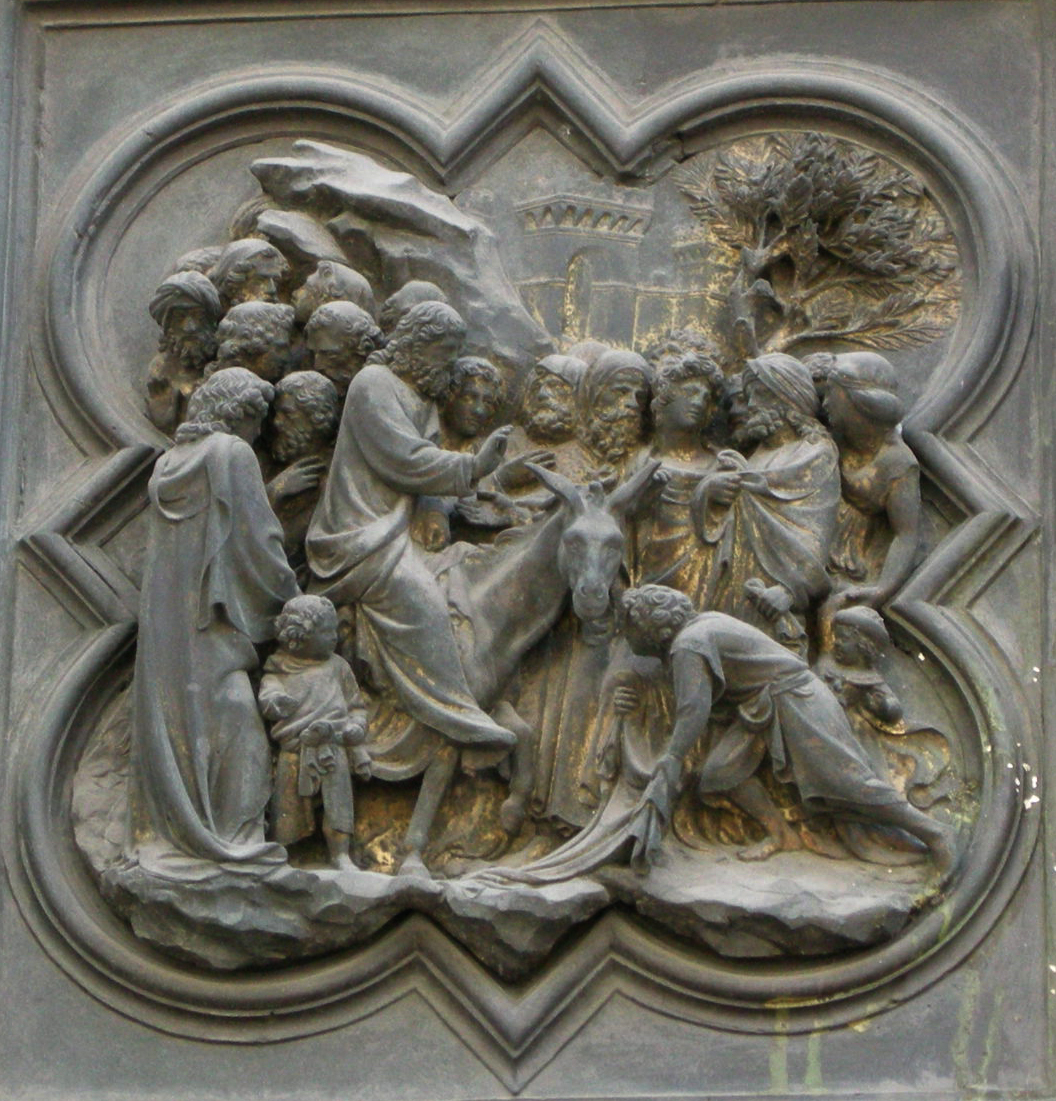
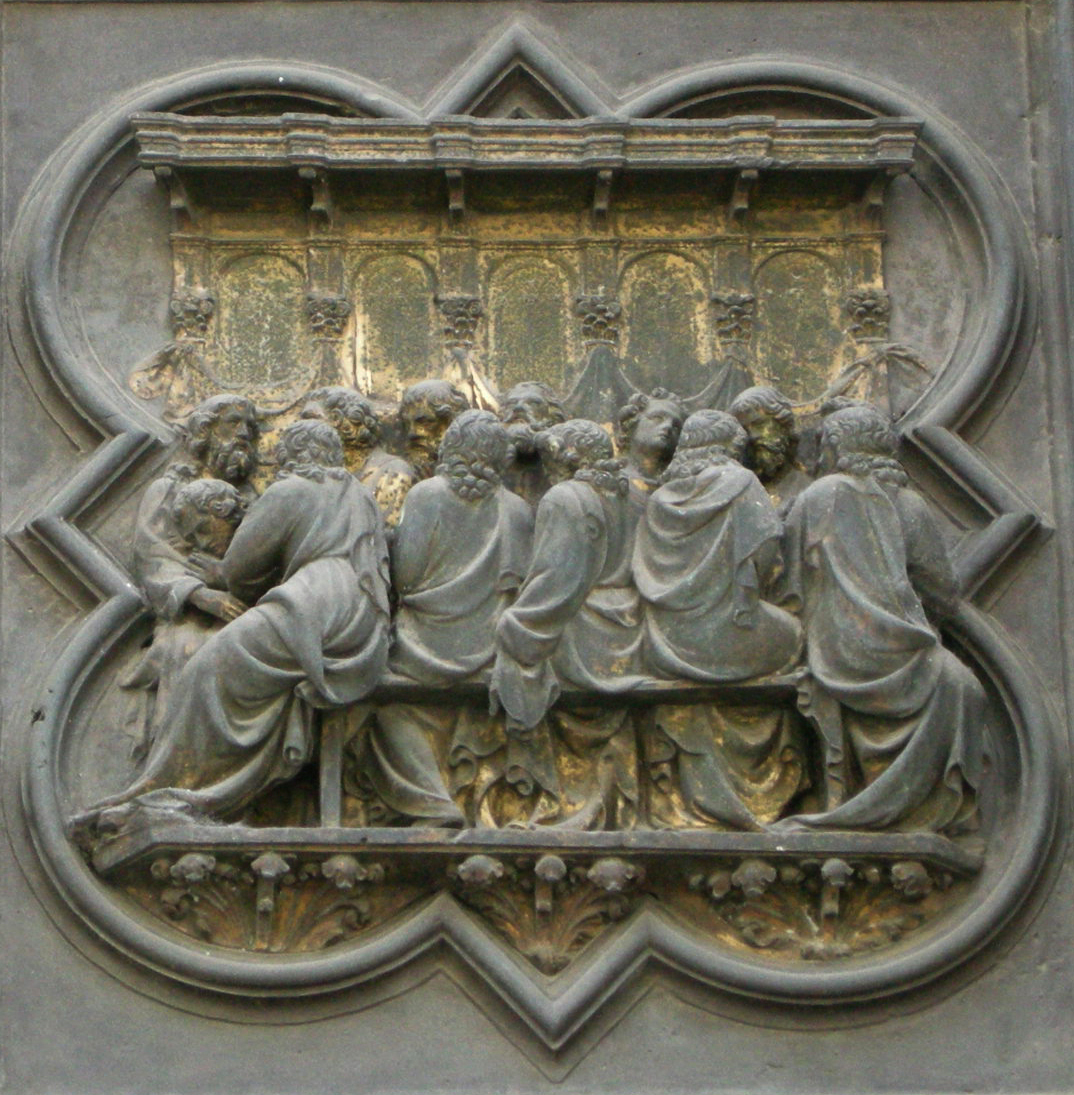
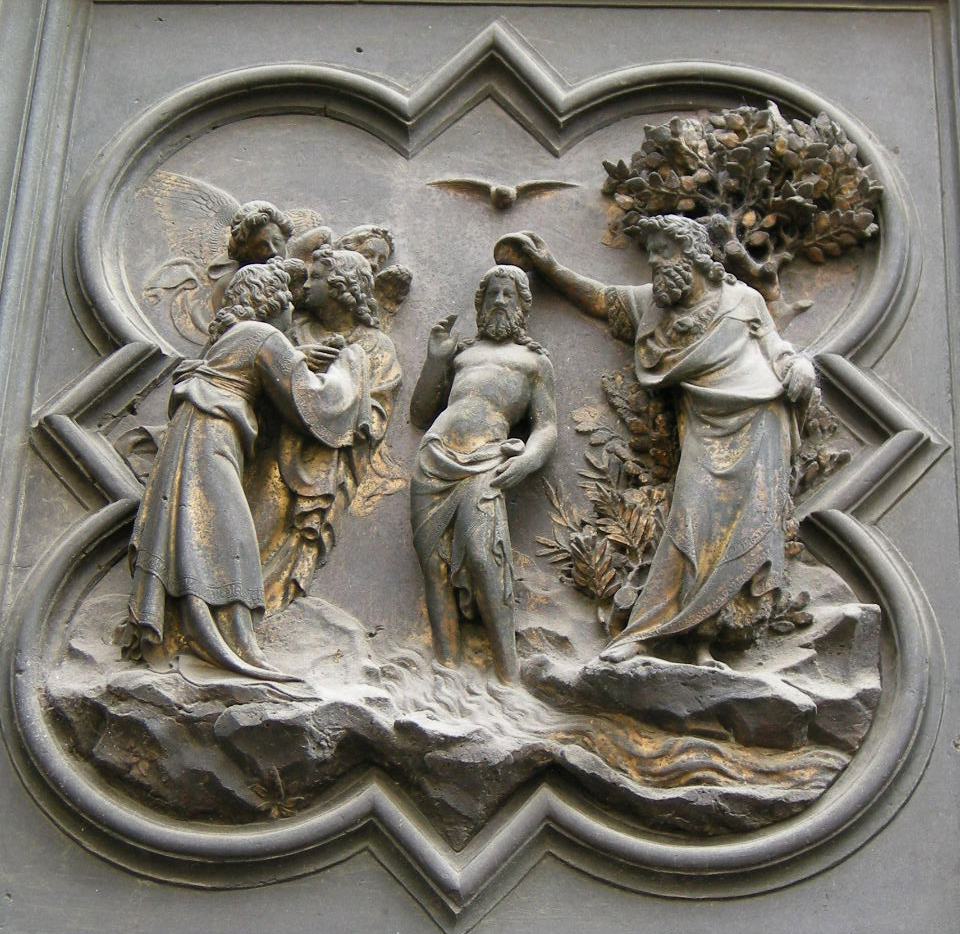
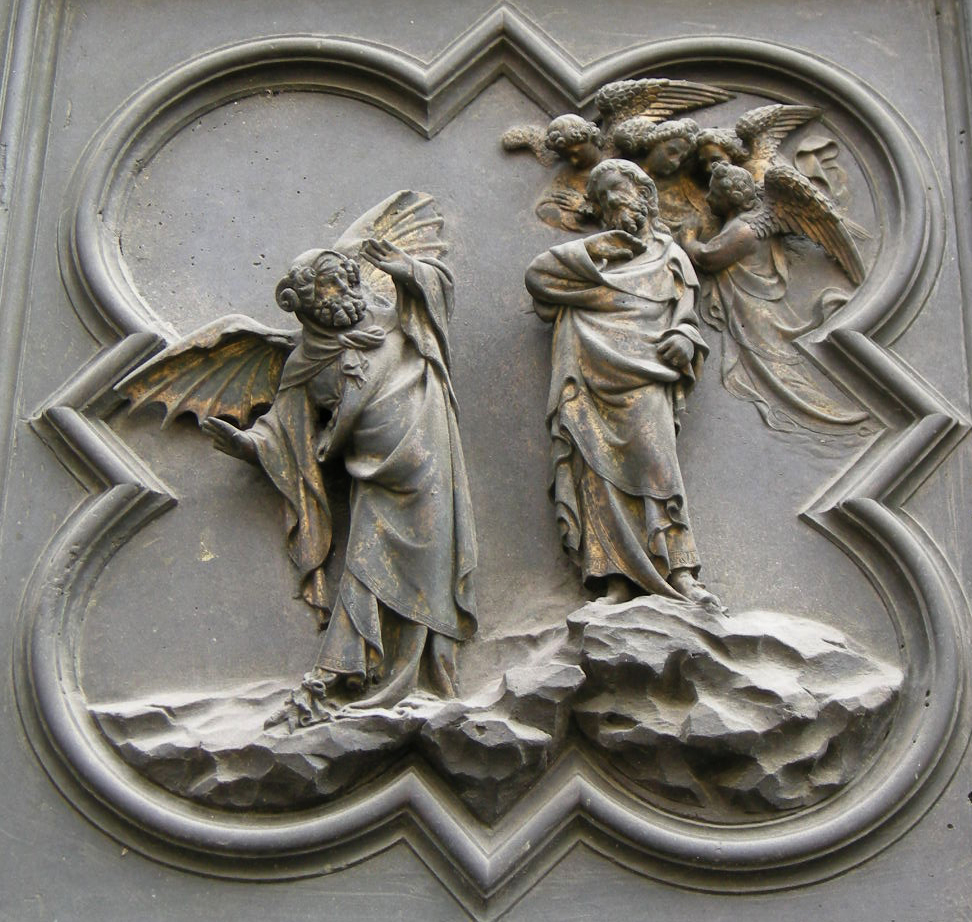
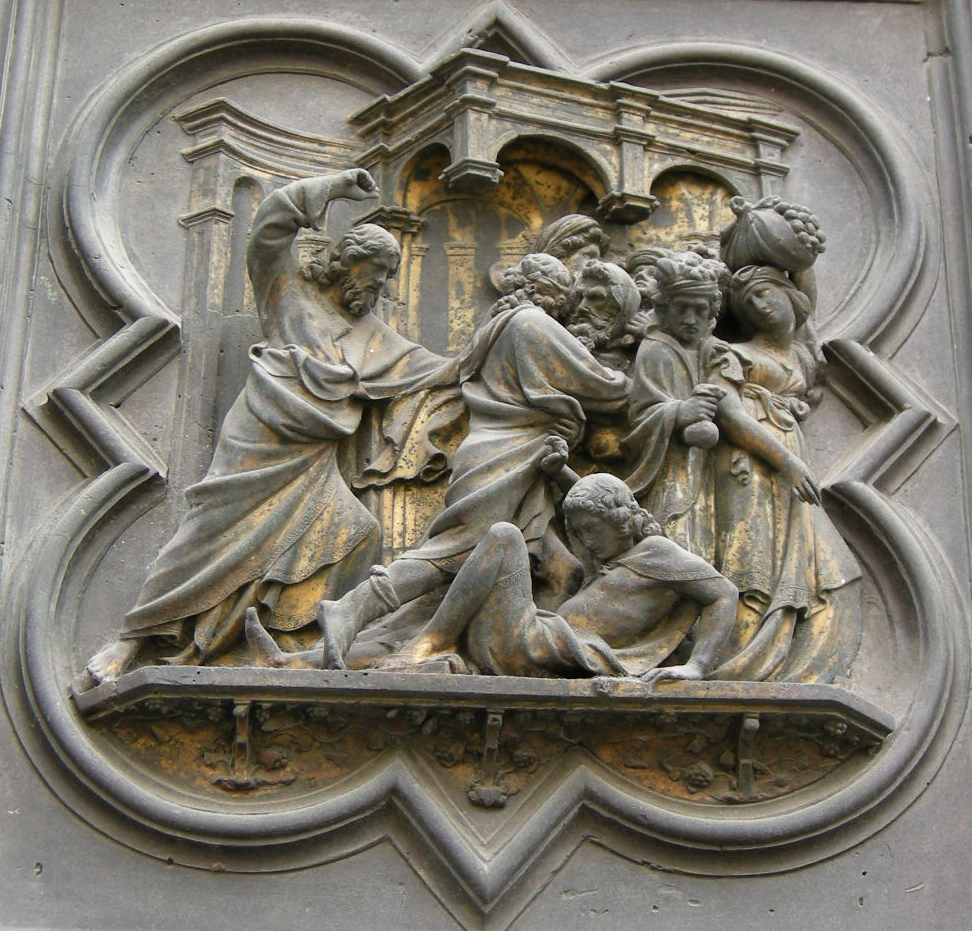
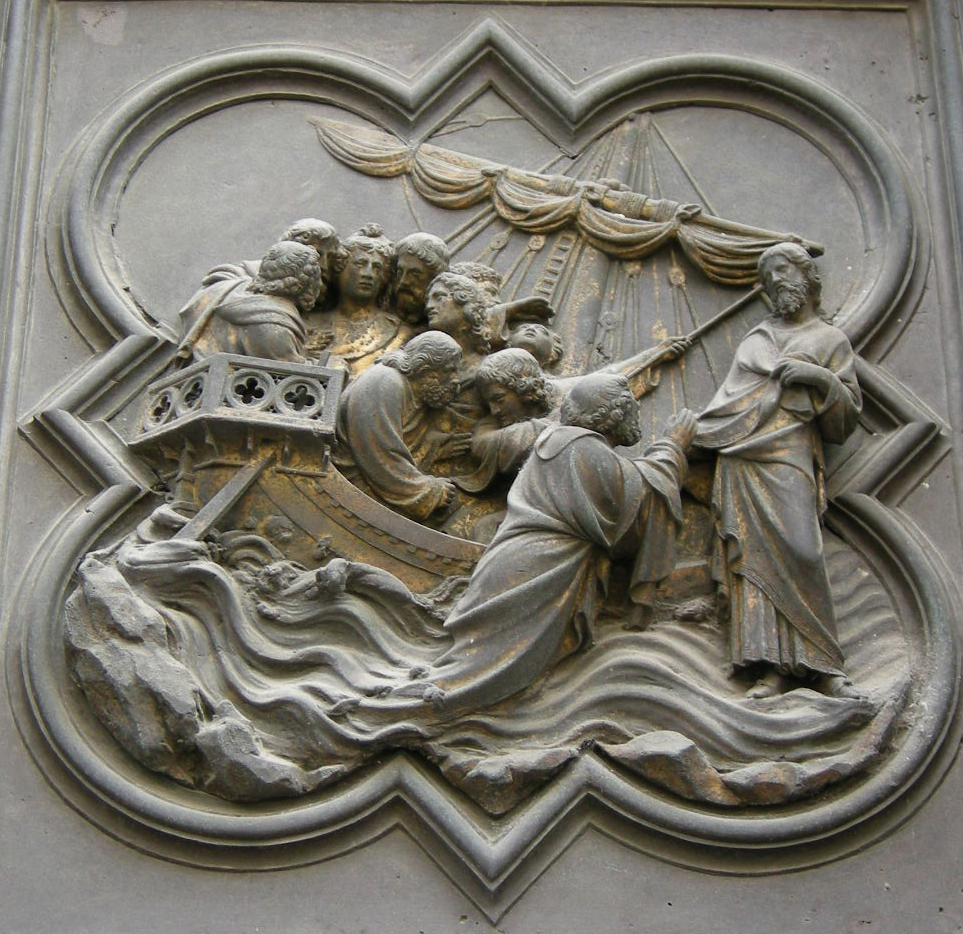
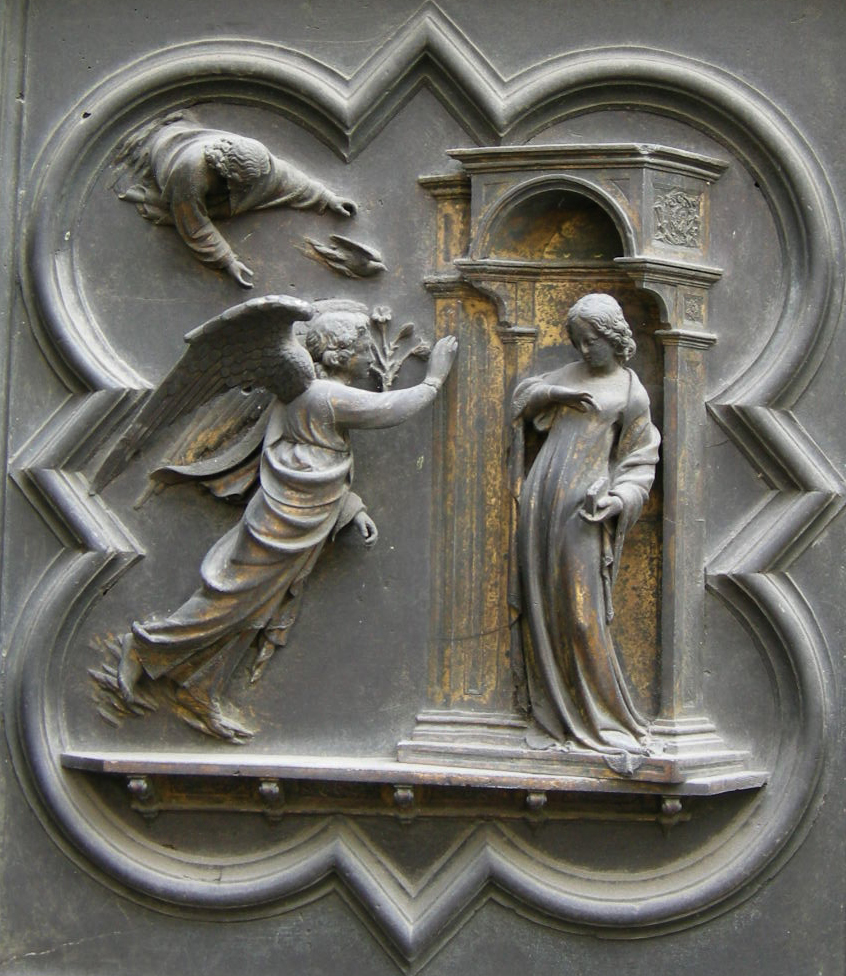
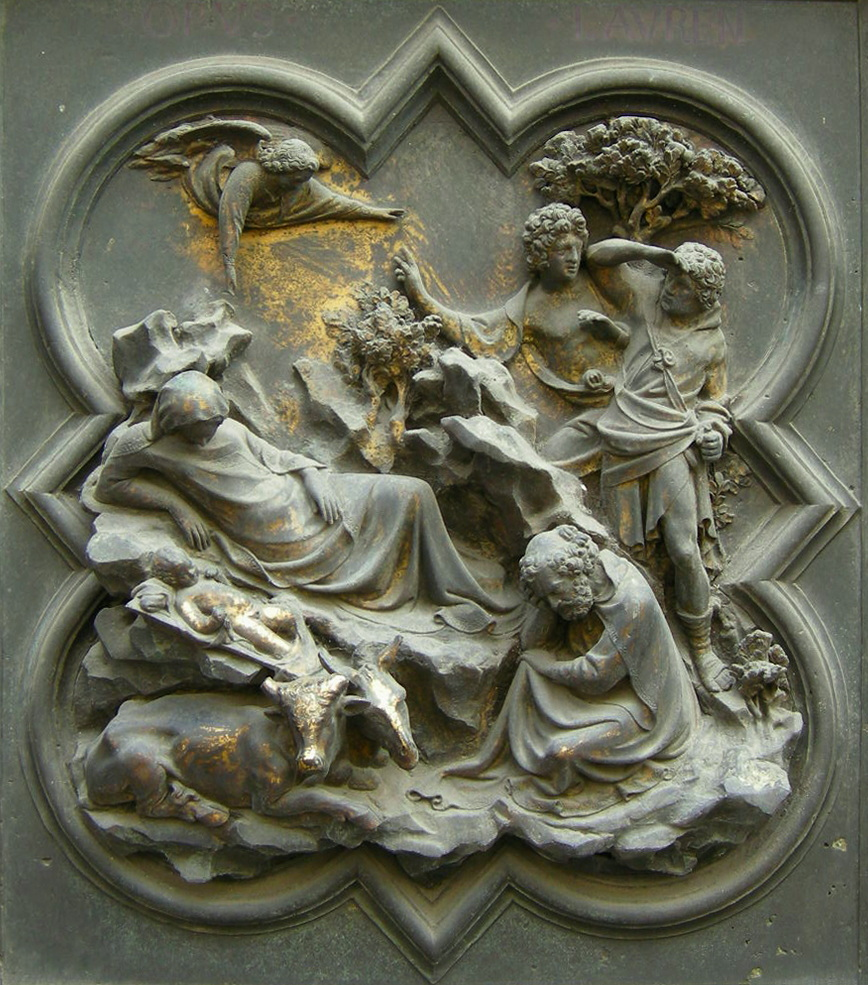
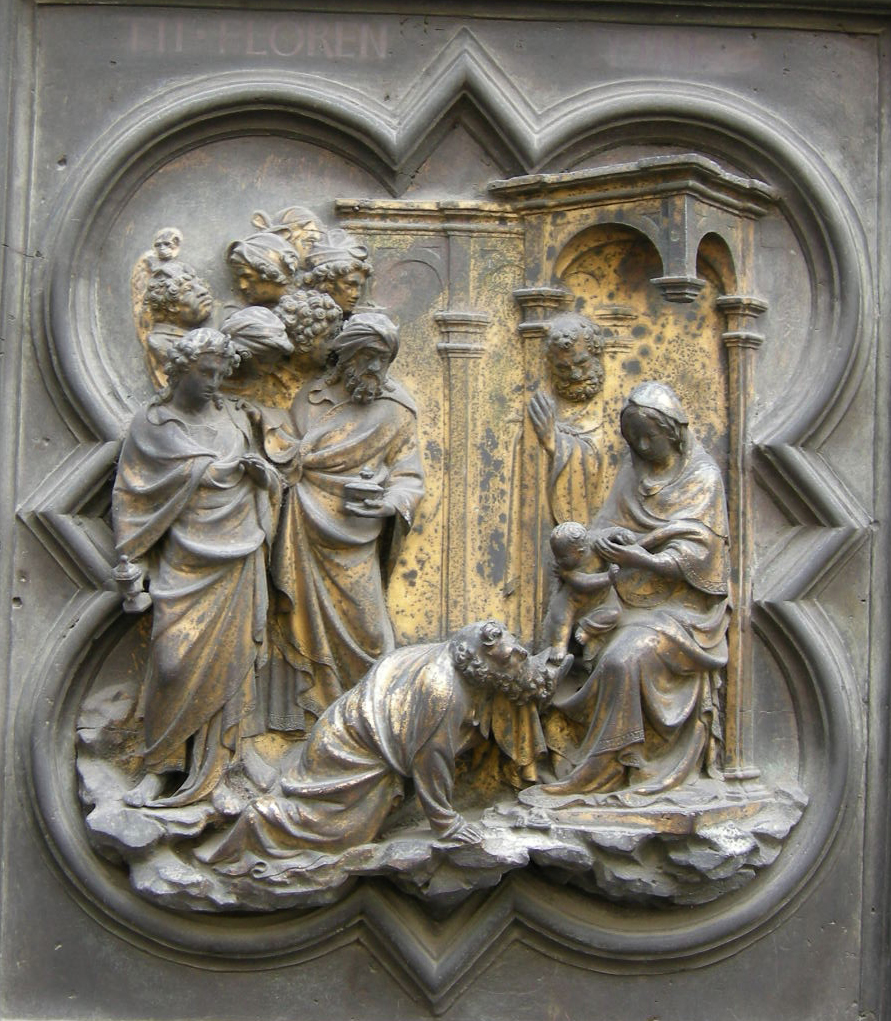
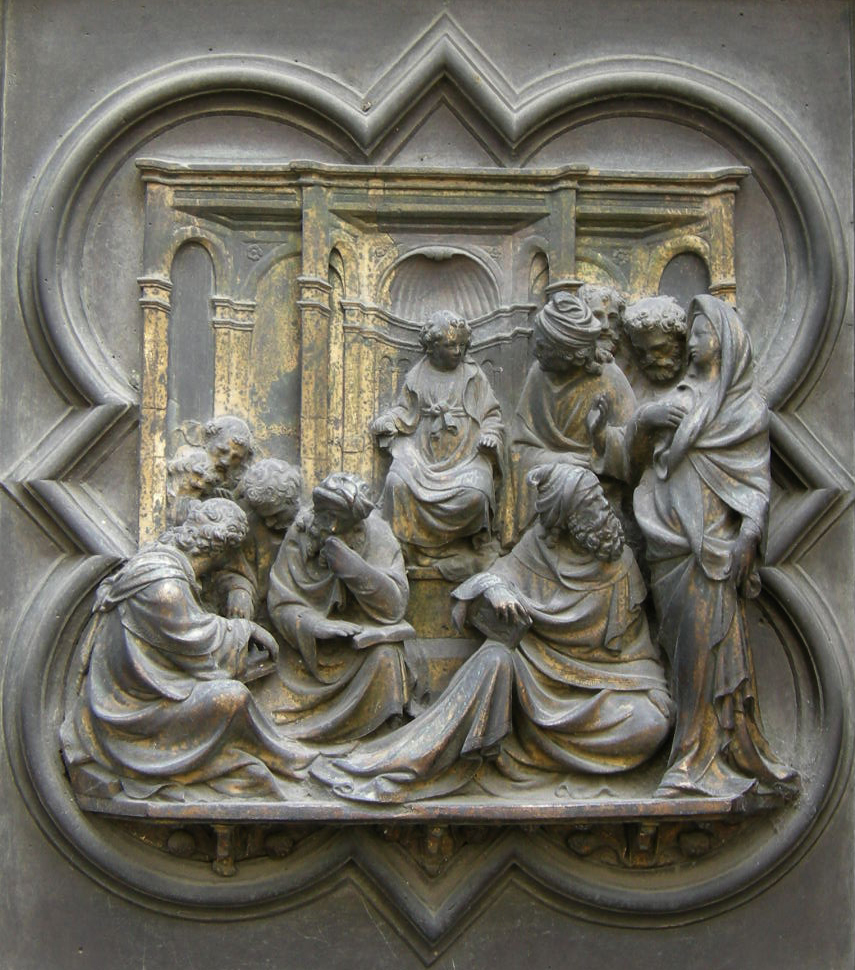
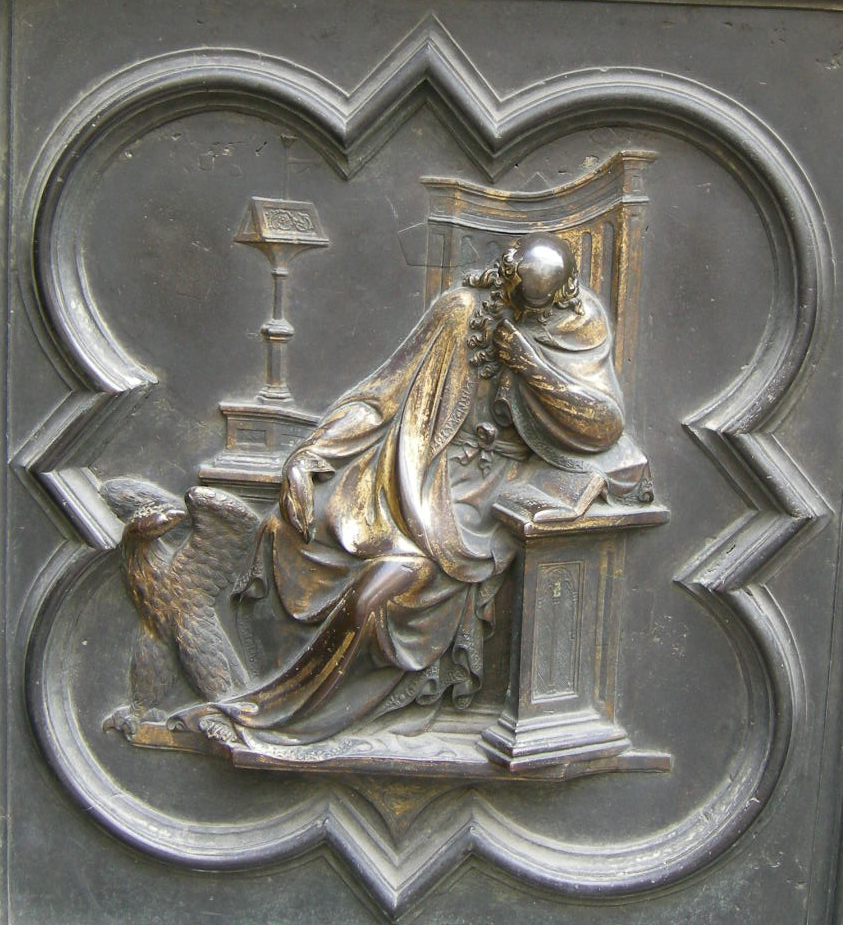
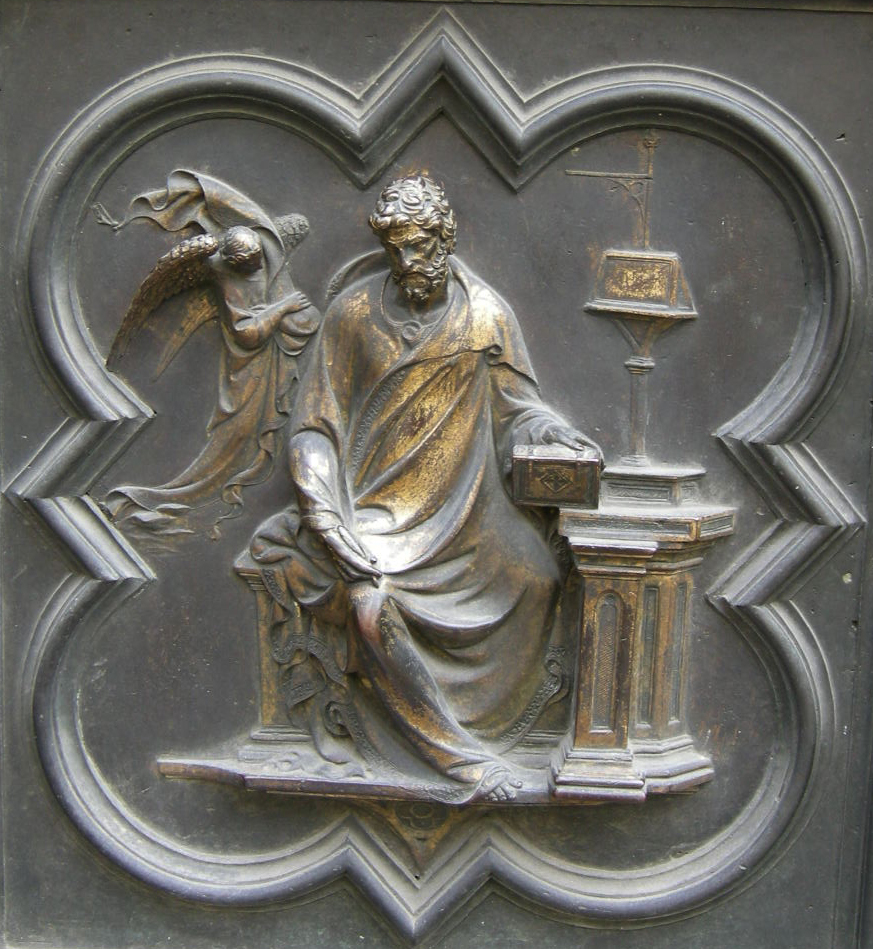
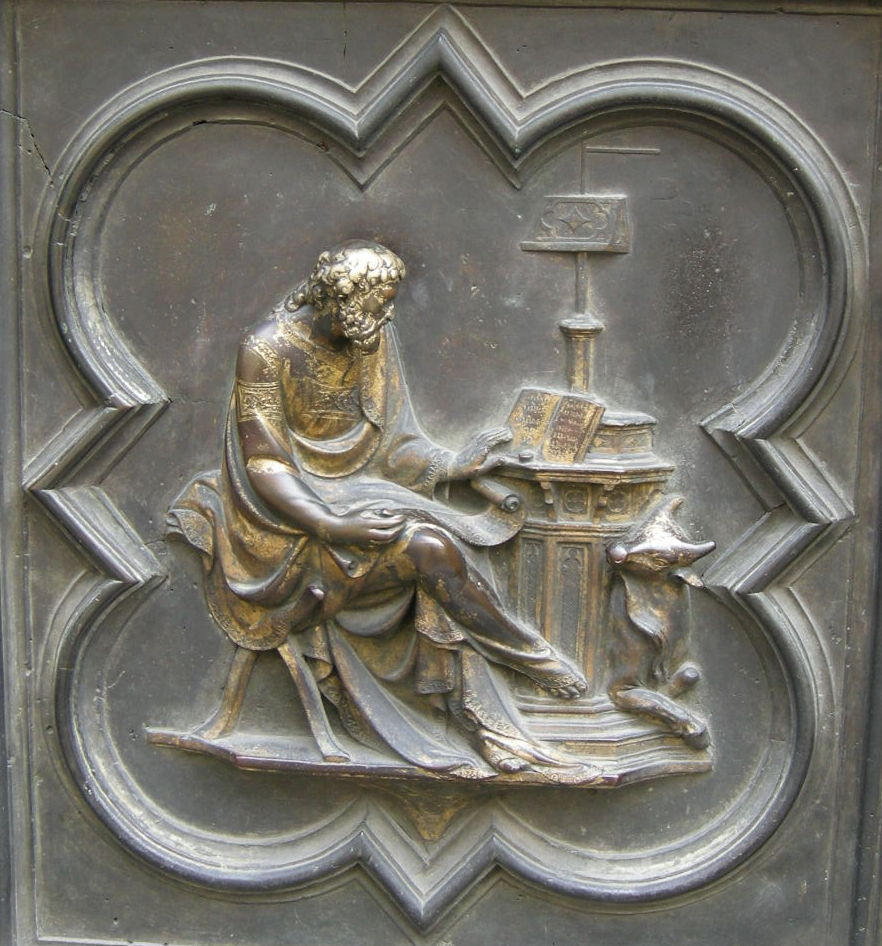
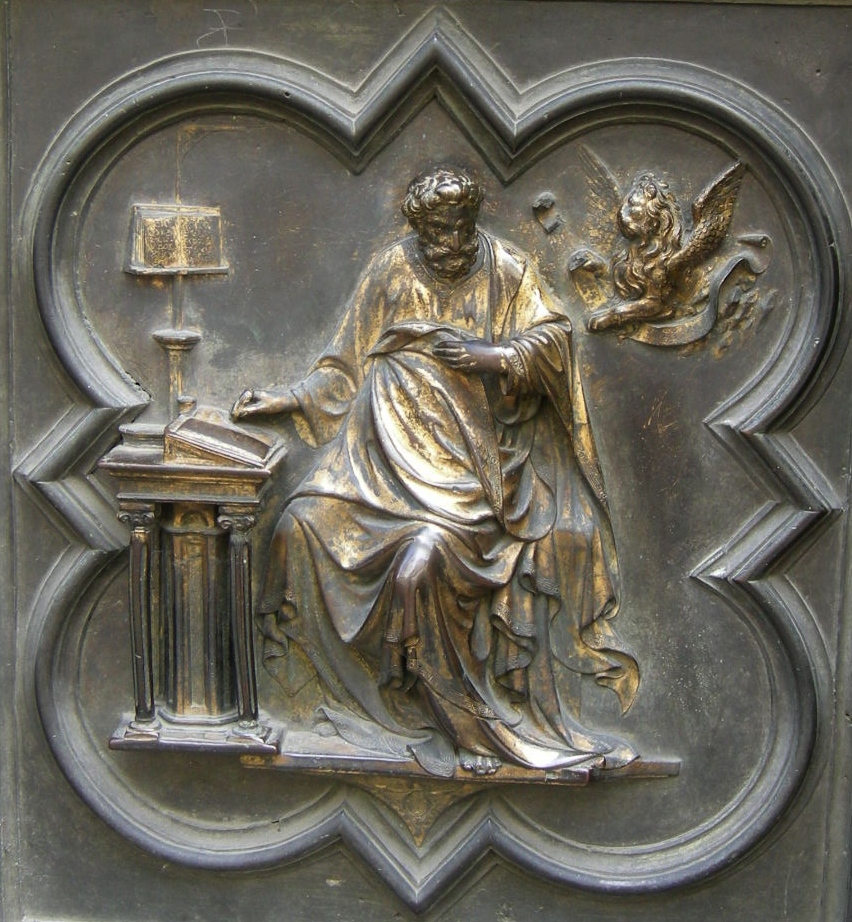
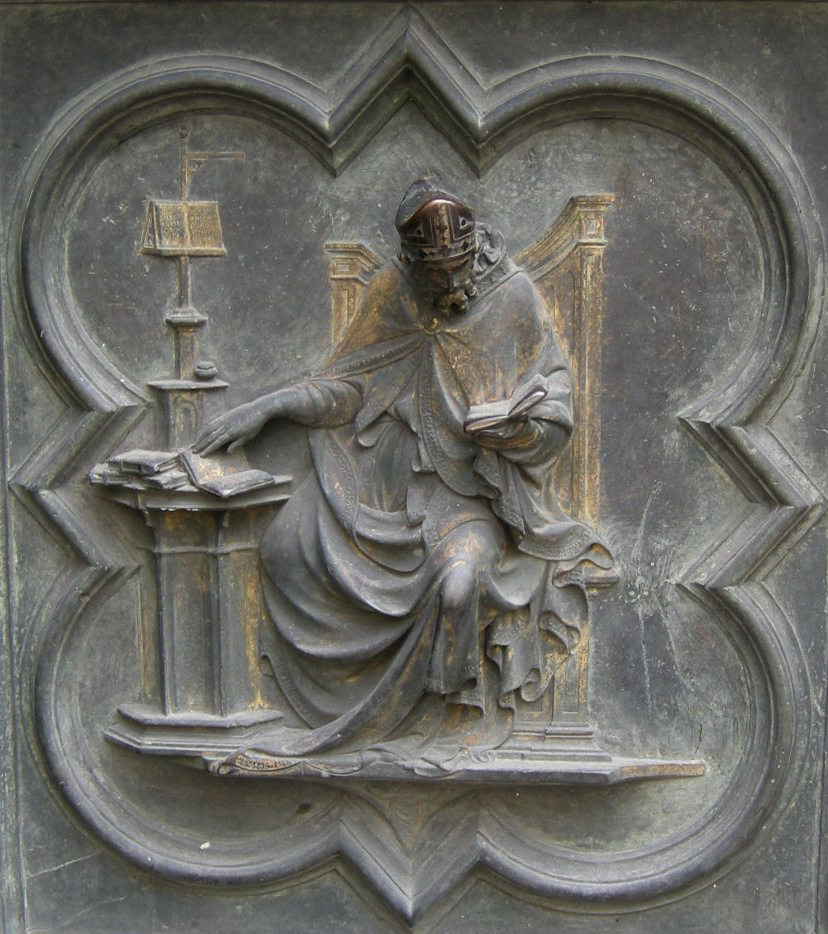
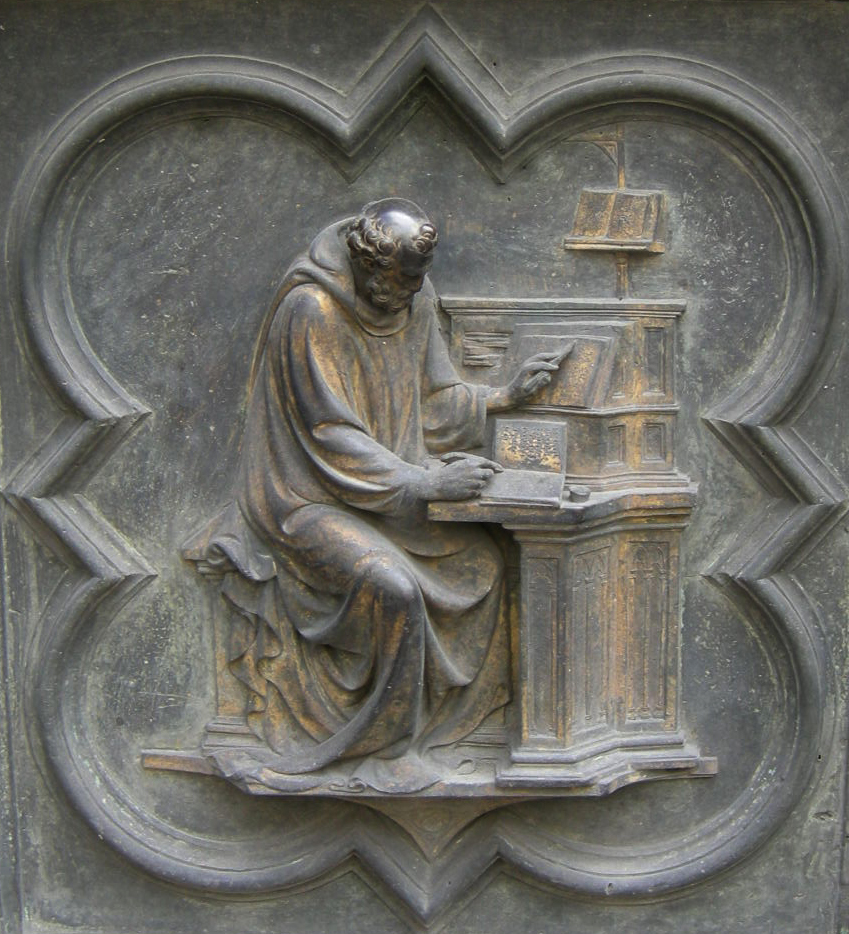
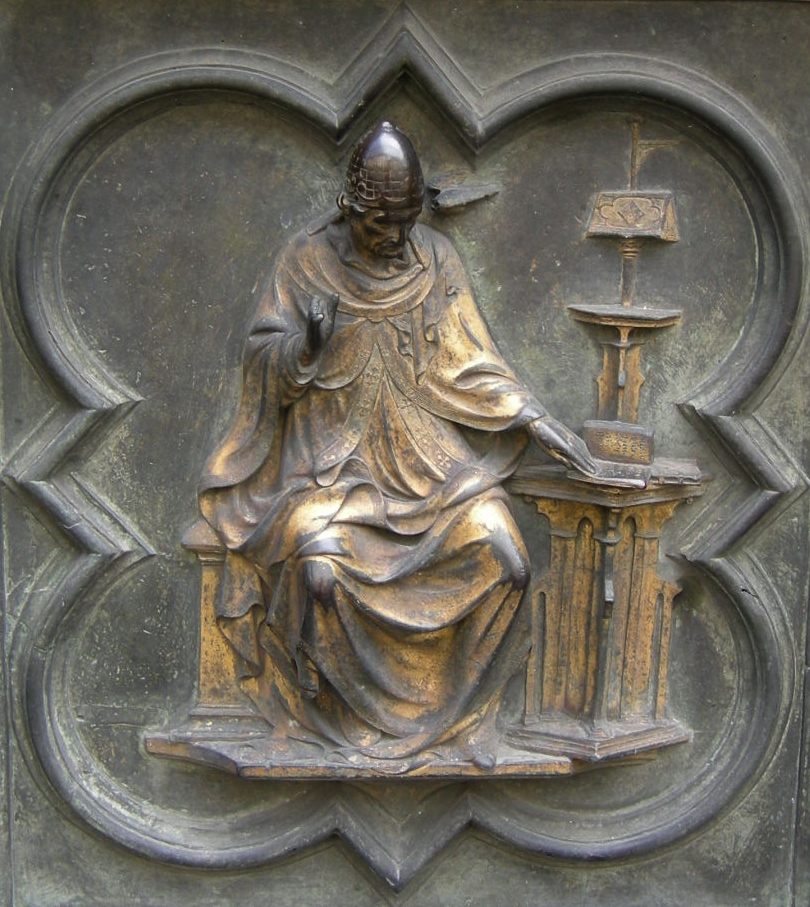
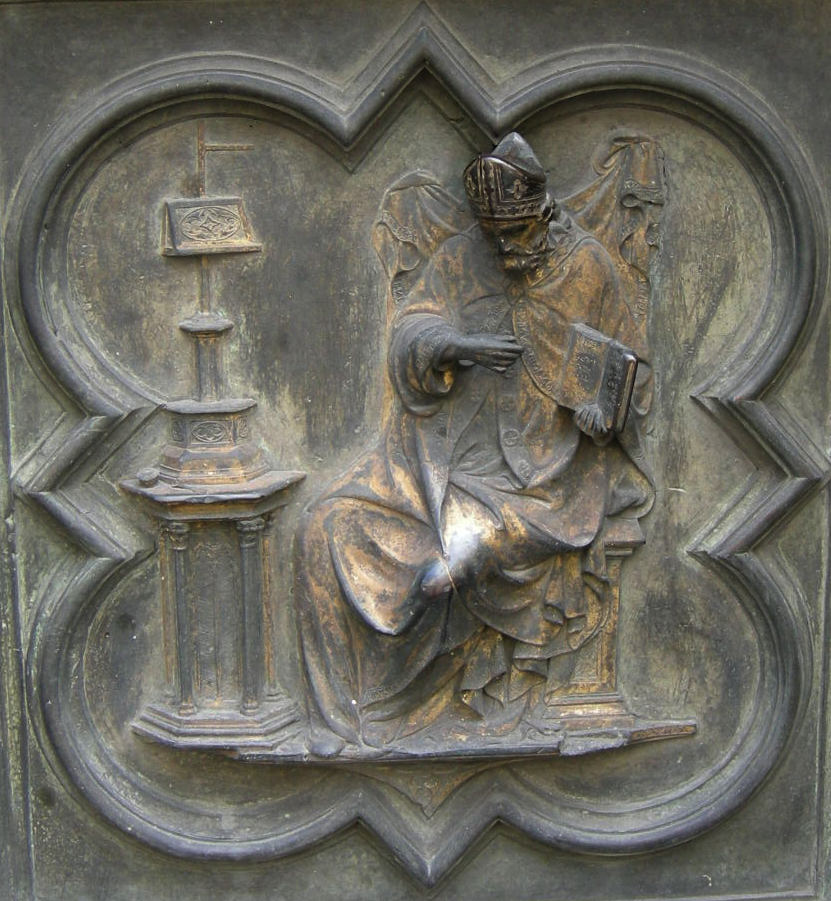
17. Ascent to Calvary
13. Oration in the Garden
09. Transfiguration
05. Baptism of Christ
01. Annunciation
21. St. John
25. St. Ambrose

18. Crucifixion
14. Arrest of Jesus
10. Resurrection of Lazarus
06. Temptation in the desert
02. Nativity
22. St. Matthew
26. St Jerome

19. Resurrection
15. Flagellation
11. Entrance to Jerusalem
07. Expulsion of the merchants
03. Adoration of the Magi
23. St. Luke
27. St. Gregory

20. Pentecost
16. Jesus before Pilate
12. Last Supper
08. Jesus walks on water
04. Argument in the Temple
24. St Mark
28. St Augustine

List of scenes

1. Annunciation
2. Nativity
3. Adoration of the Magi
4. Argument with the doctors
5. Baptism
6. Temptations in the desert
7. Expulsion of the merchants from the temple
8. Jesus walks on water and saves Peter
9. Transfiguration
10. Resurrection of Lazarus
11. Entrance to Jerusalem
12. Last supper
13. Vigil in the Garden of Olives
14. Arrest of Jesus
15. Flagellation
16. Jesus before Pilate
17. Ascent to Calvary
18. Crucifixion
19. Resurrection
20. Pentecost
21. St John
22. St Matthew
23. St Luke
24. St Mark
25. St Ambrose
26. St Jerome
27. St Gregory
28. St Augustine

== See also ==
- Florence Baptistery

== Bibliography ==
- Brunetti, Giulia (1966). Ghiberti. Firenze: Sansoni.
- De Vecchi, Pierluigi; Cerchiari, Elda (1999). I tempi dell'arte. Vol. 2. Milano: Bompiani. pp. 59–60. ISBN 88-451-7212-0.
- AA.VV. (2007). Guida d'Italia, Firenze e provincia "Guida Rossa". Milano: Touring Club Italiano.
