= Bronze medal =

Medal awarded to the third-place finisher of a competition

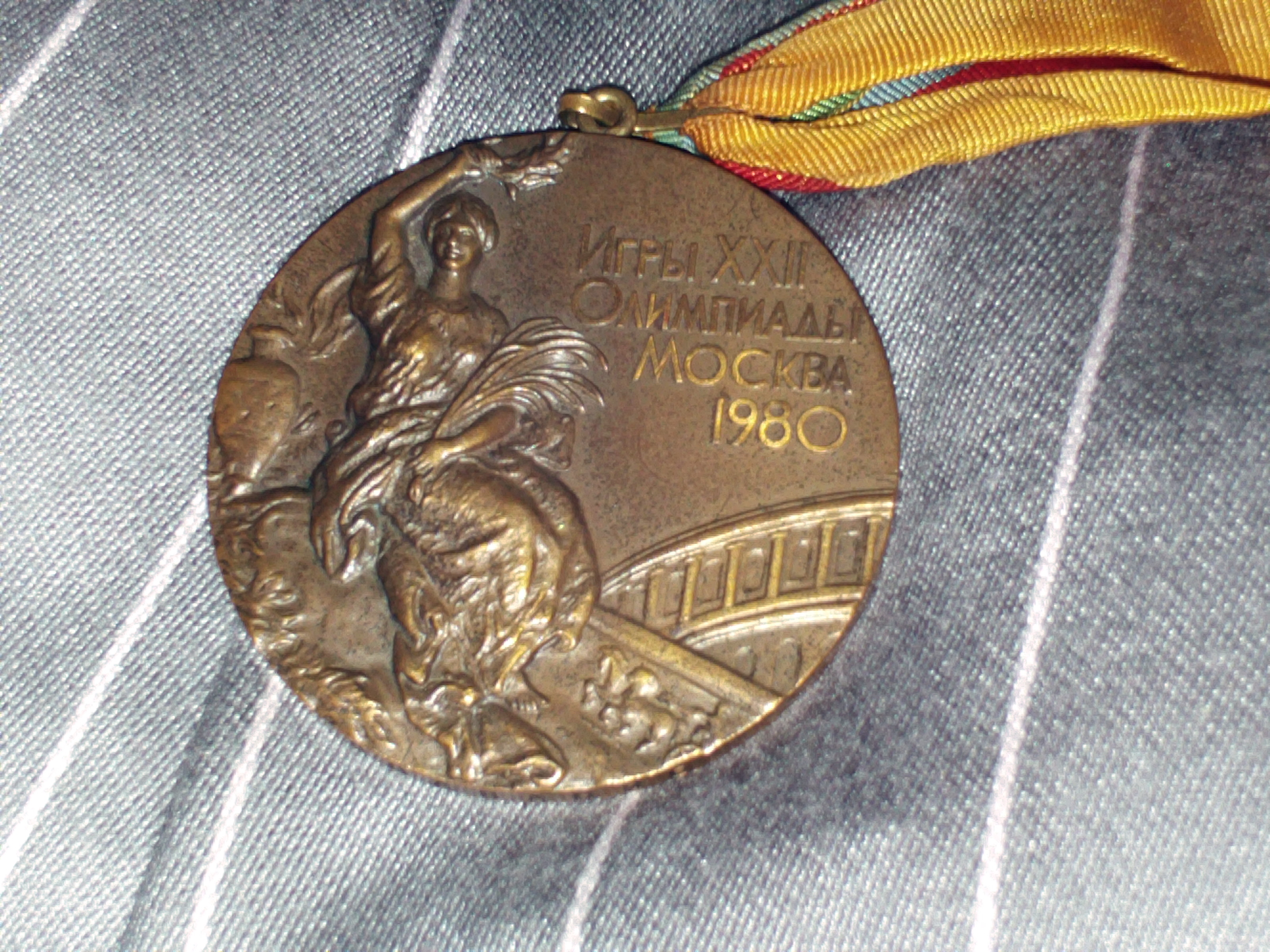
A bronze medal from the 1980 Summer Olympics

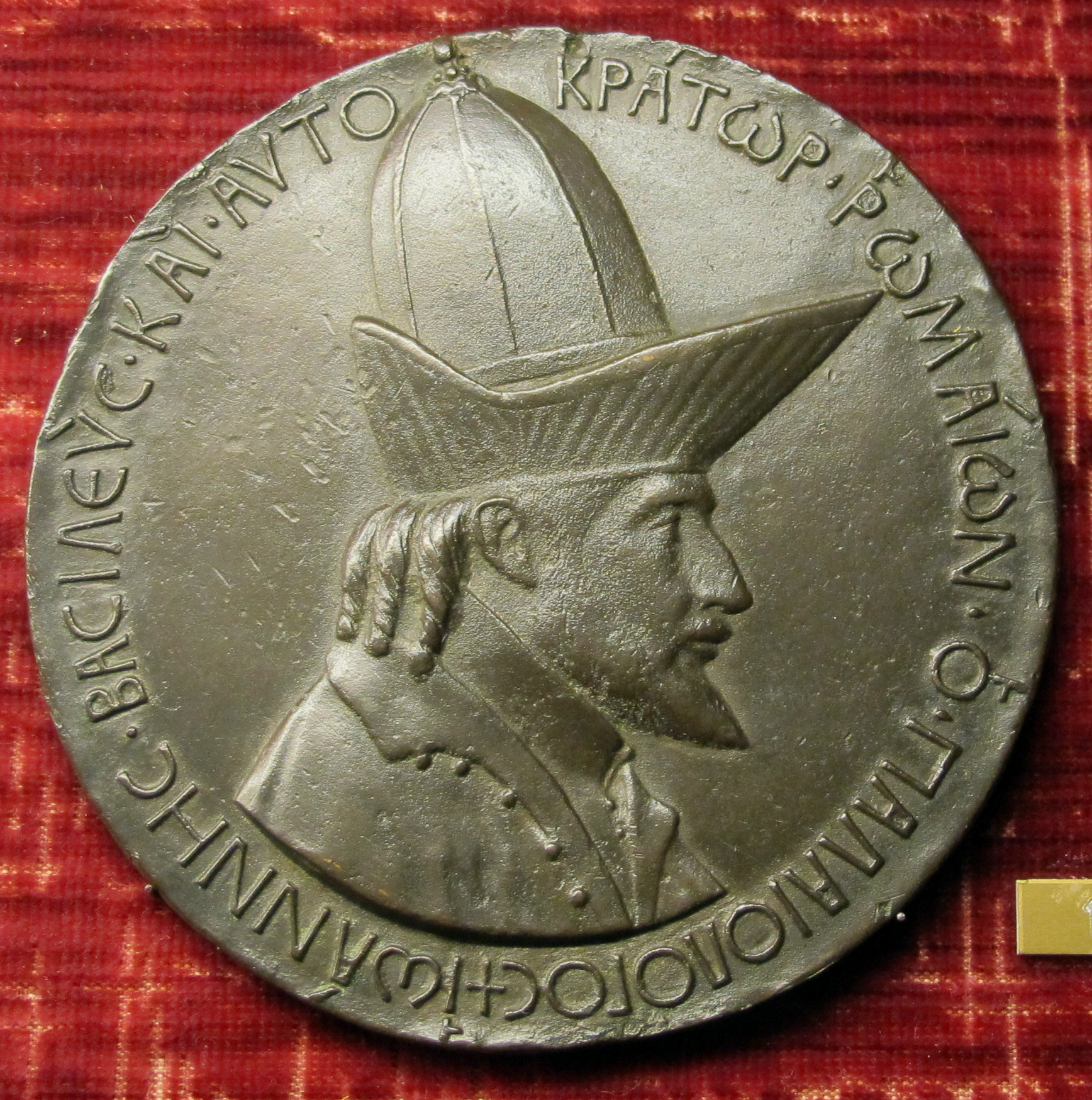
The bronze commemorative Medal of John VIII Palaeologus by Pisanello (1438), made in various metals, but usually in bronze

A bronze medal in sports and other similar areas involving competition is a medal made of bronze awarded to the third-place finisher of contests or competitions such as the Olympic Games, Commonwealth Games, etc. The outright winner receives a gold medal and the second place a silver medal. More generally, bronze is traditionally the most common metal used for all types of high-quality medals, including artistic ones. The practice of awarding bronze third place medals in the Olympic Games began at the 1904 Olympic Games in St. Louis, Missouri, before which only first and second places were awarded.

== Olympic Games ==
Minting Olympic medals is the responsibility of the host city. From 1928–1968 the design was always the same: the obverse showed a generic design by Florentine artist Giuseppe Cassioli with text giving the host city; the reverse showed another generic design of an Olympic champion. From 1972–2000, Cassioli's design (or a slight reworking) remained on the obverse with a custom design by the host city on the reverse. Noting that Cassioli's design showed a Roman amphitheatre for what was originally a Greek game, a new obverse design was commissioned for the Athens 2004 Games. Winter Olympics medals have been of more varied design.

In a few tournament sports, such as boxing, judo, taekwondo and wrestling, two bronze medals are awarded in each event – one for each eliminated semi-finalist or for the winners of the repechage brackets.

== Psychological study ==
In 1995, a study was carried out by social psychologists Victoria Medvec, Scott Madey and Thomas Gilovich on the effects of counterfactual thinking on the Olympics. The study showed that athletes who won the bronze medal were significantly happier with their winning than those athletes who won the silver medal. The silver medalists were more frustrated because they had missed the gold medal, while the bronze medalists were simply happy to have received any honors at all (instead of no medal for fourth place). This is more pronounced in knockout competitions, where the bronze medals are achieved by winning a third place playoff, whereas silver medals are awarded after a defeat in the final. This psychological phenomenon was parodied in the Jerry Seinfeld special I'm Telling You for the Last Time.

== See also ==
- Bronze and brass ornamental work
- Third place playoff
