= Flagellation of Christ (Piero della Francesca) =

Painting by Piero della Francesca

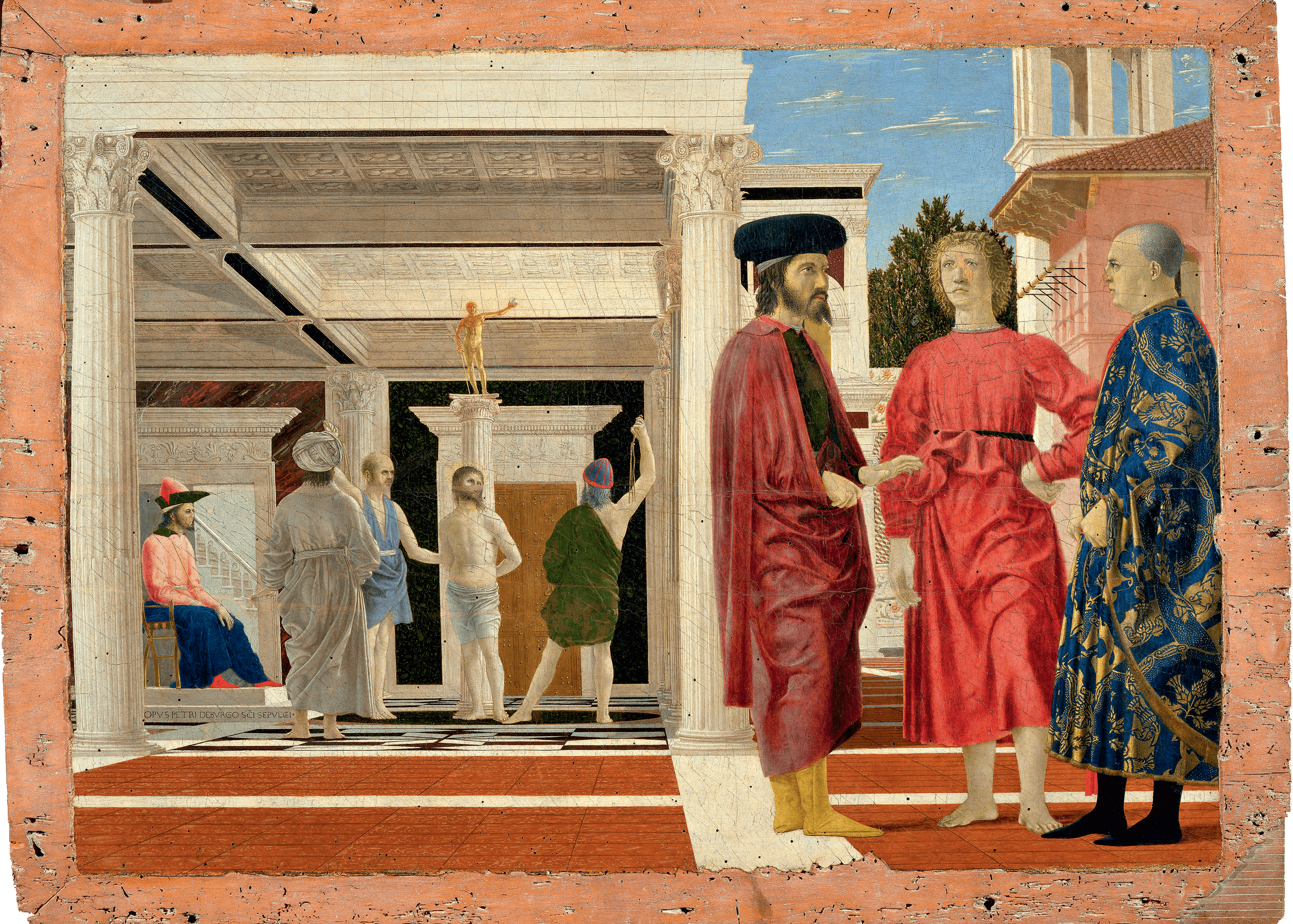
- Artist: Piero della Francesca
- Year: 1459–1460
- Type: tempera on panel
- Dimensions: 67.5 cm × 91 cm (26.6 in × 36 in)
- Location: Galleria Nazionale delle Marche, Urbino

The Flagellation of Christ (1459–1460) is a painting by Piero della Francesca in the Galleria Nazionale delle Marche in Urbino, Italy. Called by one writer an "enigmatic little painting," the composition is complex and unusual, and its iconography has been the subject of widely differing theories. Kenneth Clark called The Flagellation "the greatest small painting in the world".

== Description ==
The theme of the picture is the Flagellation of Christ by the Romans during his Passion. The biblical event takes place in an open gallery in the middle distance, while three figures in the foreground on the right-hand side apparently pay no attention to the event unfolding behind them. The panel is much admired for its use of linear perspective and the air of stillness that pervades the work, and it has been given the epithet "the Greatest Small Painting in the World" by the art historian Kenneth Clark.

The painting is signed under the seated emperor OPVS PETRI DE BVRGO S[AN]C[T]I SEPVLCRI – "the work of Piero of Borgo Santo Sepolcro" (his town).

The Flagellation is particularly admired for the realistic rendering of the hall in which the flagellation scene is situated in relation to the size of the figures and for the geometrical order of the composition. The portrait of the bearded man at the front is considered unusually intense for Piero's time.

== Interpretations ==
Much of the scholarly debate surrounding the work concerns the identities or significance of the three men at the front. According to Adriano Marinazzo, they might portray the past, the present, and the future, or the three ages of man. Other scholars, depending on the interpretation of the subject of the painting, say that they may represent contemporary figures or people related to the passion of Christ, or they may even have multiple identities. The latter is also suggested with respect to the sitting man on the left, who is in one sense certainly Pontius Pilate, a traditional element in the subject. The notion of two time frames in the composition is derived from the fact that the flagellation scene is illuminated from the right while the supposedly "modern" outdoor scene is illuminated from the left. Originally the painting had a frame on which the Latin phrase "Convenerunt in Unum" ("They came together"), taken from Psalm 2, ii in the Old Testament, was inscribed. This text is cited in Book of Acts 4:26 and related to Pilate, Herod and the Jews.

=== Conventional ===
According to a conventional interpretation still upheld in Urbino, the three men would be Oddantonio da Montefeltro, Duke of Urbino between his advisors, Manfredo dei Pio and Tommaso di Guido dell'Agnello, who were murdered together on July 22, 1444. Both advisers were held responsible for Oddantonio's death due to their unpopular government, which led to the fatal conspiracy. Oddantonio's death would be compared, in its innocence, to that of Christ. The painting would then have been commissioned by Federico da Montefeltro, who succeeded his half brother Oddantonio as Lord of Urbino. According to another interpretation, the two men to the left and right of the youth would represent Serafini and Ricciarelli, both citizens of Urbino, who allegedly murdered Oddantonio together with his two bad advisors. Against these interpretations speaks the written contract signed by Federico and the citizens of Urbino, "that he would not bear in remembrance the offenses inflicted on Oddantonio, that no one would be punished for it and that Federico would protect all who may be compromised in these crimes". Moreover, Oddantonio's corpse was buried in an unnamed grave. A painting dedicated to the memory of Duke Oddantonio and to his rehabilitation would thus have been a case of betrayal to the citizens of Urbino.

=== Dynastic ===
Another traditional view considers the picture a dynastic celebration commissioned by Duke Federico da Montefeltro, Oddantonio's successor and half-brother. The three men would simply be his predecessors. This interpretation is backed by an 18th-century inventory in the Urbino Cathedral, where the painting once was housed, and in which the work is described as "The Flagellation of Our Lord Jesus Christ, with the Figures and the Portraits of Duke Guidubaldo and Oddo Antonio". However, since Duke Guidobaldo was a son of Federico born in 1472, this information has to be erroneous. Instead, the rightmost figure may represent Oddantonio's and Federico's father Guidantonio.

=== Political-theological (Ginzburg) ===
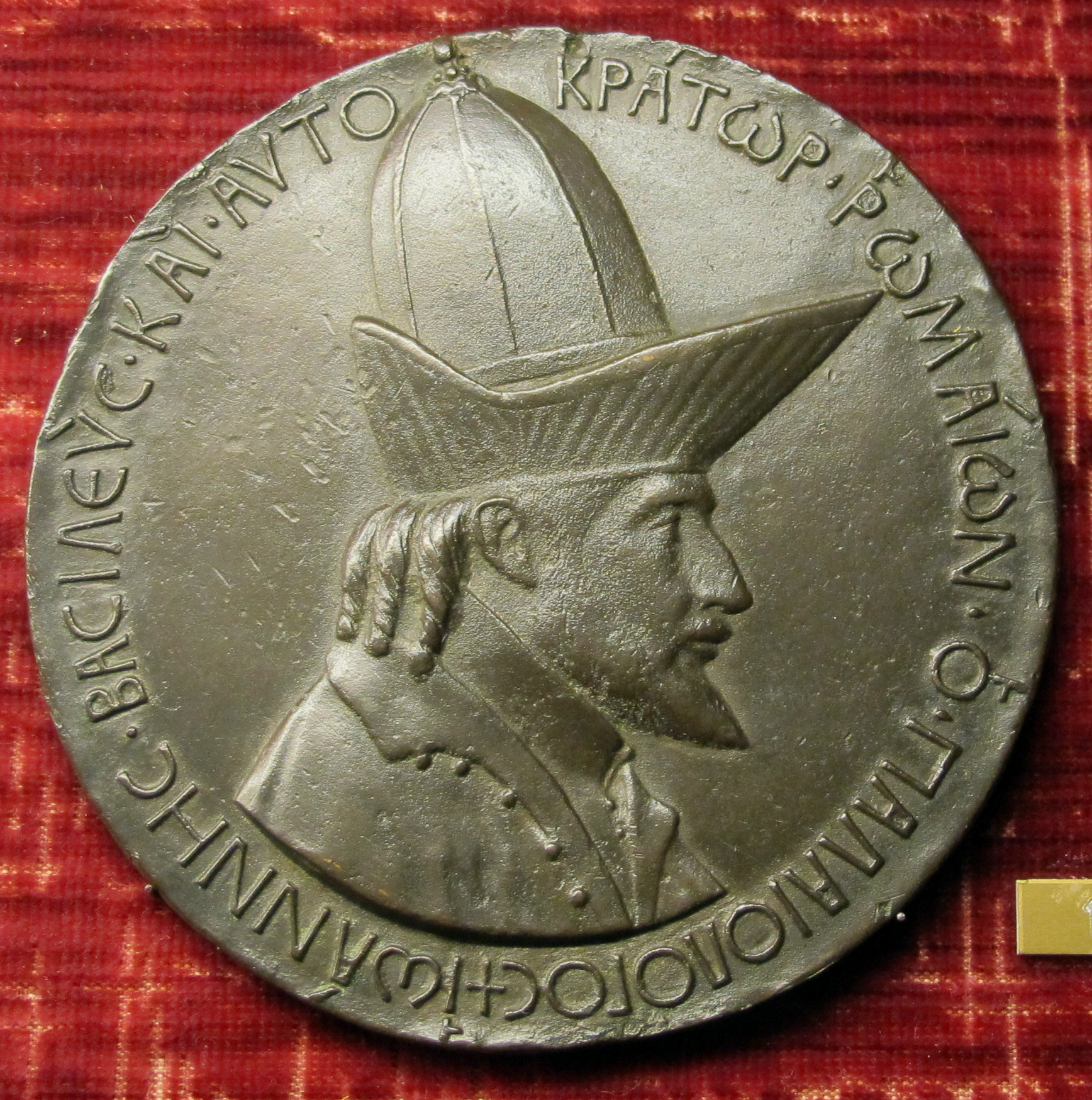
Medal of the Emperor John VIII Palaiologos during his visit to Florence, by Pisanello (1438). The seated man on left of the painting wears a very similar hat.

According to this other old-fashioned view, the figure in the middle would represent an angel, flanked by the Latin (Catholic) and the Greek (Orthodox) Churches, whose division created strife in the whole of Christendom.

The seated man on the far left watching the flagellation would be the Byzantine emperor John VIII Palaiologos, as identified by his clothing, particularly the unusual red hat with upturned brims which is present in a medal by Pisanello. In the variant of this interpretation, proposed by Carlo Ginzburg, the painting would be in fact an invitation by Cardinal Bessarion to Federico da Montefeltro to take part in the crusade. The young man would be Bonconte II da Montefeltro, who died of plague in 1458. In this way, the sufferings of Christ are paired both to those of the Byzantines and of Bonconte.

Silvia Ronchey and other art historians agree on the panel being a political message by Cardinal Bessarion, in which the flagellated Christ would represent the suffering of Constantinople, then besieged by the Ottomans, as well as the whole of Christianity. The figure on the left watching would be sultan Murad II, with John VIII on his left. The three men on the right are identified as, from left: Cardinal Bessarion, Thomas Palaiologos (John VIII's brother, portrayed barefoot as, being not an emperor, he could not wear the purple shoes with which John is instead shown) and Niccolò III d'Este, host of the council of Mantua after its move to his lordship of Ferrara.

Piero della Francesca painted the Flagellation some 20 years after the fall of Constantinople. But, at the time, allegories of that event and of the presence of Byzantine figures in Italian politics were not uncommon, as shown by Benozzo Gozzoli's contemporary Magi Chapel in the Palazzo Medici-Riccardi in Florence.

=== Kenneth Clark ===
In his 1951 book, Piero Della Francesca, art historian Kenneth Clark identified the bearded figure as a Greek scholar and the painting as an allegory of the suffering of the Church after the fall of the Byzantine Empire in 1453. The painting also commemorates one of the Councils held after, possibly the Council of Mantua (1459). Clark stated that to date all attempts to explain the center figure or portrait on the right had been unsuccessful. Again, the man in the far left would be the Byzantine Emperor.

=== Marilyn Aronberg Lavin ===
Another explanation of the painting is offered by Marilyn Aronberg Lavin in Piero della Francesca: The Flagellation.

The interior scene represents Pontius Pilate showing Herod with his back turned, because the scene closely resembles numerous other depictions of the flagellation that Piero would have known.

Lavin identifies the figure on the right as Ludovico III Gonzaga, Marquis of Mantua, and the figure on the left as his close friend, the astrologer Ottaviano Ubaldini della Carda, who lived in the Ducal Palace. Ottavio is dressed in the traditional garb of an astrologer, even down to his forked beard. At the time the painting is thought to have been made, both Ottavio and Ludovico had recently lost beloved sons, represented by the youthful figure between them. The youth's head is framed by a laurel tree, representing glory. Lavin suggests that the painting is intended to compare the suffering of Christ with the grief of the two fathers. She suggests that the painting was commissioned by Ottavio for his private chapel, the Cappella del Perdono, which is in the Ducal Palace at Urbino and which has an altar whose facade is the exact size of the painting. If the painting was on the altar, the perspective in the painting would have appeared correct only to someone kneeling before it.

=== David A. King ===
An interpretation developed by David King, director (1985–2007) of the Institute for the History of Science in Frankfurt, Germany, establishes a connection between the painting and the Latin inscription on an astrolabe presented in Rome in 1462 by Regiomontanus to his patron Cardinal Bessarion. The discovery that this epigram was an acrostic was made by Berthold Holzschuh, a member of King's medieval instrument seminar, in 2005. The hidden meanings in the vertical axes include references to Bessarion, Regiomontanus, and the 1462 gift that was intended to replace a 1062 Byzantine astrolabe in Bessarion's possession (now in Brescia). In the same year Holzschuh discovered that the main axes of the epigram corresponded to the main vertical axes of the painting, which pass through the eyes of the Christ figure and those of the bearded man. It was clear that the letters BA IOANNIS on the left of the epigram and the letters SEDES on the right might refer to Basileus (Emperor) Ioannis VIII on his throne. This inspired King to search for monograms of names across the epigram (for example, INRI for Christ and RGO for Regiomontanus), and he found some 70 possibly relevant names corresponding to the 8+1 figures. King thus established dual or multiple identities for each of the eight persons and one classical figure who would eventually feature in the painting. Both Regiomontanus and Bessarion were known to Piero (their common interest was Archimedes), and both Regiomontanus' and Piero's copies of Archimedes' works have been preserved. King hypothesises that donor and donee of the 1462 astrolabe might have conceived the make-up of the painting together with Piero. The young man in cardinal red can now be identified as the eager young German astronomer Regiomontanus, the new protégé of the Cardinal Bessarion. However, his image embodies, amongst others, three brilliant young men close to Bessarion who had recently died: Buonconte da Montefeltro, Bernardino Ubaldini dalla Carda and Vangelista Gonzaga. Each of the images of persons in the painting, as well as of the classical figure atop the column behind Christ, is polysemous. The painting itself is polysemous. One of the several purposes of the painting was to signify hope for the future in the arrival of the young astronomer into Bessarion's circle as well as to pay homage to the three dead young men. Another was to express Bessarion's sorrow that his native Trebizond had fallen to the Turks in 1461, for which he held the Byzantine ruler responsible.

=== John Pope-Hennessy ===
Sir John Pope-Hennessy, the art historian, argued in his book The Piero della Francesca Trail that the actual subject of the painting is "The Dream of St. Jerome." According to Pope-Hennessy,

As a young man St Jerome dreamt that he was flayed on divine order for reading pagan texts, and he himself later recounted this dream, in a celebrated letter to Eustochium, in terms that exactly correspond with the left-hand side of the Urbino panel.

Pope-Hennessy also cites and reproduces an earlier picture by Sienese painter Matteo di Giovanni that deals with the subject recorded in Jerome's letter, supporting his identification of Piero's theme.

== Influence ==
The painting's restraint and formal purity strongly appealed when Piero was first "discovered," especially to admirers of cubist and abstract art. It has been held in especially high regard by art historians, with Frederick Hartt describing it as Piero's "most nearly perfect achievement and the ultimate realisation of the ideals of the second Renaissance period".

The painting is referred to in Len Deighton's 1978 novel, SS-GB.
