= Portrait of Sigismund of Luxemburg =

Painting attributed to Pisanello

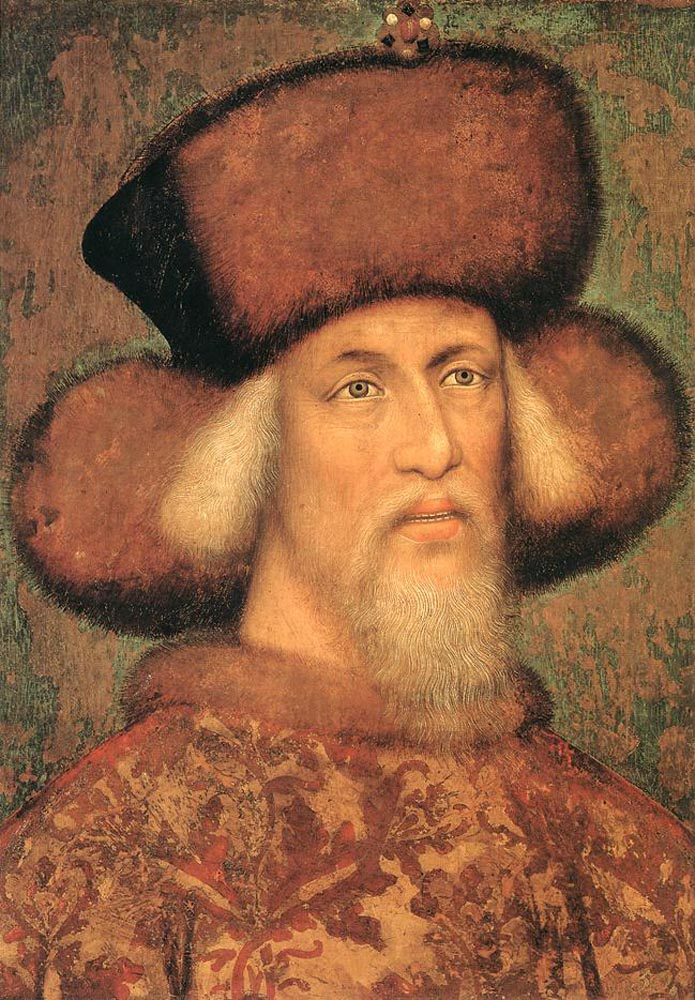
- Artist: Pisanello
- Year: 1432–1433
- Medium: Tempera on panel
- Dimensions: 58.5 cm × 42 cm (23.0 in × 17 in)
- Location: Kunsthistorisches Museum, Vienna

The Portrait of Sigismund of Luxembourg (Italian: Ritratto di Sigismondo di Lussemburgo) is a tempera on panel painting attributed to the Italian Late-Gothic master Pisanello and probably executed between 1432 and 1433. It is on display at the Kunsthistorisches Museum in Vienna, Austria.

== Description ==
The portrait was possibly executed when King Sigismund travelled to Mantua to vest Gianfrancesco Gonzaga with the title of marquess. In October 1431 the King had travelled to Italy to sojourn at the court of Filippo Maria Visconti in Milan, where he received the Iron Crown of Lombardy. He later also stayed in Lucca and Siena, and would proceed to Rome to be crowned Holy Roman Emperor by Pope Eugene IV on 31 May 1433.

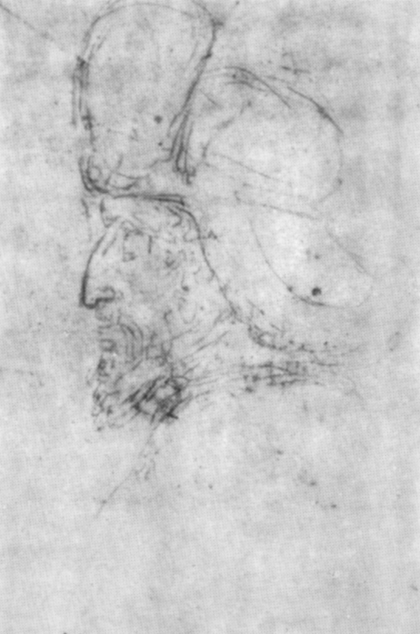
Pisanello drawing, Louvre Département des Arts Graphiques, INV 2479

The portrait obtained an official status, and was copied several times. In 1451 Piero della Francesca was inspired by it for the features of Sigismund of Burgundy of his fresco Sigismondo Pandolfo Malatesta Praying in Front of St. Sigismund at the Tempio Malatestiano, where he painted the same hat though without the fur filling. The portrait was part of the imperial collection and housed in the residence of Archduke Ferdinand II of Austria at Ambras Castle near Innsbruck, before being acquired by the Kunsthistorisches Museum.

The attribution to Pisanello is disputed, although supported by a Pisanello drawing of the emperor wearing the same hat, on display at the Louvre in Paris. It was previously attributed to the Salzburg painter Conrad Laib or to a Bohemian artist.
