= The Vision of Saint Eustace =

Painting by Pisanello

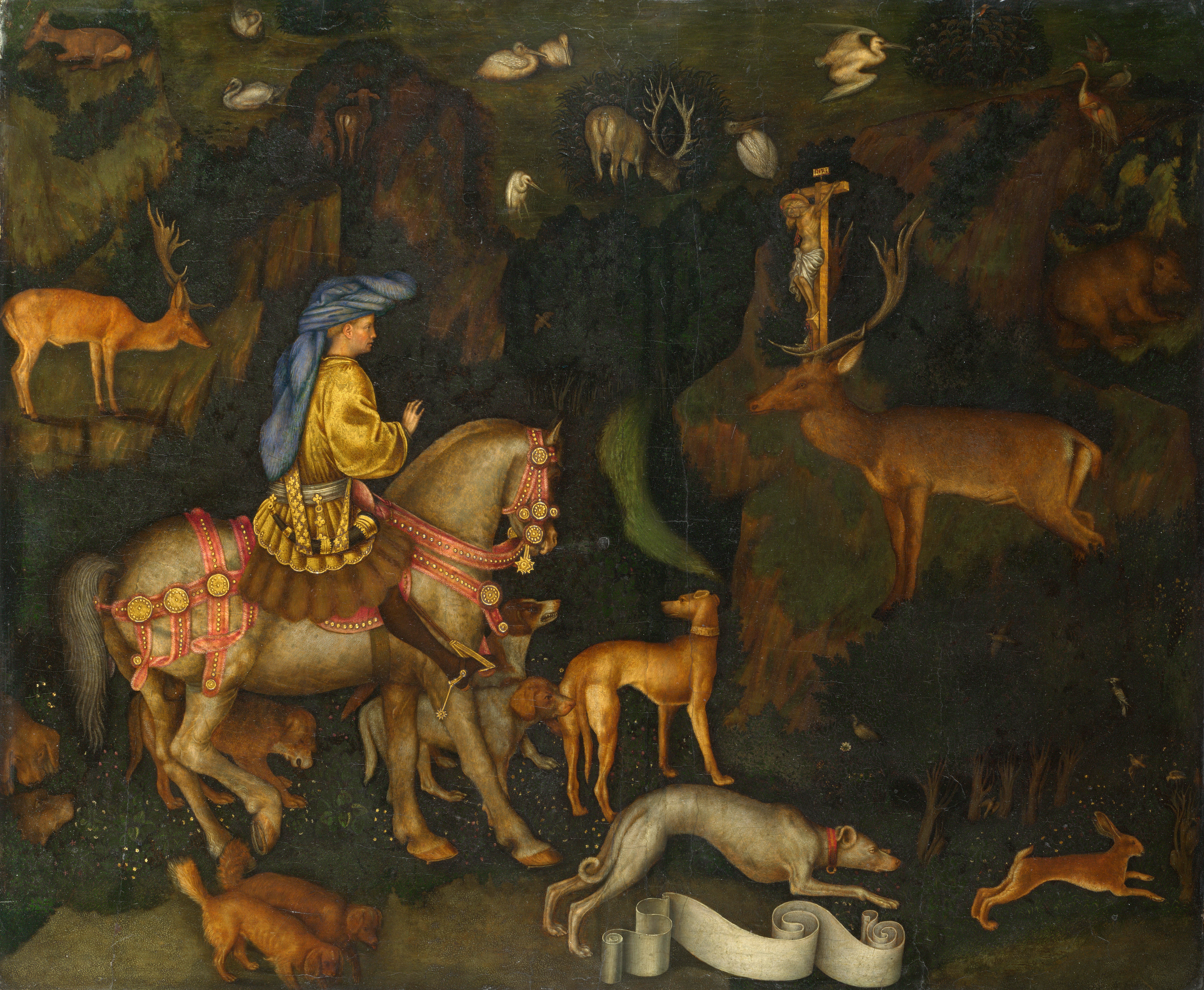
- Artist: Pisanello
- Year: c. 1438–1442
- Type: Egg tempera on wood
- Dimensions: 54.5 cm × 65.5 cm (21.5 in × 25.8 in)
- Location: National Gallery; London

The Vision of Saint Eustace is a painting by the early Italian Renaissance master Pisanello, now in the National Gallery in London. The date of the work is unknown and has been assigned by various scholars to different points in Pisanello's career, but the National Gallery's website currently dates it to "about 1438-1442". The work depicts Saint Eustace before a stag, between the antlers of which is a crucifix, as described in the Golden Legend. Although a similar story is told of Saint Hubert, the identification of the figure as Saint Eustace is based on the fact that Pisanello painted Saint Eustace in Sant'Anastasia. Saint Hubert's depiction in Italian art during this period is also unlikely.

Saint Eustace is portrayed as a huntsman dressed in the height of court fashion, wearing a golden tunic and blue headdress. The patron was therefore given the opportunity to appreciate the work as a devotional piece in addition to identifying with the aristocratic pastime of hunting and chivalric ideology. The patron for whom the work was painted is, however, unknown. Suggested patrons include the Gonzaga and Filippo Maria Visconti. Leonello or Borso d’Este, keen huntsmen, have also been proposed. It is possible that the saint could be a profile portrait of the patron.

The hunting scene allowed Pisanello to demonstrate his considerable skill in depicting animals and birds in a naturalistic but decorative way. Drawings of them from pattern books were undoubtedly used. The animals are portrayed at various scales and scattered around a ‘tipped-up’ landscape not dissimilar to those visible in Netherlandish tapestries. The landscape's construction also demonstrates a familiarity with illuminations in manuscript hunting treatises, such as the canonical Livre de Chasse by Gaston Phoebus.

The purpose of the blank scroll in the foreground of the painting is unknown. There is no evidence to suggest it ever contained any lettering. Its original intention may have been to carry the words of Christ to Saint Eustace or to bear a motto provided by the patron. It has been suggested, however, that the empty scroll is designed to demonstrate the superfluity of words in relation to images and thus refers to a contemporary humanist debate regarding the relative merits of poetry and art.

During the course of its history, The Vision of Saint Eustace has been extensively repainted and retouched. Originally, the panel was taller (it has been cut at the top). The landscape has darkened because of the black underpaint and the use of malachite. The gold leaf in the tunic and harness has been regilded. Some animals, like the bear, have been entirely repainted. The saint's hat and face, however, are well preserved and the pastiglia (low gesso relief for decoration of some details), present in the harness, hunting horn and spurs, is original.

The painting was bought by the National Gallery in 1895, catalogued as NG 1436, and is today on display in room 55.
