= Pisanello =

15th-century Italian artist

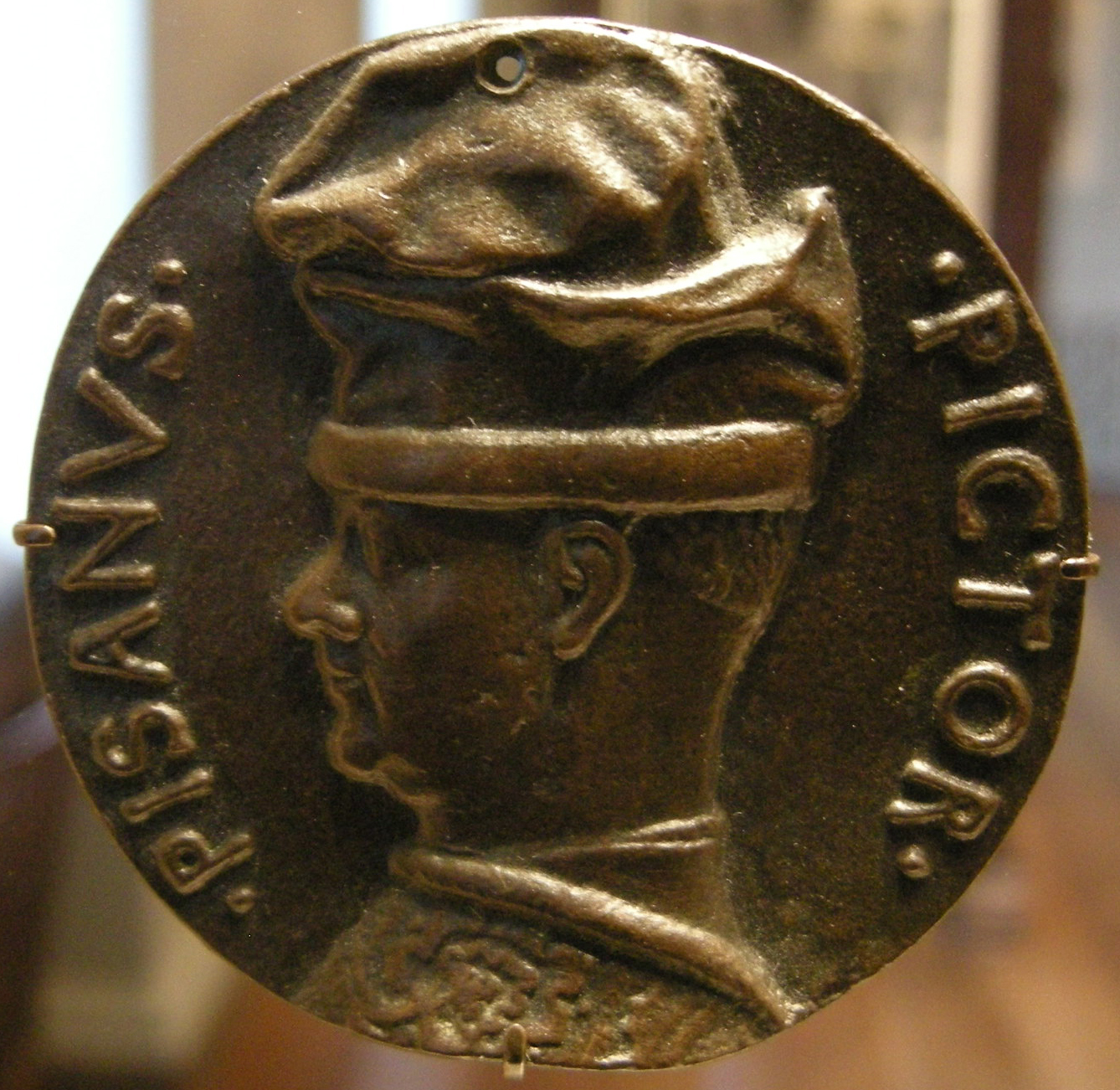
- A medal showing the profile of Pisanello (1443), attributed to Antonio Marescotti
- Born: Antonio di Puccio Pisano c. 1380/1395; Pisa, Republic of Pisa
- Died: c. 1450/1455 (aged 55‒75); Naples, Kingdom of Naples
- Education: Gentile da Fabriano
- Known for: Painting, frescos, medal
- Notable work: St. George and the Princess
- Movement: International Gothic, Italian Renaissance

Signature
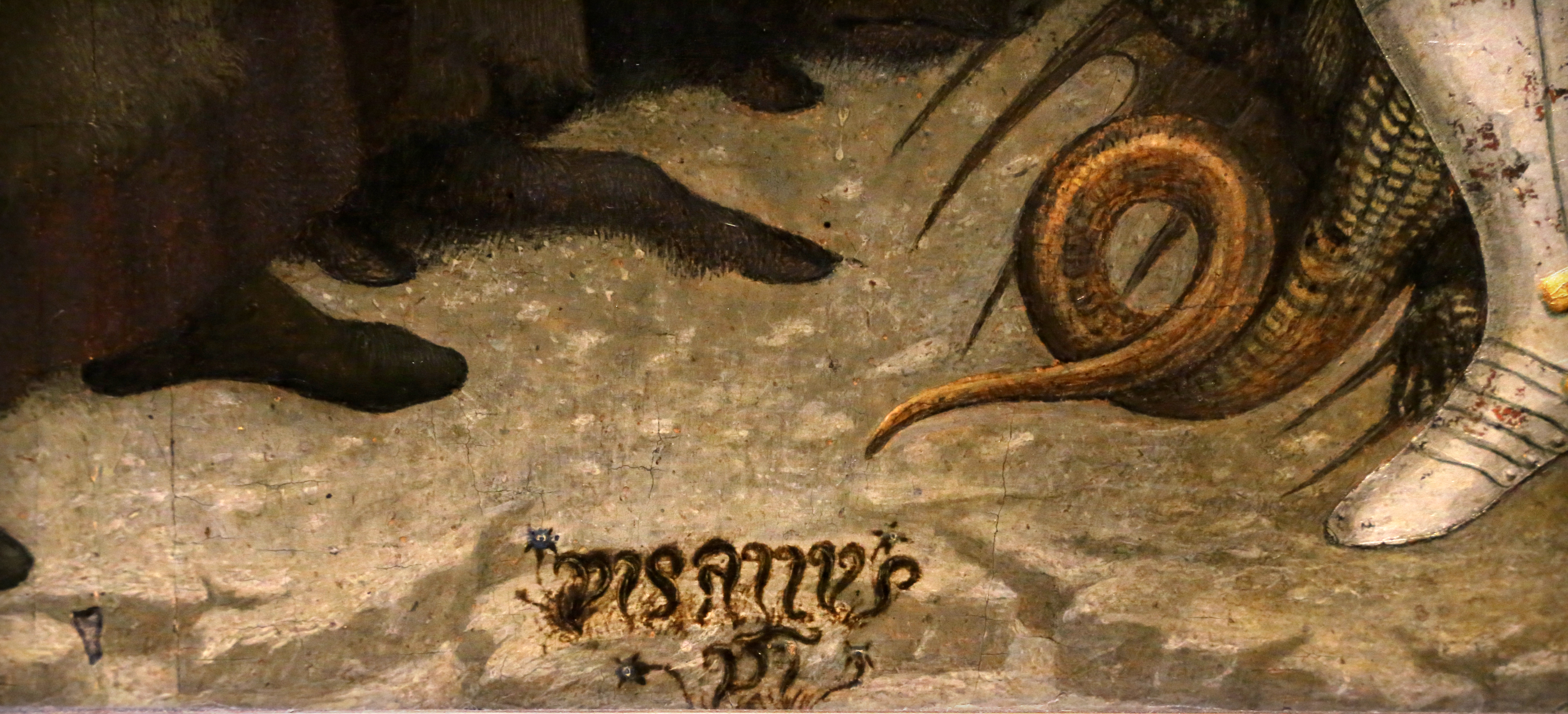

Pisanello (c. 1380/1395 – c. 1450/1455), born Antonio di Puccio Pisano or Antonio di Puccio da Cereto, also erroneously called Vittore Pisano by Giorgio Vasari, was one of the most distinguished painters of the early Italian Renaissance and Quattrocento. He was acclaimed by poets such as Guarino da Verona and praised by humanists of his time, who compared him to such illustrious names as Cimabue, Phidias and Praxiteles.

Pisanello is known for his resplendent frescoes in murals, portraits, easel pictures, and a number of drawings such as those in the Codex Vallardi (Louvre). He is the most important commemorative portrait medallist in the first half of the 15th century, and he can claim to have originated this important genre.

He was employed by the Doge of Venice, the Pope in the Vatican and the courts of Verona, Ferrara, Mantua, Milan, Rimini, and by the King of Naples. He stood in high esteem in the Gonzaga and Este families.

Pisanello had a number of his works wrongly ascribed to other artists such as Piero della Francesca, Albrecht Dürer and Leonardo da Vinci, to name a few. While most of his paintings have perished, a number of his drawings and medals have survived.

== Early life ==
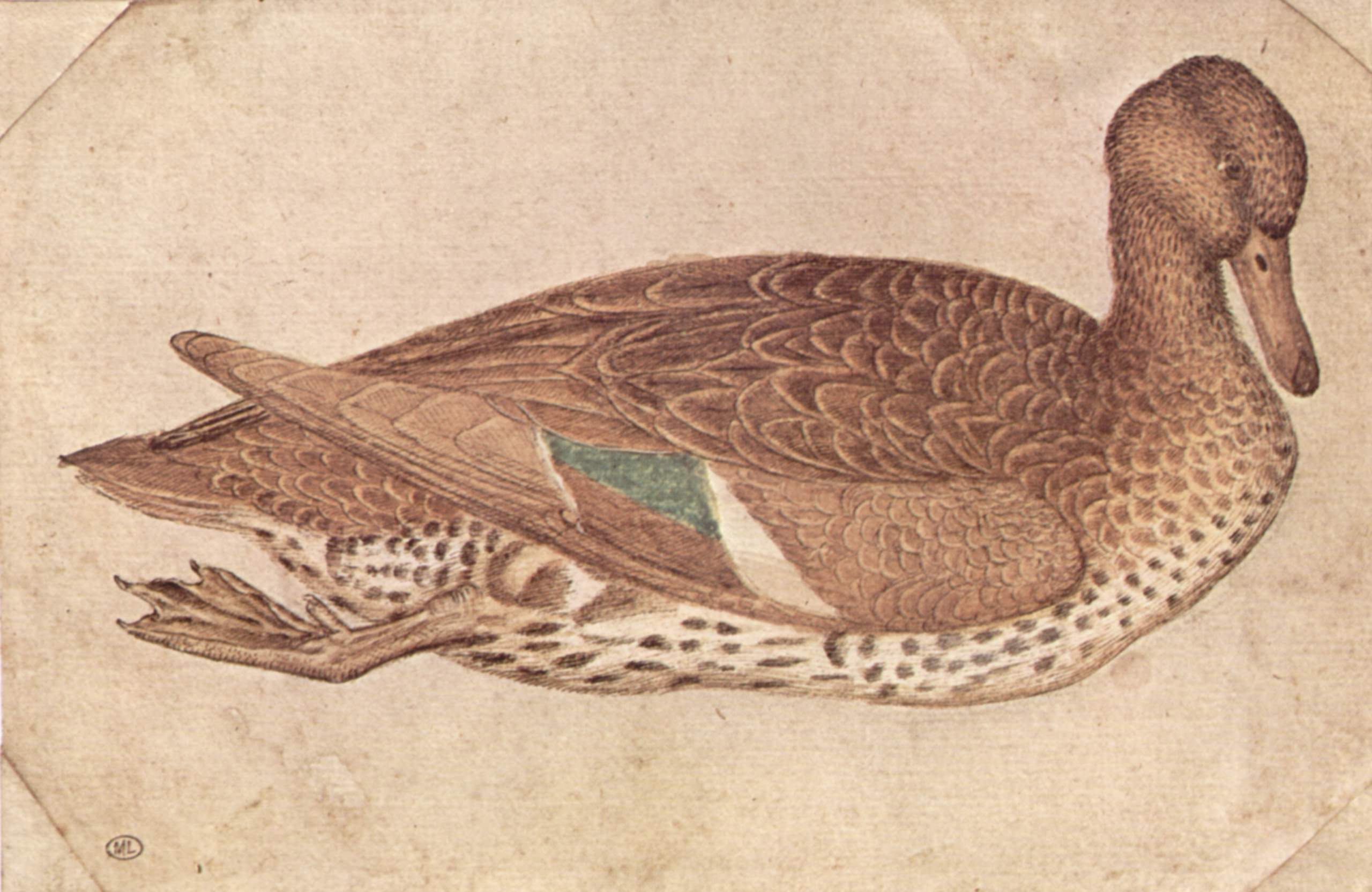
Duck in watercolor

Pisanello's life is somewhat shrouded in mystery. He was born between 1380 and 1395 and died between 1450 and 1455 (probably between 14 July and 8 October 1455). He was a native of Pisa but spent his early years in San Vigilio sul Lago in the territory of Verona. He was probably given his early training by a Veronese painter (perhaps Altichiero or Stefano da Verona) as his early style is in the tradition of Veronese painting.

== Training ==
Between 1415 and 1420, Pisanello was the assistant of the renowned painter and illuminator Gentile da Fabriano from whom he acquired his refined, delicate, detailed style. Pisanello also acquired from him a taste for precious materials and beautiful fabrics that can be found in his later paintings. The frescoes in the Doge's Palace at Venice, on which they worked together, have perished as well as the frescoes in the Basilica of St. John Lateran and the palaces of Mantua and Pavia.

In 1422, Pisanello was reported to be in Mantua in the service of young Ludovico Gonzaga, son of the Marchese of Mantua Gianfrancesco Gonzaga. He continued to work for the Gonzaga family till the 1440s.

Giorgio Vasari, an artist and biographer of the Italian Renaissance, states that Pisanello also worked in the workshop of Andrea del Castagno, author of the painted equestrian monument of Niccolò da Tolentino (1456) in the Cathedral in Florence. He must also have known Paolo Uccello, the painter of the Battle of San Romano with its multiple horses. Pisanello's love of drawing horses probably finds its origin in this relationship; but as there is so much unknown of his life, this attribution by Vasari is not reliable and may only be a legend.

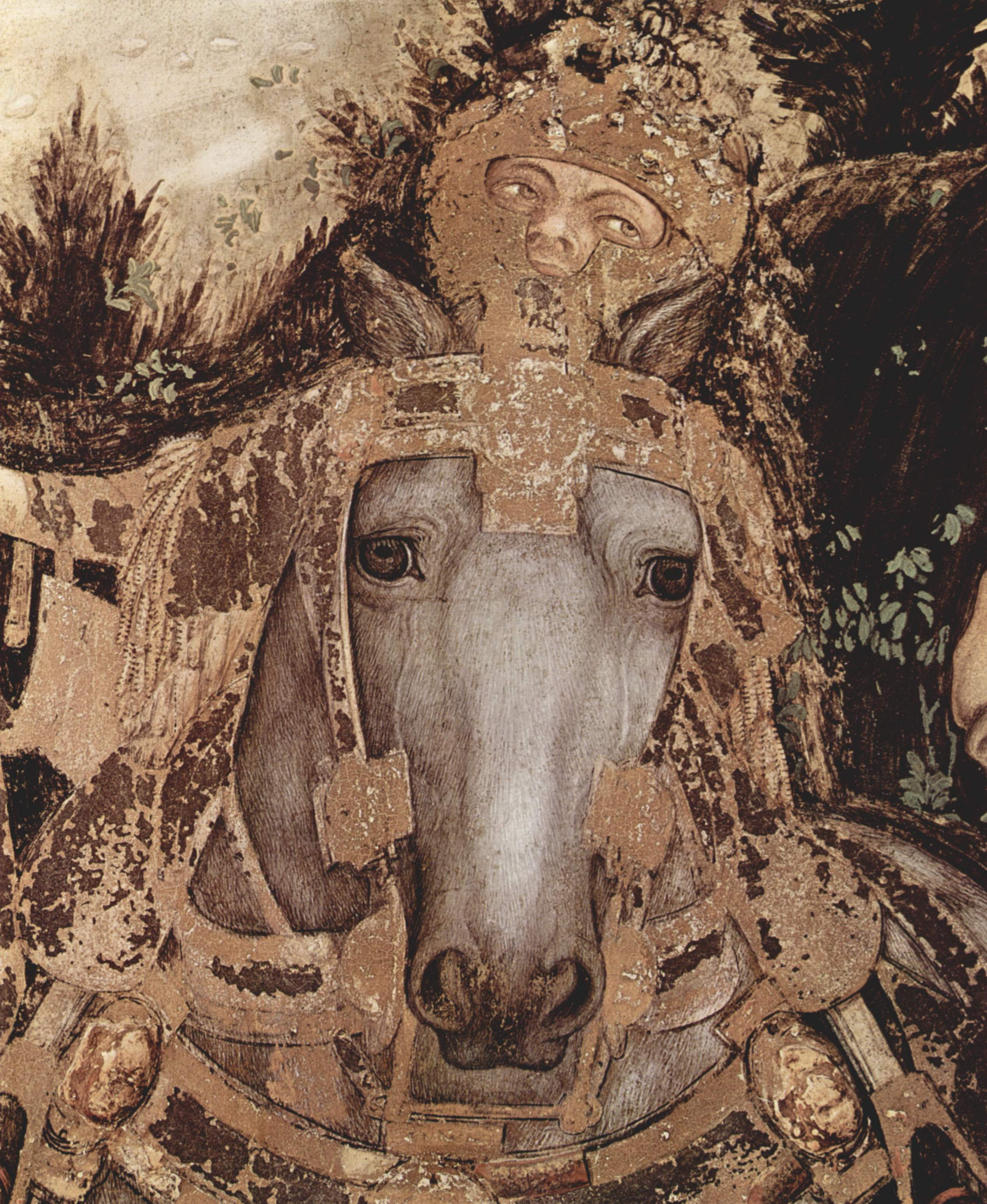
St. George and the Princess (detail with horse).

Pisanello's Madonna of the Quail, now in the Museo di Castelvecchio in Verona, is signed by "Antonius Pisanus". It is tentatively dated at c. 1420. The style is a blend of the styles of Gentile da Fabriano and Stefano da Verona. This might show that Pisanello was also a pupil of the latter in Verona.

Pisanello stayed again in Verona in 1424. However, according to some scholars, he painted frescoes about hunting and fishing and jousts in Pavia the same year. These were commissioned by the Duke of Milan Filippo Maria Visconti. There is no trace of these frescoes left.

Back in Mantua with the Gonzagas between 1424 and 1426, Pisanello painted one of his important surviving works: the fresco Annunciation in San Fermo, Verona. It was used to embellish the funeral monument of Nicolò di Brenzoni by the Florentine sculptor Nanni di Bartolo.

When Gentile da Fabriano died in Rome between August and October 1427, his work at the Basilica of St. John Lateran was unfinished. Pisanello completed the frescoes of his former master between 1431 and 1432. All these frescoes were destroyed when the basilica was rebuilt in the 17th century by Francesco Borromini. The Kupferstichkabinet in Berlin has a pale sketch of this fresco, drawn by Borromini. While in Rome, he became more and more influenced by the classical style of Renaissance art.

== Style ==
Pisanello's drawings are generally prized as jewels of the quattrocento, and provide evidence of the elegant garb of the time, including spectacular hats. In contrast with his contemporaries, his drawings are not drafts for future paintings but are autonomous works of art. He compiled several books of drawings, detailed and accurate studies of fauna and flora drawn with poetic naturalism, and elegant costumes.

== Nobility ==
Pisanello travelled to several Italian cities and was introduced to a number of courts. He stayed for a while in Florence. In this period he painted two important portraits: Emperor Sigismund, now in the Kunsthistorisches Museum, Vienna (but the attribution is still contested) and Portrait of a Man (now in the Palazzo Rosso, Genoa).

Pisanello returned to Verona between 1433 and 1438. His fresco masterpiece from this period is Saint George and the Princess of Trebizond (c. 1433–1438) at the Pellegrini Chapel, church of Sant'Anastasia, Verona. It had to be restored after water seepage damaged the fresco at the end of the 19th century. He prepared for this painting with a number of drawings, some of which are on display in the Louvre Museum, Paris.

== Portraits and medal making ==
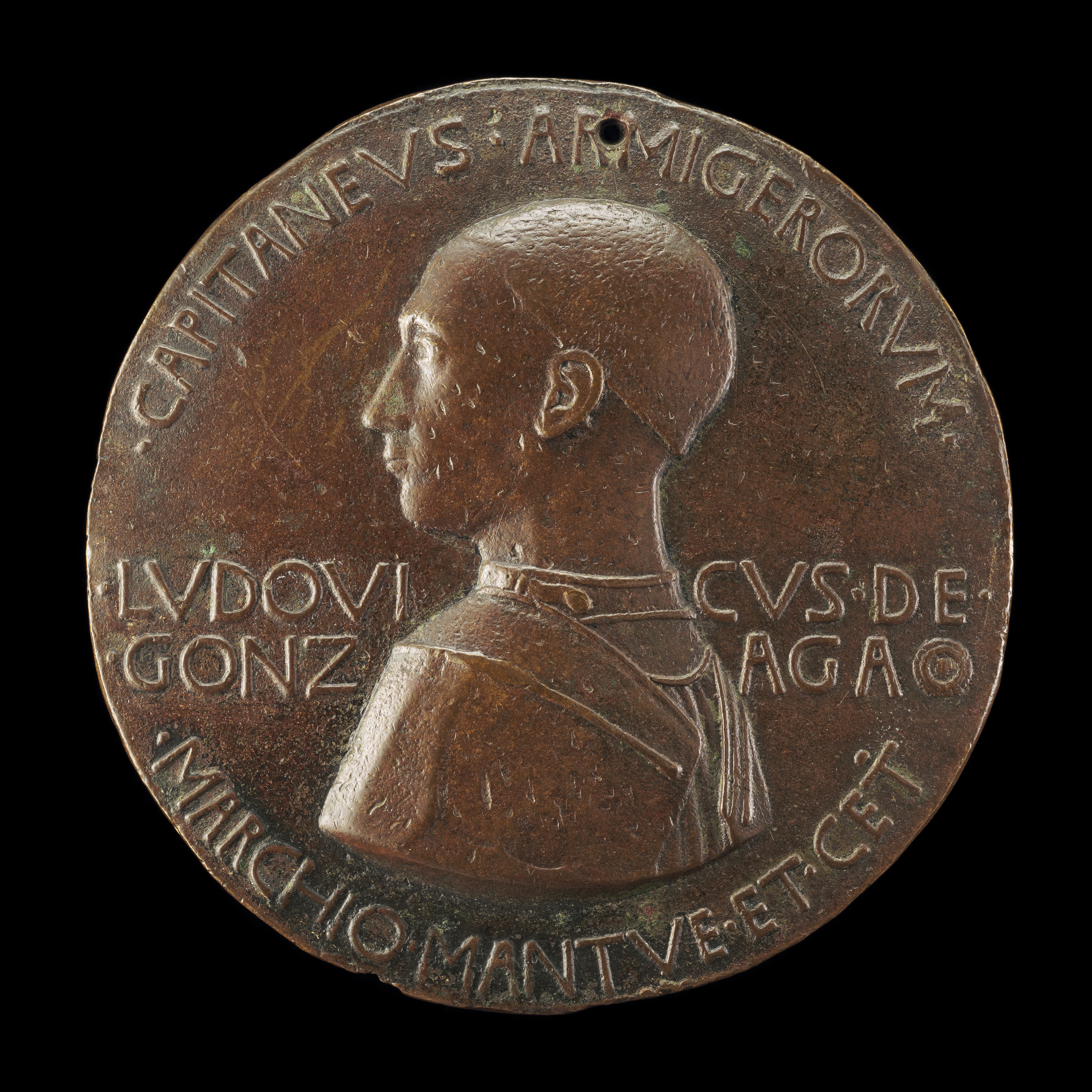
Portrait of Ludovico III Gonzaga, Margrave of Mantua. Medal by Antonio Pisano (obverse).

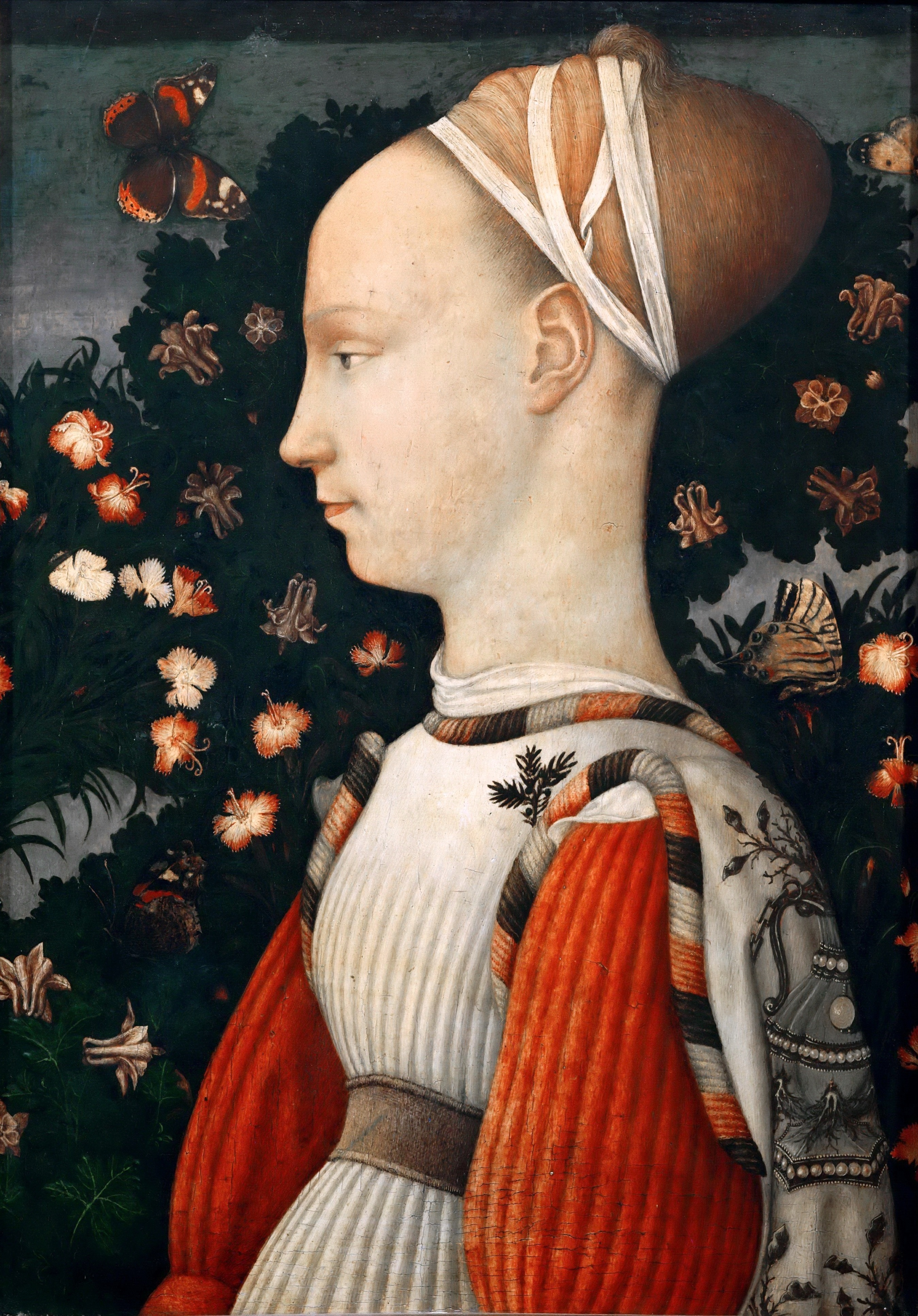
Portrait of a Princess, c. 1435–1440.

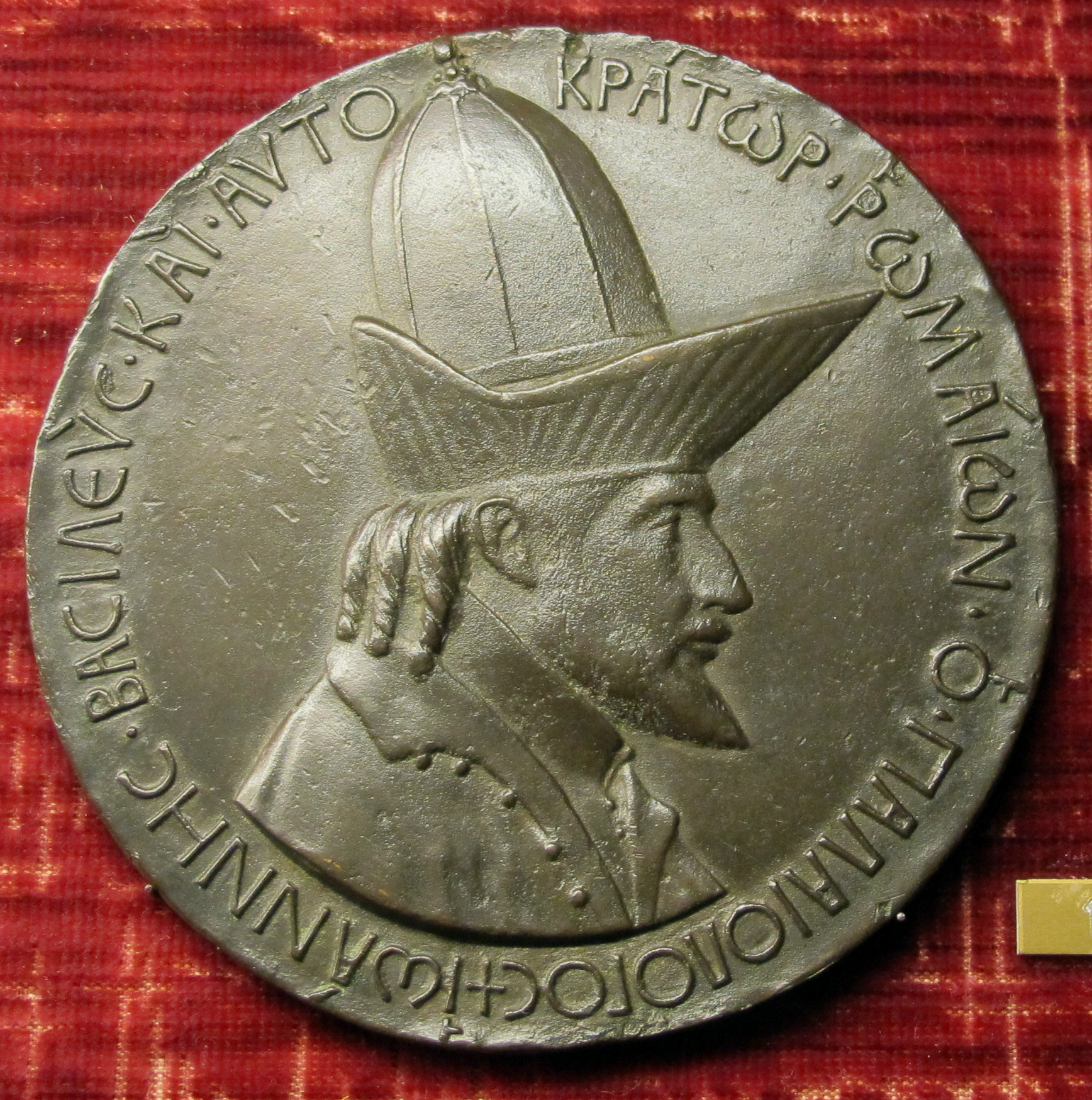
Medal of John VIII Palaeologus by Pisanello, who saw him at Ferrara in 1438.

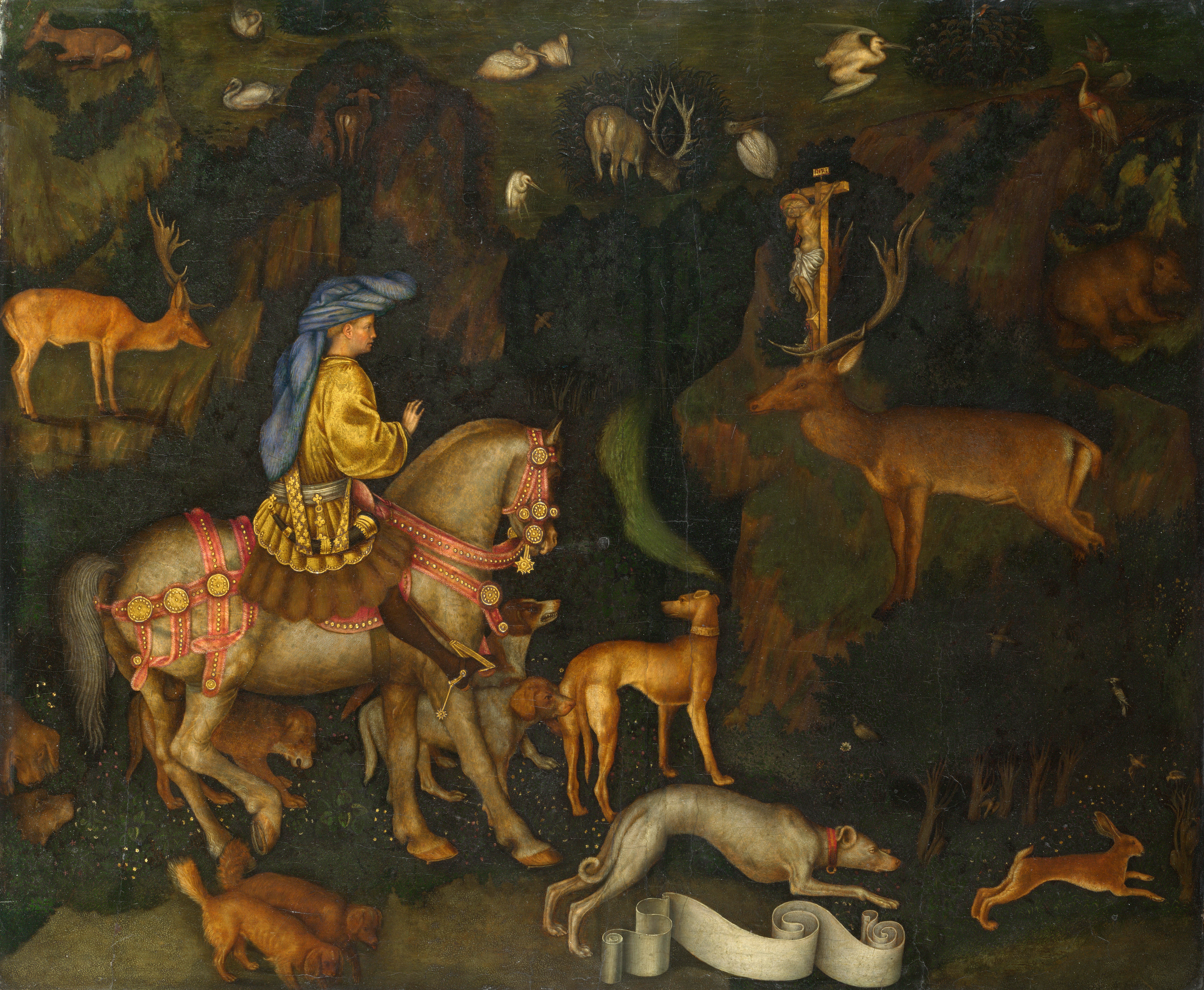
The Vision of Saint Eustace, c. 1438–1442.

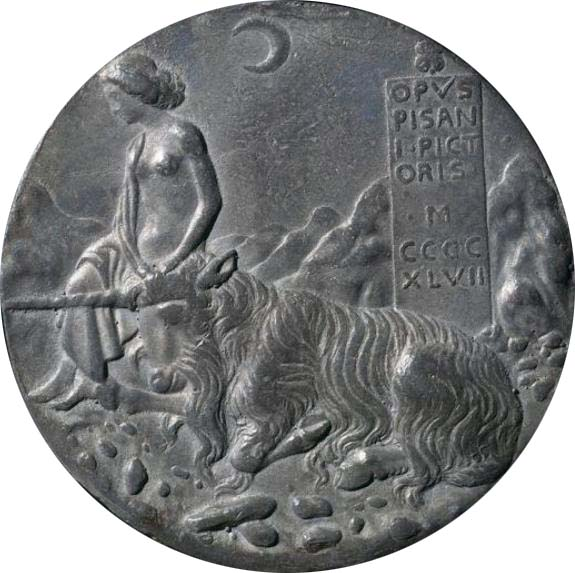
Cecilia Gonzaga medal: Innocence and Unicorn in Moonlit Landscape (1447).

From 1435, Pisanello became more and more interested in portraiture and medal making. He was introduced to Leonello d'Este, Marquess of Ferrara. His famous Portrait of an Este Princess dates from this period.

Pisanello was a prolific medalist, as evidenced by art historians such as Federico Zeri. He was the first to reinvent the genre as we still understand it today: a portrait on the front and a symbolic feat on the reverse.

The medals of the lords of the Italian courts (Gonzaga, Este, Malatesta, Crown of Aragon, etc.) were a success. The powerful people of his time were depicted in profile on the front, while on the reverse there were allegorical scenes or symbolic figures. All this was often correlated by mottos, symbols and various attributes linking to higher culture.

Pisanello's The Vision of Saint Eustace, now at the National Gallery in London, long ascribed to Albrecht Dürer because of its perfection of this fine panel, shows most animals in profile or defined poses with miniature-like delicacy. The story in this small painting (egg tempera on wood) is probably only a pretext for showing "noble" animals (horses, hunting dogs, stag, bear...) and the noblest creature of all: the hunting courtier.

In 1439, the Council of Florence negotiated with the Byzantine Emperor John VIII Palaiologos. On this occasion, Pisanello struck a commemorative medal of the emperor, the earliest portrait medal of post-classical times. He also made some drawings with portraits of the emperor and his retinue (Louvre and Chicago), suggesting he had a commission for a painting or fresco for the Este residence.

Pisanello thus became the inventor of the fields of portrait medals and related medallic art. During his lifetime Pisanello was best known for his medals. He has been copied multiple times in later generations. The medalist art declined when it deviated from the art of Pisanello. Before him, the few medals made were struck like minted coins. Pisanello, on the other hand, melted his medals the same as a bronze low-relief, clearly showing the work of a painter and a modeller. He even signed his medals with Opus Pisani pictoris (made by the painter Pisano). In his view, the portraits in his medals equal the portraits in his paintings. He even adds allegories at the reverse of his medals, such as the unicorn in the Cecilia Gonzaga medal, underlying the noble character of the princess.

== Political unrest ==
In 1438, a war broke out between the ruler of Milan Filippo Maria Visconti and the republic of Venice. Pisanello was in Mantua with Gianfrancesco Gonzaga. They decided to play a part in the capture of Verona. Consequently, the Venetian government called him a rebel and threatened him with a stiff sentence. Only an intercession by a powerful friend could preserve him.

After a stay in Milan between 1440 and 1441, Pisanello went back to Ferrara in 1441. There he painted his acclaimed portrait of Lionello d'Este, now on display at the Accademia Carrara, Bergamo. His Madonna and Child with Two Saints (National Gallery, London) probably dated from the same period. The impressive fresco cycle Scenes of War and Chivalry in the Palazzo Ducale di Mantova, Mantua probably dates from 1447.

== Later life ==
From December 1448 until the end of his life he lived in Naples, where he enjoyed great repute at the Aragon court. The poet Porcellio even wrote an ode in his honour. He may have lived five or six years longer, but there is no more mention of him in the records.

== Legacy ==
Specimens of Pisanello's work as a painter still exist in Rome, Venice, Verona, Pistoia and two in the National Gallery, London (The Vision of Saint Eustace and The Virgin and Child with Saint George and Saint Anthony Abbot). A number of his drawings can now be found at the Biblioteca Ambrosiana in Milan, Italy and the Louvre, Paris.

According to art historian Millard Meiss, Pisanello is regarded as the last and greatest master of the International Gothic style. Pisanello influenced a number of his contemporaries, but he did not create his own school. His genius shone briefly and after his death, he was quickly forgotten in the rise of the humanistic and classical culture of the Renaissance. He is now considered the last and most magnificent artist of the courtly style of the Gothic art in the 15th century, called the International Gothic style. On the other hand, he may also be considered as one of the first leaders of the Renaissance movement.

== Gallery ==
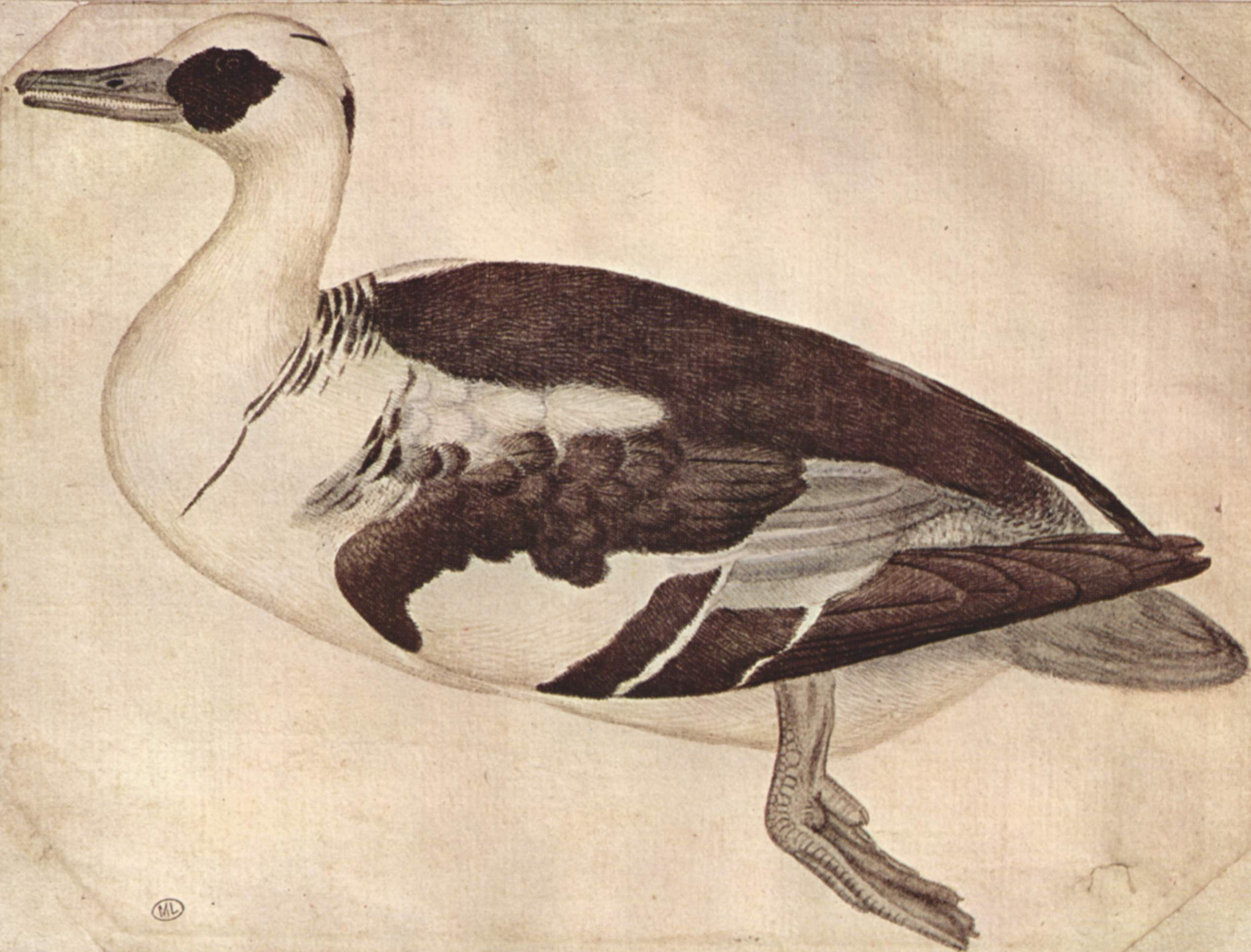
Duck (watercolor)

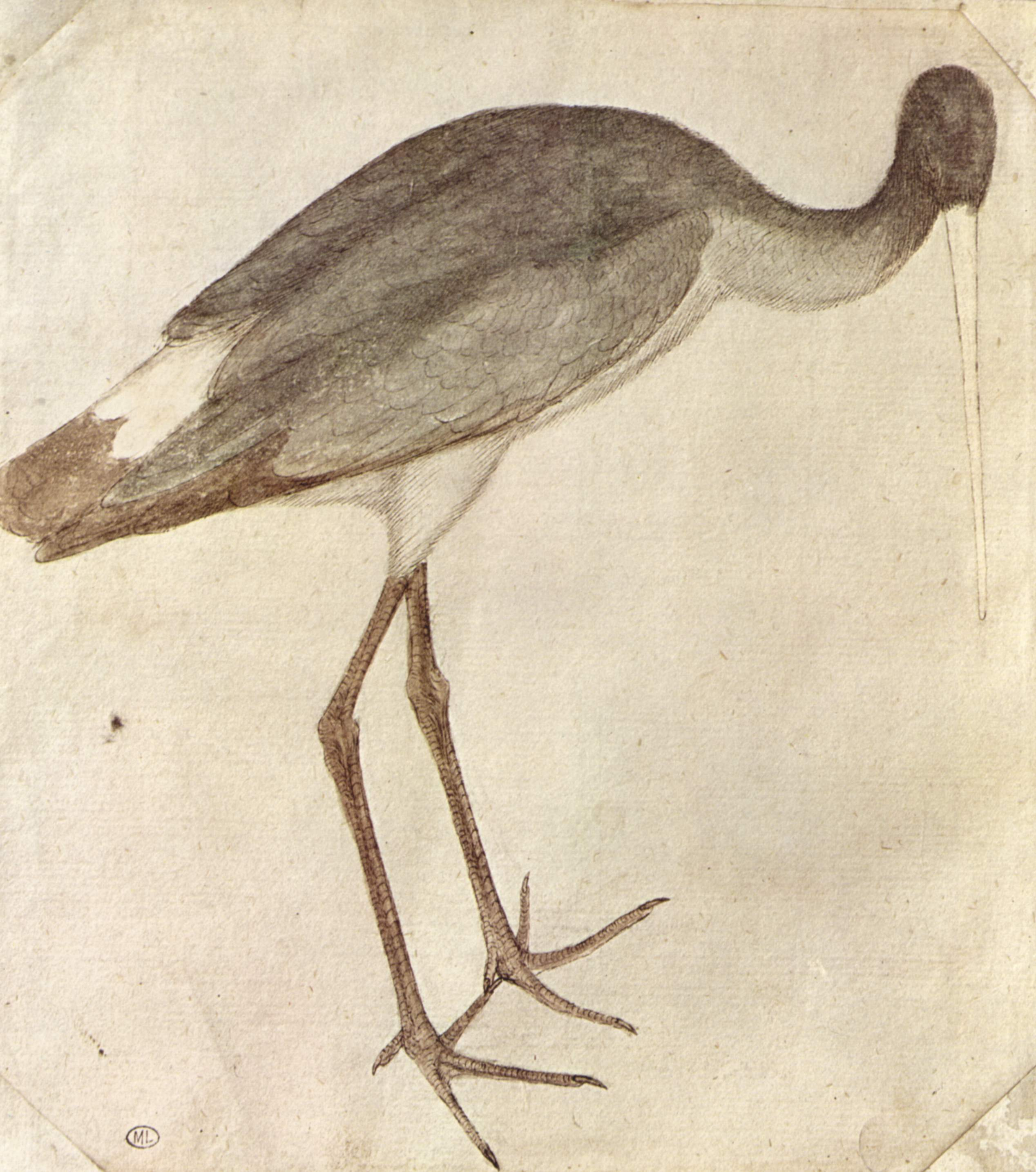
Stork

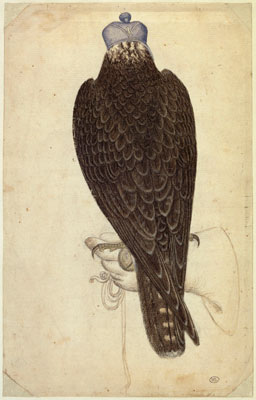
Falcon

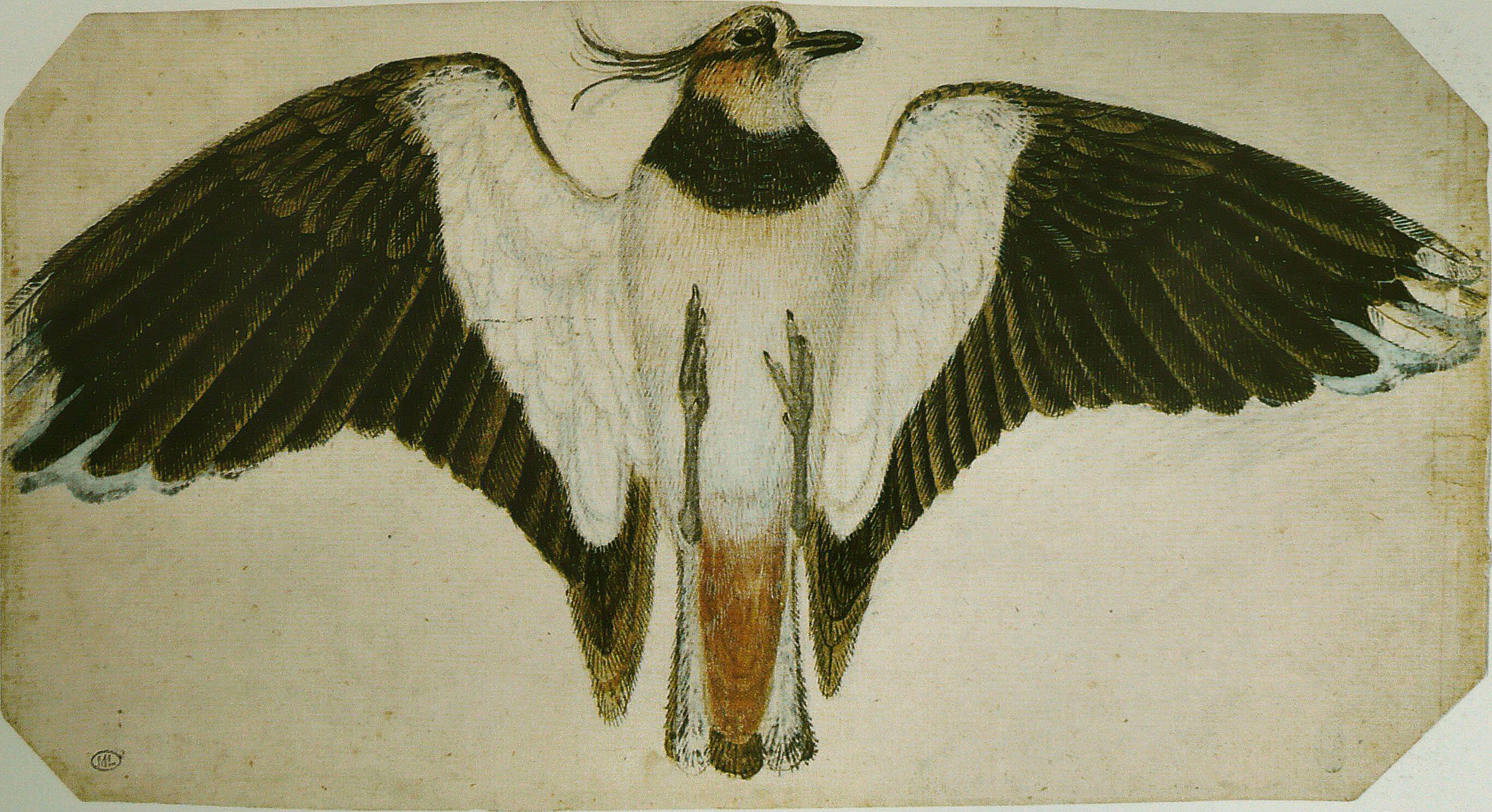
Lapwing

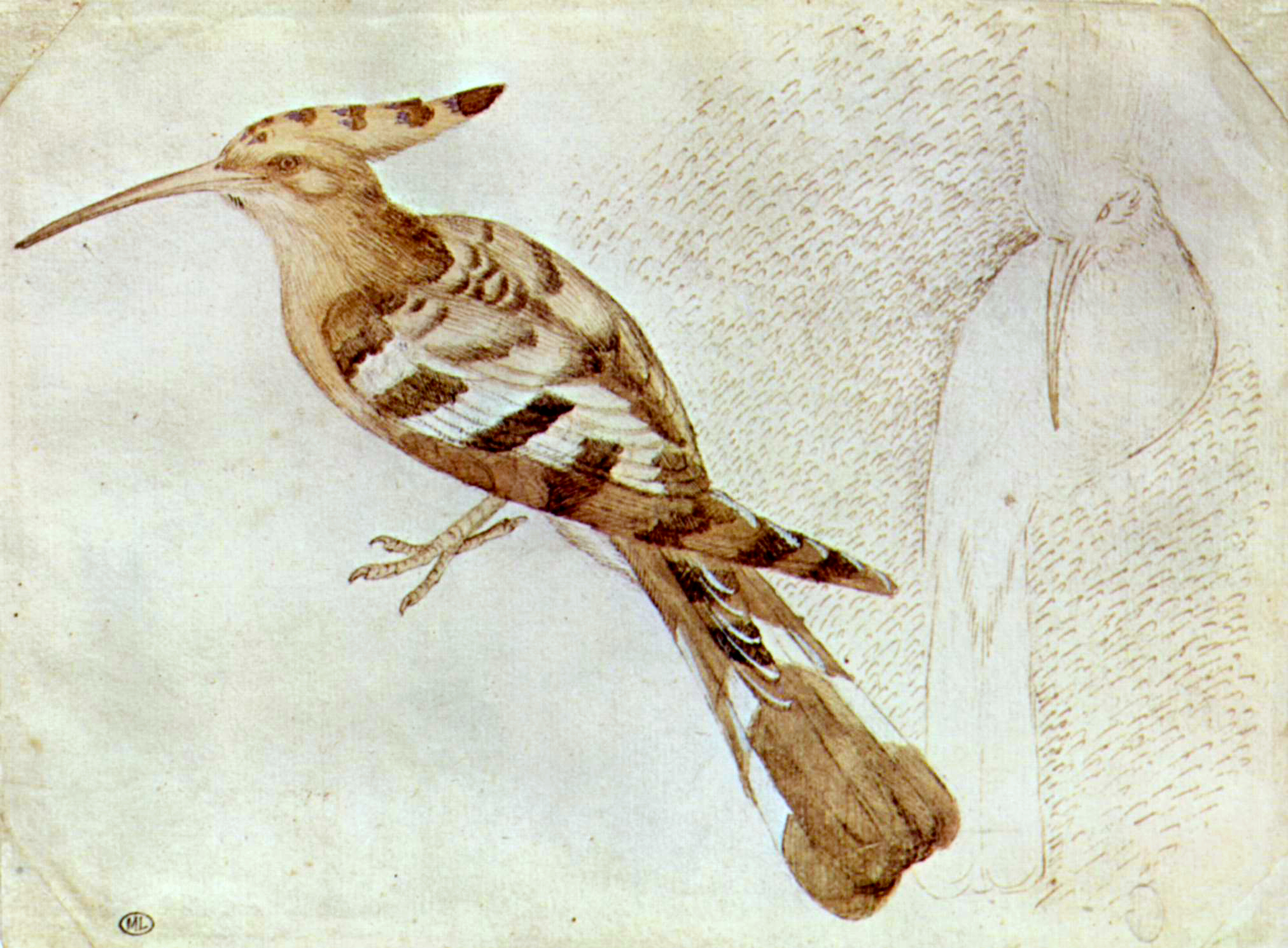
Hoopoe

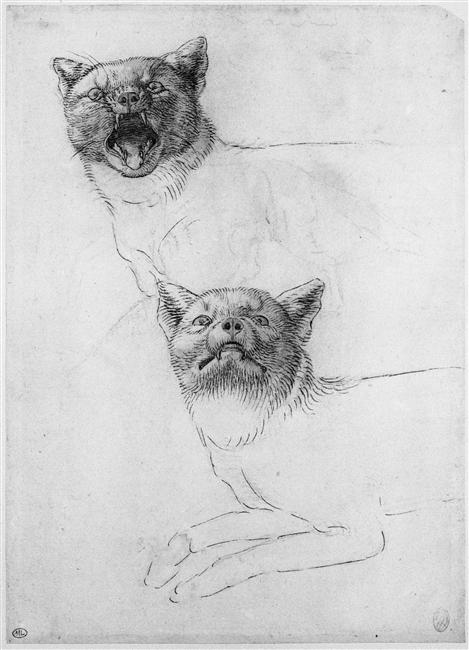
Studies of Cats

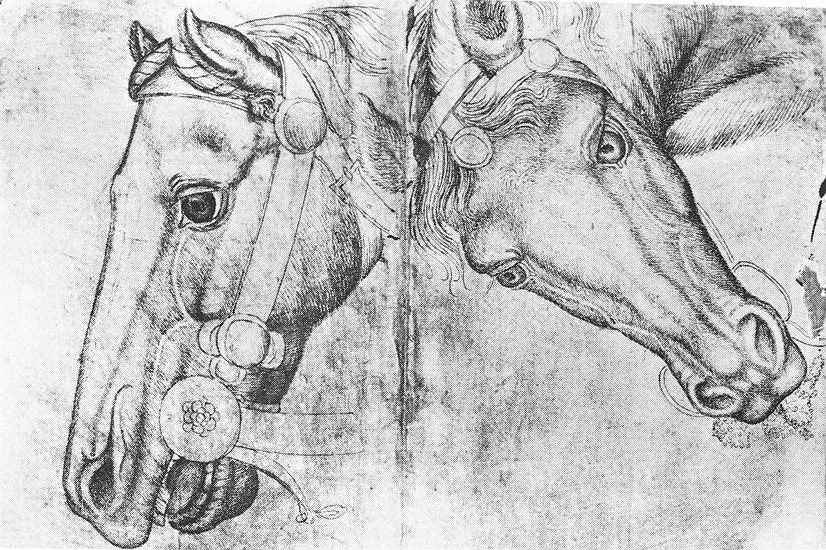
Studies of Horses

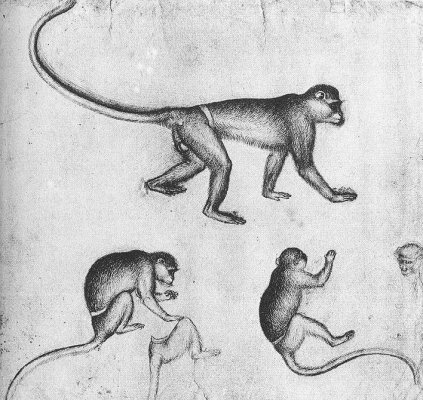
Monkeys

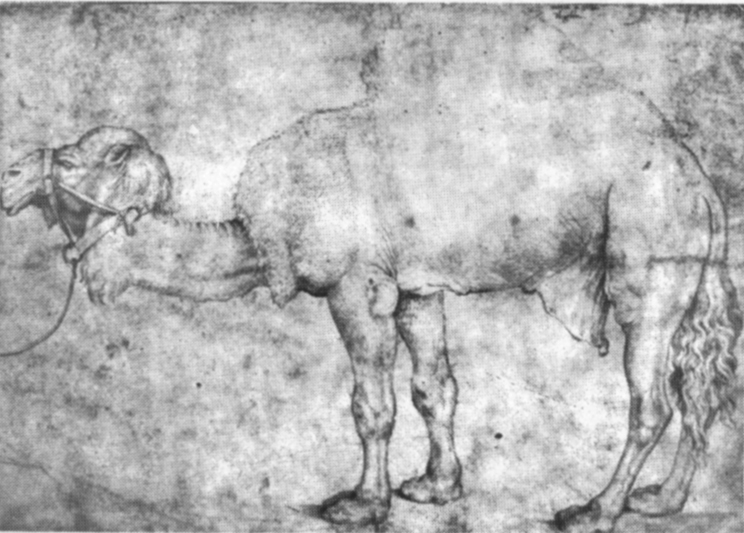
Camel

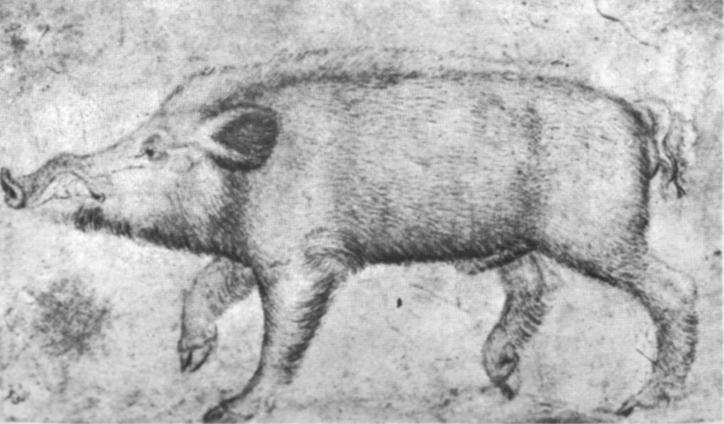
Boar

== See also ==
- Giorgio Vasari
