= Ludovico Sforza =

Duke of Milan (1452–1508)

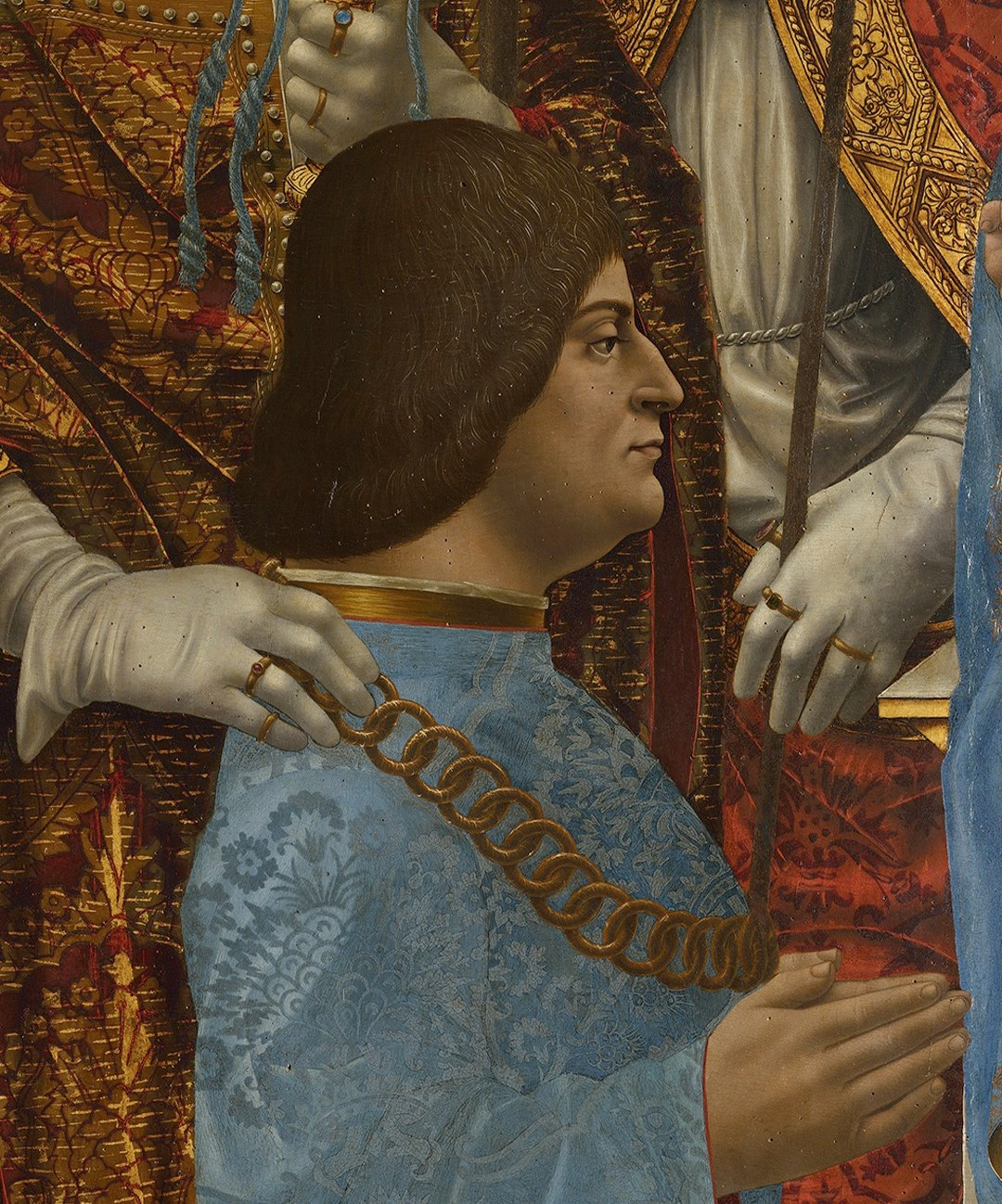
- Ludovico's portrait in the Pala Sforzesca, 1494–1495 (Pinacoteca di Brera in Milan) (Note: This depiction is one of the most famous portraits of Ludovico. The altarpiece with which is originates is by an unknown artist, thought to from be the circle of Leonardo da Vinci.)

Duke of Milan
- Reign: 21 October 1494 – 6 September 1499
- Predecessor: Gian Galeazzo Sforza
- Successor: Louis XII of France

Regent of Milan
- Regency: 7 October 1480 – 21 October 1494
- Monarch: Gian Galeazzo Sforza
- Born: 3 August 1452; Milan, Duchy of Milan
- Died: 27 May 1508 (aged 55); Château de Loches, Kingdom of France
- Spouse: Beatrice d'Este
- Issue Detail: Massimiliano Sforza; Francesco II Sforza; Giovanni Paolo I Sforza (illegitimate); Bianca Giovanna Sforza
- House: Sforza
- Father: Francesco I Sforza
- Mother: Bianca Maria Visconti

Ludovico Maria Sforza (Italian: [ludoˈviːko maˈriːa ˈsfɔrtsa]; 3 August 1452 – 27 May 1508), also known as Ludovico il Moro (Italian: [il ˈmɔːro]; 'the Moor'), (Note: Il Moro literally means 'the Moor', an epithet said by Francesco Guicciardini to have been given to Ludovico because of his dark complexion. In modern Italian, moro is also a synonym for bruno, the masculine equivalent of 'brunette'. Some scholars have posited that the name Moro came from Ludovico's coat of arms, which contained the mulberry tree (the fruit of which is called mora in Italian). Still others have posited that Maurus was simply Ludovico's second name.) and called the "arbiter of Italy" by historian Francesco Guicciardini, was an Italian nobleman who ruled as the Duke of Milan from 1494 to 1499.

Although he was the fourth son and excluded from his family's succession, Ludovico was ambitious and managed to obtain dominion over Milan. He first assumed the regency from his sister-in-law Bona, then took over from his deceased nephew Gian Galeazzo, whom some say he poisoned. Considered enlightened, generous, and peaceful, he became a patron of artists and writers. His court in Milan became one of the most important in Europe during the Italian Renaissance.

Ludovico was considered fearful and of a fickle nature. To face the threats of King Alfonso II of Naples, Ludovico called the French to Italy; when threatened by the French, he could not face the danger, and was saved only thanks to the intervention of his wife, Beatrice. When she died, he went into a depression and the state of his court fell from jubilance to despair. He finally succumbed to King of France Louis XII, who imprisoned him in France where he died.

== Early life ==
=== Childhood ===
Ludovico Sforza was born on 3 August 1452 at Milan, in what is now Lombardy. His position as the fourth son of Francesco I Sforza and Bianca Maria Visconti meant that he was not expected to become ruler of Milan, but his mother still encouraged a broad education.

==== Education ====
Despite being a fourth-born son and therefore unlikely to rise to the position of duke, his mother, Bianca, wanted him to be well-educated. In the style of the Renaissance spirit, Ludovico received a varied education, especially in the field of classical readings. Under the tutelage of many teachers, including the humanist Francesco Filelfo and the poet Giorgio Valagussa, Ludovico received lessons in Greek, Latin, theology, painting, sculpture, as well as being instructed in matters of government and administration of the state. His tutelage also included physical exercise in the form of fencing, hunting, wrestling, horseback riding, jumping, dancing, and the game of ropeball.

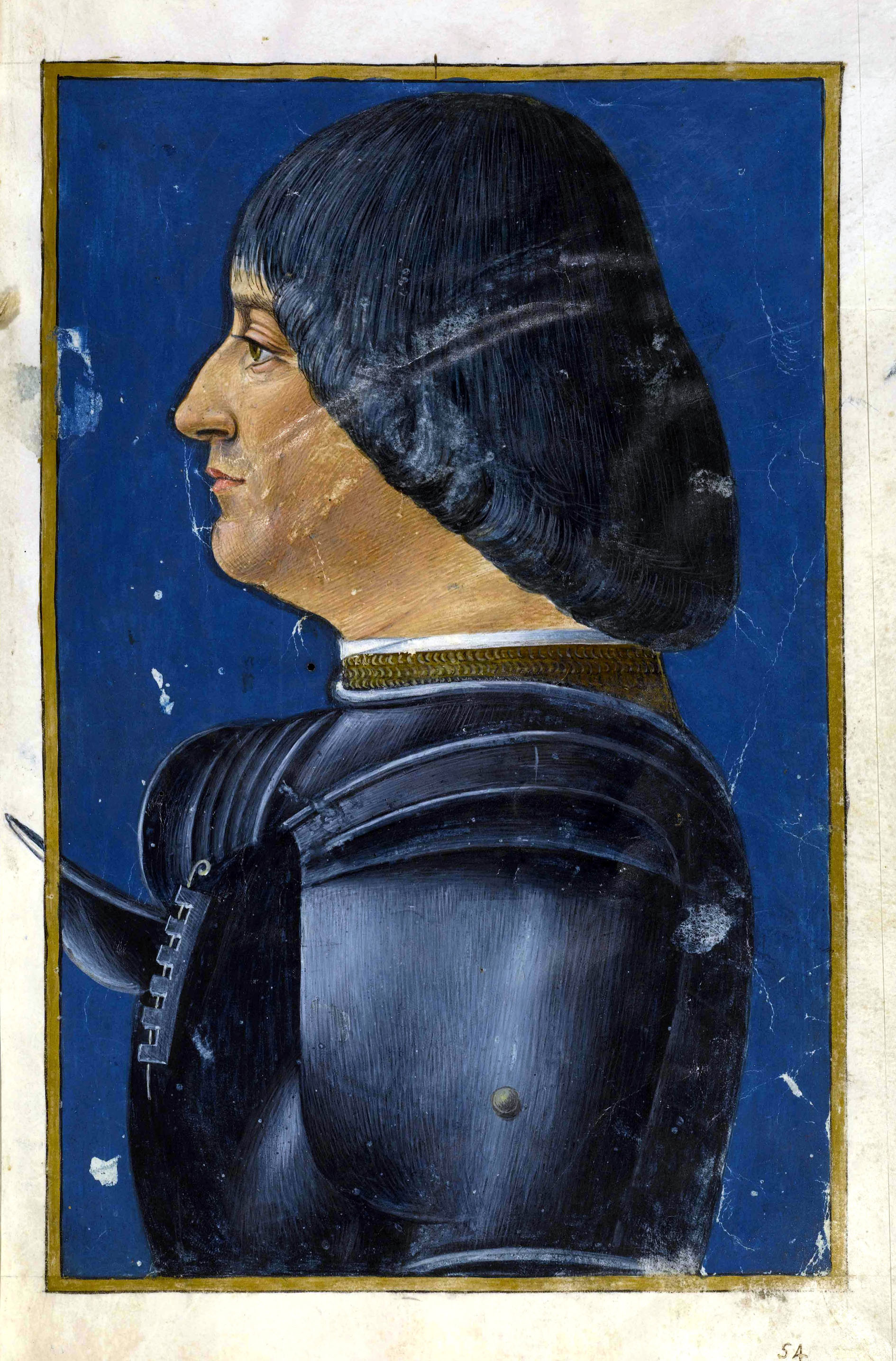
Ludovico Sforza by Giovanni Ambrogio de Predis

Cicco Simonetta described him as the most well-versed and rapid learner among the children of Francesco Sforza, his father. His father and mother showed him particular attention, as evidenced by the extensive correspondence between them. At the age of seven, together with his mother and brothers, he welcomed Pope Pius II to Mantua on a visit to the city, marking Ludovico's first public outing on an official occasion. At the age of eleven, he dedicated an oration in Latin to his father. Ludovico spent his childhood with his brothers and sisters in the Broletto Vecchio palace in Milan and in the Visconti Castle in Pavia.

==== Under the rule of Galeazzo Maria ====
When their father Francesco died in 1466, the family titles passed to Galeazzo Maria, the eldest brother. Ludovico was conferred the courtesy title of Count of Mortara.

Within ten days, Ludovico was in Cremona to keep the lands of the duchy united and encourage the inhabitants of the city to pay tributes of loyalty to the new duke.

He continued to deal with diplomatic missives, remaining in Cremona until the following year, when he went to Genoa to welcome his sister Ippolita, wife of Alfonso of Aragon. On 6 June 1468 he was again in Genoa to welcome Bona of Savoy and escorted her together with his brother Tristan to Milan where, on 7 July, her wedding with Duke Galeazzo Maria took place. He was later appointed as the ambassador to the King of France and then to Bologna. In January 1471 he went to Venice on behalf of the duke. He was able to improve diplomatic relations between the Duchy of Milan and the Republic of Venice by giving a speech which was well received by the doge. In March 1471 he accompanied Duke Galeazzo Maria on his journey to Florence, and in August of the same year to Rome for the coronation of Pope Sixtus IV. In September 1471 he journeyed to the court of Turin.

Duke Galeazzo Maria seemed to have a particular fondness for Ludovico. In 1471, the Duke established in his will that should he die without grandchildren, the Duchy of Milan would pass to Ludovico even before the other brothers. Ludovico hid the Duke's well-known relationship with Lucia Marliani. A clear change occurred in 1476 when Ludovico was sent to France together with his brother Tristan in a sort of disguised exile. The Duke's wife, Bona, accused the two of having plotted to assassinate the duke, only to deny the accusation once she had made peace with Ludovico. It is unknown whether this was the reason for that exile, because according to the official version of Galeazzo Maria, it was his own brothers who asked him for permission to "go and see the world".

== Rise to power ==
Duke Galeazzo Maria was assassinated on 26 December 1476, at the hands of several high-ranking officials in the Milanese court. He was succeeded by his son Gian Galeazzo Maria, then only seven years old. Upon hearing the news, Ludovico hastily returned from France. Together with two other brothers, Ascanio and Ottaviano, as well as the condottieri Roberto Sanseverino, Donato del Conte, and Ibletto Fieschi, Ludovico tried to oppose the regency of Bona, believing the duchy was in fact in the hands of the ducal councilor Cicco Simonetta. The attempt failed and Ludovico was exiled to Pisa, Sforza Maria to Bari, and Ascanio to Perugia. Ottaviano tried to wade across the Adda to escape and drowned. Roberto Sanseverino fled to France, Donato del Conte was imprisoned in Monza, and Ibletto Fieschi was imprisoned in the Castello Sforzesco.

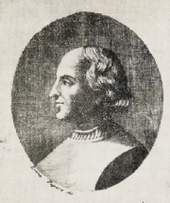
The powerful ducal councillor Cicco Simonetta, whom Moro had beheaded to "free" his sister-in-law and the government of Milan

In February 1479, Ludovico and Sforza Maria, supported by Ferrante of Aragon, entered the Republic of Genora with an army, where they joined Roberto Sanseverino and Ibletto Fieschi. The Duchess Bona and Cicco Simonetta convinced Federico Gonzaga and Ercole d'Este to gather a rival army and come to their rescue.

On 1 March 1479, Ludovico and his brother were declared rebels and enemies of the Duchy, and were denied the income they received by virtue of their mother's dowry. After carrying out looting in Pisa, the two returned to La Spezia. In mid-May, peace negotiations began between the two sides.

On 29 July, Sforza Maria died near Varese Ligure, allegedly poisoned on the order of Cicco Simonetta. Ferrante appointed Ludovica as the Duke of Bari, succeeding his brother. Following Roberto Sanseverino, on 20 August Ludovico resumed the march to Milan at the head of an army of 8,000 men, crossing the Passo di Centocroci and going up the Sturla Valley. On 23 August he took the citadel of Tortona after having convinced the Castellan Rafagnino Donati to join his cause. He then marched through to Sale, Castelnuovo Scrivia, Bassignana and Valenza.

After these successes, Simonetta sent Ercole d'Este, Duke of Ferrara, to stop the rebels. Many nobles close to the duchess pushed for reconciliation. Bona finally allowed herself to be persuaded by her lover, Antonio Tassino, who was probably in league with Ludovico, to forgive her brother-in-law. On 7 September, Ludovico entered the castle of Milan. Simonetta was untrusting of Ludovico, and firmly opposed reconciliation. He reportedly said to the Duchess Bona "I will lose my head and you, in time, will lose the state".

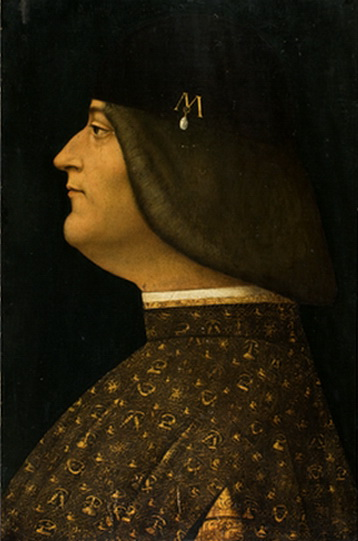
Giovanni Antonio Boltraffio, portrait of Ludovico il Moro, c. 1500, collection of Prince Trivulzio, Milan

The Milanese Ghibelline nobility, which included Pietro Pusterla, took advantage of Ludovico's presence in Milan to try to convince him to get rid of Simonetta, reminding him of all the sufferings that he and his brothers had suffered because of Simonetta. Ludovico, however, did not consider Simonetta a danger and judged it unnecessary to condemn to death a man now quite old and sick with gout. Pietro Pusterla planned an armed revolt against the Simonetta and sought the support of the Marquis of Mantua and Monferrato as well as Giovanni Bentivoglio and Alberto Visconti.

Ludovico, fearing a popular uprising, was forced to imprison Simonetta and his brother Giovanni, who were held in the prisons of the castle of Pavia.

=== Death of Cicco Simonetta and exile of Duchess Bona ===
Having secured the city, Ludovico recalled his brother Ascanio and Roberto Sanseverino to Milan. He sent envoys to forge or re-establish alliances with Lorenzo de' Medici, King Ferrante, and Pope Sixtus IV, and to prevent an alliance against him between the Swiss and the Republic of Venice.

Meanwhile, the Ghibelline nobility who had helped him in his rise to power, had lost Ludovico's favor and aligned themselves with his brother Ascanio. Ludovico, persuaded by Sanseverino, ordered the arrest of his brother and his exile in Ferrara. Pietro Pusterla, Giovanni Borromeo, Antonio Marliani, and many others of the Ghibelline faction were also exiled.

On 30 October, Cicco Simonetta was beheaded at Visconti Castle in Pavia, overlooking Visconteo Park. The death of Simonetta benefited Antonio Tassino, Simonetta's rival at court, who became increasingly arrogant. The Corio tells that when Ludovico and other Milanese nobles went to visit Tassino he would make them wait a long time outside the door until he had finished combing his hair. Tassino managed to convince Duchess Bona to replace Filippo Eustachi, prefect of the castle of Porta Giovia, with his father Gabriello. The prefect did not comply with the request and kept the oath made to the late Duke Galeazzo Maria to keep the castle until the age of majority of Gian Galeazzo.

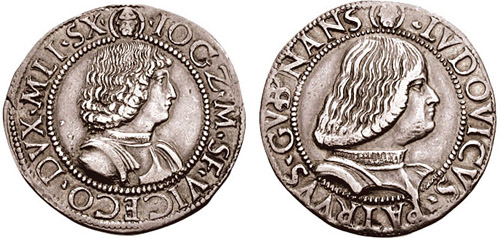
Silver head of the second half of the fifteenth century showing on the right (left) the portrait of Duke Gian Galeazzo Maria Sforza and on the reverse (right) that of his uncle Ludovico il Moro, his tutor

Ludovico decided to secretly bring his nephews Gian Galeazzo and Ermes into the castle, under the pretext of protecting them from the ambition of Tassino. He convened his council, and Bona was forced to sign the sentence of exile for Tassino and his family. Due to the forced separation from her lover, Bona gave signs of so-called hysteria. She tried to leave the duchy and threatened suicide if she was prevented, which persuaded Ludovico and Roberto Sanseverino to let her leave for France. On 3 November 1480, Bona ceded the regency to Ludovico, who was appointed tutor of the young duke Gian Galeazzo, At the insistence of his son, Ludovico decided to no longer reside in Abbiategrasso.

Bona went into such fury at his departure that, forgetting all her honour and dignity, she too decided to leave and pass over the mountains, and this bad resolution could never be revoked; but forgetting every filial love of her, in the hands of Lodovico Sforza she renounced the protection of her children and of the state.

— Bernardino Corio, Historia di Milano.

In 1481, perhaps orchestrated by Bona, there was an attempted poisoning against Ludovico and Roberto Sanseverino perpetrated by Cristoforo Moschioni, along with co-conspirators, the secretary of the Duchess Luigi Becchetti and the doctor Ambrogio Grifi. Moschioni was found innocent. The same year there was a second conspiracy planned by the Duchess against Ludovico, but once again it failed. The intercession of the Kingdom of France and the Duchy of Savoy prevented Bona from facing trial.

=== To the regency of the duchy (1480–1494) ===
==== Engagement to Beatrice d'Este ====
Ludovico initially planned to become Duke of Milan by marrying his sister-in-law Bona. Bona, however, was in love with Tassino, and so sought an alternative marriage for Ludovico. In 1480, she attempted to arrange a marriage with Ercole d'Este's eldest daughter Isabella. Unbeknownst to Bona, a few days earlier Isabella had been promised to Francesco Gonzaga, Marquis of Mantua. The second daughter Beatrice, at the time only five years old, was instead selected for Ludovico. Ludovico was persuaded by Bona and was supportive of the marriage. The engagement promised to be more convenient, as Beatrice lived at that time at the Aragonese court of Naples. Beatrice had been raised by King Ferrante, her grandfather, who was very fond of her. Ludovico saw this as an opportunity for an alliance with the king of Naples as well as with the Duke of Ferrara. King Ferrante accepted the engagement and the two were betrothed. Beatrice remained in Ferrara until 1485, when Ludovica persuaded her family to allow her to return to Milan to be educated in a court more suited to her role.

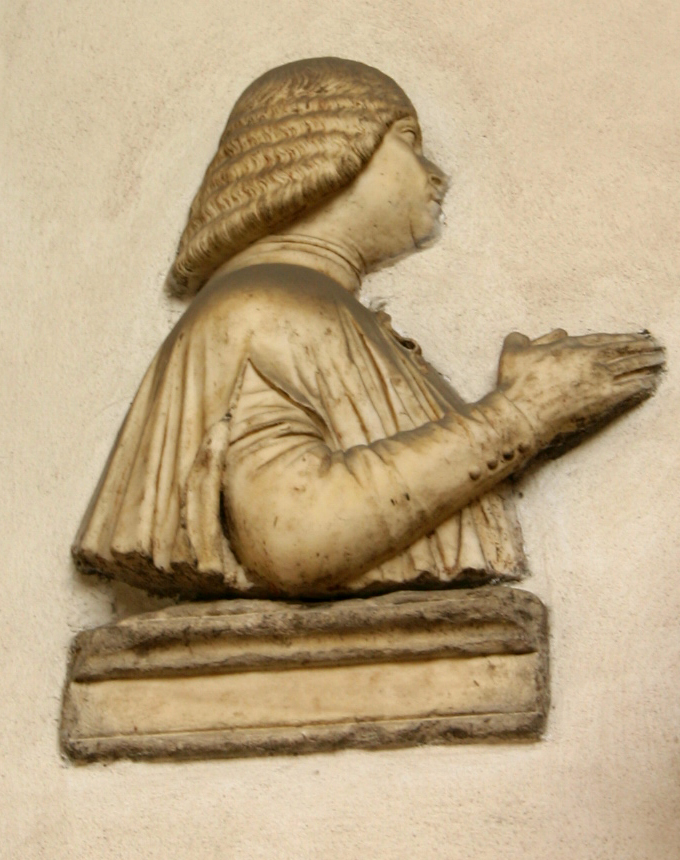
Bust of Ludovico il Moro. Rectory of the Basilica of Sant'Ambrogio in Milan, located on the entrance portal to the basilica, next to the effigy of his wife.

==== War of Ferrara ====
In 1482, the Republic of Venice along with the Papal States entered into war against the Duchy of Ferrara. Ludovico and the Duchy of Milan entered the war in favour of his future father-in-law, Ercole d'Este. To support the war, Ludovico sent forces commanded by Federico da Montefeltro, then, after the death of da Montefeltro, his half-brother Sforza Secondo. The Venetian army was commanded by Roberto Sanseverino d'Aragona. On 6 January 1483, Pope Sixtus IV abandoned the alliance with the Venetians and allied with Ferrara. The Venetians, with the help of Costanzo Sforza, devised a plan to make Ludovico abandon his alliance with Ferrara. On 15 July, the Venetian army crossed the Adda. Ludovico met with Alfonso of Aragon and other representatives of the alliance in Cremona and decided to immediately counterattack the Venetians. On 22 July, King Alfonso gathered the army in Monza. The following day the Venetian army led by Roberto Sanseverino, realizing that their plan had failed, retreated to Bergamo.

In the summer of 1483, Gian Francesco and Galeazzo Sanseverino, Roberto's sons, defected from the Venetian camp to pass respectively to the service of Alfonso of Aragon and Ludovico. Ludovico and Galeazzo would become close friends, and they remained as such throughout their lives. On 10 August, Ludovico and his brother Ascanio marched to Bergamo, forcing the surrender of many castles and threatening Bergamo itself. They managed to capture Romano after a three-day siege after which Ludovico returned to Milan.

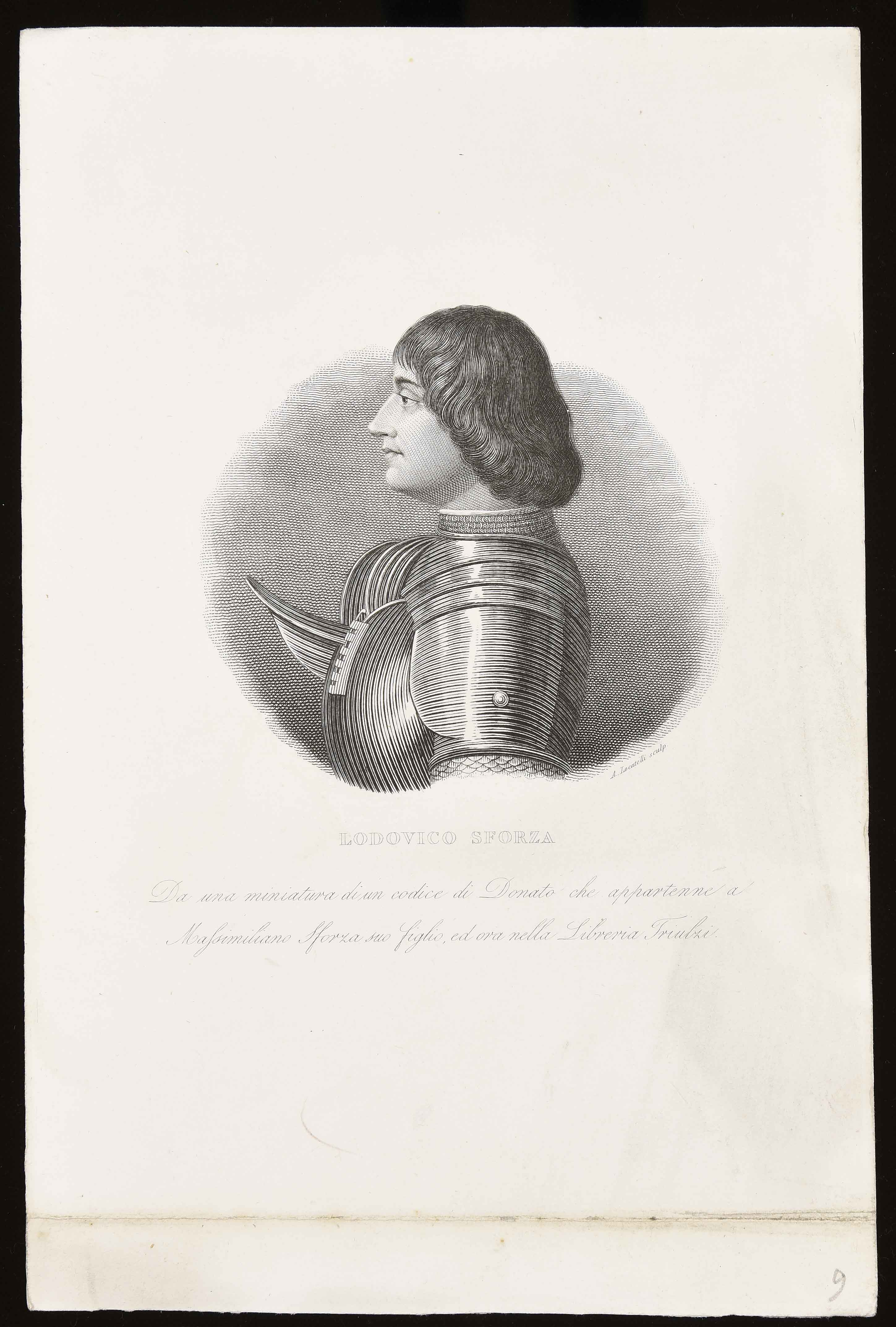
Chalcography in Italian Iconography of famous men and women: Ludovico il Moro, by Antonio Locatelli, 1837

Despite repeated success, Ferrara and its allies were unable to deal a decisive defeat to the Venetians. On 24 April 1484, the allies of Ferrara held a war council, meeting in the castle of Porta Giovia. There they decided to continue the war against the Republic of Venice, however, disagreements soon arose between Ludovico and Alfonso of Aragon. The Venetians, knowing that Ludovico had incurred massive debts in support of his father-in-law, offered him peace in exchange for money, provided that they retained control of the Polesine. Ludovico accepted and signed the agreement on 7 August in Bagnolo, against Ercole d'Este's wishes.

=== Marriage and private life ===
After the war, Ludovico's fiancée Beatrice had reached an age suitable for the wedding and her father was eager for a date to be set. Ludovico, however, as the Este ambassador Giacomo Trotti recorded, had met a woman named Cecilia Gallerani. She was described as being very beautiful and was often at Ludovico's side. Ludovico postponed his marriage to Beatrice three times, frustrating his future in-laws, who believed that he no longer intended to marry their daughter. Those close to Ludovico had been pressuring him for years to replace his nephew as the Duke of Milan, and wished for Beatrice to have a legitimate heir for him as soon as possible. In 1490, after thirteen months away, Ludovico's nephew Gian Galeazzo consummated the marriage with his wife Isabella of Aragon, who within a few days found herself pregnant. This event caused on the one hand the irritation Ludovico's allies, and on the other convinced him of the need to marry Beatrice.

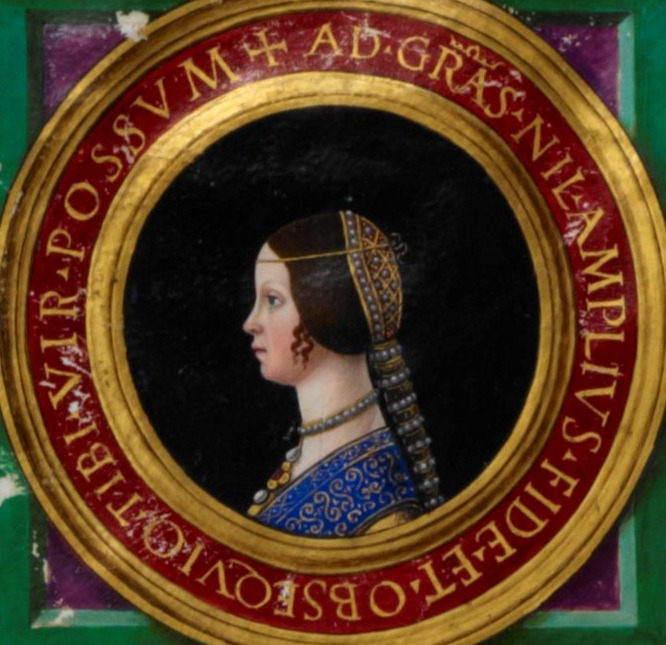
Miniature of Beatrice at 19, contained in the donation certificate dated 28 January 1494 with which her husband assigned her numerous lands, now preserved in the British Library in London

The wedding was set for the following January, and on 29 December 1490, the wedding procession left Ferrara to bring Beatrice to Milan. She was accompanied by her mother and other relatives. Beatrice's brother Alfonso and cousin Ercole were to be married to two princesses of the Sforza house on the same occasion: the first Anna Maria, daughter of the late Galeazzo Maria and niece of Ludovico, the second Angela, daughter of Carlo Sforza and Bianca Simonetta (daughter of Cicco Simonetta). On 18 January 1491, in a simple ceremony, Ludovico married Beatrice in the Ducal Chapel of the castle of Pavia. He had wanted the wedding to be celebrated in Pavia and not in Milan so as not to give the impression of attempting to challenge Gian Galeazzo, who had married Isabella of Aragon in the Duomo a few months earlier.

The marriage was declared to have been immediately consummated and the next morning Ludovico left for Milan to finish the preparations for the wedding party. In truth, the marriage remained secretly unconsummated for over a month, as the spouses had only met in person the day prior to the wedding. Additionally Ludovico, who at the time was thirty-eight years old, respected the youth and innocence of his bride, then fifteen, and did not want to force her to consume in a hurry. This aroused new concerns from his father-in-law Ercole, who urged for the marriage to be consummated immediately.

==== Marital bond ====
After the marriage, Ludovico became enamoured with his new wife. "S.r Ludovico hardly ever takes his eyes off the Duchess of Bari" wrote Tebaldo Tebaldi in August 1492, and already a short time after the wedding Galeazzo Visconti declared "There is such a great love between them that I don't think two people can love each other more". Ludovico was often seen kissing and caressing his wife, and he would stand beside bed for most of the day when she was sick. In a letter he wrote of her: "she is dearer to me than the light of the sun". It is uncertain whether Beatrice reciprocated this affection, but some historians believe she did. Ludovico's contemporaries noted, not without amazement, that Beatrice followed him everywhere, even in the course of her pregnancies. Her commitment to following Ludovico sometimes endangered her life, contrary to the custom of the time where women often remained to govern the house during their husbands absences. They were, in the short years they lived together, the model of an ideal couple.

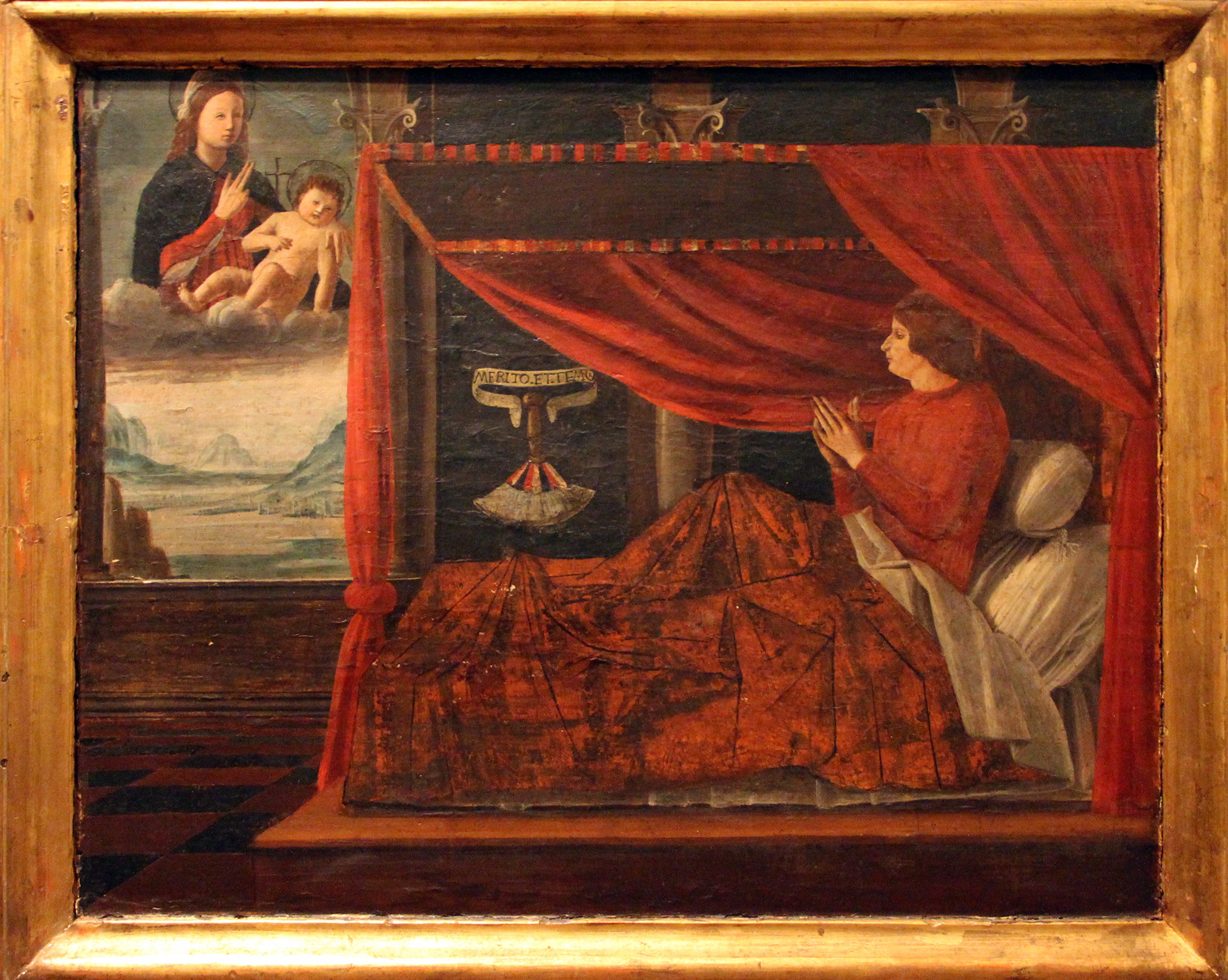
Ex voto to the Madonna of Ludovico back from a disease

The 15-year-old princess quickly charmed the Milanese court with her joyfulness and laughter. She loved extravagance, and helped make a reputation for Sforza Castle as a place of sumptuous festivals and balls. She enjoyed entertaining philosophers, poets, diplomats, and soldiers. Beatrice had good taste, and it is said that under her prompting her husband's patronage of artists became more selective. During this time artists such as Leonardo da Vinci and Donato Bramante were employed at the court. She would go on to give birth to Maximilian Sforza and Francesco II Sforza, future Dukes of Milan.

Craving power and ready to take it, [...] Beatrice had revealed an unsuspected character, a vigor [...] sure sign of an extremely tenacious will and firm intentions. And the Moor ended up loving her more than anyone could have foreseen.

— Luciano Chiappini, Gli Estensi

Correspondences between Ludovico and those close to him demonstrate the affection he held for Beatrice. In a letter written to his mother-in-law a few months after the birth of his first son, Ludovico told her how he approved of the baby and how "my wife and I, naked, carry him sometimes and we keep him between the two of us". Ludovico is noted for his concern to ensure his wife was satisfied at every whim. His correspondences also show a worry that she would discover times where he lied to her, for fear that she would no longer love him. He also attempted to shield her from tragedy, such as when Beatrice's mother passed in 1493. In a letter to his father-in-law, he apologized for the delaying the mourning ceremonies in Milan, as he was waiting for a better moment to tell Beatrice about her mother's death.

=== Ascension as Duke of Milan and the Italian Wars ===
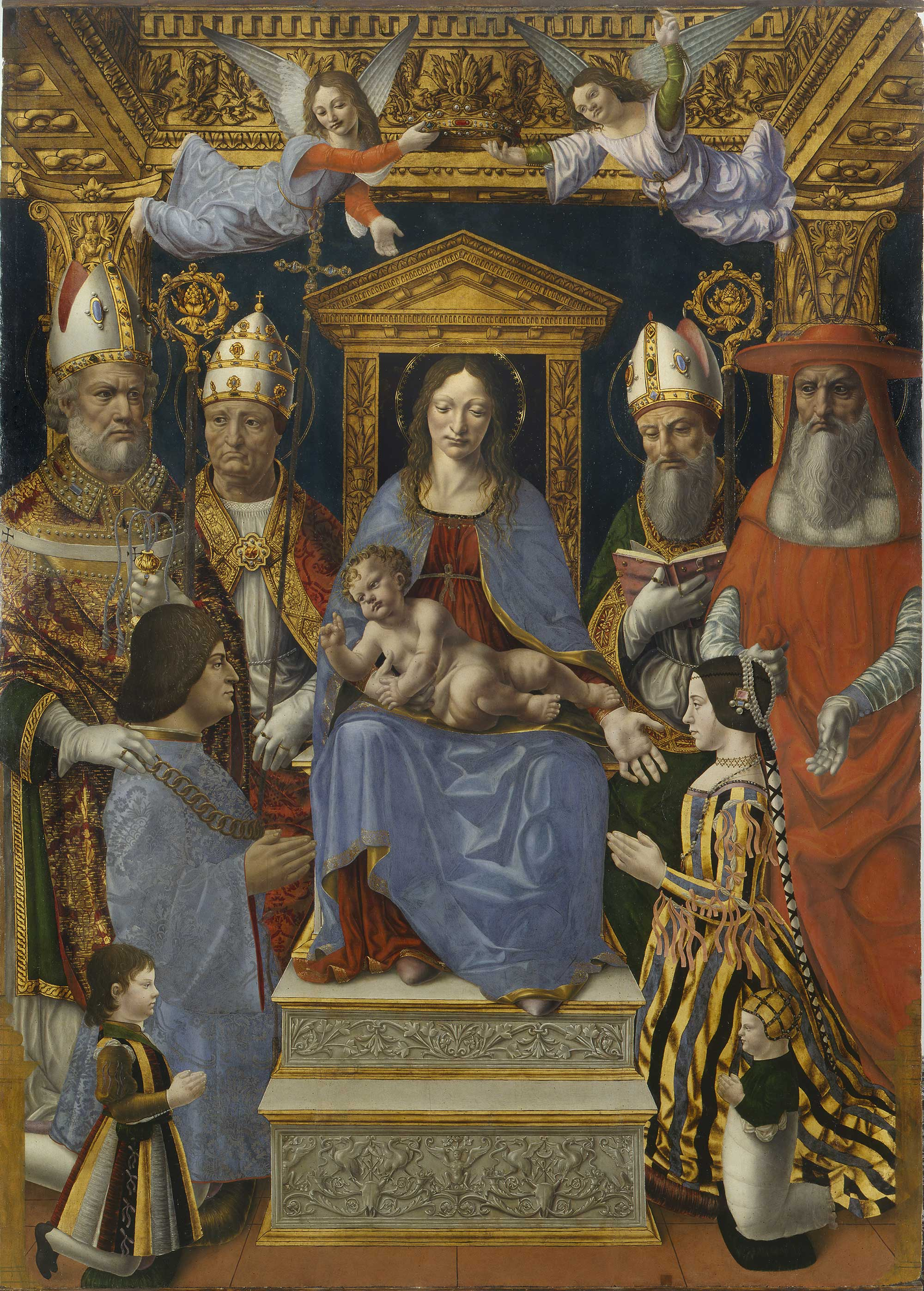
Pala Sforzesca, c. 1494, by an unknown author: on the left, Ludovico with his son Cesare; on the right, Beatrice with her son Ercole Massimiliano

Gian Galeazzo and his wife Isabella, after their lavish marriage, left Milan to set up court in Pavia. Gian Galeazzo did not have the desire to rule and he was happy to leave his uncle Ludovico in charge. His wife Isabella, however, turned out to be more ambitious and came into conflict with her cousin Beatrice. After Beatrice gave birth on 25 January 1493 to their first son, Ercole Massimiliano, she wished to have him, and not Isabella's son, appointed as Count of Pavia. The title of Count of Pavia was typically reserved for the heir to the Duchy of Milan.

Isabella requested the intervention of her grandfather King Ferrante of Naples, so that her husband, now of age, would be given control of the duchy. Ferrante, however, had no desire to intercede, fearing the possibility of starting a war. He declared that he loved both granddaughters in the same way and asked them to settle matters while he was alive. When Ferrante died, his successor Alfonso sided with his daughter Isabella. In an act of aggression against Ludovico, he occupied the city of Bari.

To respond to the occupation, Ludovico allied himself with Emperor Maximilian and with the King of France Charles VIII. King Charles mobilized his armies south and conquered the kingdom of Naples, which Charles considered his legitimate possession, having allegedly been stolen from France by the Aragonese. Emperor Maximilian promised to publicly recognize Ludovico's succession to the duchy and to defend his interests, thus legitimizing the usurpation. To solidify the pact he married Bianca Maria Sforza, sister of the young Gian Galeazzo. This marriage brought him the sum of 400,000 ducats as a dowry, plus another 100,000 for the investiture, as well as many gifts.

On 11 September 1494, Charles VIII arrived in Asti and was received with great honors by Ludovico and Beatrice. With him also came his cousin Louis d'Orléans, who believed he was entitled to the title Duke of Milan, being a descendant of Valentina Visconti. Despite the latent hostilities, the first months of the visit passed without issue, and Ludovico used the charm of his wife Beatrice to placate the French and thus distract them. Eventually, Ludovico became jealous of a relationship forming between the Baron of Beauvau and his wife Beatrice, and he chose to send Beatrice back to Milan.

== Duke of Milan ==
On 22 October 1494, Duke Gian Galeazzo died under mysterious circumstances. Officially, he was said to have died as a result of having not followed the treatment prescribed by his personal doctors for a long-term illness he suffered, and for the immoderate life he led. Unofficially, in the opinion of many prominent contemporaries such as Niccolò Machiavelli and Francesco Guicciardini, it was believed that the Duke was poisoned by his uncle Ludovico. Historian Malaguzzi Valeri disagrees with this opinion, pointing to how Ludovico was interested in the approval of his nephew, how he often sent him gifts such as dogs, horses and falcons, and how he was kept constantly informed of the care given to him. Valeri also notes that Gian Galeazzo had suffered stomach disorders since age 13 and that he continuously disobeyed the recommendations of doctors, continuing to drink large quantities of wine, going on fatiguing hunting trips, and engaging in a promiscuous sex life.

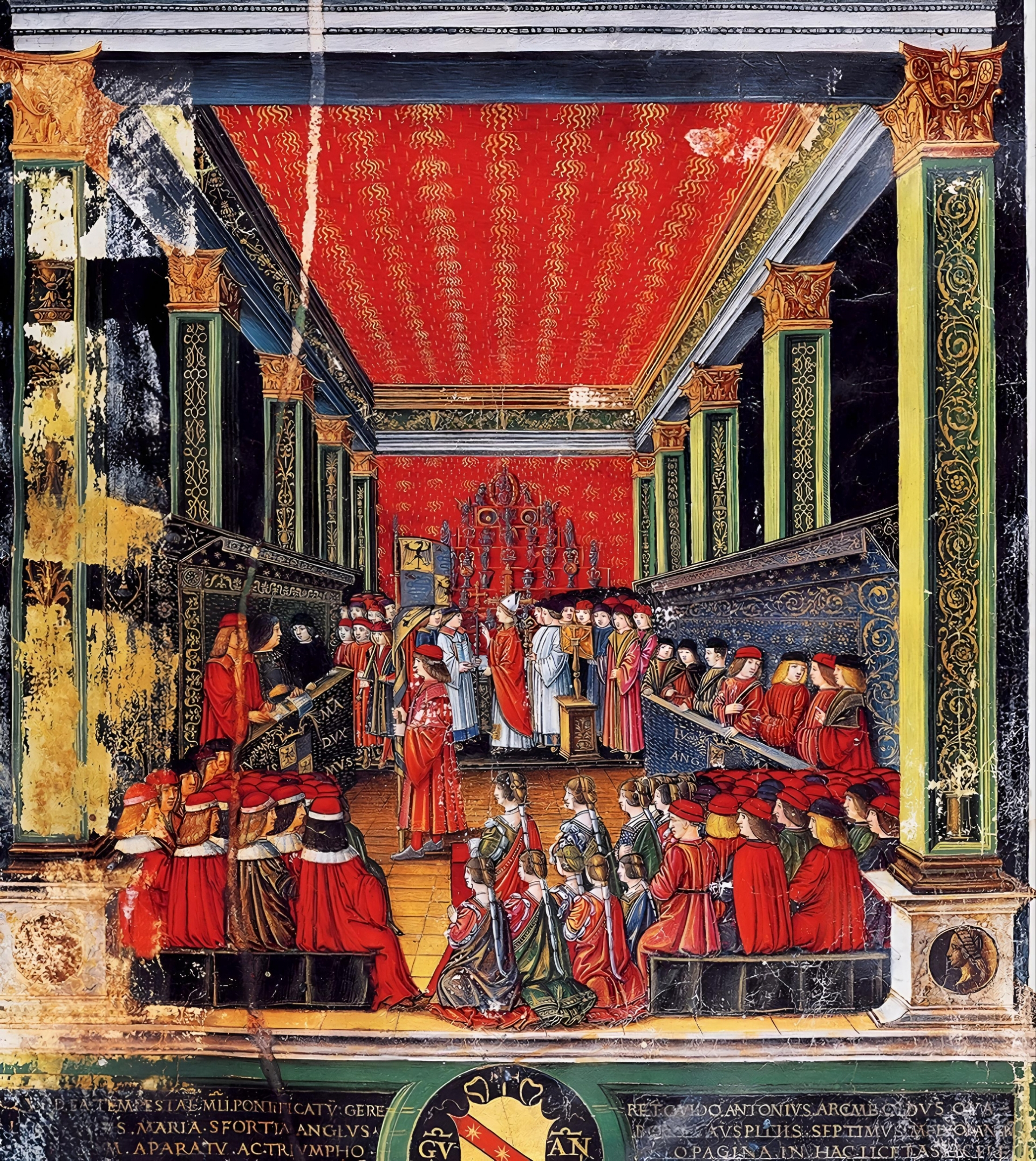
The ducal investiture of Ludovico il Moro, illuminated page by the Messale Arcimboldi in the Chapter Library of the Duomo of Milan. In the court at the top, on the left, Ludovico; in front of him, at the centre of the scene, Galeazzo Sanseverino, who has just received from his father-in-law the large golden banner with the black eagle; behind the latter, you can recognize the blond count of Melzo, who holds resting on his shoulder the sword received shortly before by his uncle; at the bottom, on the right, is finally the ranks of women, led by Duchess Beatrice.

Ludovico immediately succeeded him with the support of the Milanese nobles, supplanting the legitimate heirs, thus reaching the apex of political power in the region.

It was during this time that Charles VIII conquered Naples, however, neither Ludovico nor his wife were particularly pleased with this victory. They had hoped Charles' campaign would frighten King Alfonso II and keep him engaged on another front, so as to distract him from Milan. Ludovico had counted on the fact that the lords of Italy, and especially Florence, would not let Charles pass. This defense was undermined by Piero de' Medici, who until then had been the strongest ally of the king of Naples. Frightened, Piero ended up throwing himself at the feet of the king of France, granting him not only free passage to Tuscany but even Pisa and Livorno, plus the sum of 120,000 florins. At this point Ludovico began to worry about the excessive interference of the French in the region, and the blatant threats of the Duke of Orléans. He decided to abandon his alliance with France, siding instead with the Holy League.

=== The siege of Novara ===
To respond to the threats of the Duke of Orléans in regard to his aspirations for the Duchy of Milan, Ludovico planned to attack the Duke's stronghold of Asti. Unfortunately for Ludovico, the Duke of Orléans anticipated this move and countered it by occupying the cities of Novara and Vigevano.

Ludovico, worried for his family's safety, retreated with his wife and children into the Rocca del Castello in Milan. Still feeling unsafe, Ludovico made plans with the Spanish ambassador to leave the duchy to take refuge in Spain. As Bernardino Corio writes, this was strongly opposed by his wife Beatrice and some members of the council, who convinced him to remain in Milan. The situation, however, remained unstable. Due to the expenses incurred for the investiture and dowry of Bianca Maria, the state was on the verge of financial collapse. There was no money to maintain the army and there was fear of a popular uprising. Some nobles and citizens were openly supportive of the Duke of Orléans.

At this time, Ludovico suffered what some historians speculate was a stroke. His hand had become paralyzed, and he never left the bedroom and was rarely seen. "The Duke of Milan has lost his feelings," Malipiero writes, "he abandons himself". To make matters worse, his father-in-law Ercole d'Este, together with the Florentines, was said to have secretly aligned themselves with the Duke of Orleans.

Disaster was averted by his wife Beatrice who, while temporarily appointed governor of Milan, ensured the loyalty of the nobles, then met with military captains in person at Vigevano to supervise their move against the Duke of Orleans. Some historians believe that if the Duke had attempted an assault on Milan at that time he would have taken it since the defences were severely weakened. Beatrice's demonstration of strength was perhaps able to make him believe the defences were stronger than they were, and so the Duke of Orleans did not make an attempt and instead retreated to Novara. This hesitation was fatal to his campaign, as it allowed the Milanese time to reorganize their troops and surround him, forcing him into a long siege.

Loys duc d'Orleans [...] en peu de jours mist en point une assez belle armée, avecques la quelle il entra dedans Noarre et icelle print, et en peu de jours pareillement eut le chasteau, laquelle chose donna grant peur à Ludovic Sforce et peu près que desespoir à son affaire, s'il n'eust esté reconforté par Beatrix sa femme [...] O peu de gloire d'un prince, à qui la vertuz d'une femme convient luy donner couraige et faire guerre, à la salvacion de dominer!

— Cronaca di Genova scritta in francese da Alessandro Salvago
Translation:

Louis Duke of Orleans [...] in a few days he prepared a fairly fine army, with which he entered Novara and took it, and in a few days he also had the castle, which caused great fear to Ludovico Sforza and he was close to despair over his fate, had he not been comforted by his wife Beatrice [...] O little glory of a prince, to whom the virtue of a woman must give him courage and make war, for the salvation of the domain!

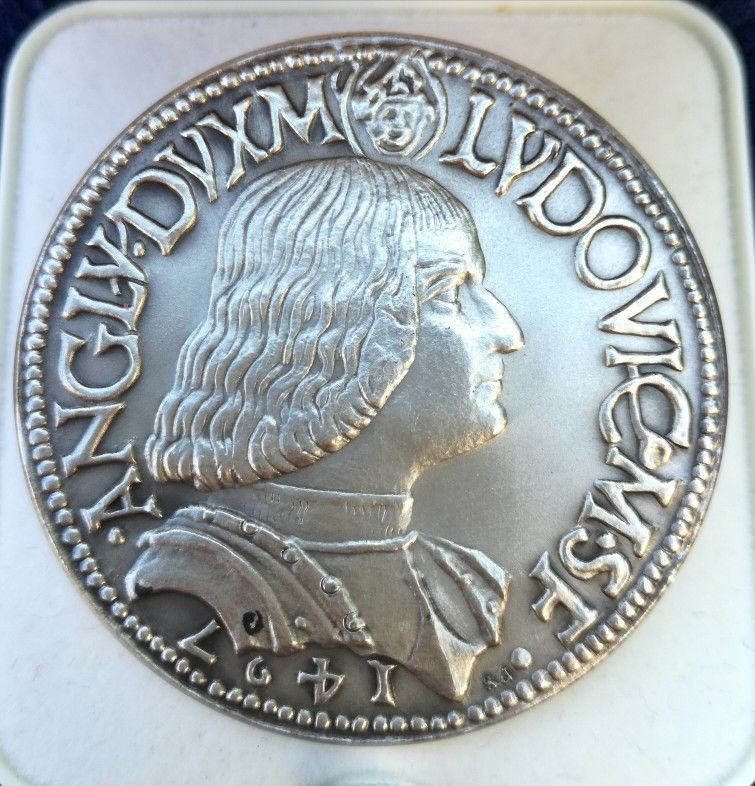
Silver reproduction (1989) of the testone that Ludovico had minted in 1497 with his own effigy on the one hand and of his wife Beatrice on the other, immediately after her death

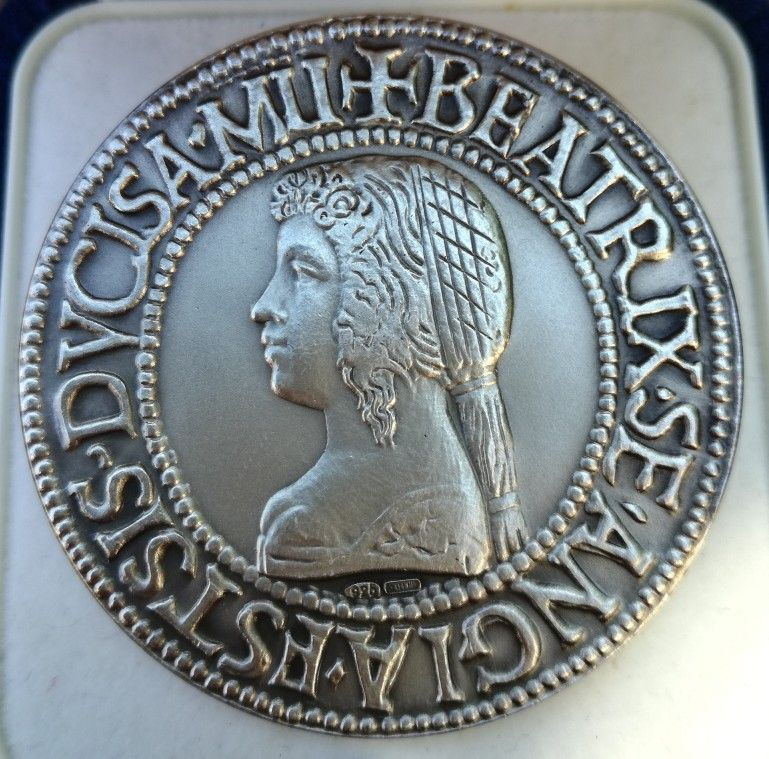
One of the first examples of coinage of this type, testimony of great love and admiration towards his wife

On 6 July 1495, the Battle of Fornovo took place. The Holy League's forces took heavy casualties but were unable to stop Charles' march to Asti. (Note: Malipiero mentions the League's failure to stop the French from reaching Asti.) In response, Ludovico redirected 70 tons of bronze to be used to make cannons. The bronze was originally intended to be used for an equestrian statue designed by Leonardo da Vinci.

In early August, Ludovico, finally healed, returned to deal with the war, and together with his wife went to reside at the Novara camp.

On 24 September, a fight broke out in the camp between some German and Italian soldiers. While the exact cause of the fight is unknown, the Germans were said to have wanted to make "cruel revenge" against the Italians. Ludovico, fearing for his wife's safety, begged Francesco Gonzaga to keep Beatrice safe. Gonzaga, "with an intrepid spirit", rode among the Germans and with great effort managed to mediate peace. Upon learning of Gonzaga's success "Ludovico became the happiest man in the world, seeming to him that he had recovered the State and his life, and together with wife's honor, for whose safety he feared more than for everything else".

In the meantime, the surrender of the Duke or Orleans was greatly anticipated. The Novara garrison was decimated by famine and epidemics, and Louis d'Orleans himself had fallen ill. In order to keep his men from surrendering, the Duke or Orleans falsely told them that the king would soon come to their rescue. This, of course, did not happen and he finally had to surrender, accepting an offer of safe conduct to the camp of King Charles. Of the few surviving soldiers, many died soon after from eating too much fruit after prolonged fasting.

Beatrice d'Este managed to expel from Novara the Duke of Orleans, who had seized it, directly threatening Milan over which she boasted rights of possession. Peace was signed, and Charles returned to France, without having drawn any serious fruit from his enterprise. Lodovico Sforza rejoiced in this result. But it was a brief jubilae his.

— Francesco Giarelli, Storia di Piacenza dalle origini ai nostri giorni

=== Death of Beatrice ===
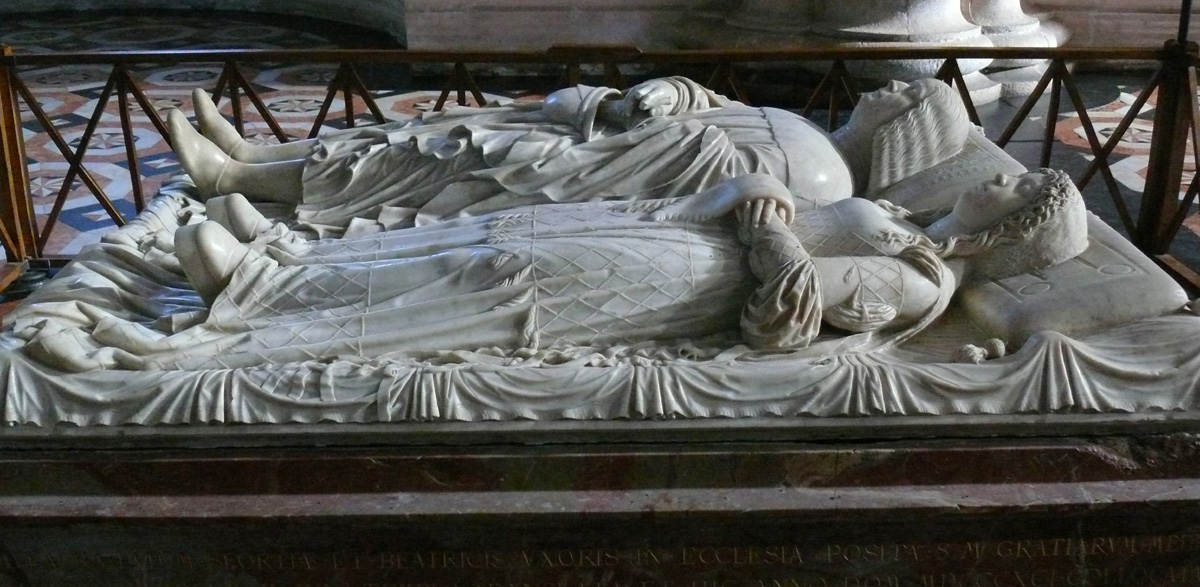

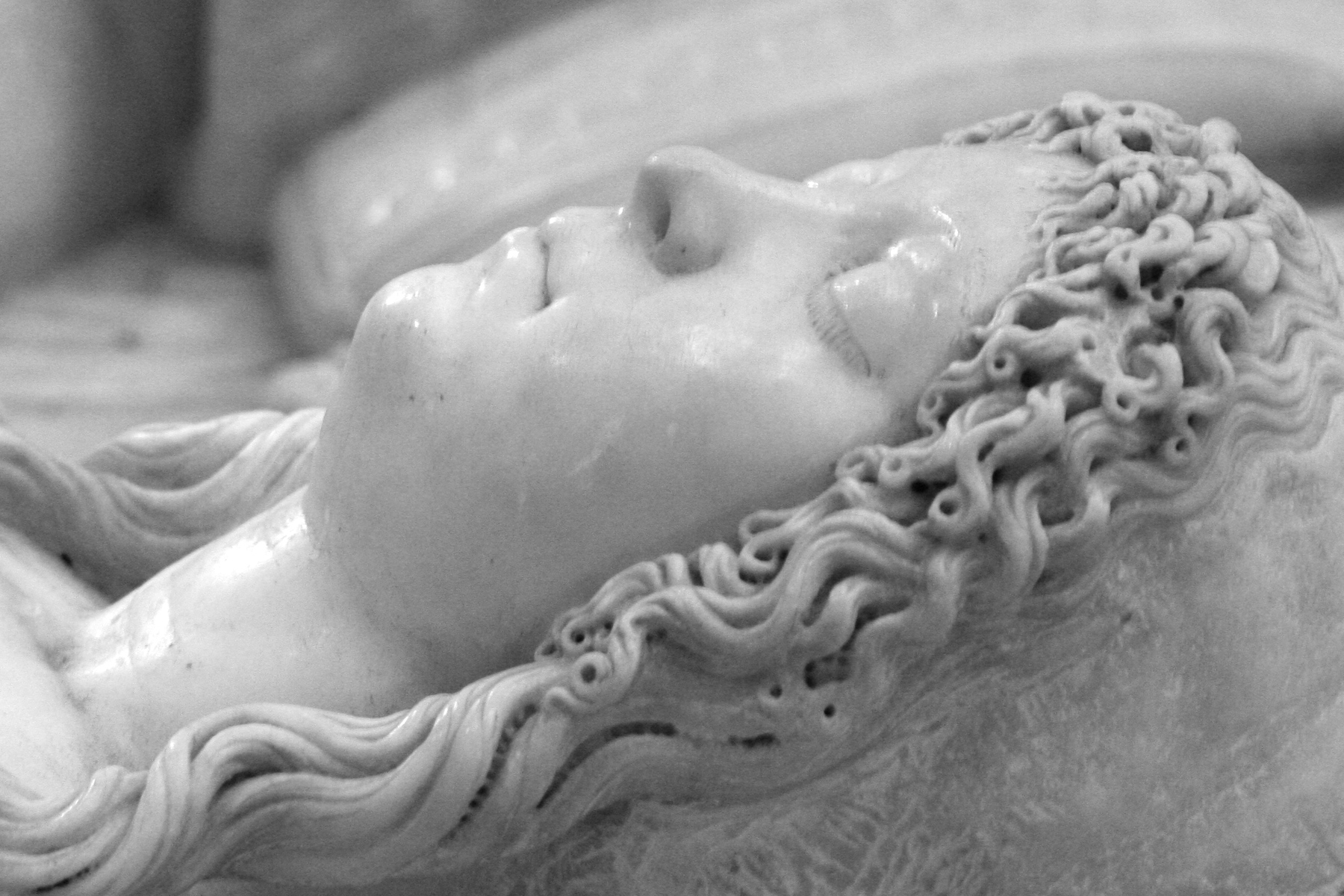
Certosa di Pavia, Tomb of Ludovico il Moro and Beatrice d'Este by Cristoforo Solari

In 1496, while Beatrice was expecting her third child, Ludovico met Lucrezia Crivelli, lady-in-waiting to his wife, who became his mistress. Beatrice, who previously had shown little jealously with her husbands infidelities, realized that Ludovico had this time fallen in love with Lucrezia. Beatrice opposed the relationship, however this did little to change Ludovico's actions. Lucrezia became pregnant with Ludovico's child only a few months after Beatrice had also become pregnant. She began to pull away from Ludovico, straining their marriage. Her sorrow deepened with the death of her closest friend Bianca Giovanna Sforza. Humiliated, embittered, and saddened, Beatrice died in childbirth the night of 2 January 1497.

==== Ludovico in mourning ====
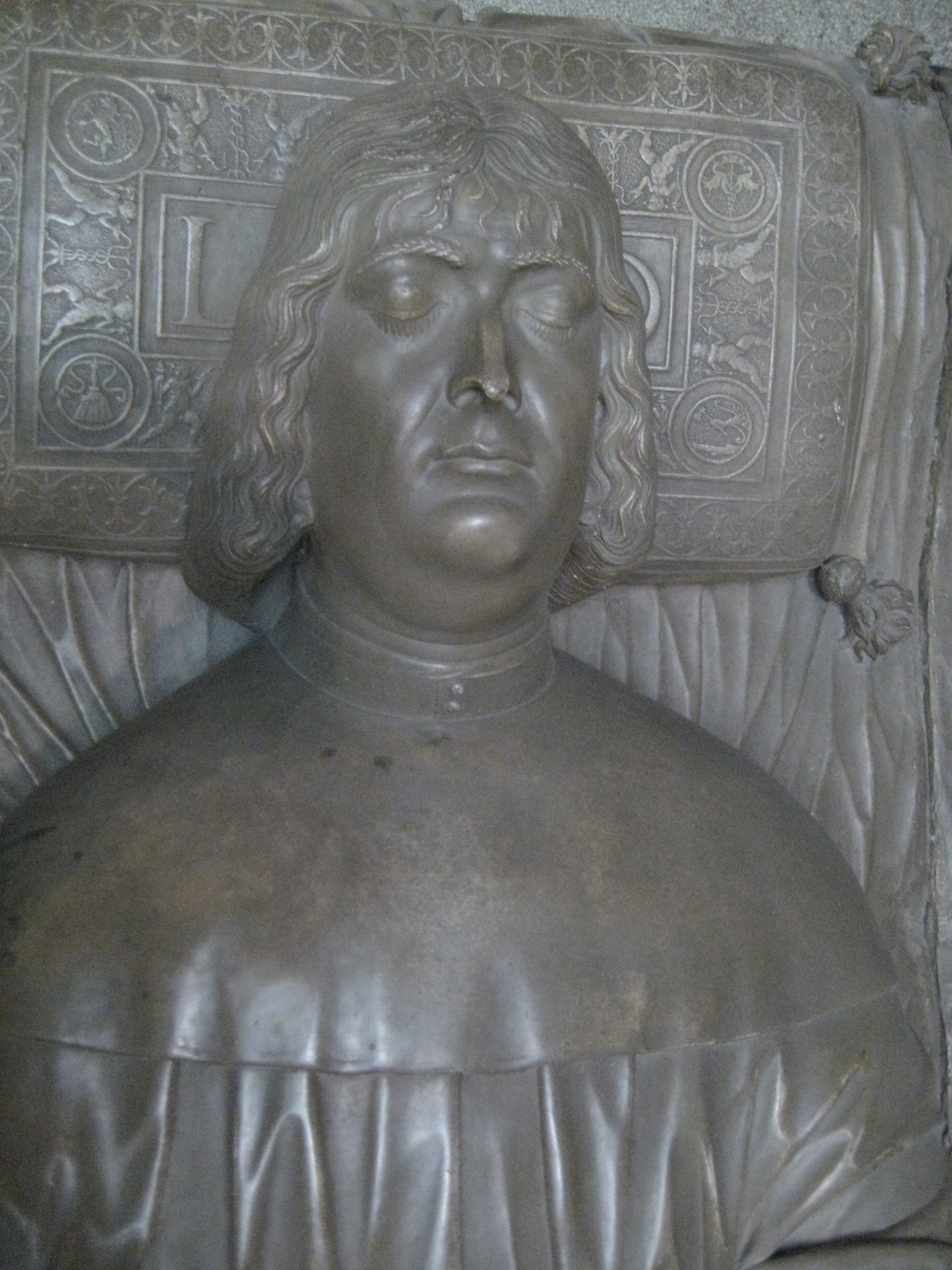
Detail of the cenotaph with the effigy of Ludovico and Beatrice

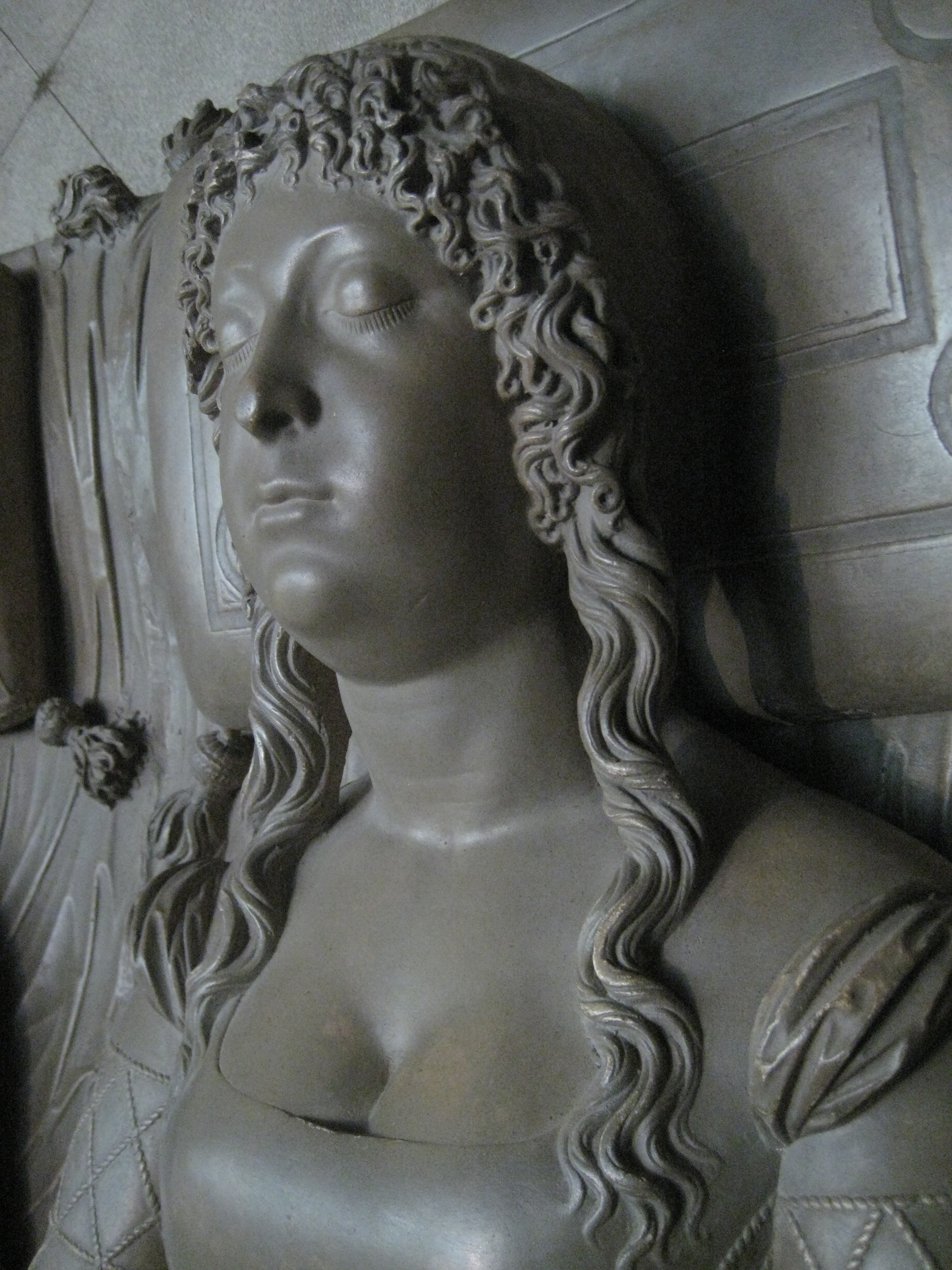

Ludovico, feeling he had betrayed his wife, went mad with grief and never recovered from her death. He had been convinced that he would die before her, and had expected her to rule Milan until their children came of age.

"And true, the death of Beatrice, the superb and intelligent Ferrarese, was a serious disaster for Ludovico il Moro. She was the soul of all his undertakings, she was the true queen of his heart and his court [...]. If the Duke of Bari [...] managed to represent on the theater of Europe a scene of much superior, as was observed, to his condition, it is largely due to this woman, vain feminally, if you will, and cruel, especially with the Duchess Isabella, but of resolute and tenacious character, of ready ingenuity, of soul open to all the seductions of luxury and to all the attractions of art. When it [...] failed [...] it was like a great storm that came to upset the soul of Ludovico. Nor did he ever recover from it; that death was the beginning of his misfortunes. Gloomy premonitions crossed his mind; it seemed to him that he had remained alone in a great stormy sea and inclined, fearfully, to asceticism. [...] the ghost of his beautiful and poor dead man was always before his spirit." (Rodolfo Renier, Gaspare Visconti)

For two weeks Ludovico locked himself in his apartments, allowed his beard to grow, and wore from then on only black clothes with a cloak torn up by a beggar. His only concern became the embellishment of the family mausoleum. The neglected Duchy fell into disrepair, and the Duke of Orléans, driven by fierce hatred of Ludovico, threatened a second campaign against Milan. On the night of Beatrice's death, Ludovico announced her death to Marquis of Mantua Francesco Gonzaga, husband of his sister-in-law Isabella, saying:

Our illustrious bride, since labour pains came to her this night at two hours, gave birth to a dead male child at five hours, and at half-past six she gave back the spirit to God, whose bitter and immature mourning we find ourselves in so much bitterness and grief. How much it is possible to feel, and so much so that the more grateful we would have been to die first and not see us lack what was the dearest thing we had in this world

— Mediolani, 3 Januarii 1497 hora undecima. Ludovicus M. Sfortia Anglus Dux Mediolani

He told the ambassador from Ferrara to relay a message to his father-in-law, Duke Ercole, asking for his forgiveness.

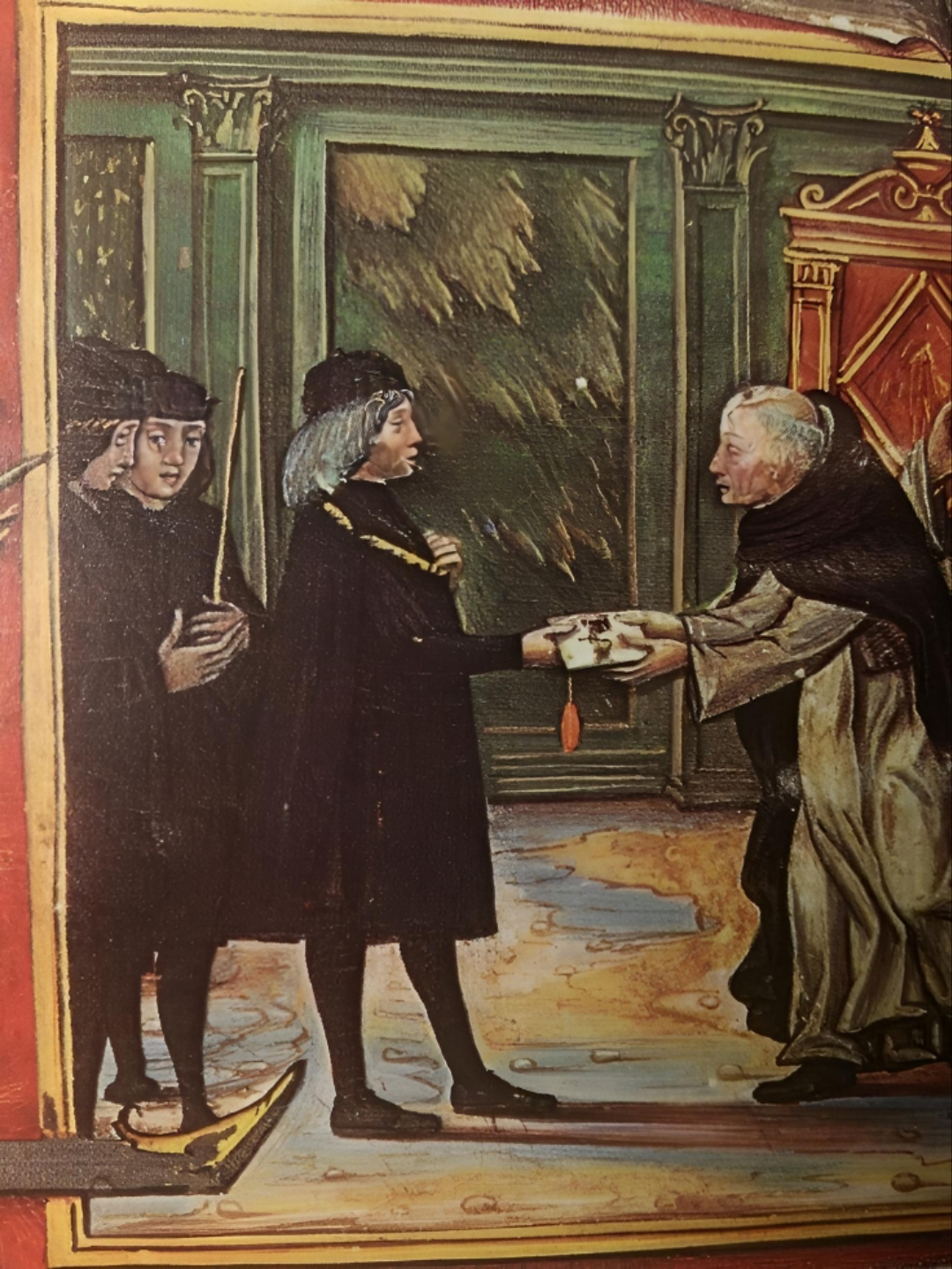
The mourning of Ludovico: on the left, miniature depicting the act of donation of Ludovico to the convent of S. Maria delle Grazie (1497);

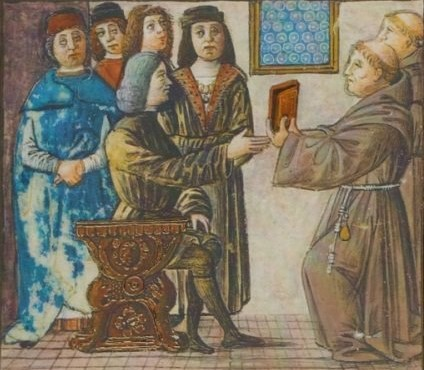
on the right, Fra' Luca Pacioli presents De Divina Proportione to the Duke (1498). The man next to Ludovico, also grieving, is perhaps his son-in-law Galeazzo Sanseverino, recognizable by what seems to be the necklace of the order of St. Michael. Both seem to have maintained mourning even after the expiration of the canonical year.

Marino Sanuto the Younger wrote in his diary of Ludovico after Beatrice's death, "Whose death the duke could not bear for the great love that she brought him, and said that he no longer wanted to take care of either his children, or the state, or worldly things, and just wanted to live [...] and since then this duke began to feel great troubles, while before he had always lived happily".

There were reports that Ludovico, during the funeral, wanted to remarry the deceased Beatrice as if she were alive, confirming their wedding vows. He begged his brother-in-law Francis not to send anyone to console with him, "not to renew the pain". He refused, with a few exceptions, to receive condolences from anyone. He imposed a rule on the ambassadors that no one was to speak of Beatrice anymore, nor to grieve or show sadness, and to only speak of matters of state.

Somewhat contradictorily, Ludovico took every opportunity to commemorate his wife himself, of whom he created almost a cult. In addition to having a coin minted with the effigy of her on the reverse, something that had never previously been done, he started to more often use Beatrice's coat of arms officially. He also had an effigy of her reproduced on a ring she wore on her finger, replacing a head of a Roman emperor. From Cristoforo Solari he commissioned a magnificent funeral monument with their two lying figures carved in marble, declaring that "he would one day rest next to his wife until the end of the world".

For a whole year, he vowed to eat standing on a tray supported by a servant, and imposed fasting at court every Tuesday, the day of his wife's death. In the castle he had a room decorated in all black, which became known as Saletta Negra, where he would go to mourn his wife in solitude. Whenever he traveled he had his quarters prepared in black. Every day he went at least twice to visit Beatrice's tomb. Ambassadors who wanted to talk to him found him more often at the tomb than in the castle. He became convinced that God was punishing him for his sins and, while this did increase his religiosity, he also began to take an interest in necromancy.

Such visible manifestations of mourning were well noted by his contemporaries, however they were later interpreted by some historians as not being entirely genuine. This was due to the fact that although at first it seemed Ludovico had ended his relationship with Lucrezia Crivelli, in 1500 she found herself pregnant again. If this were the case, however, it is not clear what purpose the outward displays of grief served, nor why it continued for so long. Even in the most critical moments, such as on the day of his escape from Milan, his last act was to visit his wife's tomb before leaving.

== Downfall and aftermath ==
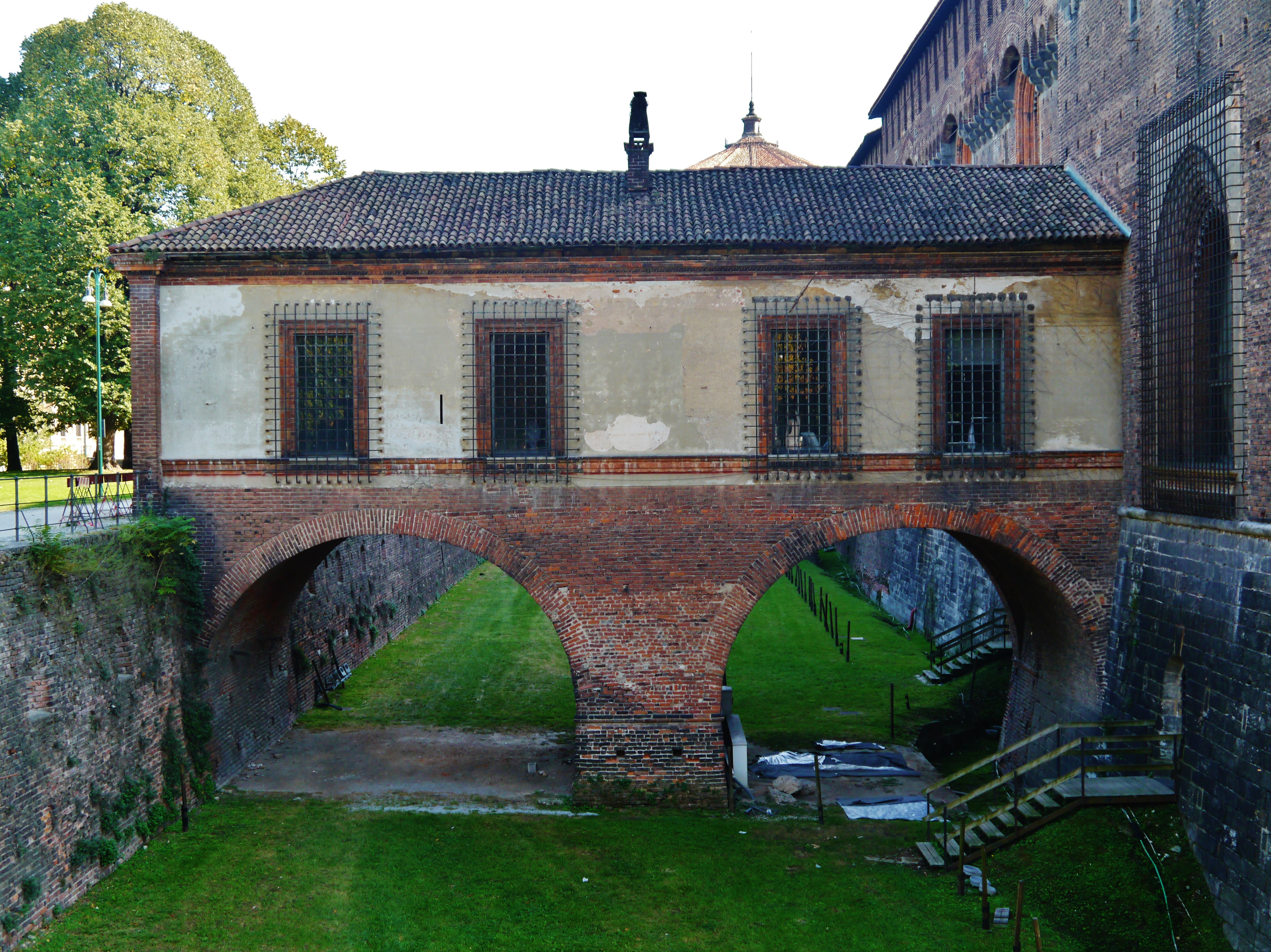
The so-called Bridge of Ludovico il Moro in the Castello Sforzesco

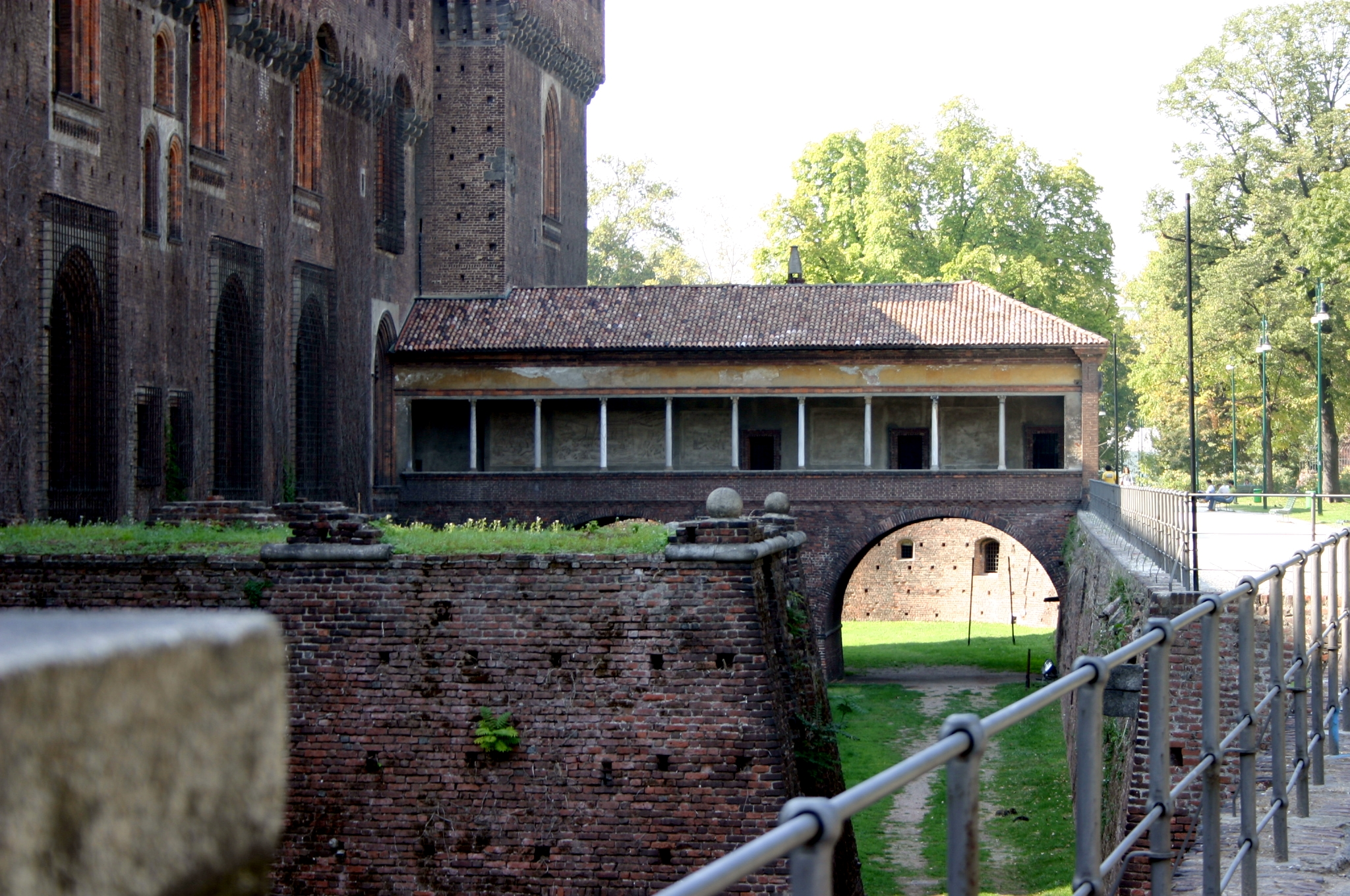
Where the Saletta Negra was located

Charles VIII died childless in 1498, with the Duke of Orleans succeeding him as Louis XII of France. As King, he decided to take revenge for the humiliation he felt he suffered because of Ludovico, and began a second expedition against the Duchy of Milan. Lacking the valuable help of his wife Beatrice, Ludovico proved unable to deal with the threat.

Lodovico, who used to draw every vigour of mind from the provident and strong advice of his wife Beatrice d'Este, having been kidnapped by her death a few years earlier, found himself isolated and devoid of daring and courage to the point that he did not see another escape against the fiery storm that threatened him if not in fleeing. And so he did.

— Raffaele Altavilla, Breve compendio di storia Lombarda

Louis XII entrusted the leadership of the army for the conquest of Milan to the famous leader Gian Giacomo Trivulzio, a personal enemy of Ludovico.

Ludovico chose to withdraw the troops he had stationed in Pisa, leaving control of the city to Venice. He subsequently reversed his alliance with Venice and helped Florence re-conquer Pisa in an effort to strengthen his alliance with them. Ludovico's hope was that Florence would help him at least diplomatically against the arrival of King Louis XII. These actions did not have the intended outcome. Venice allied themselves with Louis XII against Ludovico, and his alliance with Florence was not made stronger. Because of this, Louis XII's army was able to pass easily into Italy.

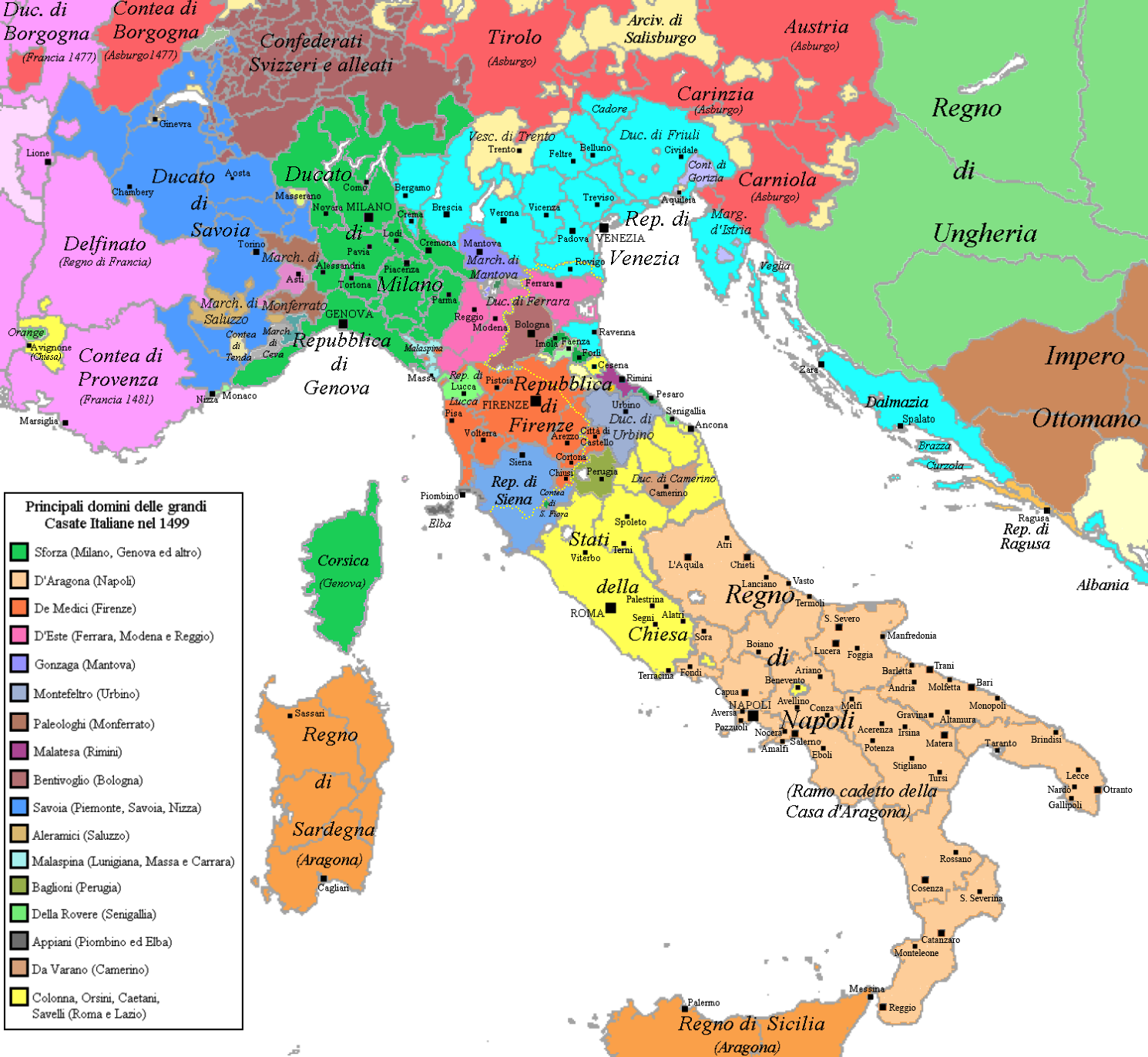
Italy around the end of the 15th century

Ludovico chose to flee, and on 1 September 1499, left Milan together with his sons and his brother Ascanio took refuge in Innsbruck with Emperor Maximilian I of Habsburg. Three of the Sanseverino brothers, Galeazzo, Fracasso and Antonio Maria came with him to Innsbruck, however Gian Francesco instead switched sides and went to the service of the King of France. Immediately after the departure of Ludovico, thanks in part to a revolt of the Milanese people oppressed by taxes, Trivulzio entered triumphantly in Milan. This event marked the start of a period of wars and foreign invasions in the Italian peninsula. Machiavelli directly blamed Ludovico and the policy he carried out, a judgment which many historians have agreed with over the centuries.

In Venice there were rumors that Ludovico, now in Germany, had gone mad. It was said that he had converted to Islam, had stabbed his son-in-law Galeazzo to death and wounded his brother Ascanio, and that he had been imprisoned. These rumors were, however, false. In Milan, the local population suffered under the occupation by the French. Upon hearing of this, Ludovico hired a Swiss mercenary army at the beginning of 1500. With the help of his brother Ascanio and the Sanseverino brothers, he was able to regain possession of Milan. Here, almost redeemed in the eyes of the Milanese, he declared to the people that he was now much delighted by the "craft of arms", and that "he liked the name of captain more than of lord".

The situation turned for the worse during the siege of Novara, when his Swiss mercenaries refused to participate in the battle. Novara had been recaptured by Ludovico and the Sanseverino brothers, but the French quickly returned and laid siege to the city. On 10 April 1500, the Swiss garrison was leaving Novara, passing a group of Swiss soldiers on the French side. French officers were posted to oversee their exit. As the disguised Ludovico passed the French, one mercenary, Hans Turmann of Uri, gave away his identity. He was apprehended by the French along with the Sanseverino brothers. A few days later, Ascanio, who had attempted to escape to Germany, was also captured.

Girolamo Priuli comments in this regard: "Trivulzio, seeing these prisoners, and above all Signor Ludovico, thought oh, what joy!!".

The French were able to return and retake Milan, which lost its independence and remained under foreign domination for 360 years. Among the spoils of war taken by the French there was the great Visconti-Sforza Library which was located in the castle of Pavia. It consisted of over 900 manuscripts, including some that belonged to Francesco Petrarca. Of the codices of the library of the Dukes of Milan, 400 are still preserved today at the Bibliothèque nationale de France, while others ended up in Italian, European or American libraries.

The French rewarded the mercenary Turmann for his betrayal of the Milanese with 200 gold crowns, corresponding to roughly five years' salary. Turmann decided to desert the army, and escaped to France, but after three years he returned home to Uri. Turmann was then immediately arrested for treason, and on the following day he was executed by decapitation.

=== Imprisonment and death ===
Ludovico was taken prisoner to France, passing through Asti, Susa, and Lyon, where he arrived on 2 May. Emperor Maximilian petitioned Louis XII to free Ludovico, however the king refused to do so, instead choosing to humiliate the former duke, refusing to even meet with him. Ludovico was still considered a special prisoner, and was allowed to go fishing and receive friends. In 1501, news spread to Venice that Ludovico was becoming unstable, that "his brain was wavering a lot". The king sent his personal physician to treat him, along with a court dwarf to cheer him up.

Ludovico was first detained at the castle of Pierre-Scize, then at Lys-Saint-Georges near Bourges. In 1504 he was moved to the castle of Loches where he was given more freedom. In 1508, Ludovico attempted to escape, but after his failure he was further deprived of amenities including his books. He spent the rest of his life in the castle's dungeon, where he died on 27 May 1508.

The Swiss later restored the Duchy of Milan to Ludovico's son, Maximilian Sforza. His other son, Francesco II, also held the duchy for a short period. Francesco II died in 1535, sparking the Italian War of 1536–1538, as a result of which Milan passed to the Spanish Empire.

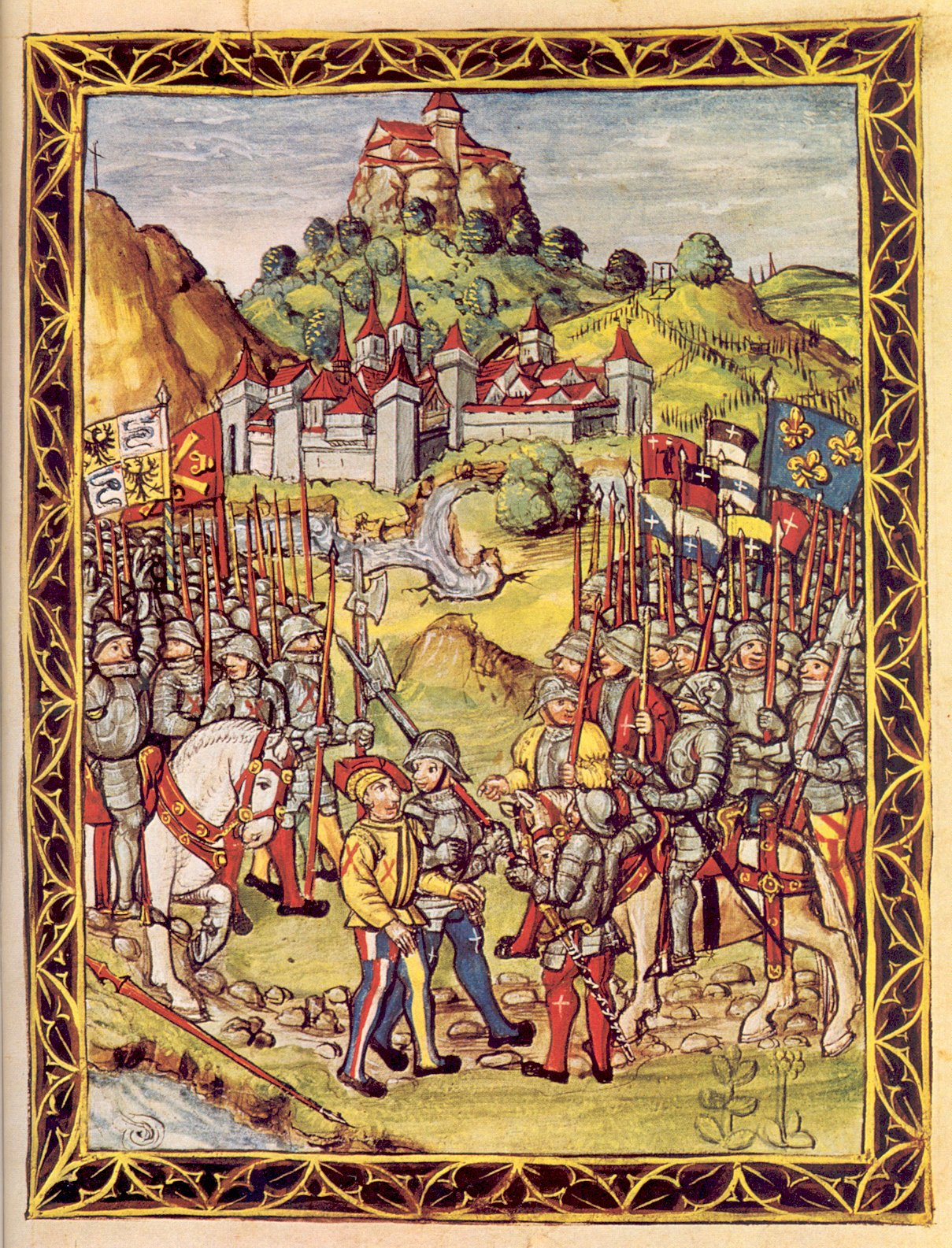
Sforza is handed over to the French. Illustration from the Lucerne Chronicle (1513).

The memory of Ludovico was clouded for centuries by Machiavelli's accusation that he 'invited' Charles VIII to invade Italy, paving the way for subsequent foreign domination. The charge was perpetuated by later historians who espoused the idea of national independence. More recent historians, however, placing the figure of Ludovico in its Renaissance context, have reevaluated his merits as a ruler and given a more equitable assessment of his achievement.

== Appearance and personality ==
=== Ludovico "the tyrant" ===
While a good duke in times of peace, Ludovico faltered during times of war. Ludovico is described as a man with a mild, conciliatory character, who detested all forms of violence and cruelty. He made efforts to keep away from battlefields, and refrained from inflicting harsh punishments on the guilty.

In public as well as private life, the figure of Lodovico appears undoubtedly nice, even if he cannot be called a great figure. Good-natured, a lover of peace, distant as far as possible from that dangerous boldness that had made his duchy strong, thanks to the initiative of some of his ancestors, and his family powerful and feared, for twenty years he devoted almost exclusively his activity in favour of the citizens and his relations. Elegant, good looking (the poets praised his handsomeness), cultured, a good writer in the vernacular and in Latin, witty, a patron of literature [...] a pleasing orator, a lover of happy conversations and of music, certainly more than he was of painting, [...]; passionate farmer and introducer in our country of new crops and agricultural industries, modern in ideas in wanting provident and liberal laws – his rebukes prove it – Lodovico il Moro [...] is, in our view, the most attractive, the most complete figure of a gentleman of the Italian Renaissance.

— Francesco Malaguzzi Valeri, La corte di Ludovico il Moro etc.

Many historians, therefore, believe he does not deserve the title of "tyrant" that is sometimes attributed to him, which if anything belongs to his brother Galeazzo Maria Sforza. As the duke before Ludovico, Galeazzo used to torment his subjects and even his friends with unspeakable torture and cruelty. Galeazzo was known to take the wives of others for his own pleasure, to such an extent that is widely considered the motivation for his alleged assassination in 1476.

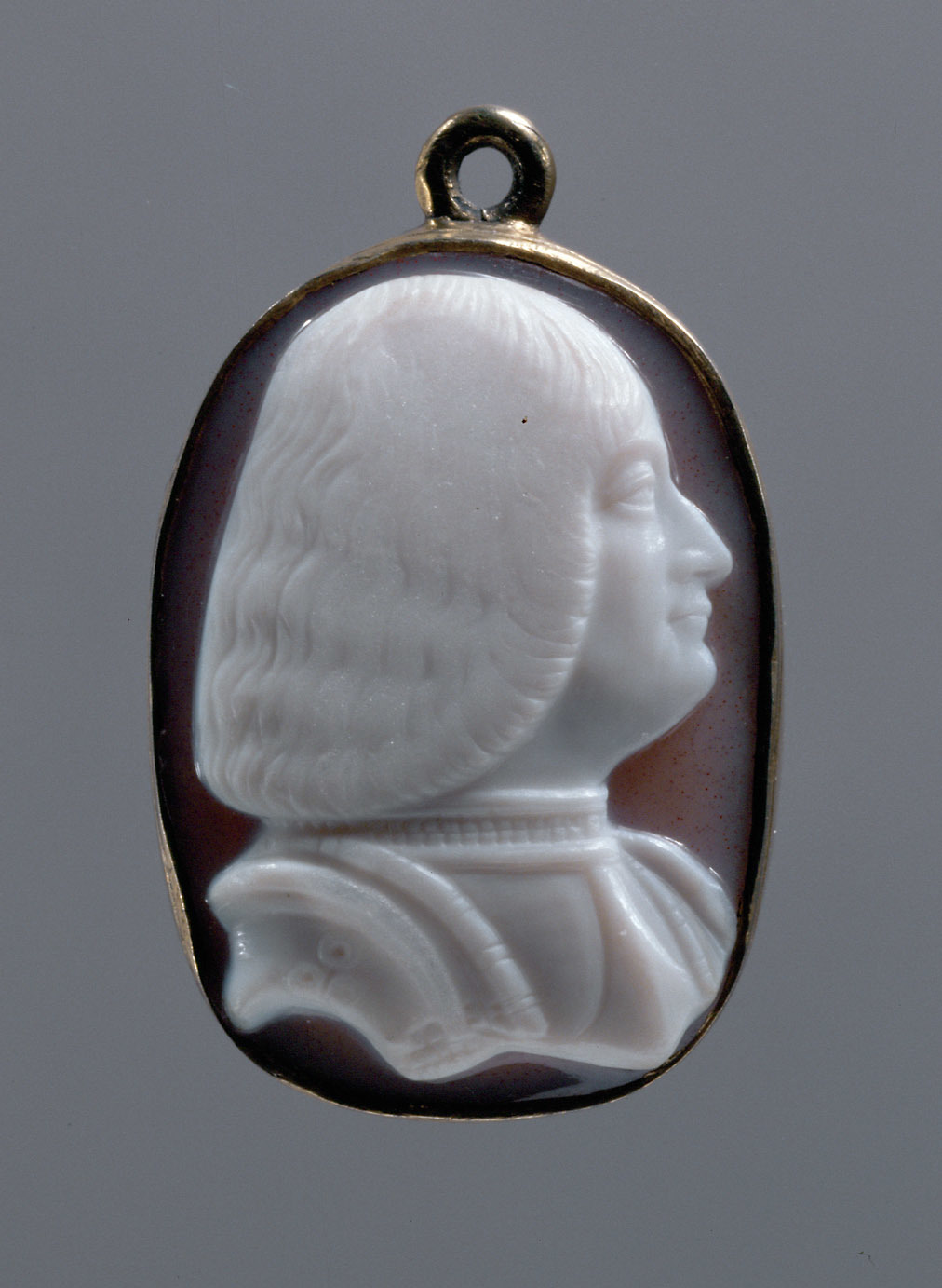
Cameo of Ludovico, Domenico de' Cameos, c. 1495

Ludovico perhaps took this example as a warning, and was rarely roused to anger. It was said that even in the last years of his life while imprisoned by King Louis XII, deprived of his state, his title, his wealth, and even his own children, Ludovico wrote papers on "the things of Italy" for Louis XII himself. In this, he explained to the King what was the best way to govern Lombardy, encouraged him to flatter the Florentines, not to antagonize the Pope, and never to trust the Venetians.

=== Physical appearance ===
Ludovico was quite tall for the time, between 1.8 metres (5 ft 11 in) and 1.9 metres (6 ft 3 in) in height, however he was by no means physically fit. He appreciated good food and above all he loved the mullets that his father-in-law Ercole sometimes sent him. Aliprando Caprioli says: "he was not well disposed of body, but beautiful of face, and of generous presence".

Over the years Ludovico gained more and more weight until the death of his wife when he began to lose weight due to his continuous fasting. After being captured he became "fatter than ever", as described by ambassador Domenico Trevisan, having become accustomed to imprisonment and being well-fed by King Louis XII.

Due to his size, he did not wear the tight-fitting farsetti typical of young men and condottieri, but rather baggy clothes that fell just above the knee. He had broad shoulders and highlighted them with solid gold chains, as can be seen in the so-called Sforza Altarpiece. From an early age, he had dark eyes, dark hair, and a dark complexion, and it was from these dark features where his nickname "The Moor" was derived. The Ferrarese chronicler Girolamo Ferrarini, who met him twenty-five years old in 1477, describes him as being "of noble and beautiful appearance, although he is brown in the face". In 1492, the Venetian ambassadors called him a "beautiful man". In his later years he suffered from several diseases, such as gout and asthma.

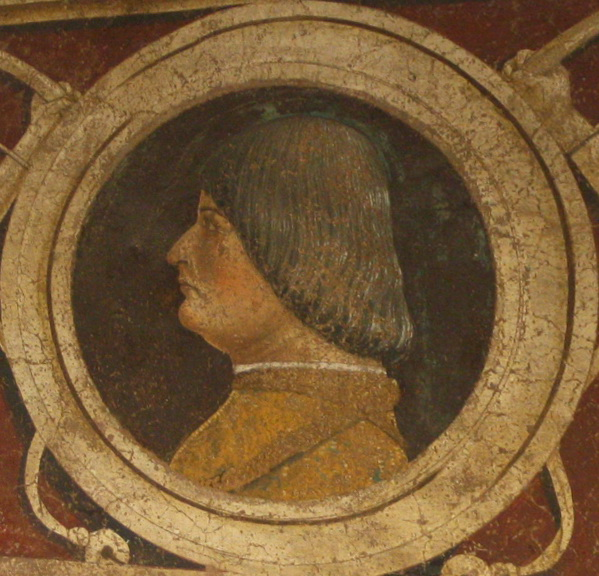
Ludovico il Moro. Round from the Renaissance frieze torn from the Visconti castle of Invorio Inferiore. Landscape Museum in Verbania-Pallanza.

=== Personality ===
Ludovico was known to be prodigal with his friends, very liberal, condescending, and thoughtful. He was not an energetic man unless spurred to action. Later in life, perhaps as a result of a stroke, he became increasingly contradictory and unstable. Camillo Porzio said of Ludovico:

Ludovico Sforza, who wanted to be superhuman in the councils, and in his work appeared little more than a female [...]

— Camillo Porzio, La congiura de' baroni del Regno di Napoli etc.

Paolo Giovio, who instead has very harsh words for Beatrice, describes him as follows:

Very human and very easy to give audience and his soul is never overcome by anger. Moderately and with great patience he gave reason, and with singular liberality, he favoured illustrious geniuses either in letters or in the noble arts. And finally, when famine or plague came, he took great care of provisions and health care; removed the rubbings, and straightened the clumsy buildings of the city, he brought so much splendour and wealth to Lombardy, that by all he was called builder of golden peace, public security and grace.

— Paolo Giovio, Istoria del suo tempo

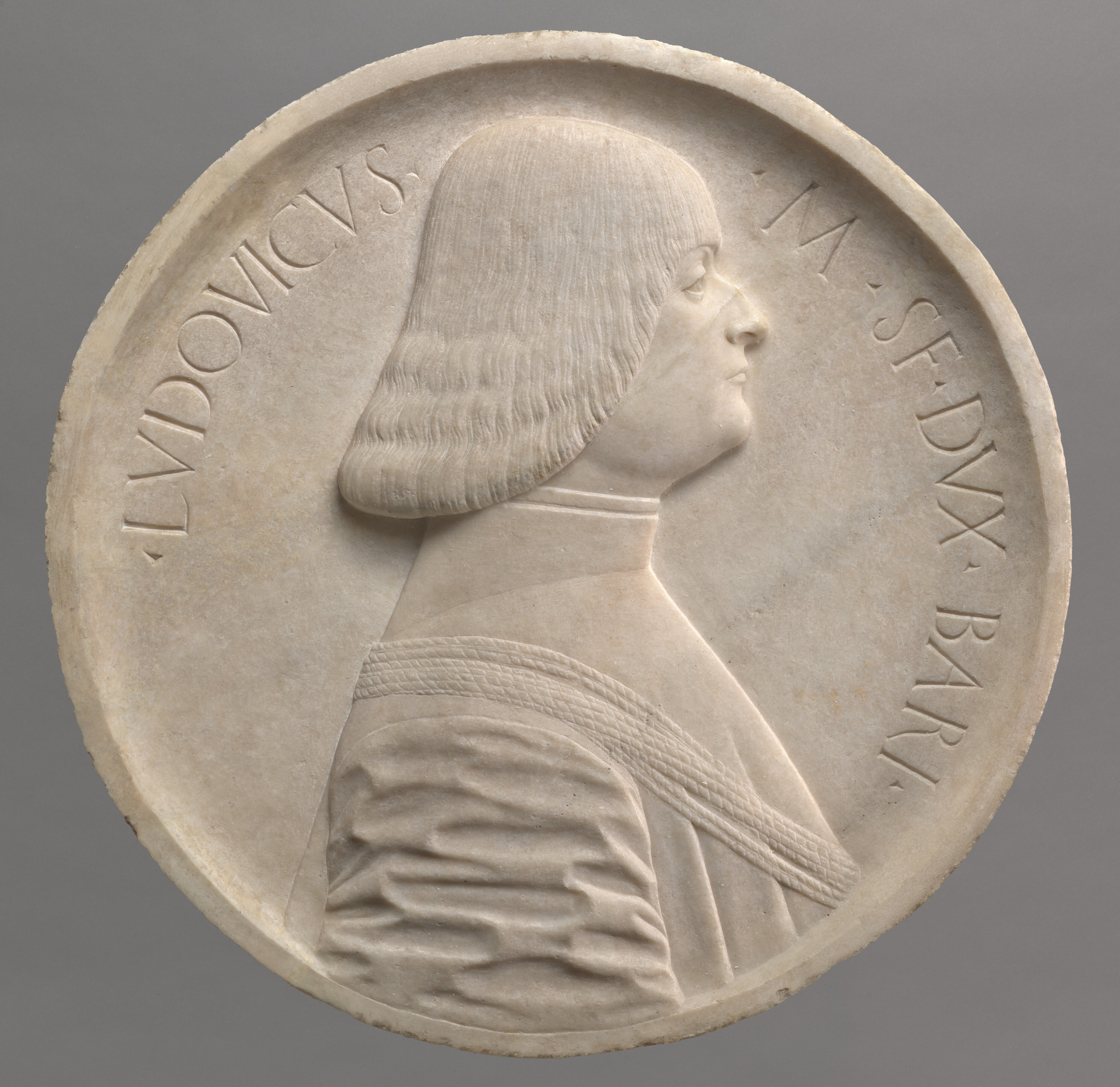
Ludovico Duke of Bari, early 90s. Marble bas-relief by Benedetto Briosco.

Ludovico was sometimes prideful, as in 1496 when he boasted that Pope Alexander was his chaplain, Emperor Maximilian his general, Venice his chamberlain, and the King of France his courier who had to come and go to Italy at his will. Guicciardini, who referred to Ludovico as the "arbiter of Italy", also called him "a very vigilant prince of very acute ingenuity".

Giacomo Trotti called him a man who "does not love a person except out of fear or need" and said "he is mendacious, he is vindictive, very greedy, without shame, greedy for other people's things ... in superlative pusillanimous, not to be trusted ... he is ambitious and never says good about anyone." He adds that he was the type of person who first says one thing then does another, who had no love for anyone and no one loved him, and who was convinced that he could underestimate the other powerful of Italy. For this, Trotti claimed that he had no true friends.

The chronicler Andrea Prato, who harshly reproaches him for having preferred Galeazzo Sanseverino to Gian Giacomo Trivulzio, paints a merciless picture, saying that he was indeed of rare and prudent intellect, but fearful to such an extent that he seemed to abhor not only battles but even to hear about atrocious and cruel things. Prato believed this was why he was not loved by soldiers, who want a spirited gentleman to stand by their side and expose himself to danger with them.

In his wife, he found a woman of strong character and a lover of war who was able to make up for her husband's failings. Beatrice was his most faithful and valid collaborator, so much so that her death marked his downfall. Ludovico trusted Beatrice blindly, granted her great freedom, and entrusted her with important tasks, making her always a participant in the councils and negotiations of war. As a husband he was, therefore, well thought of, had not been for the continuous affairs. Some historians claimed that he beat his wife, but the confusion seems to arise from a letter from 1492, in which it is written that the Duke of Milan had "beaten" his wife. The Duke of Milan at that time was Gian Galeazzo, who was known to mistreat his wife Isabella. Ludovico was never known to make such a gesture towards that woman who he "loved more than himself".

As a father, he was described as attentive to his family and maintained a close relationship with his daughter, Bianca Giovanna. Contemporary accounts indicate that her death had a significant emotional impact on him.

==== Love for the land ====
One of Ludovico's greatest passions, more than women, more than food, and more than the government, was agriculture. Ludovico liked to remember that his grandfather, Muzio Attendolo, was born a farmer before becoming a leader. Ludovico was an expert at growing vines and mulberries, as well as the famous moròn, which fed the silkworms that made the Milanese industry famous. He established his own farm near Vigevano, the so-called Sforzesca, with the adjacent field the Pecorara where various species of cattle, sheep and other animals were bred. Ludovico loved his farm and he often visited with his wife Beatrice, who like him was a lover of nature. It was no coincidence that he employed Leonardo da Vinci almost more as an engineer than as an artist, using his knowledge to build a series of aqueducts for irrigating the lands that were naturally arid. In the end he decided, by the official act of 28 January 1494, to donate the Sforzesca, along with many other lands, to his beloved Beatrice.

Ludovico also invested in horse and cattle breeding, as well as the metal industry. Some 20,000 workers were employed in the silk industry. He sponsored extensive work in civil and military engineering, such as canals and fortifications, continued work on the Cathedral of Milan and the Certosa of Pavia, and had the streets of Milan enlarged and adorned with gardens. The University of Pavia flourished under him. There were some protests at the heavy taxation necessary to support these ventures, and a few riots resulted.

==== Astrology ====
Ludovico was said to have been obsessed with astrology, so much so that the courtiers of Ferrara noticed that in Milan nothing was done unless Ambrose of Rosate, astrologer and personal doctor of Ludovico, had first consulted the stars.

==== Culture ====
Ludovico was a cultured man. He knew Latin and French and would often listen to the daily reading and commentary of the Divine Comedy that the humanist Antonio Grifo kept at the behest of the Duchess Beatrice. After her death and his capture, Ludovico asked to be able to keep a book of Dante's work. He read this continuously during his captivity, even going as far as to translate it into French on the walls of his cell.

=== Ludovico "the seducer" ===
Ludovio was endowed with great charm and charisma, and became known as a seducer in his younger years. His contemporary, historian Francesco Guicciardini, claimed (probably falsely) that Ludovico had fallen in love with his niece Isabella of Aragon, which Guicciardini believed led him to make a deal with his nephew so that he did not consummate their marriage. Guicciardini boasted, in 1498, that it was out of jealousy of his wife that the Marquis Francesco Gonzaga played the "double game" between him and the Lordship of Venice, insinuating a relationship between Ludovico and his sister-in-law Isabella d'Este. These rumors spread to Venice and angered both the Marquis and his father-in-law Ercole, who were quick to deny them. While Isabella certainly always had a soft spot for Ludovico and envied her sister Beatrice for her fortunate marriage, wealth, and children, there is no proof that she was actually his mistress.

==== Lovers ====
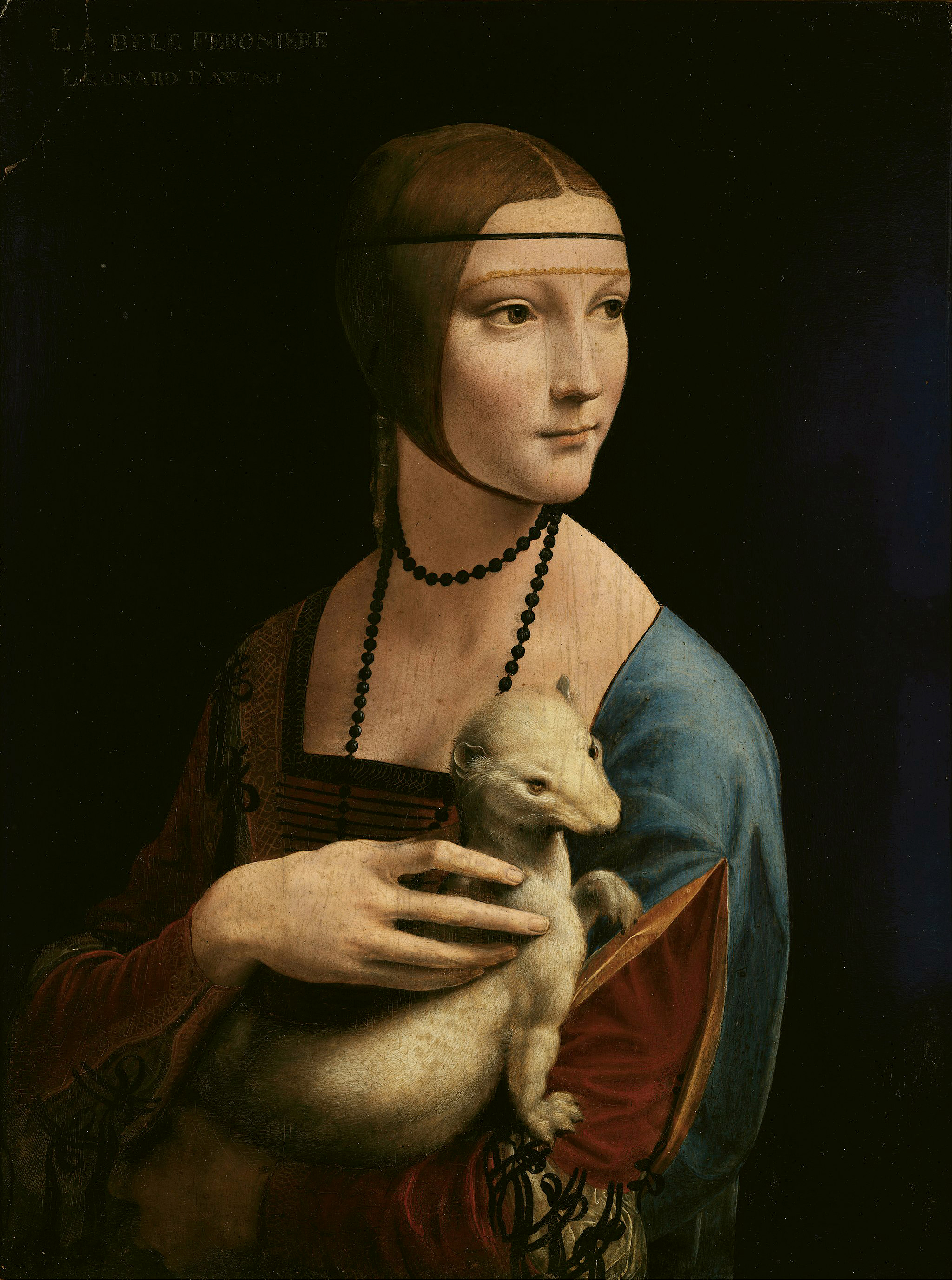
Cecilia Gallerani as The Lady with an Ermine, painted by Leonardo da Vinci

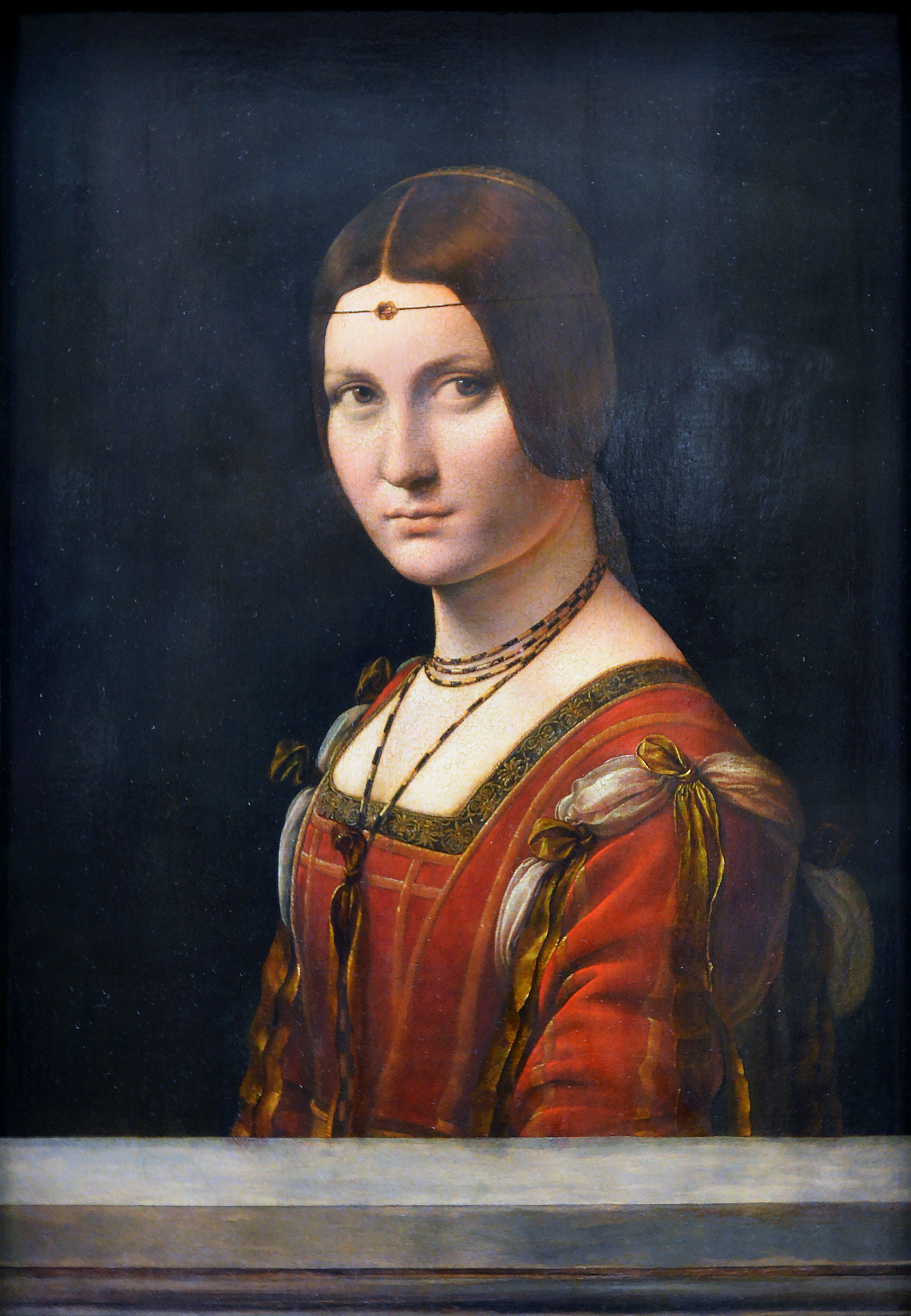
La belle ferronnière by Leonardo da Vinci is believed either Lucrezia Crivelli or Beatrice d'Este

Despite his great love for his wife, Ludovico had lovers both before and during their marriage, like many other gentlemen of the time. The first two of which there are records are Romana and Bernardina de' Corradis, probably both of low social status. In July 1485, Ludovico spoke in a letter "of the pleasure that I already took a few days ago with a young Milanese, notable by blood, very honest and beautiful as much as I could have desired". Some historians identify this woman as Isabella Gallerani, while others believe it is probably his previously known lover Cecilia Gallerani, both sisters of Galeazzo Gallerani. Cecilia officially appeared at court in the summer of 1489, when the ambassador Giacomo Trotti attributed the cause of a certain mood of Ludovico to "too much coitus with one of his girls whom he took with him, very beautiful, several days ago, who goes after him everywhere". Cecilia remained at court until early in 1491, when she was ousted by the new Duchess Beatrice. For some time after this, there were no more mention of lovers.

Between February and March 1495, coinciding with the birth of his second child, Ludovico had an affair with Isabella Trotti da Casate, a friend of Isabella d'Este. A letter addressed from da Casate to Ludovico at the time suggests that Ludovico did now want her to call herself his lover, perhaps out of respect for his wife Beatrice who read all his correspondences. Shortly afterwards he began his well-known relationship with Lucrezia Crivelli, herself already married, which caused a crisis in his marriage. It was rumoured at the time that Ludovico had not slept with Beatrice in months, instead investing his efforts in his affair with Lucrezia Despite the strain on their marriage, Beatrice continued to love Ludovico, who in turn still showed outward affection for her. The relationship with Lucrezia officially lasted until the defeat of Ludovico, despite his phase of rigorous asceticism following the death of his wife. Upon his capture, Lucrezia sought refuge with the marquises of Mantua, along with the son they had had together and the enormous wealth she had accumulated.

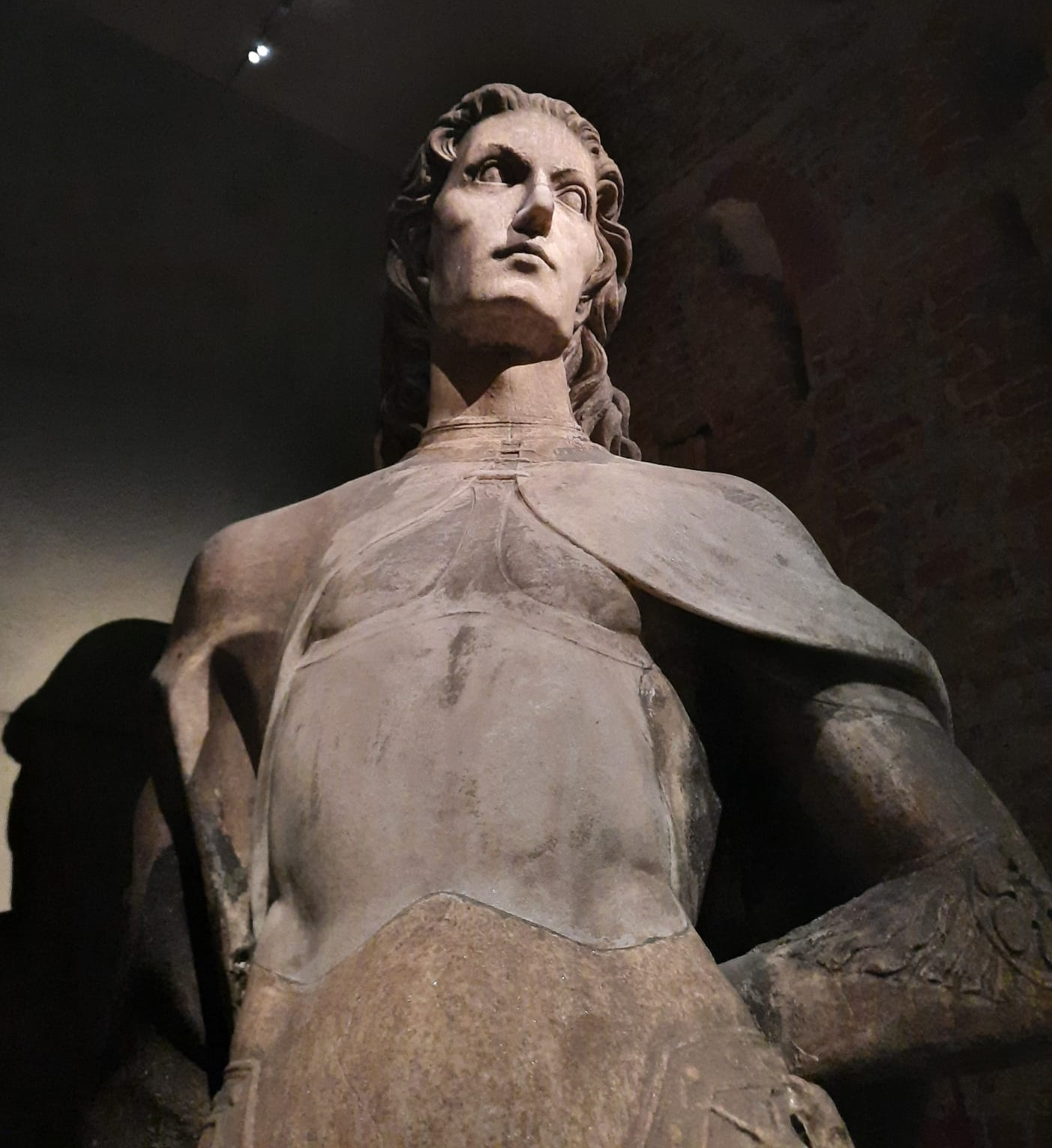
Possible portrait of Galeazzo Sanseverino in the guise of San Vittore il Moro. Statue in the collection of the Great Museum of the Duomo of Milan, late fifteenth century.

It is speculated that Ludovico had another lover, Graziosa Maggi, however, the exact nature of their relationship is uncertain. Graziosa was a lady of Beatrice's court, called "Graziosa Pia" because she was the wife of Ludovico Pio di Carpi, to whom Ludovico made a generous dowry. In August 1498, he addressed a letter to her in which he said, "We will remind you of this alone: that you are loved by us only, thus deserving your virtues and customs." Another potential affair was with Ippolita Fioramonte, another young lady in Beatrice's court. This affair is only speculative, with the main evidence being that after the death of the duchess, Ludovico became very protective of Ippolita, bestowing on her a large dowry. During his life, some also suspected an affair between Ludovico and Chiara Gonzaga, sister of Marquis Francesco, however, Ludovico was quick to quell these rumours, and it is today believed they were merely friends.

Of the many rumours surrounding Ludovico's affairs, one of the most notable involves Galeazzo Sanseverino. Ludovico was close friends with Sanseverino, continuously bestowing him with honours and privileges, to the point of marrying him to his daughter and appointing him regent together with his wife Beatrice. Galeazzo was a confidant for all of Ludovico's secrets and acquired so much power in Milan that Ambassador Trotti wrote to the Duke of Ferrara: "It seems to me that this Messer Galeazzo is Duke of Milan because he can do what he wants and has whatever he asks and desires." He served his father-in-law faithfully and, although he was not as skilled in war as his brother Fracasso, he was appointed as captain-general of the Sforza army from 1488 until Ludovico's capture.

While some, such as Philippe de Comines, ascribed this behavior to nothing more than a close filial relationship, others believed their relationship to be more sexual in nature. Francesco Gonzaga openly accused Galeazzo of prostituting himself to Ludovico, and others believed that the two were engaged in sodomy.

If he was a lord of great genius and valiant man, and so lacked the cruelty and many vices that tyrants usually have, and could for many considerations be called a virtuous man, these virtues too were obscured and covered by many vices; because he was dishonest in the sin of sodomy and, as many said, still as an old man no less patient than an agent; he was stingy, varied, changeable and of little spirit; but that because he found less compassion was an infinite ambition, which, to be the arbiter of Italy, forced him to let King Charles pass and fill Italy with barbarians.

— Francesco Guicciardini, Storia fiorentina.

The practice of sodomy, according to the ancient Greek custom, was widespread at that time, and many other lords were known to engage in it.

== Origin of the nickname "Moro" ==
Ludovico earned the nickname "Moro", the Moor, as a child. Crowds would often call him this he paraded through the cities of the Duchy. The Moors were Africans and Saracens, and so the most likely reason for this nickname was because of Ludovico's bronze complexion, raven hair and black eyes, as visible from many of his portraits and as confirmed by the contemporary chronicler Gian Andrea Prato:

It was this Signor Ludovico Sforza with the negligence of colour nicknamed Moro; so appealed initially by his father Francesco and his mother Bianca, Duchi de Milano, in the early years, while with him still a child, mildly reasoning they joked.

— Giovanni Andrea Prato, Cronaca milanese

== Ludovico in art ==
Ludovico and his court are frequent subjects in the art of the nineteenth century. During the romantic period, events such as the deep sorrow for the death of his wife Beatrice, the alleged poisoning of Duke Gian Galeazzo, and the presence of artists of the calibre of Leonardo da Vinci, inspired painters such as Giambattista Gigola (1816–1820), Giuseppe Diotti (1823), Francesco Gonin (1845), Francesco Podesti (1846), Cherubino Cornienti (1840 and 1858), Eleanor Fortescue-Brickdale (1920).

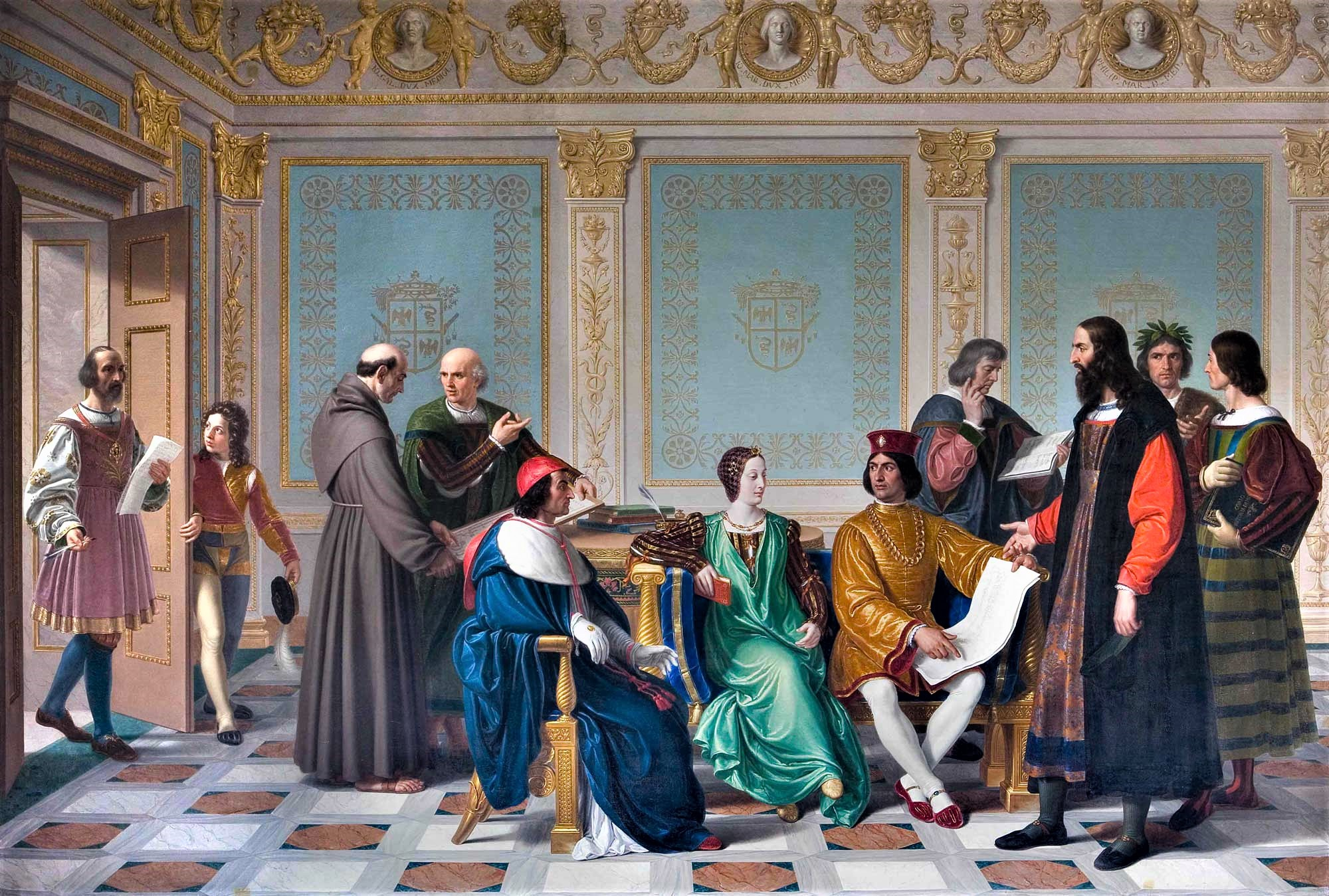
The court of Ludovico il Moro, Giuseppe Diotti (1823). Starting from the left: a page opens the door to the secretary Bartolomeo Calco. At the centre of the scene are seated Cardinal Ascanio, Duchess Beatrice and Duke Ludovico, to whom Leonardo da Vinci is showing the project for the fresco of the Last Supper. Around them are recognizable some other great personalities of the court: on the left Bramante speaks with the mathematician Fra' Luca Pacioli; on the right the musician Franchino Gaffurio, who reads a score, the poet Bernardo Bellincioni, crowned with laurel, and the historian Bernardino Corio, with his Historia di Milano under his arm.

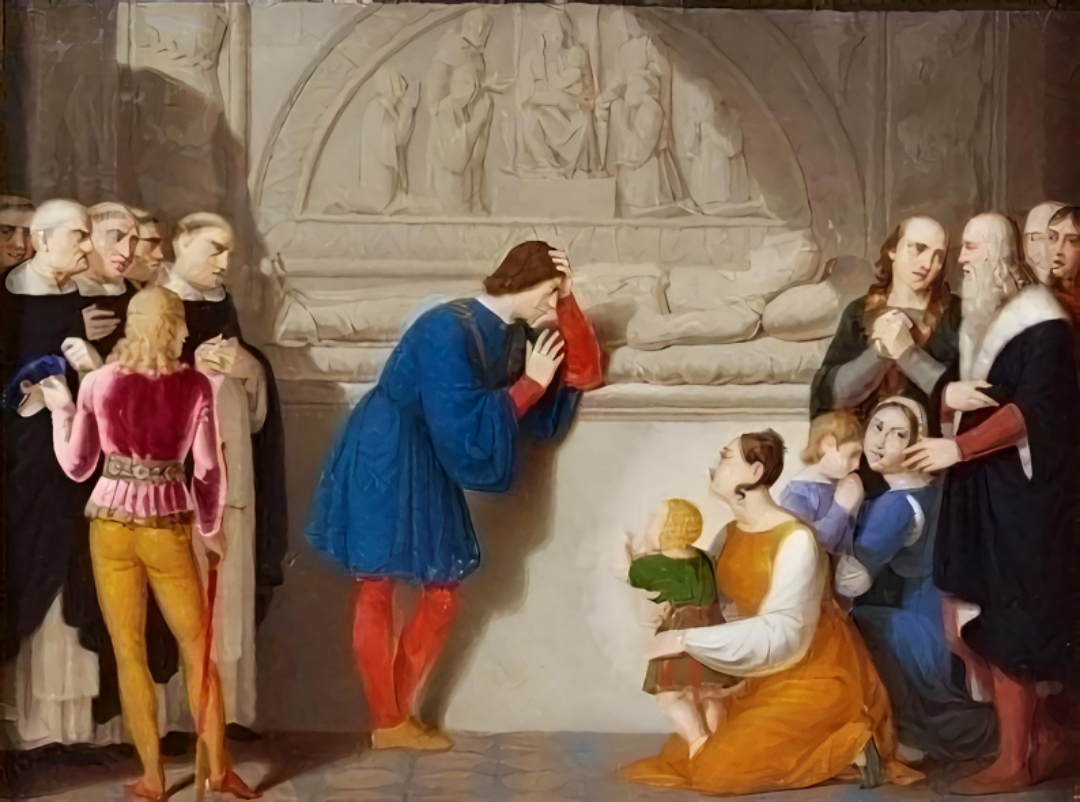
Ludovico weeps over the tomb of his wife Beatrice, Giovanni Battista Gigola, c. 1815, Pinacoteca Ambrosiana. The friars of S. Maria delle Grazie assist on the left, and on the right the two orphans Ercole Massimiliano and Francesco with their respective nurses, as well as Bramante and Leonardo.

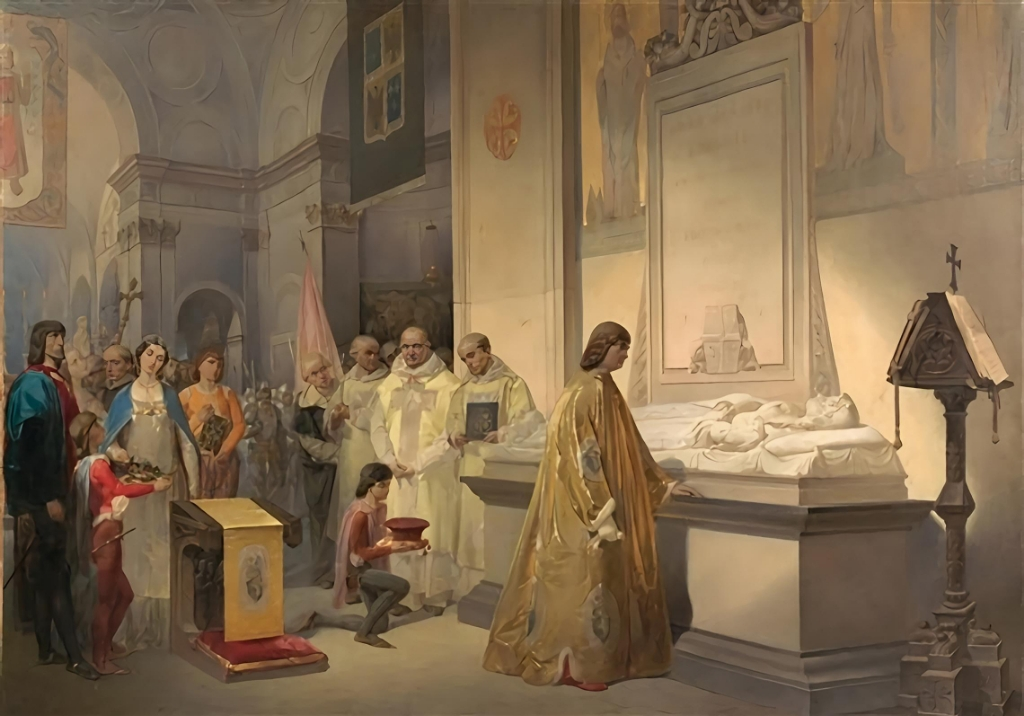
Duke Ludovico visited the tomb of his wife in the church of Santa Maria delle Grazie, Alessandro Reati, between 1850 and 1873.

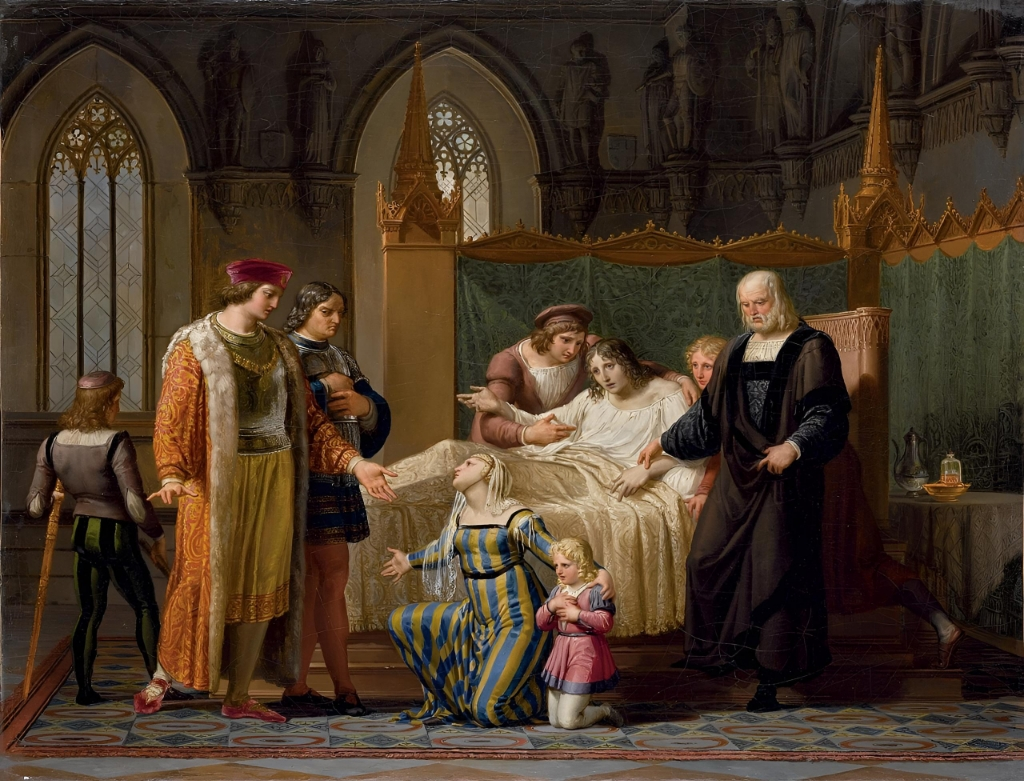
The meeting of Charles VIII and Gian Galeazzo Sforza in Pavia in 1494, Pelagio Palagi. In front of her dying husband's bed, Duchess Isabella of Aragon begs the sovereign Charles VIII on his knees not to want to continue the war against Alfonso her father and entrusts him with her son Francesco. Next to the king, with a shady face, stands Duke Ludovico, presumed responsible for the poisoning.

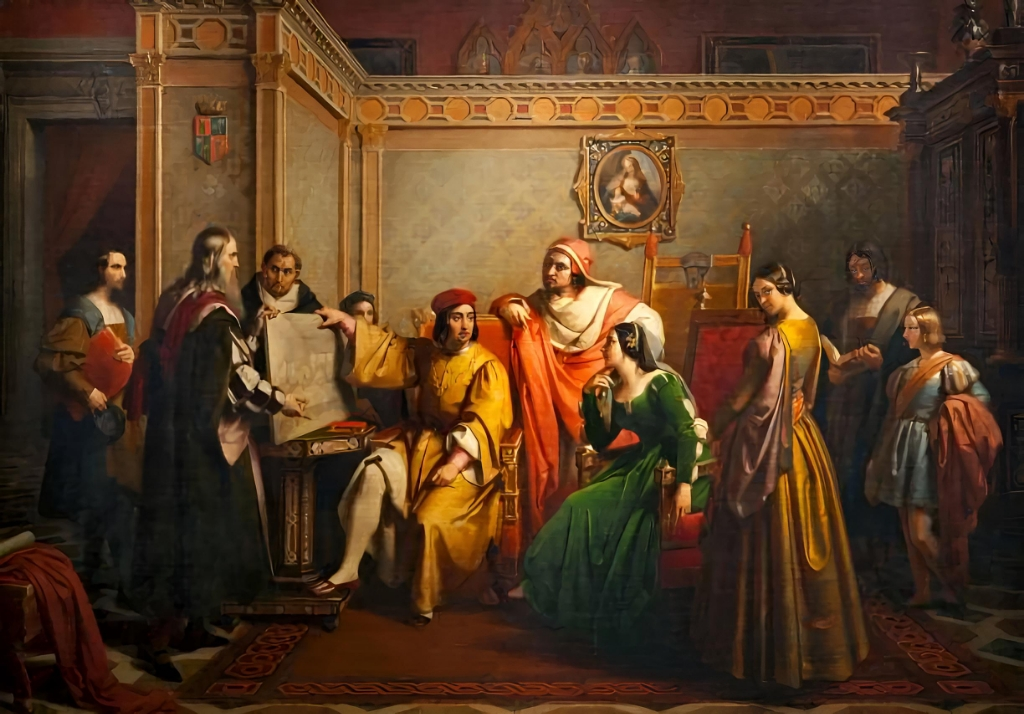
Leonardo presents the sketch of the Last Supper to the Duke of Milan Ludovico il Moro, Francesco Podesti, 1846. At the centre of the scene are, as elsewhere, the Duke with Duchess Beatrice and Cardinal Ascanio.

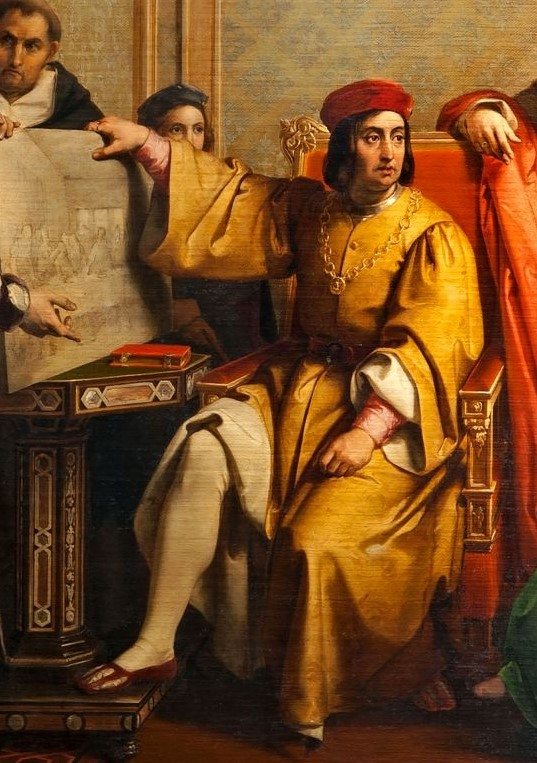
Detail of Duke Ludovico

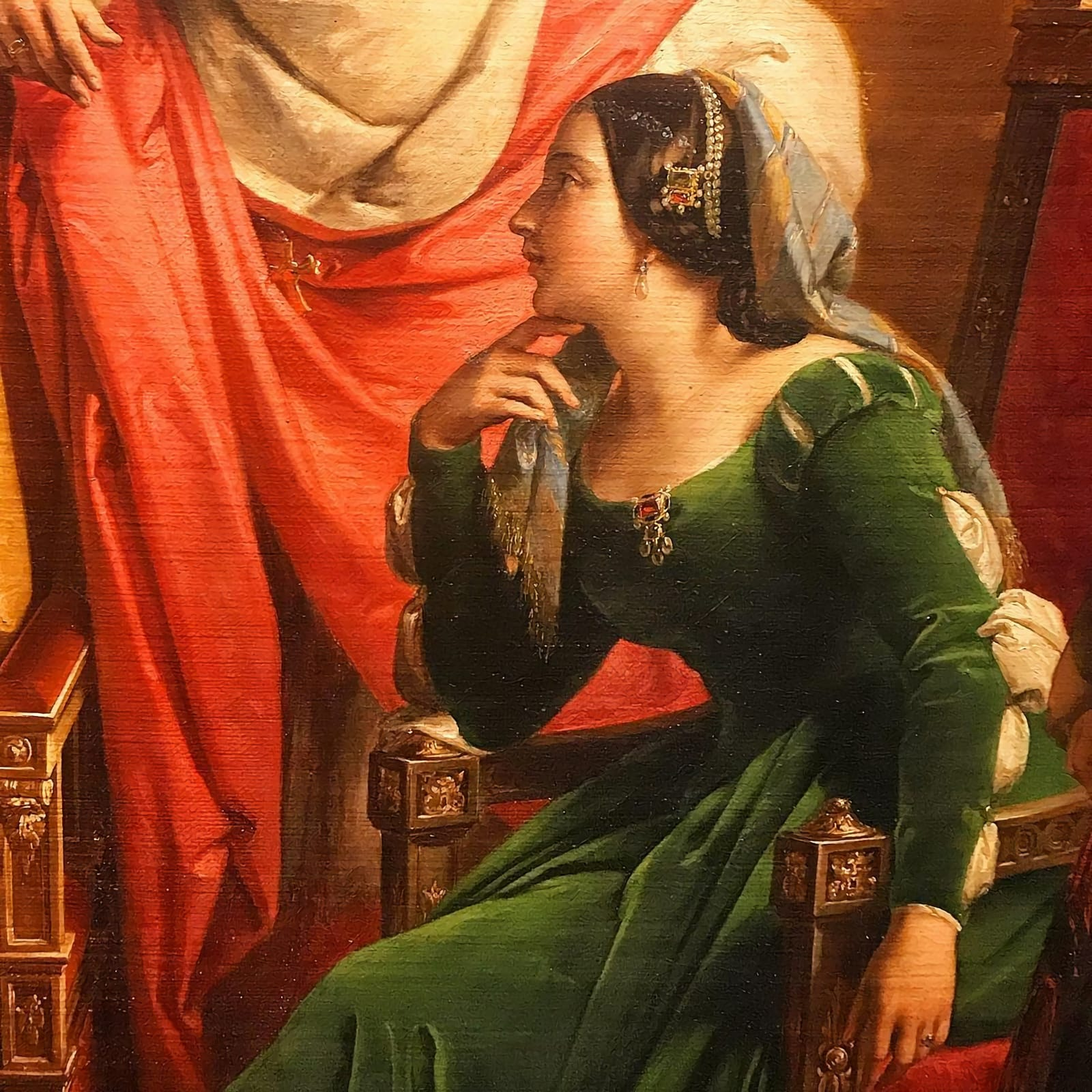
Detail of Duchess Beatrice

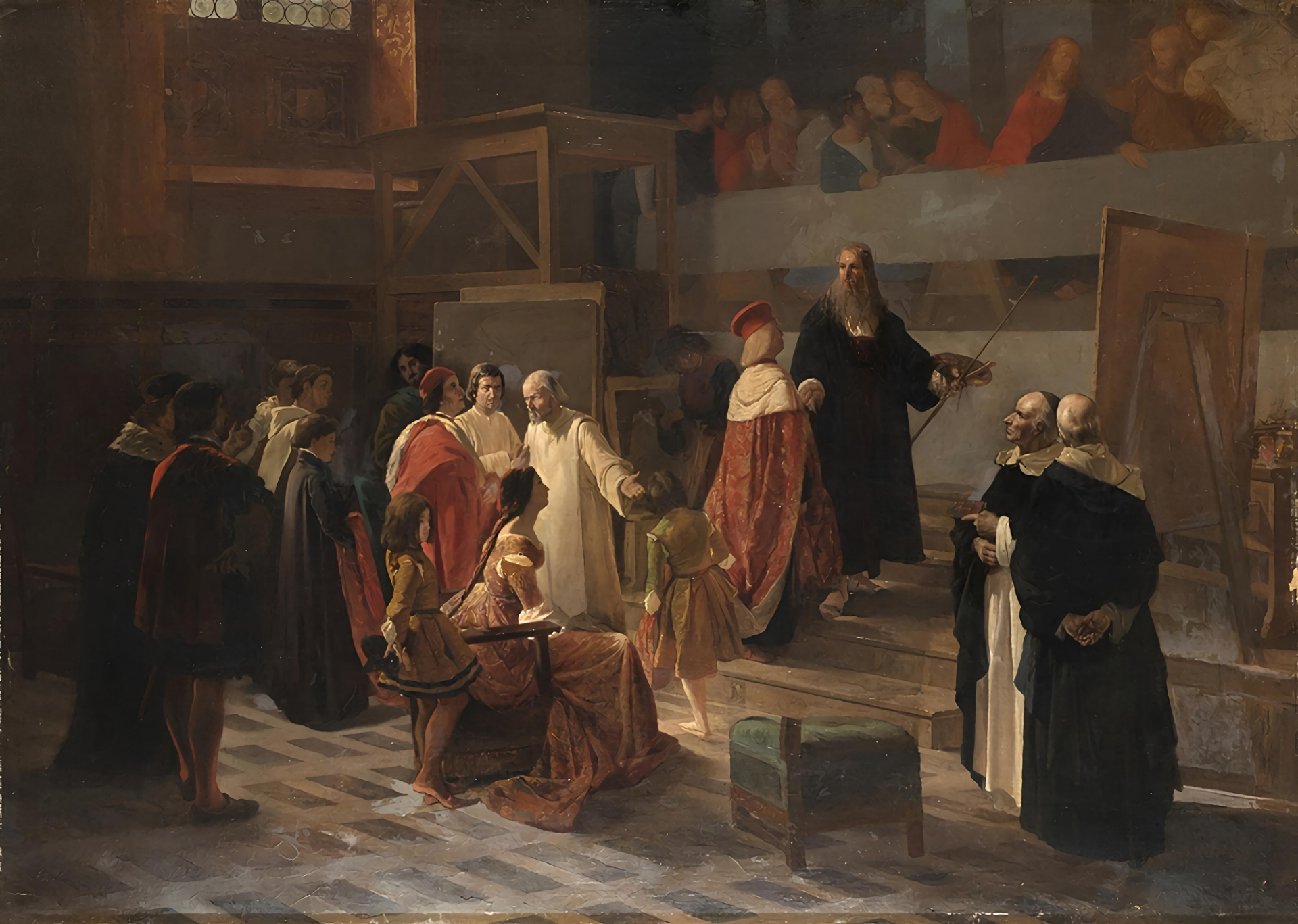
Ludovico il Moro visiting Leonardo da Vinci in the Refectory of Santa Maria delle Grazie, mid-nineteenth century, Cherubino Cornienti. Behind the blond Moro also the Duchess Beatrice and Cardinal Ascanio admire the work absorbed.

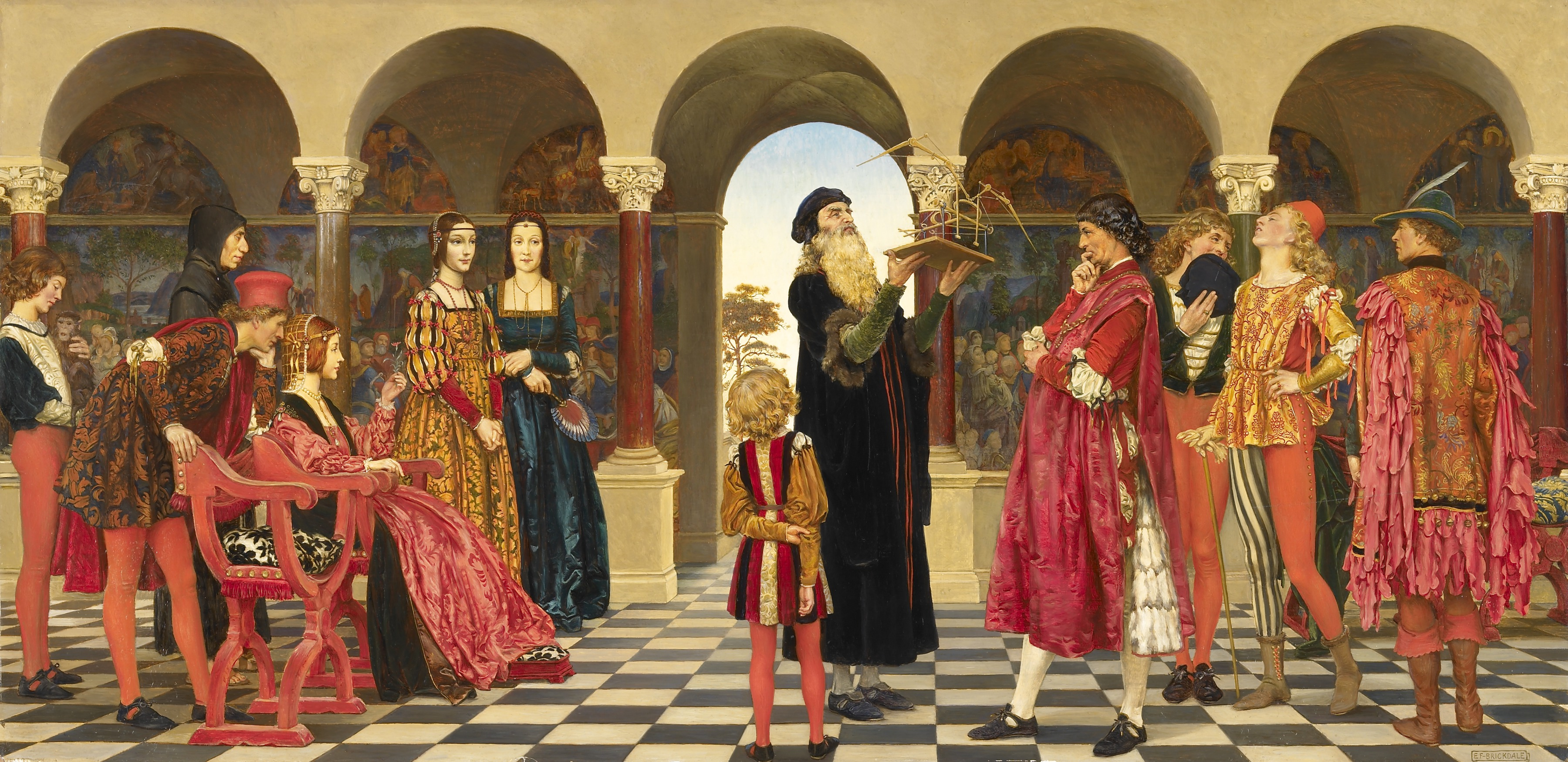
The Forerunner or The Court of Ludovico il Moro. Eleanor Fortescue-Brickdale. On the left, you can recognize Duchess Beatrice, to whom a courtier whispers something in her ear; fra' Savonarola, Cecilia Gallerani and Elisabetta Gonzaga; a page also embraces a monkey, a tribute to the one actually owned by the dukes. On the right Leonardo da Vinci shows his model flying machine to Duke Ludovico; some courtiers and the little blond Ercole Massimilianoassist amused.

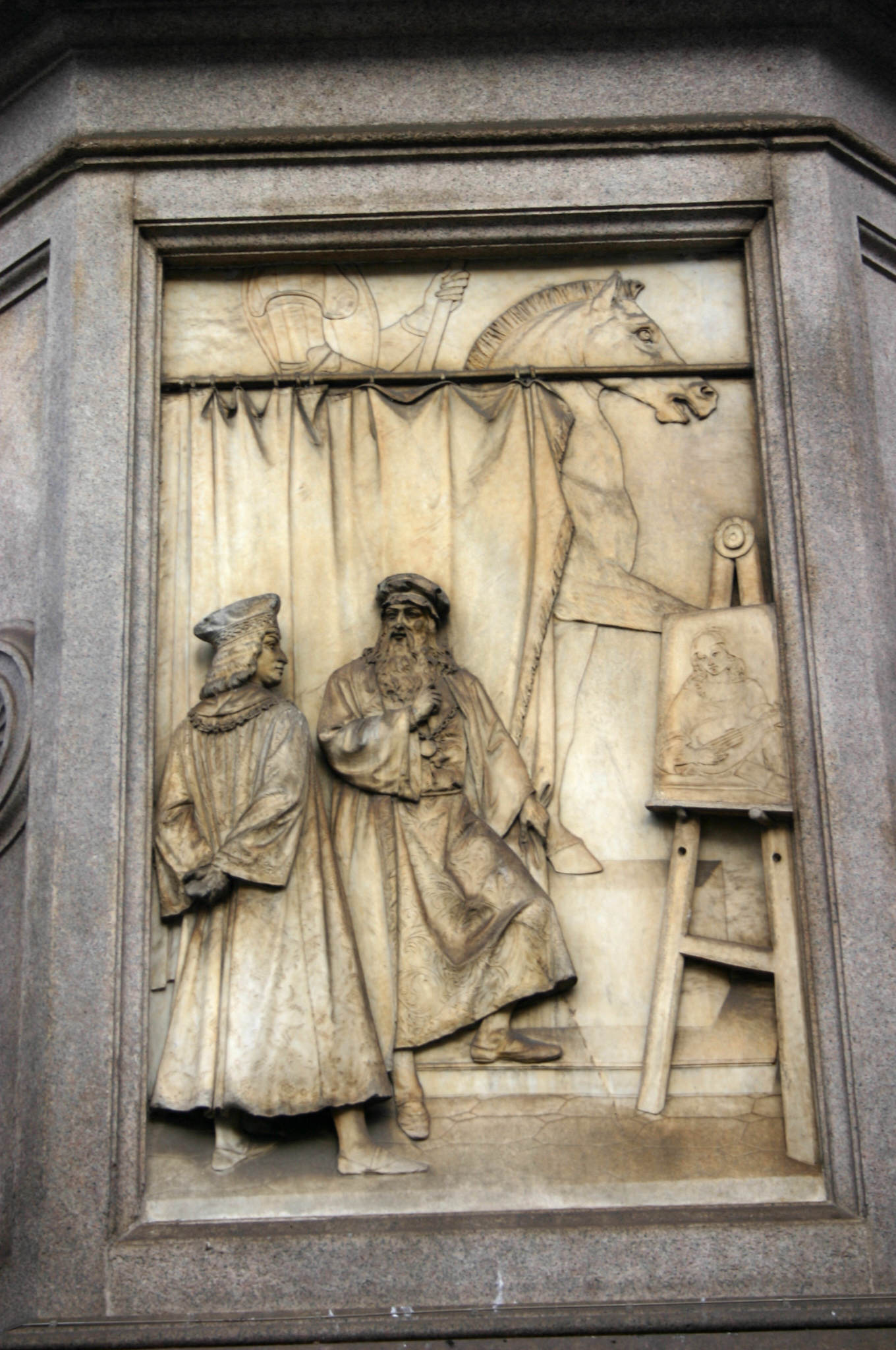
The monument to Leonardo da Vinci in Piazza della Scala in Milan. Detail: Leonardo shows Ludovico il Moro the plaster for the bronze of the "Sforza horse".

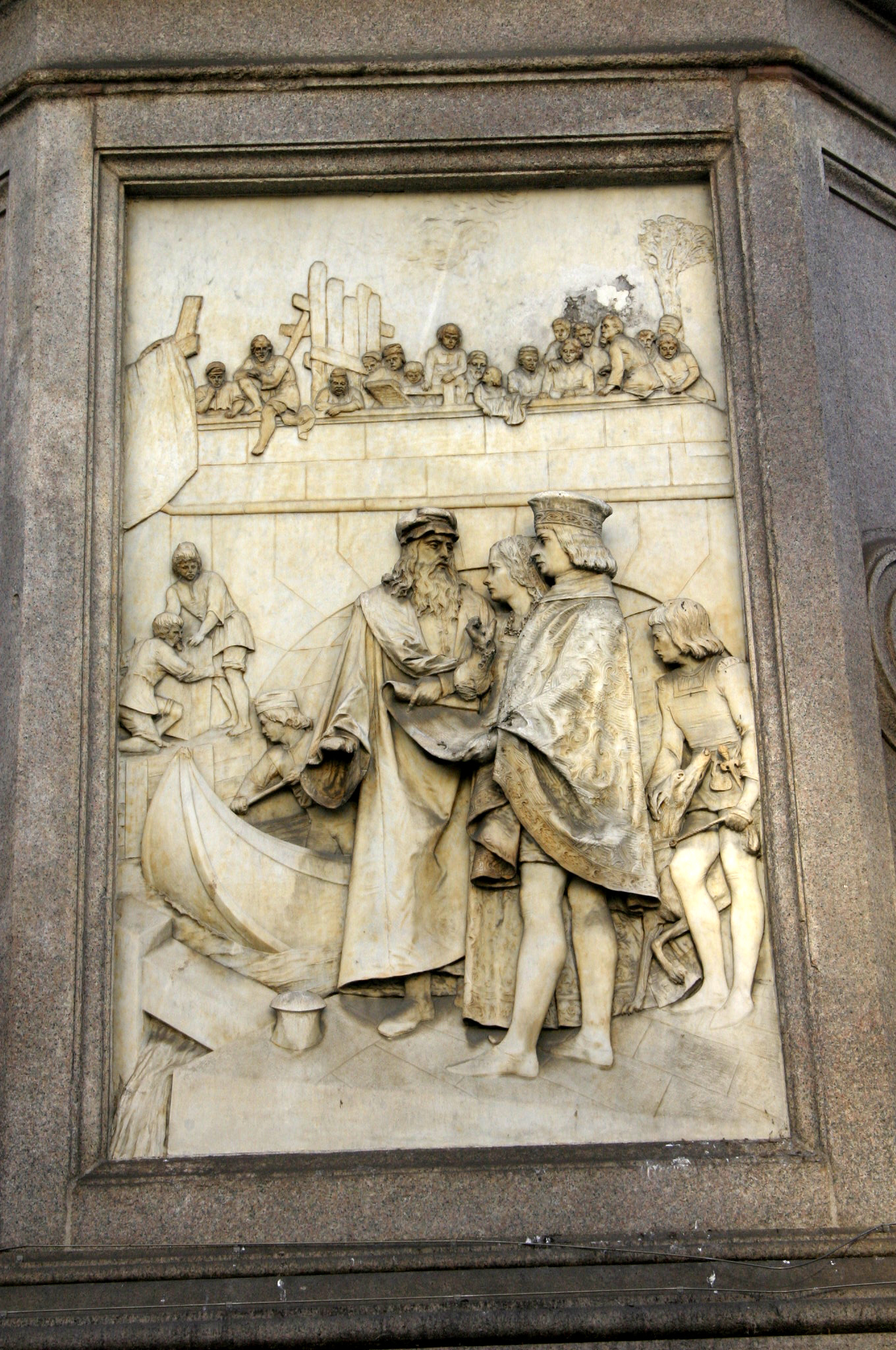
Leonardo shows the locks of the canals to the dukes Ludovico and Beatrice.

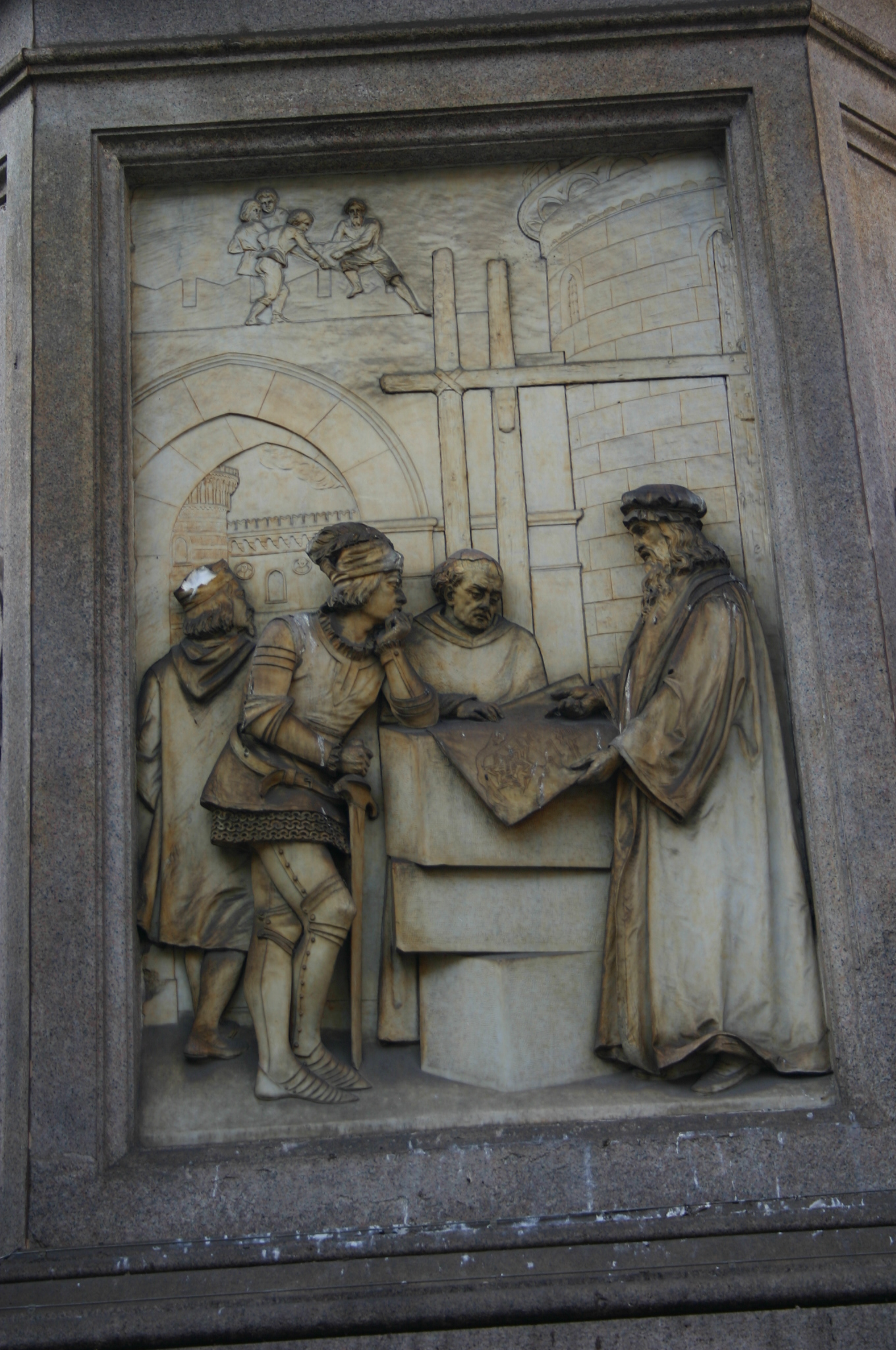
Leonardo shows the plans for the fortifications at the Moro.

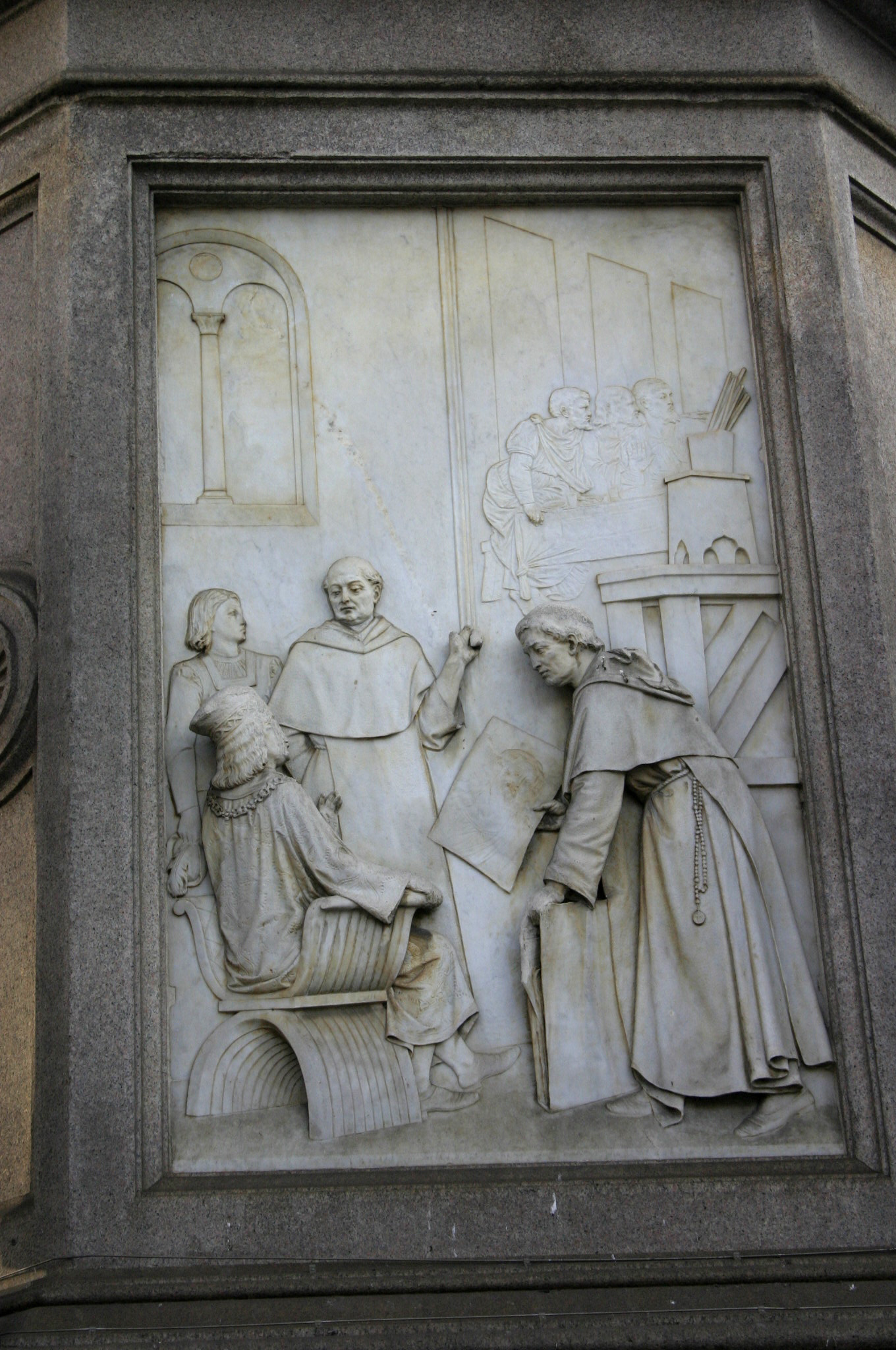
Ludovico examines Leonardo's Last Supper.

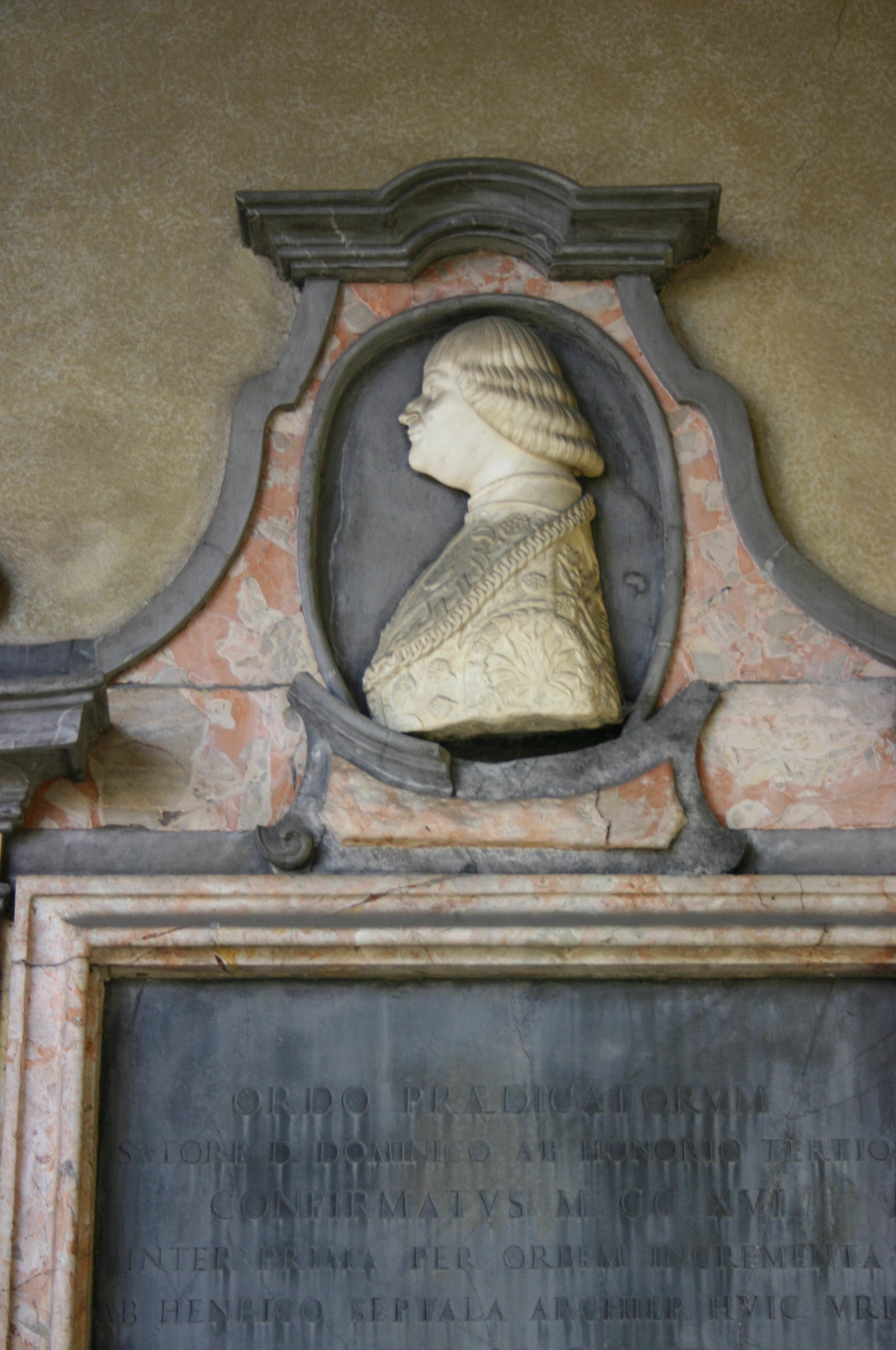
Commemorative plaque of the benefactor Ludovico (1670) in the cloister of the basilica of Santa Maria delle Grazie in Milan

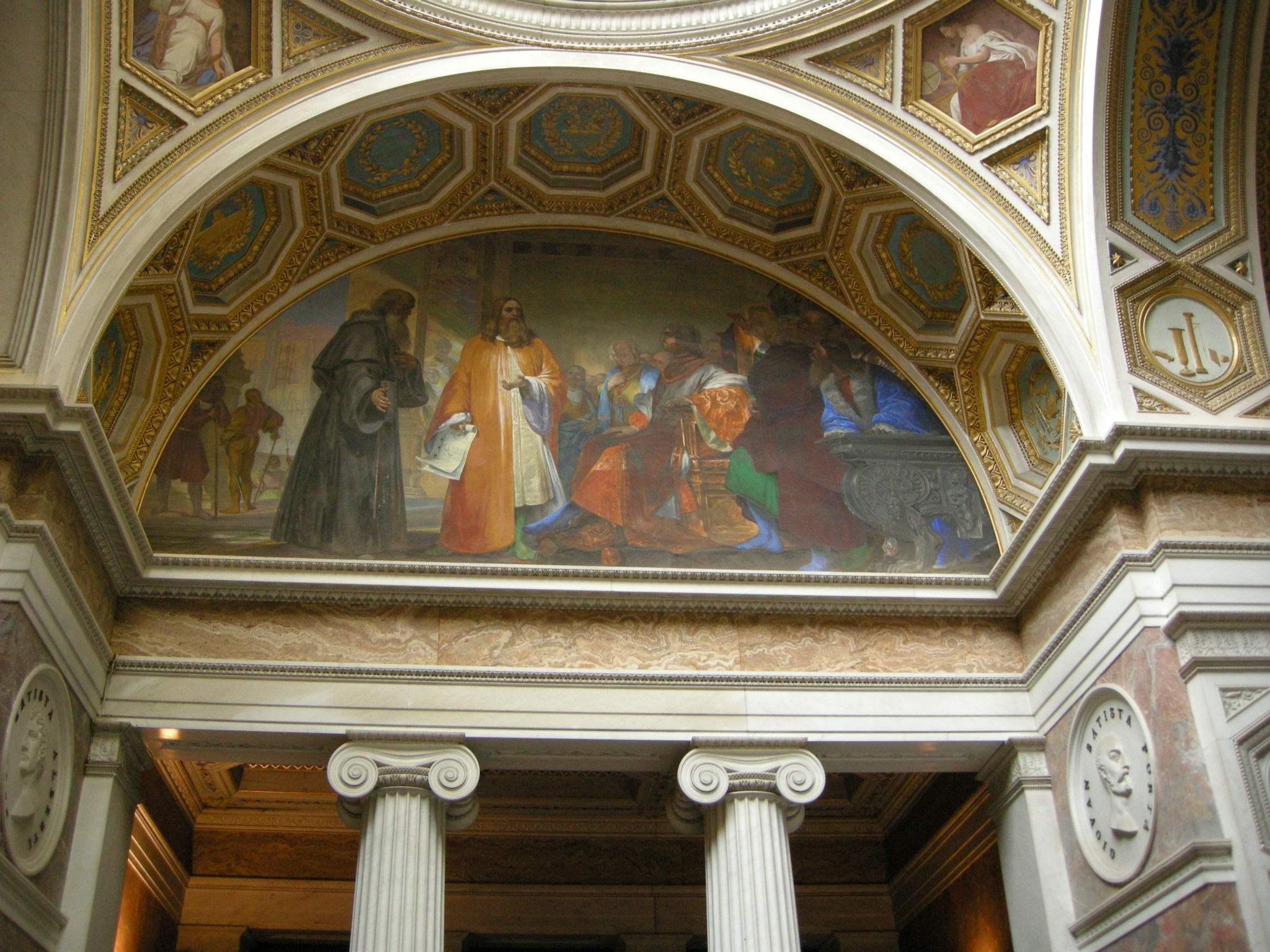
Leonardo da Vinci in the presence of Duke Ludovico, Nicola Cianfanelli, lunette of Galileo's Tribune, 1841

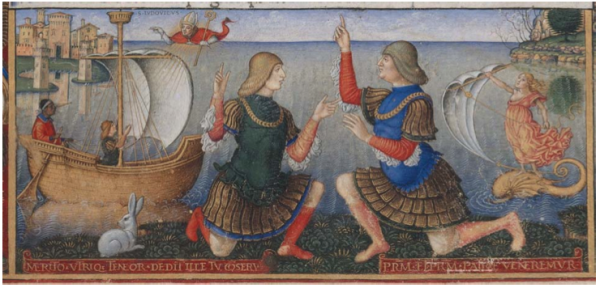
Gian Galeazzo and Ludovico in the miniature of Giovanni Pietro Biragonella at the Sforziade by Giovanni Simonetta, imprinted in Milan by Antonio Zarotto, 1490, National Library of France, Paris

== In popular culture ==
=== Literature ===
Ludovico is the protagonist in several literary works.

==== Tragedies ====
- La morte di Ludovico Sforza detto il Moro, by Pietro Ferrari (1791).
- Lodovico Sforza detto il Moro, by Giovanni Battista Niccolini (1833).
- Lodovico il Moro, by Giuseppe Campagna (1842).
- Gli Sforza by Antonio Dall'Acqua Giusti (1856).
- Cicco Simonetta: dramma, with historical preface, by Carlo Belgiojoso (1858).

==== Novels ====
- Lodovico il Moro, by Giovanni Campiglio (1837).
- La città ardente – novel by Lodovico il Moro, by Dino Bonardi (1933).
- Poisons, women and intrigues at the court of Ludovico il Moro, by Ezio Maria Seveso (1967)
- I cento giorni del duca, by Laura Malinverni (2018)
- Il Moro – Gli Sforza nella Milano di Leonardo, by Carlo Maria Lomartire (2019).

==== Comics ====
- Ludovico il Moro – Signore di Milano, comic strip of 2010.

He also appears as a character in:

- Cicco Simonetta: drama, with historical preface, by Carlo Belgiojoso (1858).
- Leonardo – the Resurrection of the Gods, by Dmitry Mereskovsky (1901).
- The Duchess of Milan, by Michael Ennis (1992).
- L'invito di Ludovico il Moro, by Federico G. Martini (1998).
- The Swans of Leonardo, by Karen Essex (2006).
- The days of love and war, by Carla Maria Russo (2016).
- La misura dell'uomo, by Marco Malvaldi (2018).
- Leonardo da Vinci – The Renaissance of the Dead, by G. Albertini, G. Gualdoni and G. Staffa (2019).

=== Cinema ===
- In the 1971 RAI miniseries The Life of Leonardo da Vinci, Ludovico is played by Giampiero Albertini.
- In the 1974 film Young Lucrezia, he is played by Piero Lulli.
- In the 1981 miniseries The Borgias, he is portrayed by Robert Ashby.
- In the 2004 film Le grandi dame di casa d'Este by Diego Ronsisvalle, he is played by Paolo Catani.
- In the 2011 Canal+ series Borgia, he appears as a cameo, played by Florian Fitz.
- In the 2011 Showtime series The Borgias, Ludovico Sforza is portrayed by English actor Ivan Kaye.
- In the 2016 documentary film Leonardo da Vinci – Il genio a Milano, he is played by Vincenzo Amato.
- In the 2016–2019 Anglo-Italian television series I Medici, he is played by Daniele Pecci.
- In the 2019 film Io, Leonardo, he is played by Massimo de Lorenzo.
- In the 2019 film Essere Leonardo da Vinci, he is played by Paolo Terenzi, although it constitutes a simple appearance.
- In the 2021 series Leonardo Ludovico Sforza is portrayed by English actor James D'Arcy.

=== Culinary ===
The dolceriso del Moro, a typical dessert of the comune (municipality) of Vigevano, in Lombardy, is dedicated to Ludovico. Its invention is traditionally attributed to the Duchess Beatrice herself, who would have conceived it in the spring of 1491 to please her illustrious consort. It is a type of ricotta rice pudding, closed in a shortcrust pastry wrapper and enriched with candied fruit, pine nuts, almonds and rose water. This last ingredient served to induce harmony and fidelity in the couple.

=== Legends ===
- Ludovico is linked to one of the legends that arose around the invention of panettone, which would have been baked for the first time in his kitchens.
- Around the origin of the nickname Moro there is an ancient popular legend according to which Ludovico was as a child initially called "the Bull" because of his strength and impetuousness, while "il Moro" was the nickname of one of his plebeian playmates, Cesarino della Griona, who was incredibly similar to him if not for the fact of always being dirty. One day, which was Christmas 1462, the two decided as a joke to exchange roles: while Cesarino, washed and well dressed, pretended to be Ludovico in the hall of the court, the real Ludovico went down the chimney hood tied to a rope but got stuck. Cesarino himself rushed to his friend's cries for help, freeing him by tugging him by the feet. At that point Duke Francesco Sforza, seeing his son all black for the soot, judged it necessary to exchange the nicknames of the two children, and so it was that Ludovico became "the Moor", and Cesarino, for the strength demonstrated, "the Bull". It is also said that this legend is the basis of the famous story The Prince and the Pauper by Mark Twain.
- Among the various ghosts that would inhabit the castle of Vigevano, including that of his wife Beatrice, it is also said of a white horse that was seen running down the staircase leading to the Doge's Square and here travel three laps of it before disappearing. The horse would have been the favourite of Ludovico, who would have wanted to avoid the dangers of war during the fateful defeat of Novara in 1500. In search of its master and finding the doors of the fortress barred, the animal would have beaten its hooves on the pavement of the square with such violence as to open a chasm into which it would finally fall.

== Lineage ==
Legitimate children

By his wife Beatrice d'Este, daughter of Ercole I d'Este, he had the following children:

- Ercole Massimiliano (1493–1530), count of Pavia, duke of Milan 1513 – 1515;
- Sforza Francesco (1495–1535), Prince of Rossano and Count of Borrello 1497 – 1498, Count of Pavia and Duke of Milan 1521 – 1524 married in 1533 to Christina of Denmark (1522–1590), daughter of King Christian II of Denmark.
- The third son, also a male, was born dead and, not having been baptized, could not be placed with his mother in the tomb. Ludovico, heartbroken, therefore had him buried above the door of the cloister of Santa Maria delle Grazie with this Latin epitaph: "O unhappy childbirth! I lost my life before I was born, and more unhappy, by dying I took the life of my mother and the father deprived his wife. In so much adverse fate, this alone can be of comfort to me, that divine parents bore me, Ludovico and Beatrice dukes of Milan. 1497, January 2."

Natural children

Ludovico had a series of natural children, all legitimized, which over the years greatly enlarged the ducal family and allowed Sforza himself to cement some alliances:

From his mistress Bernardina de Corradis he had:

- Bianca Giovanna (1482 – Milan, 23 November 1496), married Galeazzo Sanseverino, lord of Bobbio.

By his lover Cecilia Gallerani he had one son:

- Cesare (Milan, 1491 – 1514), abbot of the Basilica of San Nazaro in Brolo in Milan from 1498, canon from 1503.

By his lover Lucrezia Crivelli he had two children:

- Giovanni Paolo I Sforza or Giampaolo I Sforza (Milan, 14 March 1497 – Naples, 13 December 1535), from whom the Sforza branch of Caravaggio descends, married Violante Bentivoglio of the Counts of Campagna and lords of Bologna;
- A second child was born, probably, in 1500, since Lucrezia was once again pregnant when she found refuge with the Marquise Isabella d'Este.

From his lover Romana he had:

- Leone (1476 – Milan, 1496), between the end of 1495 and the beginning of 1496 married the young noblewoman Margherita Grassi, already widow of his uncle Giulio Sforza, to whom he had given a son. He died shortly after the wedding without having had offspring. He is often confused with his uncle of the same name, the latter abbot of San Vittore in Vigevano since 1495.

From obscure mistresses he had:

- Galeazzo, eldest son, born before 1476 and died a child, probably already before 1483, because in his first will, dating back to that year, Ludovico does not mention other children than Bianca and Leone.
- Sforza (1484/1485–1487).

Perhaps he also had another illegitimate son unknown to us if, as reported by Bernardino Corio, in 1496 three of his bastard sons died, namely Leo, Bianca, and a third who cannot be identified with any of the aforementioned.

== Ancestors ==
Ancestors of Ludovico Sforza

8. Giovanni Attendolo
4. Muzio Attendolo Sforza
9. Elisa Petraccini
2. Francesco I Sforza
5. Lucia da Torsciano
1. Ludovico Sforza
12. Gian Galeazzo Visconti
6. Filippo Maria Visconti
13. Caterina Visconti
3. Bianca Maria Visconti
14. Ambrogio del Maino
7. Agnese del Maino

== Notes ==
Italian nobility
Preceded by Gian Galeazzo Sforza	Duke of Milan; 1494–1499	Succeeded by Louis II
