= The Palio of Districts of Trento =

The Palio of Districts of Trento (in Italian: Il palio delle Contrade di Trento) is a celebration in remembrance of the Battle of Calliano (1487) and takes place every year in September in the city of Trento, the capital of Trentino in Trentino-Alto Adige/Südtirol, a region of Northern Italy.

== Historical origin ==
The Palio is celebrated to remember the victory of the medieval Battle of Calliano, which ensued on the 10th August 1487 between the forces of the Republic of Venice and the combined forces of the Prince-Bishopric of Trento and of the County of Tirol in the hands of Sigismund of Habsburg, Archduke of Austria and ruler of Tirol from 1446 to 1490.

The forces of Trento and Tirol managed to defeat the soldiers of the Republic of Venice, under the command of Roberto Sanseverino d'Aragona (who died in the conflict) in the municipality of Pomarolo, near Calliano and Rovereto and 15 kilometres far from Trento.

== Program ==
The Palio of Districts of Trento consists in three days of festivity in the month of September, during which the eight districts (in Italian: contrade) of Trento engage in archery competitions. The tree-day festival is introduced by Il Corteggio (in English: The Court) and L'investitura dell'arciere (in English: The Investiture of the Archer) and ends with the delivery of La Feretra Imperiale to the archer of the winning District.

=== The Court ===
This event precedes the start of the celebrations and is a procession, in which around 500 people parade along the streets of the city centre, wearing medieval clothing representing the eight districts of Trento.

=== The Investiture of the Archer ===
The Investiture of the Archer occurs the day before the start of the Palio. In this occasion, each participating archer has to swear publicly in Piazza Duomo to be loyal to their own district. In turn, the archers receive the title of archer, their chosen battle name, the Tallero Stretto (official coin of the Palio) and three arrows to be used in the archery competitions.

This ceremony is officiated by a city official (usually the Mayor of Trento) and by the Prior of the Districts.

=== Archery competitions ===
The archers of the different districts face both ability and velocity trials from 15 meters. The final trial is contended by the three archers, who have achieved the highest scores in the first two trials.

=== The Imperial Feretra ===
The archer who wins the final trial obtains the Feretra Imperiale, the Palio, which is bestowed upon him by the Mayor of Trento.

=== Additional events ===
In the course of the festival, there are usually additional events, such as:

- Medieval Arts and Professions special Fair: a fair where medieval professions and skills are shown by local artisans and artists, who wear medieval clothing for the occasion.
- Photographic Contest for Amateurs: a contest on a different topic for each edition of the Palio.

== Districts ==
The districts involved in the Palio are eight:

- Contrada Larga: it encloses Via Belenzani, Via delle Orne, Galleria Tirrena and Piazza Duomo. Originally, it was characterised by many towers and small forts. When these were removed, it acquired the present name (in English: Large District) to denote the new look: it was not narrow anymore, but rather wide.
- Contrada San Benedetto: it encloses Via Oss Mazurana, Piazza Pasi, Piazza C. Battisti, Via Diaz, Passaggio San Benedetto and Via Malpaga. Its name refers to the now disappeared Church of San Benedetto and it was given in the 13th Century.
- Contrada degli Orevesi: it encloses Via S. Pietro, Piazzetta Anfiteatro and Vicolo degli Orbi. In the past this was a district in which the majority of the shops were owned by orevesi (in English: goldsmiths). It was also known as the District of S. Pietro, due to the Church of San Pietro.
- Contrada del Macello Vecchio: it encloses Via Mantova, Largo Carducci, Via del Simonino and Via Galileo Galilei. It is called District of the Old Slaughterhouse because in Largo Carducci, (also known as Piazza del Macello), the slaughter was carried out and the nearby shops were mostly owned by butchers.
- Contrada Todesca: it encloses Via del Suffragio, Via San Marco and Piazza della Mostra. Its name, German District, is due to the fact that this part of the city was occupied by German people.
- Contrada Santa Maria Maddalena: it encloses Via S. M. Maddalena, Via Livio Marchetti, Via Dietro Le Mura B, Via F. Ferruccio, Vicolo S. Maria Maddalena. Its name refers to the now disappeared Church of Santa Maria Maddalena.
- Contrada Santa Maria: it encloses Via Cavour, Piazza S. M. Maggiore, Via Prepositura, Via delle Orfane, Via Torre Vanga, Via Zanella, Piazza Lainez and Via Pozzo. This district was also called District of the Orphans due to the presence of an Orphanage, which was at first dedicated to both males and females. Later on, though, it was for female orphans exclusively.
- Borgo Antico San Martino: it encloses Via S. Martino, Via Torre d'Augusto, Largo N. Sauro, Via Malvasia, Via Manzoni and Piazza R. Sanzio. It takes its name from the Church of San Martino.

== Editions ==
In total, the Palio has been celebrated fifteen times, from 2000 to 2015. The fifteen editions are shown in the table below:

Edition	Date	Winning District
1	September 9–10, 2000	Santa Maria
2	September 8–9, 2001	Santa Maria
3	September 7–8, 2002	San Benedetto
4	September 12-13-14, 2003	San Benedetto
5	September 10-11-12, 2004	San Benedetto
6	September 8-9-10, 2006	Antico Borgo di S. Martino
7	September 7-8-9, 2007	San Benedetto
8	September 12-13-14, 2008	Macello Vecchio
9	September 11-12-13, 2009	Larga
10	September 10-11-12, 2010	San Benedetto
11	September 9-10-11, 2011	San Benedetto
12	September 7-8-9, 2012	San Benedetto
13	September 6-7-8, 2013	San Benedetto
14	September 5-6-7, 2014	Santa Maria
15	September 4-5-6, 2015	Larga

In September 2016 the festival did not occur due mainly to insufficient private sponsors. The next edition is expected for September 1-2-3, 2017.

== Organising Association ==
The Palio of Districts of Trento is organised and promoted by the association Associazione Culturale Amici Città in collaboration with Comune di Trento, A. P. T di Trento, Autonomous Province of Trento and Autonomous Region Trentino-Alto Adige/Südtirol.
