= Roberto Sanseverino d'Aragona =

Italian condottiero (1418–1487)

Roberto da Sanseverino
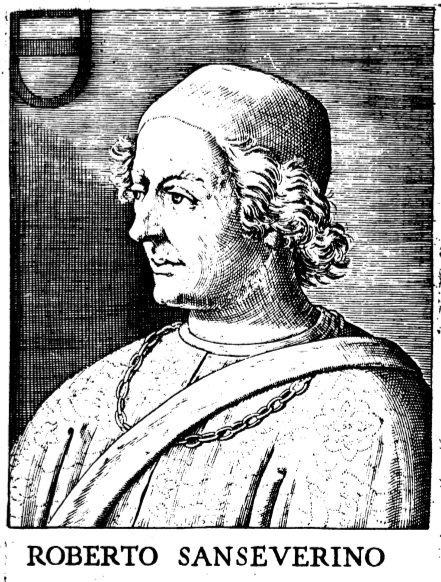
- Portrait of the leader Roberto Sanseverino of Aragon, Aliprando Caprioli, 1646
- Born: 1418; Naples
- Died: 10 August 1487; Battle of Calliano
- Burial place: San Francesco, Milan
- Spouse(s): Giovanna da Correggio; Elisabetta da Montefeltro (?); Lucrezia Malavolti.
- Military career
- Allegiance: Milan (1440s–1458; 1471); Naples (1460–1463); Florence (1467); Savoy (1476); Genoa (1478); Venice (1482–1487); Holy See (1485)
- Service years: 1440s–1487
- Rank: captain general
- Conflicts: Battle of Troia, Battle of Molinella, Burgundian Wars (Battle on the Planta), War of Ferrara, Battle of Calliano

Roberto Sanseverino d'Aragona (1418 – 10 August 1487) was an Italian condottiero, count of Colorno from 1458 to 1477 and count of Caiazzo from 1460 until his death in 1487. A highly esteemed man of arms, and a veteran of numerous battles, he was one of the greatest leaders of the Italian Renaissance.

He was Marquis of Castelnuovo Scrivia, Count of Caiazzo and Colorno and Lord of Albanella, Cittadella, Corleto Monforte, Corte Madama, Felitto, Lugano, Mendrisio, Montorio Veronese, Pontecurone, Roscigno, Serre and Solaro.

== Biography ==
He was born in Naples as the son of Leonetto Sanseverino and Elisa Sforza, sister of Francesco Sforza, Duke of Milan. He assumed the surname of Aragon by concession of the king of the Kingdom of Naples Ferrante of Aragon.

He was a general in the service first of his uncle Francesco Sforza, on whose behalf he defended Arcevia from the attacks of Piccinino (1442–1443) and then in the sieges of Pavia, Cremona, Como and in the battle of Caravaggio (1447–1449). Always in the service of Sforza, who in the meantime became Duke of Milan, with Bartolomeo Colleoni he beat the Venetians at Genivolta in July 1452. In 1458 he went on pilgrimage to the Holy Land and left a detailed diary of the journey. On his return he was sent by the Sforza, in the second fortnight of October 1460 to the aid of the king of the Kingdom of Naples Ferrante d'Aragona and participated until 1464 in the war between the Aragonese and the Angevins for the possession of the Kingdom, following the conspiracy of the Barons. Between 1462 and 1463 he distinguished himself in the subjugation of numerous Apulian cities still rebellious: Accadia, Troia, Serracapriola, Manfredonia and Monte Sant'Angelo. His role at the battle of Troia was particularly impactful, leading the heavy cavalry to victory and securing his throne.

He came into conflict with King Ferrante, who would not have granted him what he had been promised, and then also with the Duke of Milan, with whom he did not find an agreement for the renewal of the conduct; he then passed into the service of the Republic of Florence against the Republic of Venice and on 25 July 1467 participated in the battle of Riccardina (also called the Battle of Molinella), where he was noted for his valor.

In 1471 he again stipulated a four-year conduct with Galeazzo Maria Sforza who also renewed the investiture of Colorno. His company at that time often stayed in Romagna and Roberto frequented the lords of Bologna, the Bentivoglio, to whom he was linked by friendship: he was present in Bologna when the very young Hannibal was knighted by King Christian I of Denmark in 1474.

In the autumn of 1476 he fought in the Duchy of Savoy against the troops commanded by the Duke of Burgundy Charles the Bold, sacking Santhià and San Germano Vercellese. But in December he was forced to return quickly to Milan where Duke Galeazzo Maria Sforza had been assassinated. During the regency of the Duchy of Bona of Savoy, mother of Gian Galeazzo Maria, he came into conflict with Cicco Simonetta, advisor to the regent, who did not renew his contract of conduct and who for this reason later became unpopular with the Ghibelline party. Ludovico Sforza, with the help of his brother Sforza Maria, tried to oppose the regency of Bona and tried to defeat Simonetta with weapons, but was forced into exile; even the Sanseverino fled, passing the Ticino with some of its veterans and cutting the rope of the port so that it could not be pursued.

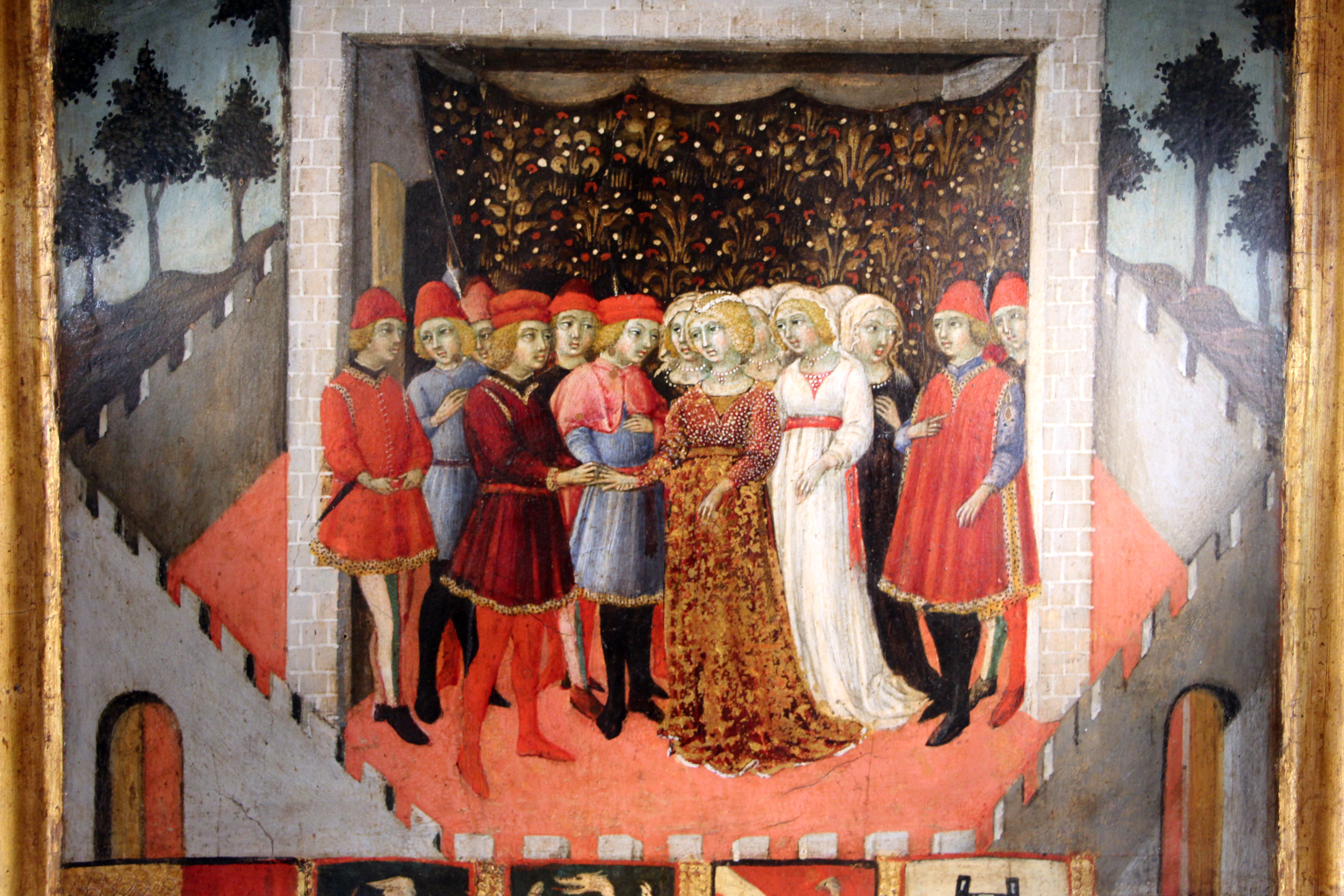
The Wedding of Roberto Sanseverino and Lucrezia Malavolti, 1472–73

Here he showed great cunning when, having learned that Count Borella da Caravaggio by order of Cicco Simonetta was chasing him, he spread the rumor among the villains of the place that it was instead he himself to chase Count Borella with the task of capturing him for "some sceleraggini" committed against the Duke of Milan. The villains believed in Sanseverino and not in Count Borella, who was imprisoned, so that Roberto could safely reach Asti and from here France; sentenced in absentia to beheading, his assets were confiscated in favor of Ercole I d'Este.

He then became captain general of the Republic of Genoa which he defended from the attack of the Milanese (1478). The following year he was under the service of Pope Sixtus IV in the war against Florence. While returning from Tuscany he was joined in Lunigiana by Galeazzo Maria Sforza and Ludovico Sforza who fled from exile who with the support of the king of Naples tried to return to Milan still under the regency of Bona of Savoy. Sanseverino was convinced to support the decisive attack and after the conquest of Tortona and the capture of various castles and strongholds entered Milan in September 1479, also following the reconciliation of Ludovico Sforza with the Duchess Bona. Roberto was given back his possessions and had Lugano, Balerna and Mendrisio in fief. He was called to be part of the ducal council, until 1481, when he had disagreements with the new duke.

In 1482 he was hired by Venice: between the spring and summer of that year he was engaged in the long and exhausting war against Ferrara instigated by Girolamo Riario, lord of Forlì, with the support of Pope Sixtus IV: in May the Venetian troops, led by Roberto Sanseverino, attacked the Duchy of Ferrara from the north, conquering the territory of Rovigo, sacking Comacchio and besieging Ficarolo (which capitulated on 29 June). In addition, starting from Ravenna, they attacked from the south-east, taking Argenta and going up the Po di Primaro from the mouth. In November the Venetians arrived under the walls of Ferrara which was under siege. The military situation changed radically in December when Pope Sixtus IV, under pressure from Ludovico il Moro, Duke of Milan, who feared that the Serenissima would become too powerful and therefore dangerous for the Duchy of Milan, changed alliance and made peace with the Este to fight the Venetians. With the Peace of Bagnolo, on August 7, 1484, Venice retained almost all the conquered possessions; Sanseverino was elected captain general of the Italian League for nine years; he was given a conduct of 600 spears and an annual salary of 120,000 ducats (6,000 to be paid by the pontiff, 8,000 by the king of Naples, 50,000 by Venice, 50,000 by the Duke of Milan and 6,000 by Florence). He was returned the assets confiscated in the Kingdom of Naples and in Milan; his son Giovan Francesco was assigned the county of Caiazzo.

In October 1485 Roberto obtained permission from the Venetians to pass to the pay of the Papal States to fight the Aragonese and the Orsini, their allies.

The military campaign, however, turned out to be a defeat and Pope Innocent VIII himself, at the appropriate time, found an agreement with the Neapolitans and fired Sanseverino who, apparently, blackmailed the pontiff, threatening to abandon him if he did not grant one of his sons the title of cardinal. The Sanseverino fled chased by the troops of the enemy daringly towards the borders of Venice and then took refuge in his possessions near Cittadella.

=== Death ===
He returned to command of the Venetian troops in the war that arose for reasons of duties against Sigismund of Habsburg in 1487; he occupied Rovereto and from the Val Lagarina he focused on Trento. He occupied the Castle of Nomi, Castel Pietra and Castel Beseno, but on August 10 in an ambush in the battle of Calliano the Sanseverino was overwhelmed in the route. Hearing that the Germans were coming down armed from the mountains in large quantities, he with his men went back to the Adige river, but found that the bridge had already been broken by Andrea dal Borgo for fear that the enemies would pass, or in an attempt to force the Venetian soldiers to fight.

Then, seeing himself trapped, he began to urge the soldiers to turn to the enemies and want to fight and die valiantly, but those preferred to swim in an attempt to cross the river, and for the most part drowned. Robert alone fought with a few brave trusted and was mortally wounded in the throat, saying he preferred a glorious death rather than drowning in the river as many did.

The episode of the Venetian rout [...] and the death of Roberto Sanseverino is one of the most pitiful and significant in our military history in the fifteenth century. That brave, daring and almost reckless commander perished in a battle not against regular and well-trained troops, but against mountain men [...]; he perished for the cowardice of his soldiers, who did not dare to fight against the ferocity of the Germans and only tried to save themselves by throwing themselves into the river. Sigismondo de 'Conti says that "if Roberto perished in the waters or under enemy iron it was not possible to know, since, after searching for a long time, he was not found either alive or dead" but our chronicler (who knows the news from Court of Este, certainly perfectly informed) describes him while, with pride in accordance with his generous nature, he is hit in the throat, having preferred to die fighting and showing his face to the enemies, rather than fleeing trying to save himself by swimming in the Adige. Even the date of August 10, which brings our Zambotti back to the battle, is the true one, not that of August 17, reported by others.

— Giuseppe Pardi, nota al Diario Ferrarese di Bernardino Zambotti.

Bernardino Corio and Marin Sanudo also agree that Roberto died fighting. According to them, however, the bridge was not deliberately cut by Andrea dal Borgo, but broke by itself due to the fury of those who crossed it. Andrea dal Borgo was however led in chains to Venice, blamed for having been the cause of the defeat of the leader, for not having wanted to give him help.

Ruberto Sanseverino, as abandoned, remained among the enemies, proving an excellent captain and a private soldier; and although he was cruelly wounded, nevertheless he fought valiantly with that sword with which not only in all of Italy, but also among the barbarian armies, he had so often won very happy victory, killing many around him. Finally, for the shedding of blood, which he shed due to his wounds, lacking in all human strength, gloriously he was deprived of his life, among the thick ranks of the enemies, being in the age of seventy years.

— Bernardino Corio, Historia di Milano.

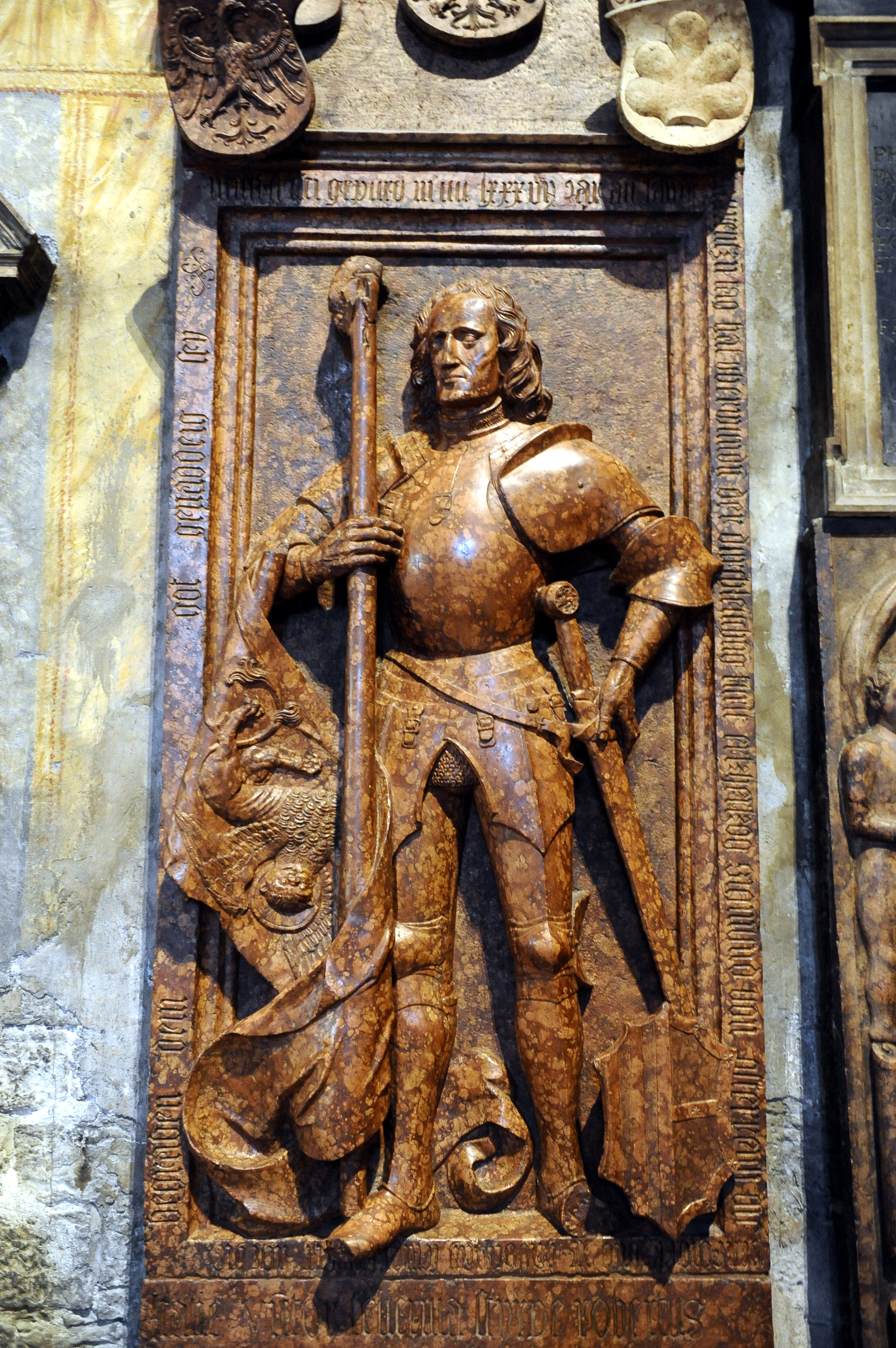
Trento Cathedral. Funeral monument of Roberto Sanseverino d'Aragona.

Messer Pedro, his secretary, stated that, before dying, Robert received a sword wound in the eye, two of schioppetto: one in the arm and the other in the knee; a blow of the sword to the right hand and finally a blow, deadly, of spear to the neck. According to another source, he was pierced to death by a Colleonesco soldier and pushed into the river. Ludovico il Moro, who seemed to take pleasure in the death of his great enemy, painted him instead while several times he tried to escape, without success, towards the river, and died not in battle but on the way to Trento, where he was to be taken prisoner.

Among the fallen that day there were also Malatesta Baglioni, Gian Francesco and Antonio da Tolentino. Roberto's corpse was not found so soon, but was finally recovered by the Germans who took him to Trento and buried him with solemn funerals in the crypt of the cathedral.

Non potendo per forza ingegno ed arte
Spenger il tuo valor constante e forte
L'empia fortuna s'accordò con Morte
Che te assediaro da ciascuna parte.
Ma non fé mai di sé tal prova Marte
Qual fatto hai tu con le tue squadre accorte,
Ed hai morendo tante genti morte,
Che di te sarà scritto in mille carte.
Nulla giova acquistare in terra onore
Ed ogni nostro affaticare è vano;
Quel solo ha gloria eterna che ben more;
Morto, Roberto, sei con l'arme in mano:
Bel fine a te, che gli è gran disonore
Morir in su le piume un capitano

— Antonio Tebaldeo, Sonetto per la morte del invictissimo signor Roberto Sanseverino.

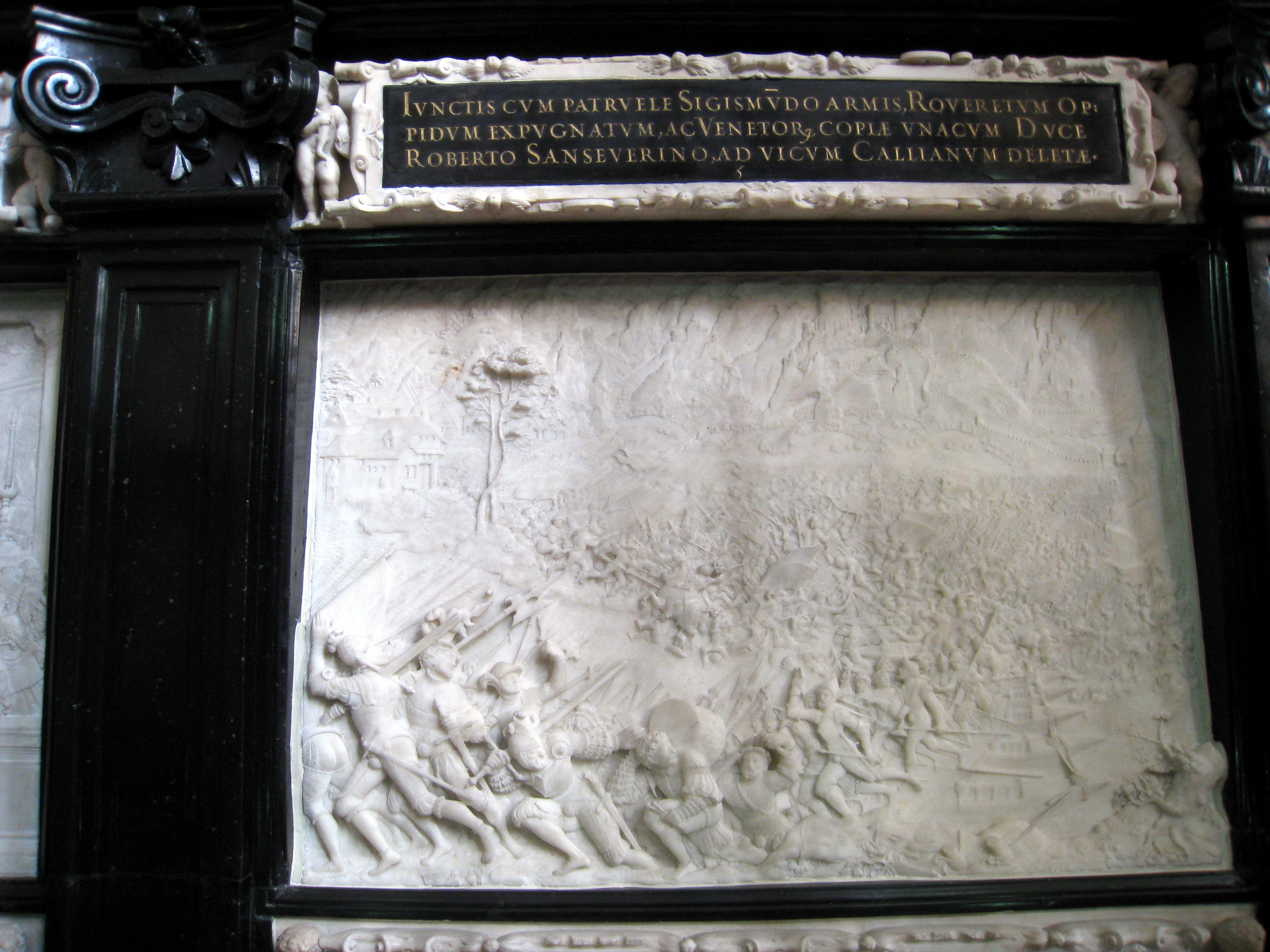
Scene of the Battle of Callian on the cenotaph of Maximilian I, by Alexander Colyn

In 1498, the body was transported at the request of his sons and Ludovico il Moro to Milan to be buried in the church of San Francesco Grande, in a chapel he had built. When the church was demolished in 1809 all traces of his remains were lost. In Venice in the Doge's Palace the following inscription was placed in his memory:

Bellorum domitor, Severina stirpe Robertus/ Alter qui nostro tempore Cesar erat,/ Cuius virtutem Feraria ferrea sensit/ Horruit Aemilia celsasque Roma tremit./ Frenavit Janue partes Liguremque superbum/ Italiae terror teutonicusque metus,/ Fortuna invida regat posta fata Tridenti,/ Quod non vita sibi, mors inopina dedit.

== Appearance and personality ==
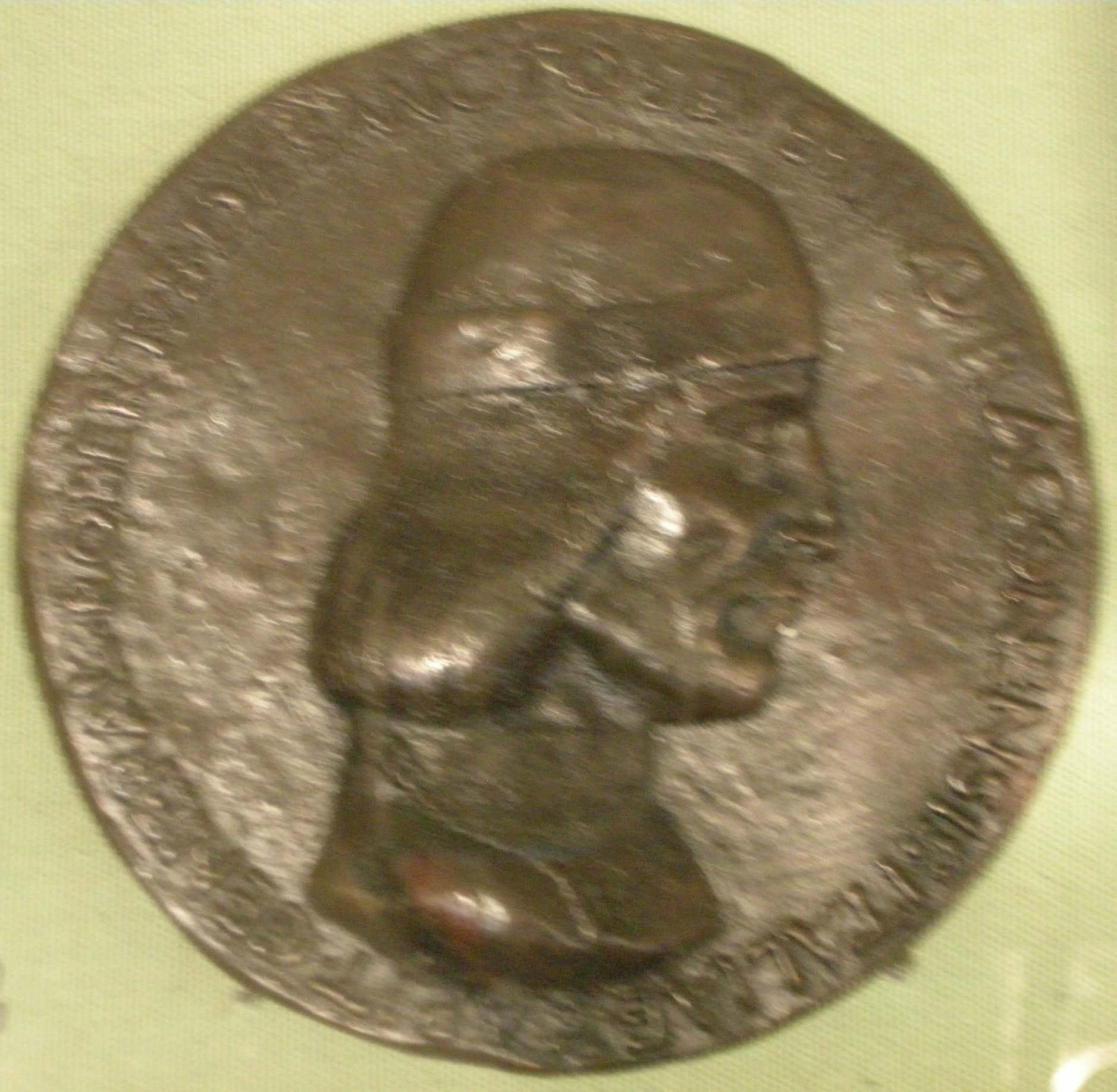
Neapolitan artist of the fifteenth century, Roberto Sanseverino d'Aragona captain general, 1486 ca.

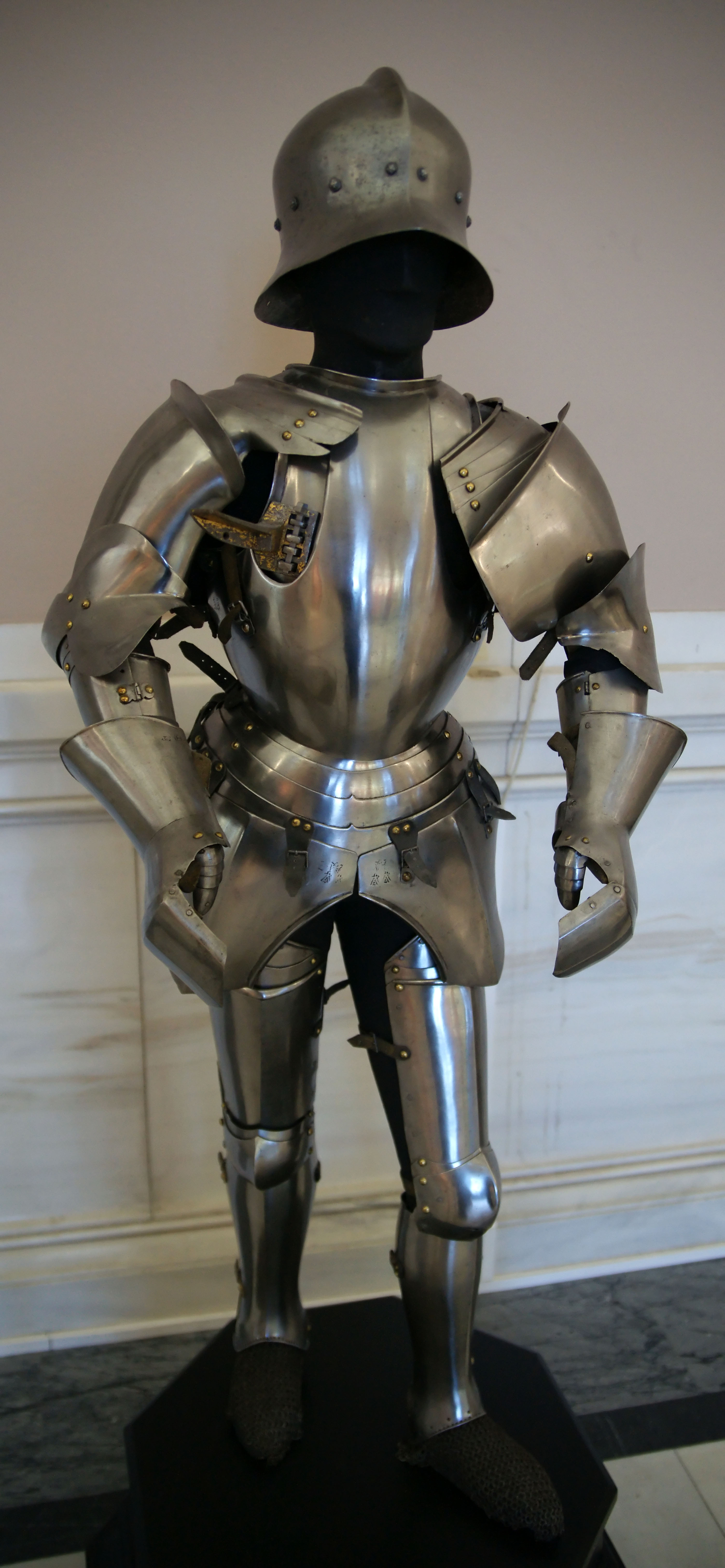
Suit of armor of the condottiero Roberto da Sanseverino, captured after his death at the Battle of Calliano (1487). However, the helmet is fake.

In his time as in the coming centuries, Roberto became famous for his military valor and strategic ability. Together and after Bartolomeo Colleoni was the first and most esteemed leader of the Italian peninsula, so much so that it was said that only after his death Alfonso of Aragon could rise to this podium.

He was shrewd, profiteering and proud, as well as - just like her son Fracasso - angry, fiery and impetuous: she often fell subject to violent attacks of anger in public; it is known when in 1466, in the garden of the Duchess of Calabria, he came to seriously insult the prince of Salerno, his namesake, for a dispute over some properties. He was stubborn and impatient, thirsty for honors.

Judging by his armor, now on display in the Kunsthistorisches Museum in Vienna, Roberto was of very short stature. Conversely, Aliprando Caprioli describes him as follows: "Roberto was tall, and strong; of white face, and of chestnut eyes and hair". Sigismondo de' Conti, who saw him in 1485, uses these words:

Roberto was pompously dressed and his advanced age did not deprive him of the strength to handle weapons and stand on the horse; his face presented all the majesty of a great captain.

— Sigismondo de' Conti, Storie de' suoi tempi

== Lineage ==
Roberto Sanseverino married at least twice and had numerous children, at least twenty-five or twenty-six, whose names are not all known. There is no reliable genealogy. In addition, the years of birth of children are usually unknown, so it is impossible to determine their order. Particularly controversial is the marriage with Elisabetta da Montefeltro, illegitimate daughter of Duke Federico of Urbino, dating back to 1462, which appears in various genealogies, while no evidence is found in the sources themselves. It can be assumed certain that Roberto married Giovanna da Correggio in 1447. The marriage lasted until her death in 1467 and produced numerous children, some of whom died young.

With a certain certainty they come from the first marriage with Giovanna da Correggio:

- Leonetto, eldest son, died as an infant in 1451.
- Gian Francesco (c. 1450 – 1501), leader in the service of the Duke of Milan and the King of France; he married firstly Diana della Ratta, of the Counts of Caserta. The second marriage was celebrated with Barbara Gonzaga in 1499;
- Sveva, married (c. 1465) Bernardo Anguissola di Piacenza (?–1476), Count of Montechiaro;
- Giulia (1454–1541), married Giovanni Tommaso Carafa (1457–1520), son of Diomedes, Count of Maddaloni and Cerreto;
- Gaspare (1455–1519), leader, called Fracasso for his impetuous nature, lord of Calvatone, Piadena and Spineda. He married Margaret Pius of Savoy;
- Galeazzo (1458–1525), condottiero, married Bianca Giovanna Sforza, then Elisabetta del Carretto of the Marquis of Finale;
- Antonio Maria (c. 1460 – 1509), condottiero, lord of Gualsinara in the Margraviate of Saluzzo;
- Federico (c. 1462 – 1516), cardinal;
- Ginevra, married (c. 1485) Lucio Malvezzi (1462–1511); Condottiero, since 1497 lord of the city of Borgolavezzaro, son of Lodovico Malvezzi of the branch of the Bolognese Malvezzi of the Ca 'grande.

In 1473, in his third marriage, he married the Sienese Lucrezia Malavolti, daughter of Angelo. From the latter he certainly had:

- Alexander (1474–1527), was initially a warrior, was later ordained a priest; In 1519 he was appointed non-resident bishop of Vienna;
- Hannibal.
- Giulio (c. 1475–1555), married Ippolita Pallavicino, only daughter of Giacomo Antonio Pallavicino, Margrave of Scipione, and Margherita Visconti;
- Daughter of unknown name, baptized in Venice in 1485;
- Stephen.

Although motherhood remains unclear, the following persons must also be considered as legitimate descendants of Roberto Sanseverino:

- Ludovica, married (c. 1473) to Francesco Maria Torelli, Count of Guastalla;
- Eleonora, married (1490) to Giovanni Adorno, lord of Poviglio. After the death of Giovanni Adorno, Eleonora was co-regent of the city of Sala near Alexandria. Their daughter Violante married Bernard I of Savoy, Margrave of Racconigi;
- Ippolita, married (c. 1495) to Cristoforo II Torelli, Count of Montechiarugolo;
- Francesca, married to Archembaud de Cholé, lord of the Joubardière of Palluau-sur-Indre;
- daughter of unknown name, married (1483) to Guido de' Rossi (c. 1440–1490); Count of San Secondo, Condottiero, was provisional leader of the Venetian troops in 1487 after the battle of Calliano and the death of Roberto Sanseverino;
- Ugo, married Flora Margherita Simonetta;
- Elizabeth;

He also had natural children:

- Giorgio (c. 1455 – †1507), known as Faccenda, condottiero. He began his military career in 1470. He changed camp at the beginning of July 1484 and joined Ludovico Sforza. In 1507 he was in Gazzuolo.
- Octavian (c. 1460 – †1510), had been a mercenary leader since the early 1480s, mostly in the service of the Duchy of Milan. In July 1484 he left the Venetian military camp with his troops and fought for Ludovico Sforza against his father. In 1499 he was entrusted with the defense of Valencia, which was captured and sacked by French troops through treason. Ottaviano Sanseverino was taken prisoner by the French. He married (around 1481) Luisa Gonfalonieri, daughter of Antonio Gonfalonieri, lord of Calendasco and bore the title of Lord of Ziano Piacentino Montalbo in Val di Tidone.

It is also necessary to calculate the existence of at least three other bastard sons with an unknown name, who followed their father to Rome in 1485, as evidenced by the Roman Diary, and two of whom died with him in 1487 in Calliano, as claimed by the Ferrarese chronicler Ugo Caleffini. Since both Giorgio (Faccenda) and Ottaviano had passed into the service of the Moor already in 1484, the two deceased sons and the third surviving - remembered in 1485 in Rome - are not theoretically identifiable with either one.

The Faccendino Sanseverino (c. 1486 – †1508) who in 1508 challenged the leader Mercurio Bua to a duel and was killed treasonously, it would not seem to be possible to be identified with Giorgio, as he is indicated as "nephew of Mr. Antonio Maria Sanseverino" and "young man of 22 years", therefore son of one of the brothers, and not of Roberto himself. He, according to the chronicler Ambrogio da Paullo, challenged Mercurio Bua to a duel to defend the honor of the Duke of Ferrara and the Marquis of Mantua, who had been insulted. Mercurio, knowing him as "a young expert and a strong man in arms" and doubting "not to lose his honor to fight with him", preferred to ambush him with 25 stradioti on the road from Melegnano to San Donato Milanese. They gave him more than thirty wounds, "so that the poor young man, as he came to defend the honor of the marquises and so his own, miserably remained dead." Mercury was reproached for having done so "out of cowardice more than anything else, unde was forced to flee with great scorn and shame [...] and so Facendino lost his life and Mercurio the conduct, as he had with the roy, and the honor".

== Bibliografia ==
- Mariano Welber (1987). La battaglia di Calliano 10 agosto 1487. Cronaca desunta dalle fonti narrative. Calliano.
- Clifford M. Brown; Paola Tosetti Grandi (ed.), I Gonzaga di Bozzolo, Mantova, 2011. ISBN 978-88-95490-11-3.
