= Calliano =

Calliano may refer to the following places in Italy:

- Calliano, Piedmont, a comune in the province of Asti, in the regio of Piedmont
- Calliano, Trentino, a comune in the province of Trentino, in the regio of Trentino-Alto Adige/Südtirol
  - Battle of Calliano (1487), fought between Venetian and Austrian forces
  - Battle of Calliano, fought 1796 between French and Austrian forces
