= Galeazzo Sanseverino =

Italian-French condottiere

Galeazzo da Sanseverino
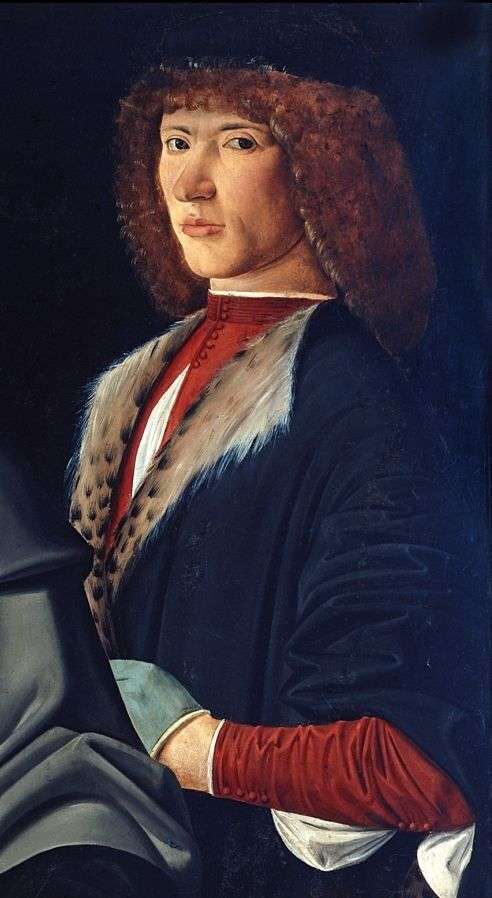
- Presumed portrait of Galeazzo Sanseverino in Portrait of Luca Pacioli, c. 1495
- Born: 1458-60 ca.
- Died: February 24, 1525; Battle of Pavia
- Spouses: Bianca Giovanna Sforza; Elisabetta Costanza del Carretto
- Military career
- Allegiance: Duchy of Milan, kingdom of France
- Service years: 1495–1525
- Rank: Grand écuyer de France
- Unit: cavalry
- Commands: Milanese army (1495–1500); French cavalry (1509–1525)
- Conflicts: Battle of Fornoue (1495); Battle of Agnadel (1509); Battle of Pavia (1525)
- Awards: knight of the Order of Saint Michael

Galeazzo da Sanseverino (French: Galéas de Saint-Séverin'), known as the son of Fortuna, (c. 1460 – 24 February 1525) was an Italian-French condottiere and Grand Écuyer de France; Marquis of Bobbio, Count of Caiazzo, Castel San Giovanni, Val Tidone and Voghera. He was first the favorite of Ludovico il Moro and Beatrice d'Este, then of Louis XII and Francis I of France, as well as a sworn enemy of Gian Giacomo Trivulzio.

On the other hand the Duke of Milan
called and gave the general cane
to Maria Galeazo, and captain
did it of his people on the saddle,
who riding then from hand to hand,
with the banner in the wind of the snake,
honor and glory of Lombardy,
with many great gentlemen in company.

— Gerolamo Senese, La venuta del Re Carlo con la rotta del Taro (1496-1497).

== Life ==
He was the third son of the famous leader Roberto Sanseverino, first Count of Caiazzo and Giovanna da Correggio. The date of birth is not at all clear, to be placed around 1458-60 and perhaps in Milan, where his mother Giovanna was certainly in the years 1458-59, waiting for the return of her husband from his pilgrimage to the Holy Land. It is not even known whether his brother Antonio Maria was born before or after, but certainly after his second son Gaspare, known as Fracasso, who was already married in 1475.

He made his first military experiences in the company of his father Roberto and in 1475 he obtained, together with his brothers, his first conduct in the pay of Florence.

=== At the service of Milan ===
In June 1483, during the Salt War, Galeazzo and his brother Gian Francesco deserted the Venetian conduct of their father Roberto and entered the service of the Duke of Bari, then Duke of Milan, Ludovico il Moro, despite the fact that his father was his bitter enemy. Shortly afterwards two of his half-brothers, Giorgio known as Faccenda and Ottaviano, also followed them. Two other brothers, Fracasso and Antonio Maria, remained faithful to their father, and only after Roberto's death, in 1489, they passed to Moro. The latter essentially gained in his service all the sons of the great enemy, esteemed among the best leaders of the peninsula.

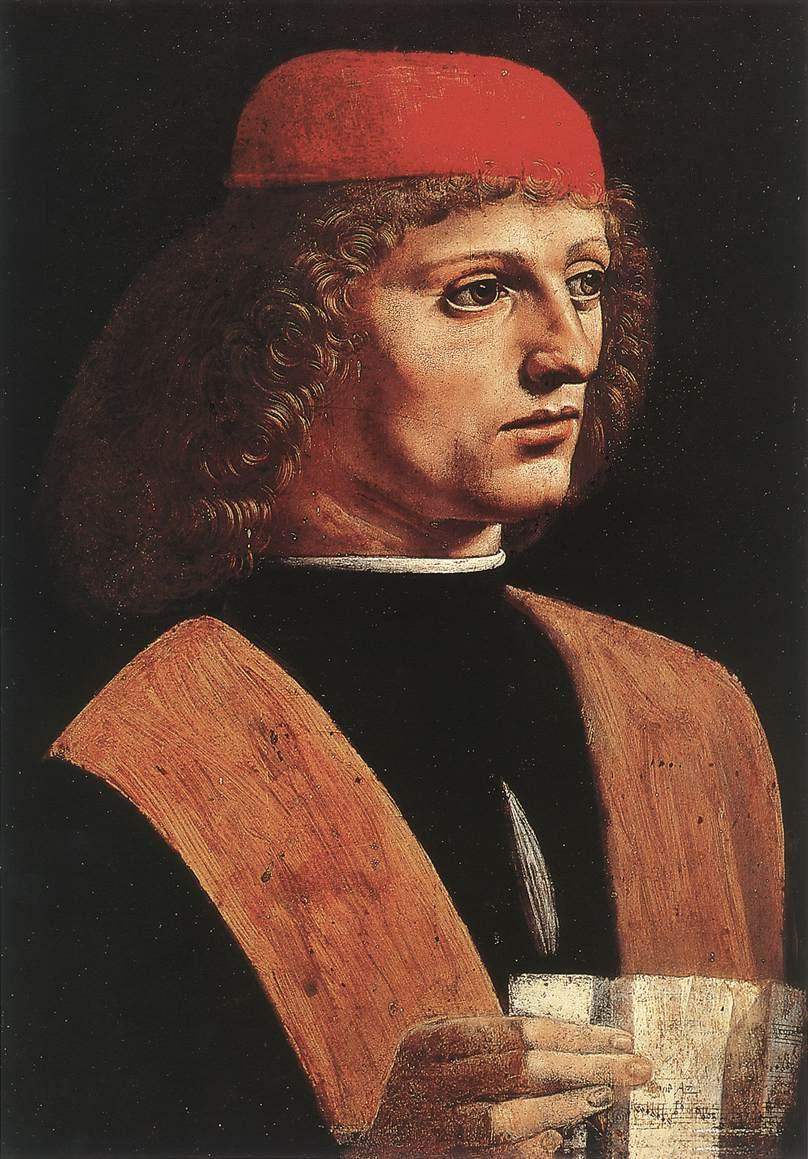
Possible portrait of Galeazzo Sanseverino in Portrait of a Musician by Leonardo da Vinci, Pinacoteca Ambrosiana, Milan, c. 1485.

==== Son-in-law del Moro ====
Galeazzo in particular immediately became the favorite of Ludovico, who certainly had to recognize his excellent courtesan qualities, and from this moment began for him a career in perpetual ascent, as well as to spread his fame. Of southern origins but without a homeland, the chronicler Andrea Prato alludes to him, when he reproaches Ludovico for his bad choices:

[...] He favored foreigners far more than his own; and some of those he loved with so much fervor that, in a short time, from less than mediocre he made them very rich [...]

— Giovanni Andrea Prato, Cronaca milanese

Already in 1486 King Ferrante of Aragon instructed his Milanese ambassador to greet Galeazzo on his part, telling him that he had heard "of his virtues, of his good bearings, and of the great affection that he brings us" and saying he was willing to gladly give him some benefit, if the opportunity had arisen.

In 1488 Galeazzo was sent to the rescue of Caterina Sforza barricaded in the Rocca di Ravaldino following the conspiracy of the Orsi. After liberating the city, returning to Milan, he was appointed captain general of the Sforza army. This prevarication attracted to him and Ludovico the relentless hatred of Gian Giacomo Trivulzio, and more generally the envy of the other brothers.

He also had a strong enmity with the Marquis of Mantua Francesco Gonzaga, always for the same reasons: the Milanese conduct of the Marquis, in fact, ended at the very beginning of 1489, shortly after Galeazzo had obtained the title of captain general. Floriano Dolfo probably alludes to the latter, in a letter full of vulgarity written in 1496, when he tells the Marquis Francesco to praise his decision, taken years earlier, to pass to the service of the Lordship of Venice, as a "cerse - that is, a genital organ - of a horse that spurs neither fears, nor lashes" had dissolved the parental bond that bound Francesco al Moro, being in fact the two brothers-in-law. Covered with benefits and often in charge of very delicate missions by the Moro, who trusted him blindly, in 1489 he married Ludovico's illegitimate daughter- legitimized for the occasion: Bianca Giovanna. The latter was at the time a seven-year-old girl, so the marriage was purely nominal, becoming effective only in 1496, when the girl turned fourteen. With the marriage he was invested with the possessions of the counties of Bobbio, Castel San Giovanni, Val Tidone and Voghera. In the same years he was given the castle of Mirabello.

If as a general he then proved unhappy, he was personally most valiant and esteemed the most righteous jouster and the most tasky knight of the court: handsome of the person, like his other three brothers in the service of the Moor, he was certainly such as to please the princely bride, even almost a child.

— Achille Dina, Isabella d'Aragona Duchessa di Milano e di Bari.

=== The new duchess ===
When in 1491, after ten years of engagement, Ludovico finally decided to take Beatrice d'Este as his wife, Galeazzo knew with his affability and his natural charm to earn the favor of the new duchess, becoming his most faithful servant in perpetuity. Not infrequently they are found together in the daily entertainment of the court, as well as in matters of greater importance.

Thus, for example, in 1491, Beatrice wrote to her sister: "every day the illustrious Messer Galeazzo and I, with some other of these courtiers, take pleasure in the game of ball at the mallet after lunch".

«Beatrice immediately began a life of violent entertainment mostly in the company of the very elegant Galeazzo Sanseverino, spending February and March in sometimes risky hunts and games in the surrounding castles.» (Achille Dina, Isabella of Aragon Duchess of Milan and Bari.)

==== The uncertainty of the name ====
In his letters Galeazzo used to sign himself with the triple surname Sfortia Vicecomes de Sancto Severino, or because through his marriage with Bianca Giovanna he had been "adopted" within the Sforza family or because of his descent from Muzio Attendolo.

A series of letters written in this period to the Marquise Isabella d'Este contain a curious and interminable dispute about who was the best paladin: Orlando or Rinaldo, as well as the story of a trip made by Beatrice d'Este to Cusago and the many amusements of the new duchess. These letters, however, contain only the signature Galeaz Sfortia Vicecomes armorum capitaneus appears.

This generated some confusion among historians, since there was at least one other Galeazzo Visconti his contemporary, also called "messer Vesconte", also a courtier friend of the dukes, who figures as podestà of Annone in 1484, advisor to Duke Gian Galeazzo, invested by the latter in 1488 of the county of Busto Arsizio, ambassador to Charles VIII in 1492 and military commissar of Duke Ludovico in 1495; after the expulsion of the Moro he also passed to the French side.

The name appears several times in the chronicles and letters and it is not possible to establish whether it was always the same person or different, nor above all if it corresponds to the homonymous court poet Galeazzo Visconti. The uncertainty lies in the variability of the names with which at the time it was possible to indicate the same person: Ludovico Sforza himself is sometimes mentioned as "Ludovico Vesconte" and it was not mandatory in the letters to sign with the full surname. However, it is clear that Galeazzo Sanseverino and Galeazzo Visconti were not the same person, as they were mentioned separately in the same context. Doubts remain about the identity of the sender of the letters to the Marquise, however it does not appear that this Galeazzo Visconti also bore the surname Sfortia, also the references in them to the days of leisure spent in the company of the two sisters d'Este and to the great familiarity with the Duchess Beatrice, as well as to a brother named "Gasparo" who could correspond to Fracasso, led to a belief that the sender was in fact Galeazzo Sanseverino.

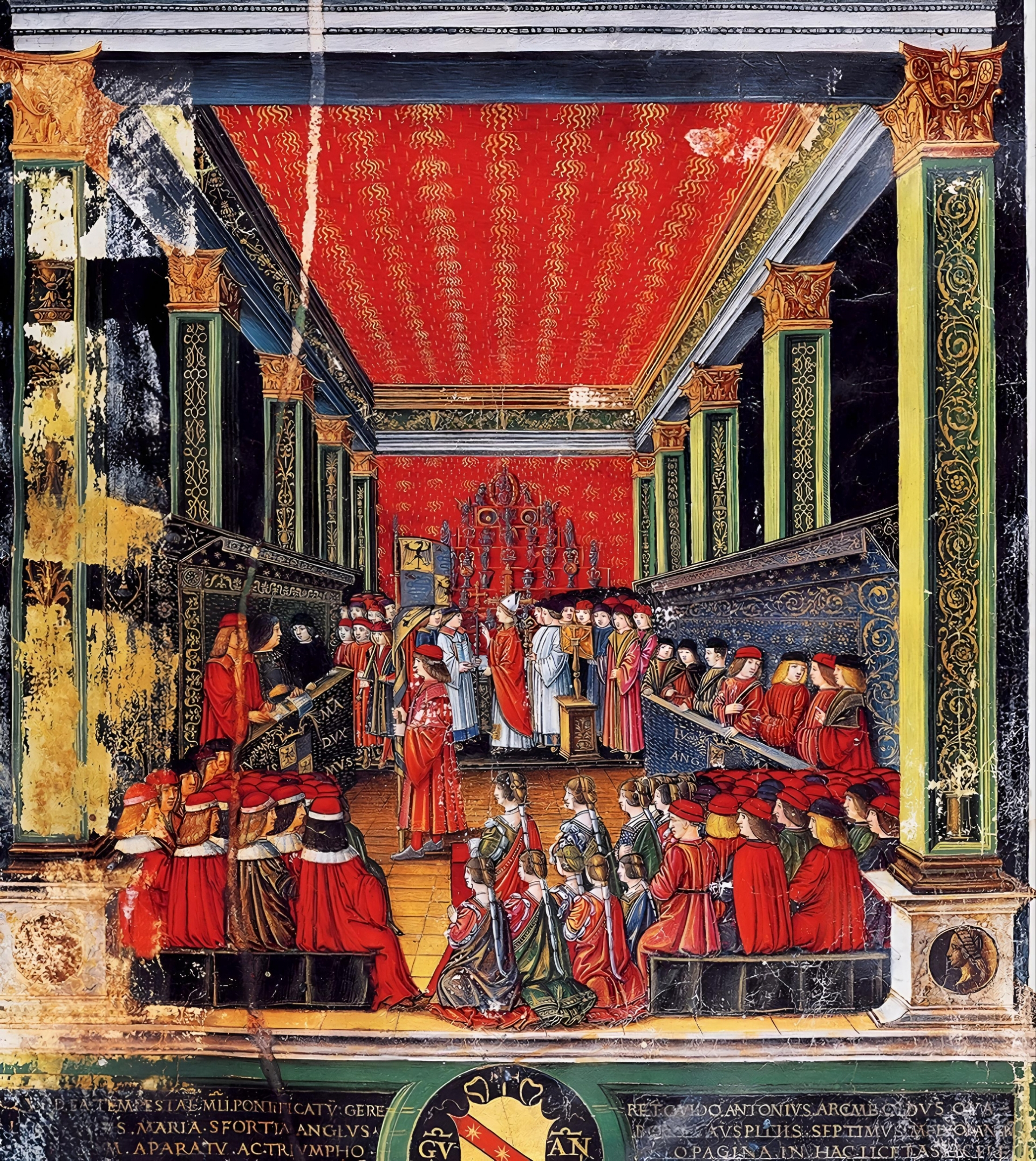
Portrait of Galeazzo at the center of the scene of the ducal investiture of Ludovico il Moro, illuminated page by the Missal Arcimboldi in the Chapter Library of the Duomo of Milan.

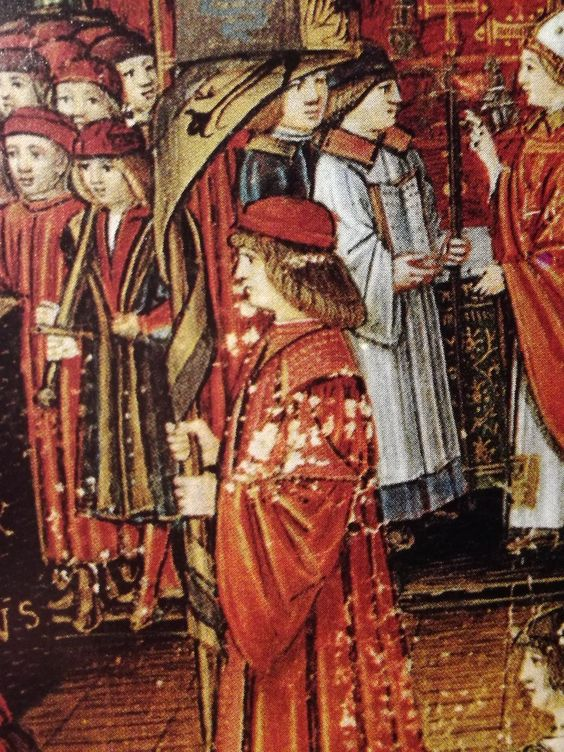
It is known that during the ceremony Ludovico received, among other things, a small red banner, which he threw to the people; a sword unsheathed, which gave his nephew the count of Melzo (the blond figure on the left, with the sword resting on his shoulder); as well as a large golden banner with the black eagle, which he gave to his son-in-law Galeazzo.

He tells of having accompanied the Duchess Beatrice on holiday in Cusago and being mounted with her in a cart, where during the journey they sang more than twenty-five songs, "doing a lot of crazy things", then fished, hunted and played ball with many other amusements, returning to Milan after sunset, so much so that - he adds jokingly - in the star behind Beatrice he had almost gone crazy:

We returned to Milan an hour after sunset and presented the whole hunt to the illustrious Lord my Duke of Bari, who took so much pleasure in it that more could not be said, much more than if he had been there in person, and I believe that my Duchess will have made a greater profit than I, because I believe that the illustrious Lord Ludovico will give him Cusago [...] but I have broken my boots and, as I said above, I have gone mad, and these it is the earnings that are made to serve women [...] nevertheless I will have patience, making it successful for my Duchess, to whom I promised not to lack in anything until death.

— Galeazzo's letter to Isabella d'Este, 11 February 1491.

He also enjoyed the rare privilege of free access to the ducal apartments, if at the end of the letter he reminds the Marquise Isabella of those times when, entering Beatrice's private dressing room, he found the ladies still undressed and intent on styling their hair:

My Madonna Marquise, I just can't forget our life in the evening, and her sweet company, and so I also go to Madama's dressing room, thinking I will find her combing her hair and next to her His Lordship, Theodora [Angelini] and Beatrice [dei Contrari] in shirt sleeves, and with her Violante [de 'Preti] and Maria also undressed, and when I can't find her, I feel sad.

— Galeazzo Sanseverino to Isabella d'Este

==== Son of Fortune ====
There was no meeting, public or private, at which Galeazzo was not present. He was a participant in all the secrets of the ducal family and, as long as he lived in Milan, he kept in the castle almost a court of his own. In the regency committee, composed of only three members, which - in the event of Ludovico's sudden death - would take over the government, he was in second place immediately after Duchess Beatrice and immediately before Cardinal Ascanio, Moro's brother.

As proof of the very close relationships existing between the three, consider that, in the period of mourning for the death of her mother, Beatrice used to eat meals with the sole company of her husband and son-in-law Galeazzo, and that the latter was very close to her even when, in 1492, a sudden attack of malarial fevers put her first pregnancy at risk.

It seems to me that this Messer Galeazzo is Duke of Milan because he can do what he wants and has what he knows how to ask and desire.

— Ambassador Giacomo Trotti, letter to duke of Ferrara, 7 August 1492.

For the exceptional social climb that, from Roberto's unknown son, had led him to be almost a second duke in Milan, Galeazzo was called "the son of Fortune". Philippe de Commines in his Memoirs justifies the fact by saying that Ludovico "kept him as a son, as he did not yet have any adults".

On the other hand, a link of a sexual nature should not be excluded, if - as Achille Dina, a twentieth-century historian, recalled - this was referred to by that accusation of Francesco Guicciardini, who said of Ludovico: "he was dishonest in the sin of sodomy and, as many say, still as an old man no less patient than agent".

Achille Dina, however, insists on the strong "intimacy" that Galeazzo had rather with the Duchess Beatrice and insinuates that the two were lovers, arguing that "some intimate remorse" was due to her deep sorrow for the death of her stepdaughter:

She, who was expecting the birth of another child, went every day to the church of S. Maria delle Grazie, staying there for long hours to pray and cry over Bianca's tomb. Pain from the recent loss? or for Ludovico's relationship with Crivelli? asks her biographer. Or some intimate remorse, which would increase her apprehension about the neighbor I'm leaving? [...] Perhaps her conduct towards Isabella? or something in her relations with Bianca's husband, the charming Galeazzo Sanseverino, whose intrinsic nature and continuous sharing of pleasures with her cannot fail to strike? "

— Achille Dina, Isabella d'Aragona Duchessa di Milano e di Bari.

Although it is true that Beatrice wanted him next to her wherever she went and that, a bit like everyone, she probably suffered the fascination, however, none of the contemporaries insinuated any suspicious behavior between the two, and Beatrice demonstrated on several occasions to be "in superlative shameful" and, if not directly in love, at least fond of her husband, as well as praised for his "modest mind". She was also herself to inform her family of the amusements taken with Galeazzo, and none of this would have been possible without the consent of Ludovico, who had gladly encouraged him. More easily one would look at their relationship as the classic one between knight and lady, as his biographer interprets it and as Galeazzo himself declares in one of his letters, referring to his eternal and absolute servitude to Beatrice. He represents in some ways the forerunner of the cavalier servant, a figure that would arise only three centuries later. A sexual metaphor could in fact be read in a passage by Sanudo, who in 1499 wrote:

[...] Signor Galeazo di Sanseverino enjoyed little reputation on the part of the soldiers, nor was he loved because he was not worthy in government, however he was worthy of his spear.

— Marin Sanudo il giovane, I diarii di Marino Sanuto, 1496-1533

Antonio Perria instead hypothesizes a relationship with Duke Gian Galeazzo, because at the end of 1492 a scandal broke out for which Isabella of Aragon had tried to spread poison to this Rozone, favorite and lover of her husband Gian Galeazzo, as well as to Galeazzo Sanseverino himself. It is not known why, but it was probably out of jealousy of her husband. King Ferrante, informed on the matter, replied that it was impossible that Isabella had tried to poison Galeazzo, who was "loved by them as a son and always proved to be a good servant and relative"; as for Rozone, he said he was surprised that his niece "out of desperation" had not done worse.

But Isabella's retaliation against Galeazzo was perhaps due to the fact that he favored the duke in his betrayals, as did Ludovico who, rather than expelling Rozone from the state, granted him favors and attributions to please his nephew, in such a way that he had become "the first man he had beside him".

[...] the illustrious Galeazzo Sanseverino, the very elegant Sforza captain general and, despite appearances, opposed to Isabella due to his ancient hatred family, as well as for his intimacy with Beatrice and with Moro, so great that, says Guicciardini, "in his bosom all the secrets and all the resolutions of Ludovico Sforza were confined

— Achille Dina, Isabella d'Aragona Duchessa di Milano e di Bari.

Sanudo assures us, while he was in Alessandria in 1499 Galeazzo took care, more than the army, of dressing elegantly and having fun with women: "this Signor Galeazzo is in Alessandria, waiting for dresses and ladies, it is said hurt him, and he was at odds with lord Alessandro Sforza".

=== The first descent of the French in Italy ===
In 1494 he was sent by the Moor to Lyon on a diplomatic visit to Charles VIII, to prove the king's intentions in the enterprise of the kingdom of Naples. Charles VIII gave him his lovers and wanted to create him knight of the Order of St. Michael. He was an esteemed friend of Pacioli, he knew Latin, French and German.

Ludovico, at first aligned with the French, later changed alliances, siding with the Holy League that had formed to drive the invaders from the peninsula.

During 1495 Galeazzo led the Milanese army - always as captain general of the Sforza armies - against the King of France and the Duke of Orleans, who last in June had seized Novara and threatened to besiege Milan itself. Since Galeazzo was sluggish, and there were rumors that his brother Fracasso was playing a double game with the king of France, Beatrice herself went to the military camp to urge him to move against the enemy.

On July 6, 1495, he took part – again as captain general of the Sforza armies – in the epochal battle of Fornovo against the French who had invaded the Italian peninsula and was the only one who together with his brothers with the cavalrymen pursued the fugitives beyond the Taro river in an attempt to prevent them from continuing the march towards Lombardy, while the rest of the soldiers of the Holy League gave themselves to the looting of the camp French.

=== Death of Bianca Giovanna ===
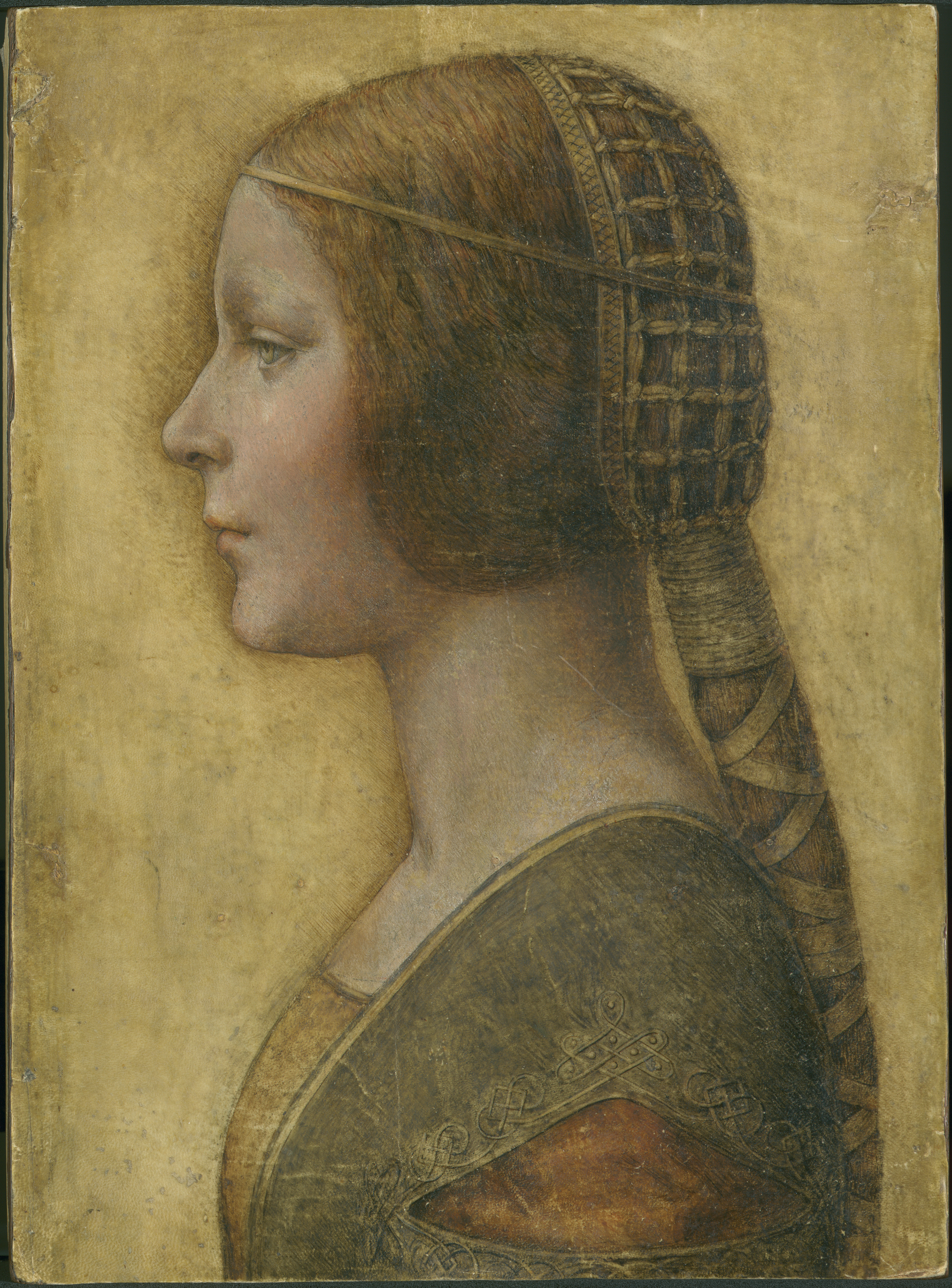
The beautiful princess by Leonardo da Vinci, alleged portrait of Bianca Giovanna Sforza.

On November 23, 1496, a few months after the transductio ad maritum, the young Bianca Giovanna died of a "stomach disease", or according to some for poisoning perpetrated by a certain Francesca Dal Verme, a woman who fiercely hated the Moro for personal reasons. Galeazzo was deeply saddened by it and remained locked up for many days in certain damp rooms of the castle of Milan that harmed his health, already debilitated by a recent illness.

Some courtiers of Ludovico, namely the castellan Bernardino da Corte, the first secretary Bartolomeo Calco and the Archbishop of Milan, very worried about his approval, then went to visit him and found him "so shocked and dejected [...] full of tears and sobs so that he could hardly express the words of pain". A few days later they returned together with the bishop of Piacenza to convince Galeazzo to join his father-in-law Ludovico in Pavia, who in those days had to go to Parma to welcome the emperor Maximilian, since he had the desire to have his son-in-law with him in order to comfort each other, but Galeazzo refused saying that he was not able to leave the room for the greatness of his pain, and that if Ludovico had ordered it then he would have gone to him "with the tongue on the ground", a blatant act of penance. However, Bernardino da Corte managed to persuade him to leave the room to move to the healthiest country residence in Abbiategrasso so that he would not get sick.

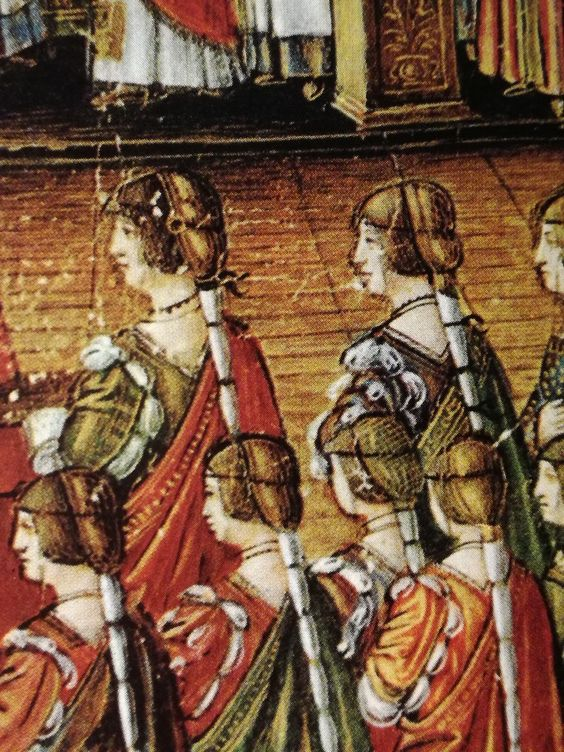
Possible portrait of Bianca Giovanna Sforza (the blonde girl in profile on the right), next to the Duchess Beatrice d'Este (on the left), in the miniature of ludovico's investiture ceremony.

The death appeared suspicious, especially since the cause was not known, and that the young woman had been tormented several times in recent months by fevers and stomach pains. Since it was followed, a little more than a month later, by the death of The Duchess Beatrice herself, the historian Ludovico Antonio Muratori in his Estensi Antiquities, hints at the possibility that Bianca had fallen victim to a court intrigue:

Another [rumor] adds, having been Beatrice poisoned by Francesca dal Verme at the request of Galeazzo Sanseverino, just as Francesca after a few years confessed while dying. The reason for this is not said, being able only to observe, that as a certificate of this Corio had died shortly before Bianca, bastard of this Duke Lodovico, and wife of the aforementioned Galeazzo. But since rumors of the vulgar enter easily into these facts, I do not vouch for any of these secret news.

— Ludovico Muratori, Antichità Estensi

The passage, somewhat vague, received different interpretations over time. According to some, the Muratori overshadowed a murder by Beatrice's father, who would have poisoned his stepdaughter in revenge against Galeazzo, who offered his palace to the secret meetings between Ludovico and Lucrezia Crivelli, so that he would have taken revenge in the same way. This seems completely far-fetched, considering the intense affection that bound Beatrice to Bianca Giovanna, who claimed to have next to her at all times. In the same way it is not clear what reason Galeazzo could have had for wanting the death of his duchess, thus seriously damaging his father-in-law and the state. He himself had been ill with fevers in recent months.

Significant is finally the great pain that he showed for the loss of Beatrice: the Este ambassador Antonio Costabili, in describing to Duke Ercole the manifestations of mourning at the funeral of his daughter, showed himself particularly struck by the behavior of Galeazzo, who "in demonstrations, words and deeds did wondrous things as testimony to the affection he bore to her, extending himself to make known to everyone the virtues and goodness that reigned in that Most Illustrious Madonna".

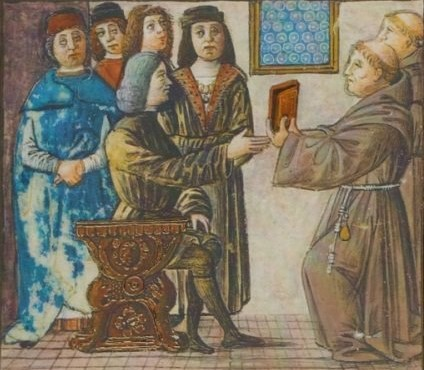
Fra' Luca Pacioli presents De Divina Proportione to the Duke (1498). The man next to Ludovico, also grieving, is perhaps his son-in-law Galeazzo, recognizable by what seems to be the necklace of the order of St. Michael. Both seem to have maintained mourning even after the expiration of the canonical year.

More likely, the Muratori wanted to imply that if the two young women met such a premature death within a month, evidently someone was looking for the ruin of the Moro, who in fact after the death of his wife was no longer able to take care of the state. The mysterious Francesca dal Verme would however be an illegitimate daughter of Count Pietro dal Verme, a man who said he was poisoned by his wife Chiara Sforza on commission of the Moro, who took over the possessions at the expense of the count's children just to make a gift to the favorite Galeazzo. Bianca Giovanna, until then healthy, began to suffer from illness immediately after going to the counties of Bobbio and Voghera, where it was likely that she still lived aforementioned Francesca.

In 1498 he married again with Elisabetta Costanza del Carretto, called Madama la Grande, daughter of the Marquis del Finale, who was at the time a child and with whom he had no children.

=== The second fall of the French ===
Galeazzo fell prisoner of the French, together with his lord Ludovico Sforza, after the battle of Novara (1500), where, hit by a stone, he was wounded in the face. The valiant bearing of Galeazzo during this fateful battle was described by the Venetian Ercole Cinzio Rinucci in one of his compositions in octaves.

Marin Sanudo comments in this regard: "Trivulzio, seeing these prisoners, and above all Signor Lodovico, thinks, oh reader, what joy!!"

Immediately, having led the duke to his presence, Gian Giacomo addressed to him - according to Andrea Prato - these contemptuous words:

"Now are you here, Ludovico Sforza, who for the sake of a foreigner Galeazzo Sanseverino have chased me your citizen out, nor, if you have chased me away only one, have you again urged the souls of the Milanese to rebel against the royal Majesty?" '
To which thing, answering in a low manner, the prince said, that it is difficult to know the cause why the soul bends to love one and hates the other [...]

— Cronaca di Giovan Andrea Prato

Unlike Sforza, behind the mediation of his brother Cardinal Federico and after the payment of a ransom paid by his brothers, he was released only a few months after his capture. He lost the counties and lordships of Bobbio, Castel San Giovanni, Val Tidone and Voghera reassigned by the French.

After these nefarious events he went to Innsbruck to the court of Emperor Maximilian I, here the chronicles tell him sad melancholic, poor, little considered and always dressed in black as a sign of pain for the fate of his father-in-law. Marin Sanudo adds that he had stopped cutting his hair, which had become length to the waist, and wore it dyed the same black. Then he went to Nuremberg, where thanks to his mutual friend Willibald Pirckheimer he befriended Albrecht Dürer, who portrayed him in black dress in 1503.

In the same year, probably, he challenged the Marquis Francesco Gonzaga to a duel for their ancient enmity. Francesco did not accept the duel, but responded with a long letter full of insults and vulgarity, in which he essentially accused Galeazzo of being a recommended without art or part, of having always lived at the expense of others, without enjoying anything of his own, opposing him instead his own noble and deserved hereditary condition. He also accuses him of having been only the ruin of Ludovico Sforza, who "does not find himself hora fora of the kingdom he possesses captivated" if it had not been for his own cause, and of having earned everything he possesses only by prostituting himself, moreover through passive sodomy, while Francis proudly boasts of having practiced exclusively active sodomy. Among other things, he claims his military qualities and the merits acquired with weapons, reminding him vice versa of his shortcomings in this discipline, for which he accuses him of having been the cause of the ruin of all Italy:

Prù! (this is a fart sound that I made with my mouth, with the addition of a manichetto and a hand that closes the thumb with the first two fingers). Oh, Galeazzo, for my advice, worry about living content with that little fortune which by grace, without any merit, has casually left you the sad condition of the times [...]. I was born in the Lordship and Lord and Marquis of Mantua, most noble city, and in that I am kept Lord until this hour by the grace of God and my good bearing. You as a gypsy have been in a begotten place, in another born and educated elsewhere, without any domain or territory, and even if luck has graciously granted you some happy following, you have lost it for your lack, so that now [ ...] you have to live like dogs do, at the expense of others [...]. You, wretched, cannot live if you do not find someone who, not knowing you, wants to throw away the stuff, the time and the service. [...] I am reputed and raised by nobility of birth and good morals; you for human and ass favors (and I usually have a party at the door of others, and not at mine!) I in military art - as is well known - I have carried myself in such a way that I have always come out with victory and popular throughout Italy. You, on the contrary, every time you made the war you came out or defeated or driven out, although you were against the enemy with a greater and much stronger army, when like a rabbit you fled from it, and you were the infamy, the ruin and destruction of the beautiful Italian dominion!

He goes on to say that, even accepting the duel and winning, he would not bring back any glory, except that of having won "a prostitute, a female of ill repute, miserable, brazen and fugitive!"; conversely, if Galeazzo turns out to be the victor "by misfortune [...] or by the fury of the heavens", he would obtain much greater gain than he. However, it appears clear from this that Francesco did not want to face him in a duel fearing to be defeated, and that the resentment was still alive in him for having seen himself repeatedly undermined by Galeazzo in the conduct with the Moro. Francesco also commits the mistake, in order to insult the enemy, of offending even the memory of his father Roberto, saying that he was "with little praise led to death", and putting his father Federico before him, when in truth the majority of historians and chroniclers agree in saying that Roberto Sanseverino died fighting valiantly and with honor, and was undoubtedly esteemed the first and most experienced among the Italian leaders of his time, a record that certainly did not belong to Federico Gonzaga. Francesco does not even recognize the merits of Galeazzo during the battle of Fornovo, and accuses him of having "cast out and persecuted as enemies" his own brothers, and of having turned his back on him, when in truth it appears from the sources that several times Galeazzo had acted as a peacemaker between his brothers and Ludovico il Moro, making them regain the conduct and possessions they had lost after leaving. A series of accusations, therefore, exaggerated and partially false, dictated by a visibly envious soul, which even blames Galeazzo for having made him lose his conduct with the Lordship of Venice in 1497, when this actually happened due to ambiguous behavior of Francesco himself, as well as to put him in a bad light with the emperor Maximilian I.

=== In the service of France ===
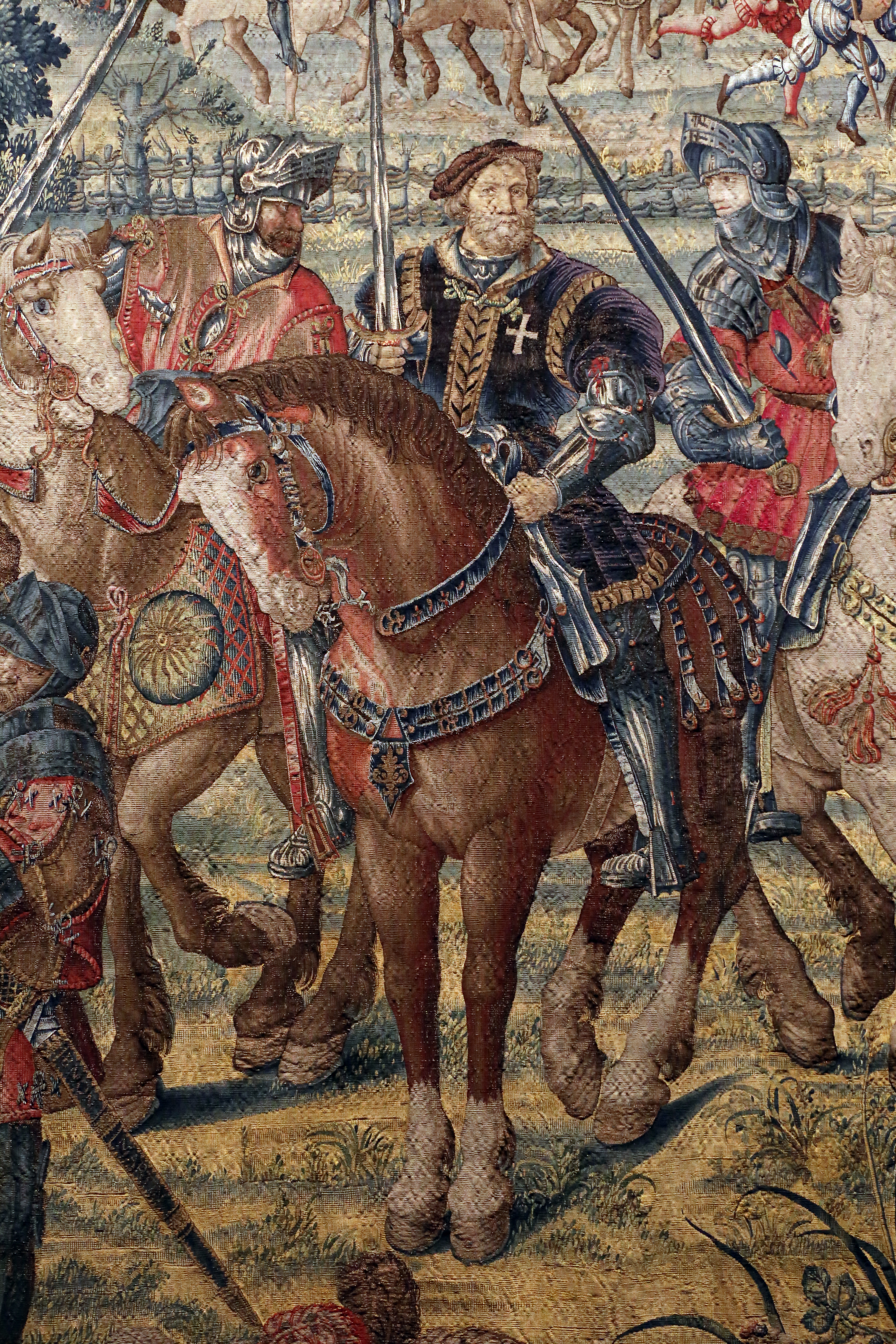
Alleged portrait of Galeazzo at the age of 66 during the Battle of Pavia, in the scene of the capture of King Francis I. Tapestries of the Battle of Pavia,1528-1531.

Thanks to the intervention of his brothers and Cardinal Federico Sanseverino, in 1504 he reconciled with Louis XII of France and followed him to Naples, receiving the rank of councilor of state, chamberlain of the king and grand écuyer de France. No Italian, indeed no foreigner, neither before nor after him received this honor. In 1505 he was given the castle of Mehun-sur-Yèvre. Because of this, the hatred of Gian Giacomo Trivulzio, now Marshal of France, towards him grew fiercely, as Galeazzo, who had first stripped him of Ludovico's favors, now stripped him of those of the king.

His numerous attempts to mediate with King Louis XII the release of his friend and father-in-law Ludovico Sforza, who died a prisoner in Loches in 1508, were in vain. In Leonardo's last years spent in Amboise, Galeazzo Sanseverino was still close to his old friend with whom he shared pleasant memories of the Milanese time.

In 1516 the King of France granted him again Bobbio and all the fiefs, and with a second diploma he was also created Marquis of Bobbio. The marquisate of Bobbio was formed by the counties of Bobbio and Voghera, by the Malaspinian lordships of Oltrepò and Varzi and by the county of Tortona (together with the Bishopric). The restitution took place following the new expulsion of the Dal Verme counts, but did not regain the lordships of Castel San Giovanni and Val Tidone, already assigned by the French in 1504 to the Pallavicino, becoming the Piacenza territory and later passing to the Farnese.

In 1517 Galeazzo won a lawsuit against his enemy Jacques de Trivulce, Marshal of France, regaining his properties in Milan which Trivulce had confiscated. The Trivulce, who therefore came into conflict with the king of France, even died of indignation.

He accompanied Francis I of France on his encounter with Henry VIII of England at Calais in 1520. He was made count of Martigues in 1522. In the service of France, Galeazzo campaigned in the Italian Wars from 1509 until his death.

=== Death ===
He died in 1525 during the famous Battle of Pavia, while attempting to defend King Francis I from capture, where the French cavalry was decimated by a force of 1,500 Basque arquebusiers. The day after the battle, his body was taken by his people to the Certosa di Pavia and, buried there, his tomb was never found.

King Francis I, still a prisoner at the Charterthus, mourned his dear friend who will never forget, later no Italian will ever hold the office of Grand Ecuyer of the king. Willibald Pirckheimer at the end of 1525 in a letter to Albrecht Dürer recalls Galeazzo Sanseverino, a close friend in common and mourns his death. His widow, Elisabetta Costanza del Carretto, retired to Piacenza, where she died in her palace on 3 January 1564.

Crescenzi claimed that Galeazzo had a daughter named Anna, but this according to other historians is to be excluded, as Galeazzo did not leave succession and his fiefs returned to the Dal Verme. His half-brother Giulio, in an attempt to recover them, filed a lawsuit against them, but without success.

== Appearance and personality ==
Galeazzo was a good-looking man, unbeatable champion of the rides, loved by women not only for his charm, elegance and well-groomed physique, but also for his culture and way of speaking; he knew Latin, French and German. His reputation as a perfect courtier ran throughout Italy. He was educated by masters of arms and the scholar Pietro del Monte.

Baldassare Castiglione also in his book Il Cortegiano cites Galeazzo Sanseverino as an example of a perfect nobleman, and it is also said that Michelangelo was inspired by him when he sculpted his famous David.

And among the men we know today, consider how well and gracefully Signor Galeazzo Sanseverino, great squire of France, does all the exercises of the body; and this because, in addition to the natural disposition that he has for the person, he has made every effort to learn from good teachers and always have excellent men with him and from each take the best of what they knew.

— Baldassarre Castiglione, Il Cortegiano.

It is not clear what his natural hair color was, since from a letter from Isabella d'Este we learn that sometimes he used to dye them black, as did other men in Milan. This was unusual for the time, where blond hair was fashionable. Judging by the letter, however, it was a non-permanent dye, indeed with a very limited duration, as Isabella recalls "having seen Count Francesco Sforza one day with black hair and the other with his naturals".

Although, as Rosmini would later say, among all the Sanseverino brothers he was "the least experienced in arms and military art the least learned", he could still count courage and fidelity among his virtues, and, to be most loved by Duke Ludovico and Duchess Beatrice, he had the title of captain general of the Sforza militias and kept it until the end. "Old man but worthy" says Johannes Agazzari on the occasion of the battle of Pavia.

Messer Galeazzo Sanseverino, who was a beautiful jouster, but for cowardice and little experience in the military art not at all capable of leading a military camp.

— Francesco Guicciardini, Storie Fiorentine dal 1378 al 1509.

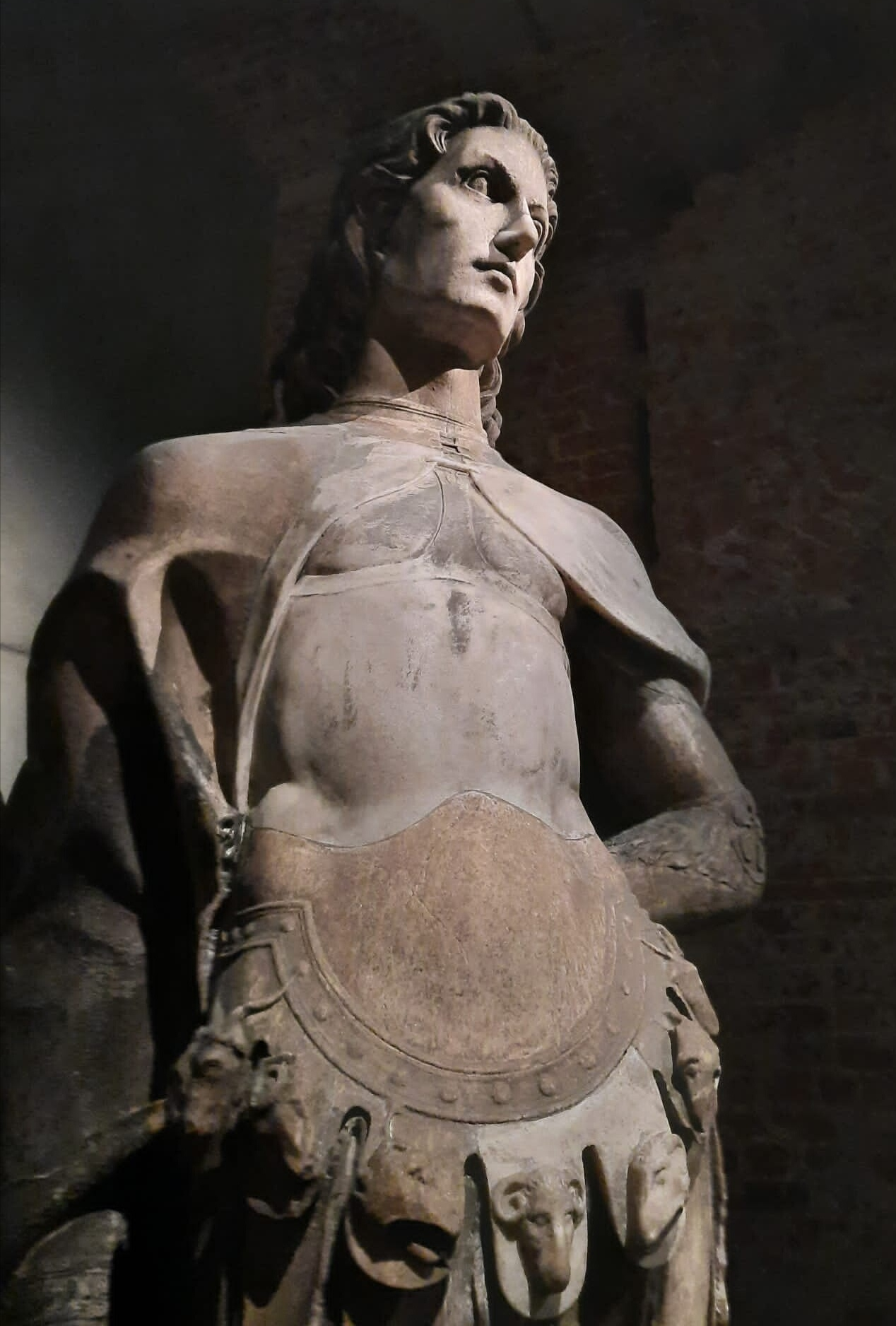
Probable portrait of Galeazzo in the guise of San Vittore il Moro.

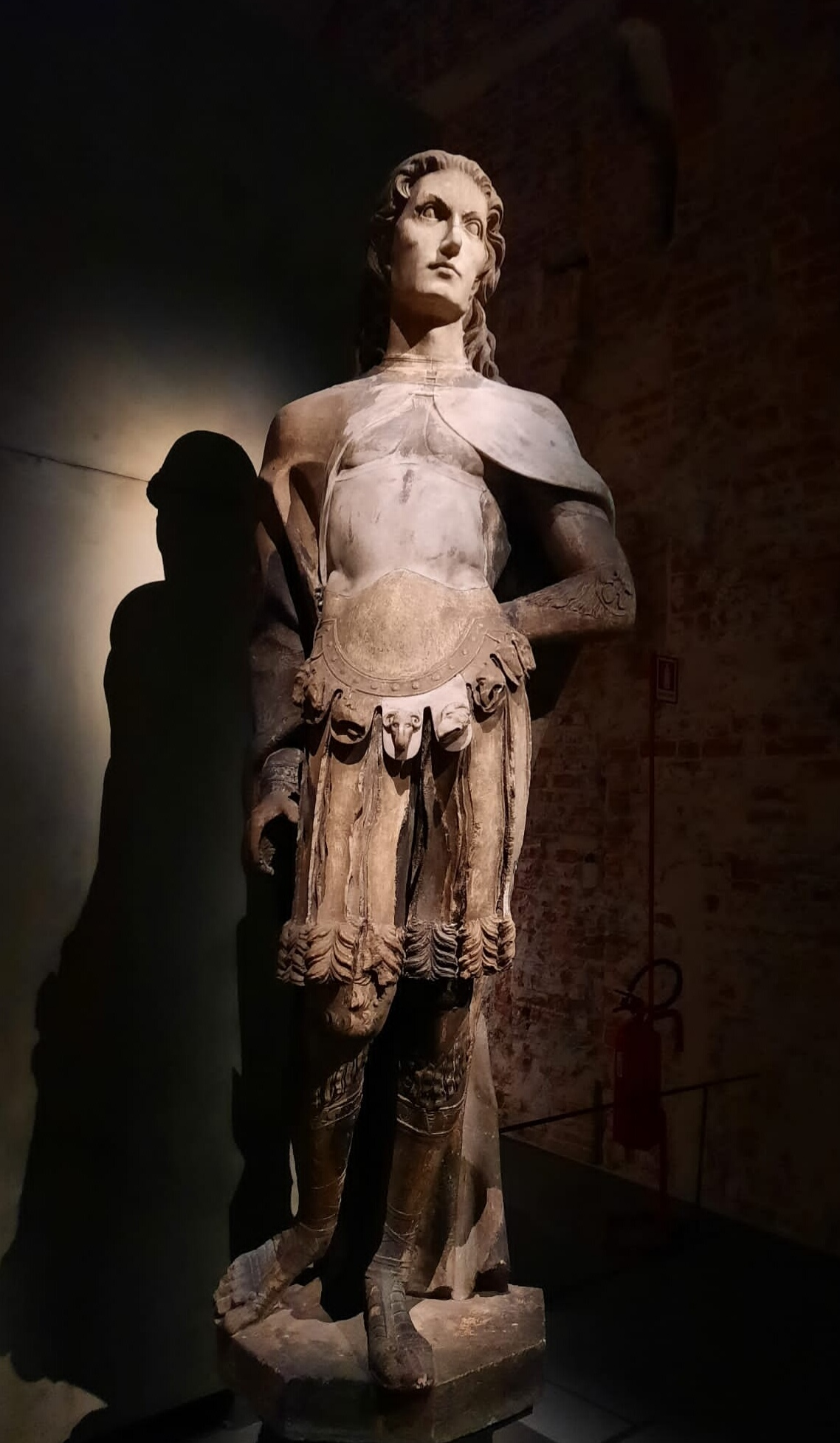
Statue in the collection of the Great Museum of the Duomo of Milan, late fifteenth century.

Galeaz de San Severino, smooth talker, skilful in hunting and body exercises, fine courtier, who did not hesitate to undress to play ball with the king [Charles VIII].

— François Tommy Perrens, Histoire de Florence depuis la domination des Médicis jusqu'à la chute de la république (1434-1531).

He was persuasive, elegant in his language as well as in his habits, expert in matters of war, and passed for the most skilful joust that could be seen.

— Conte Henri François Delaborde, L'expédition de Charles VIII en Italie histoire diplomatique et militaire (1888).

== Portraits ==
A portrait of him is found in an incunabulum of the Divine Comedy edited by the Franciscan Pietro da Figino and illuminated by Antonio Grifo, at folio 271 v. The original is kept in the library of Dante's House in Rome.

Two of his possible portraits are the so-called Portrait of a Musician by Leonardo da Vinci and "the pupil" in the Portrait of Luca Pacioli, in which recurring elements are noted, such as the thick curly hair and the central slit of the farsetto in the form of a spear. The identification is also based on comparison with the known portraits of his father Roberto, whose facial features show traits in common. In the first case, the identification had already been proposed at the end of the 19th century by German scholars such as Muller-Walde, having perhaps more familiarity with the features of Roberto, whose tombstone can be found in the Cathedral of Trento. In support of this thesis, Piero Misciatelli recalls that Galeazzo was in fact a great friend and protector of Leonardo, who frequented his home in Milan, and fra' Luca Pacioli and that, just like Ludovico and Beatrice, he must certainly have been passionate about music. Others, like Robert de la Sizèranne, also recognized the traits of their father Roberto.

Of little value from the physiognomic point of view is the miniature of the Missal Arcimboldi, which depicts him during the investiture of his father-in-law, however it constitutes a completely certain portrait thanks to the banner that we know he received from his father-in-law.

The so-called Profile of an Ancient Captain by Leonardo da Vinci deserves a special mention, depicting a helmet very similar to that worn by Galeazzo during the joust held on the occasion of the wedding between Ludovico il Moro and Beatrice d'Este in 1491: "He wore a golden helmet all blond, but at the same time such as to instill fear, on the top of which a pair of twisted horns shone [...] from the helmet a large winged snake protruding from its tail and paws covered the back of the horse". Since Galeazzo had entrusted Leonardo with the creation of wild costumes for himself and his men to be worn on the occasion of the aforementioned joust, some critics have hypothesized that it was a portrait of him, which in this case would probably be a caricature; however some marble bas-reliefs, attributed to Verrocchio's workshop and dated 1480-90, show an almost identical figure of a leader, if not for the much more harmonious features of his face. It is not excluded, if the attribution is correct, that Leonardo may have drawn on his own experience in the master's workshop for the creation of Galeazzo's costume.

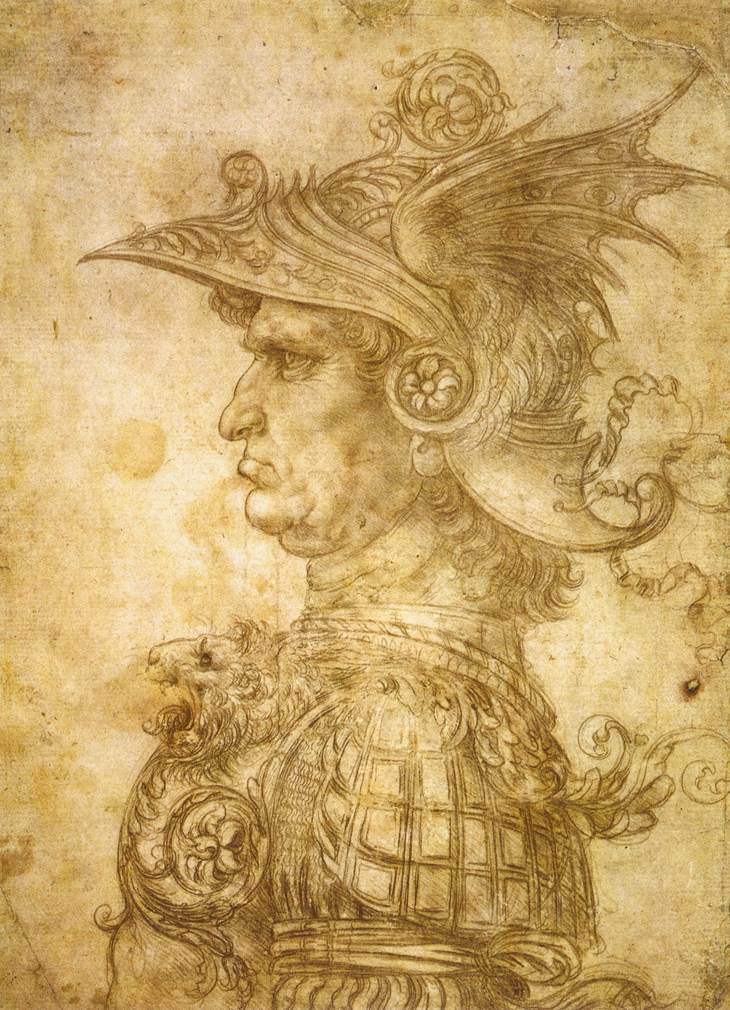
Il Condottiere or Profilo di capitano antico, Leonardo da Vinci.

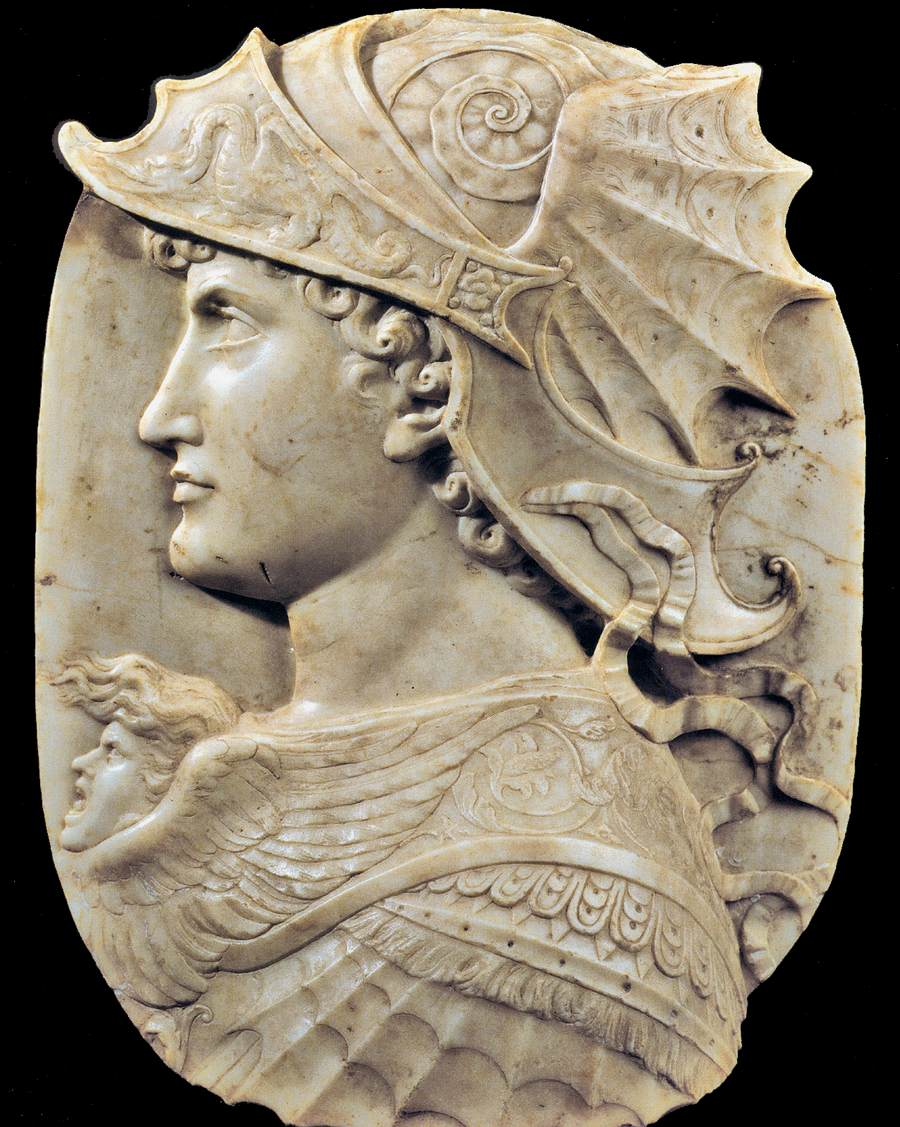
Alexander the Great.

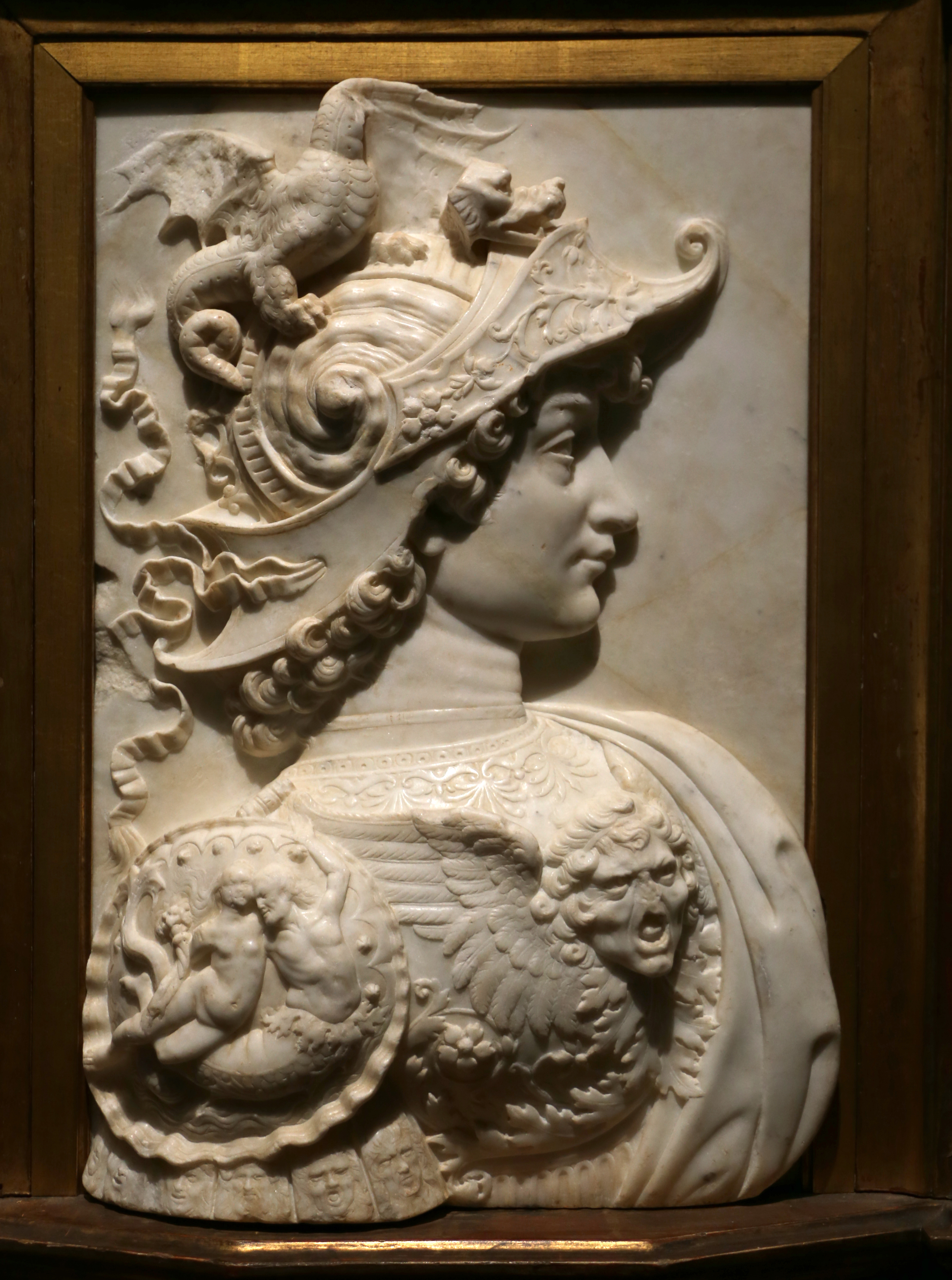
Alexander the Great.

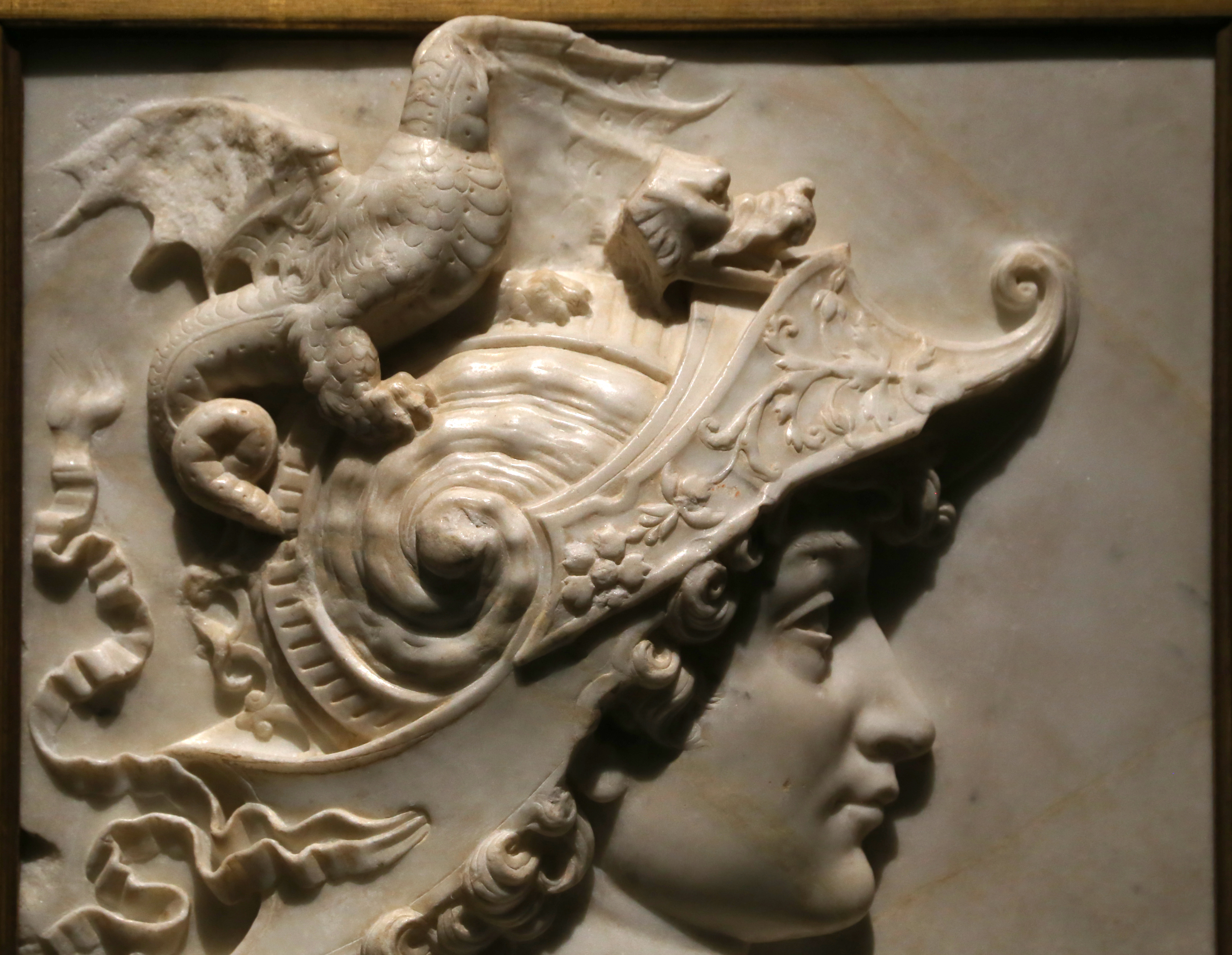
Detail of dragon

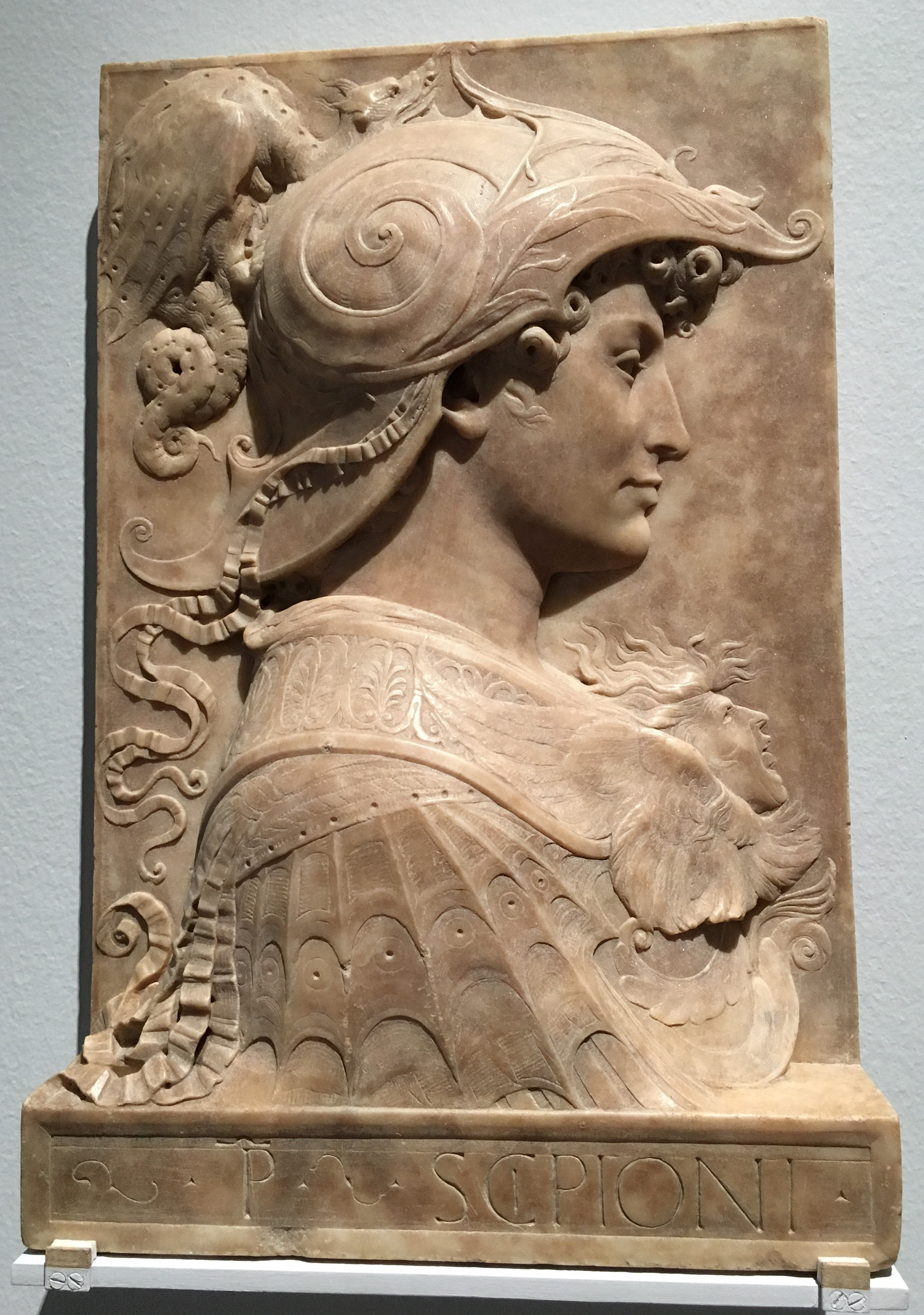
Scipion Africanus, 1465-1468. Paris, Louvre

== Honours ==
Knight of the Order of St. Michael
— 1494

== In mass culture ==
It was Galeazzo, small and thin in person, pale in the face: the agile cut of the body, the dexterity of the limbs, the softness of the face, the easy smile of the lips, made him dear to all the Milanese youth and he was always applauded when he wounded tournaments or ran gualdane. Beatrice was amazed to see the redemption of so many beauties under the silk dress that covers it; she palpitated at the danger of such a graceful youth, and in her heart she begged him for victory. And the victory had to be for him!

— Ignazio Cantù, Beatrice o la corte di Lodovico il Moro

=== Literature ===
Galeazzo appears as a character in several novels:

- The Duchess of Milan, by Michael Ennis (1992), where he is the lover of Isabella of Aragon and true father of the Duchy Francesco;
- The Swans of Leonardo, by Karen Essex (2006);
- La misura dell'uomo, by Marco Malvaldi (2018);
- My name is Bianca, by Massimo Gregori Grgic (2020).

=== Television ===
In the 2021 Anglo-Italian television miniseries Leonardo, Galeazzo is played by Italian actor Antonio De Matteo, but has little to do with the historical character.

== Bibliography ==
- Antoine Varillas (1691). Histoire de Charles VIII (in French).
- "L'Histoire de la Republique de Venise". Histoire universelle: depuis le commencement du monde jusqu'a present (in French). Vol. 33. Arkstée & Merkus. 1771. p. 292.
- Paul L. Jacob (1834). Histoire du XVI siècle en France (in French).
- Richard Clayton (1798). Memoirs of the House of Medici. The Monthly Review. p. 253.
- Vincenzo Calmeta (2004). Rossella Guberti (ed.). Triumphi. Scelta di curiosità letterarie inedite o rare dal secolo XIII al XIX. Bologna: Commissione per i testi di lingua.
- Francesco Malaguzzi Valeri (1913). La corte di Lodovico il Moro: la vita privata e l'arte a Milano nella seconda metà del Quattrocento. Vol. 1. Milano: Hoepli.
- Maria Serena Mazzi (2004). Come rose d'inverno, le signore della corte estense nel '400. Nuovecarte. ISBN 9788887527162.
- Luisa Giordano (2008). Beatrice d'Este (1475-1497). Vol. 2. ETS. ISBN 9788846720573.
- Deputazione di Storia Patria per la Lombardia (1874). Archivio storico lombardo. Vol. 39. Società Storica Lombarda.
- Alessandro Giulini (1912). "Bianca Sanseverino Sforza". Archivio Storico Lombardo serie IV. Vol. 18. Milano: Libreria Bocca.
- Cartwright, Julia Mary (1945). Beatrice d'Este, Duchessa di Milano. Milano: Edizioni Cenobio.
- Richard Clayton, Translation of Tenhove's Memoirs of the House of Medici, The Monthly Review, 1798, p. 253.
- L'Histoire de la Republique de Venise, vol. 33 of Histoire universelle: depuis le commencement du monde jusqu'a present, Arkstée & Merkus, 1771, 292f.
- Antoine Varillas, Histoire de Charles VIII, 1691.
- Paul L. Jacob, Histoire du XVI siècle en France, 1834.
