= Battle of Troia =

- Part of Conspiracy of the Barons
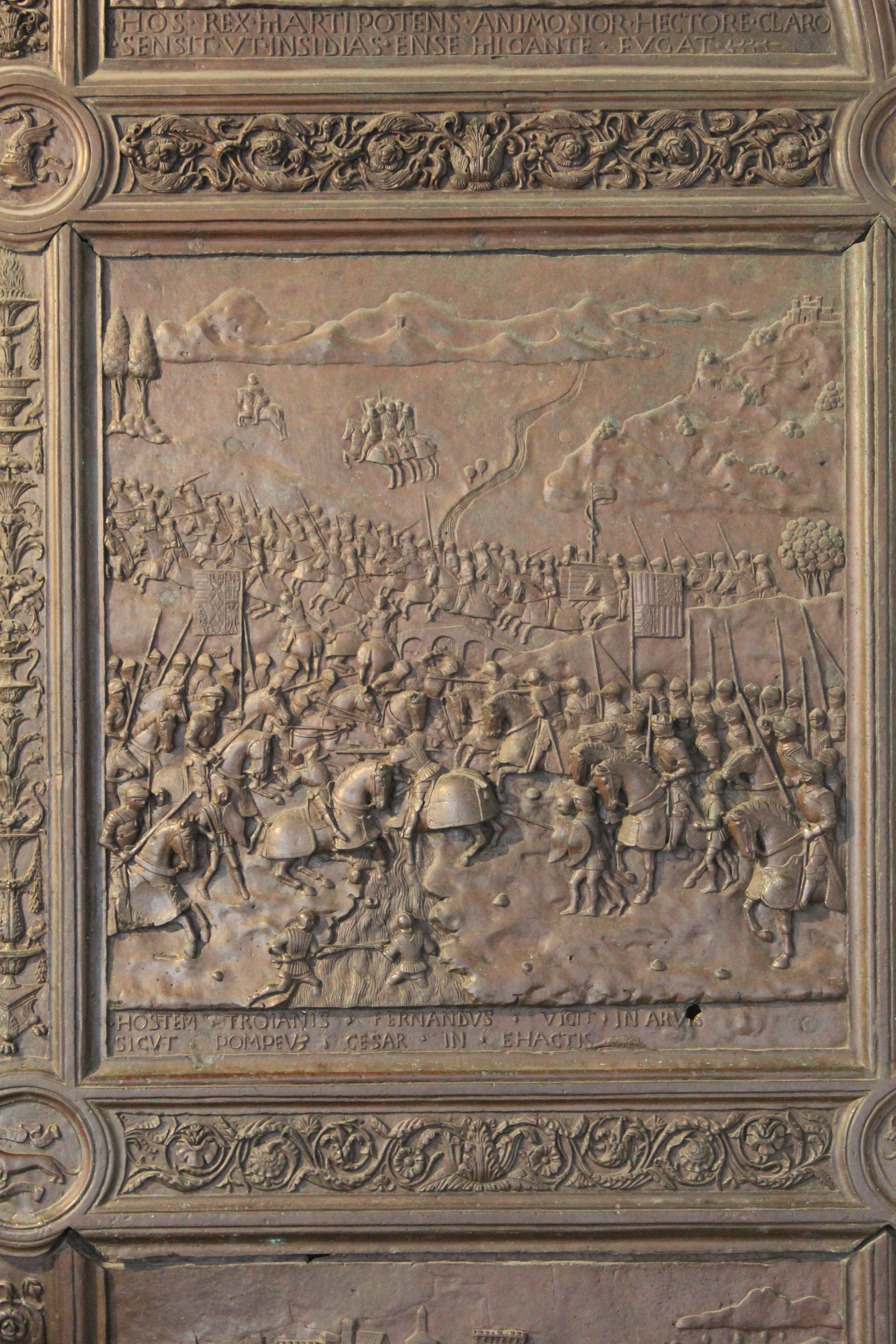
- Depiction of the Battle of Troia in 1462 on a door of the bronze door of the Castel Nuovo in Naples
Date	18 August 1462
Location	Between Orsara and Troia, Kingdom of Naples
Result	Victory of the army of King Ferrante d'Aragona

Belligerents
Army of King Ferdinand I of Naples	Army of John II, Duke of Lorraine

Commanders and leaders
Ferdinand I of Naples Alessandro Sforza Roberto Sanseverino d'Aragona Gjergj Kastrioti Skanderbeg Alberto Visconti Roberto Orsini Matteo di Capua Innico I d'Avalos Antonio Piccolomini, Duke of Amalfi	John II, Duke of Lorraine Ercole I d'Este Giovanni Antonio Orsini del Balzo Jacopo Piccinino Niccolò Orsini Giovanni Cossa Giulio Antonio I Acquaviva d'Aragona Federico II di Vaudémont Marino Marzano

Strength
50 squadrons of cavalry (2,000–4,000 cavalrymen) 2,000 infantry 700 Albanian horses and 1,000 Albanian veteran infantrymen	Angevins described as having a "numerical advantage" 2,500+ Angevin Infantry Unknown number of cavalry, likely around 3,000–4,000

Casualties and losses
500–1,000 casualties estimate	"Heavy losses" 2,000–4,000 casualties estimate 150 prisoners

The Battle of Troia was a major battle that took place on 18 August 1462 in the countryside of the Daunia Sub-Apennines, between the cities Orsara and Troia, in the Kingdom of Naples. The clash saw the armies of King Ferrante of Aragon and the pretender to the throne John of Anjou-Valois clash for the throne of Naples. This battle marked a turning point.

== Background ==
The Kingdom of Naples in the mid-15th century was destabilized by a factional conflict known as the Conspiracy of the Barons (Congiura dei Baroni, 1459–1462). A powerful coalition of Neapolitan nobles. Many members of the Sanseverino, Orsini, and Carafa families were split in support or opposition of the king. Many nobles had allied with the Angevin claimant John II of Lorraine son of René of Anjou in a bid to overthrow Ferrante I (Ferdinand of Aragon), who had ascended the throne in 1458 following the death of Alfonso the Magnanimous.

Ferrante was initially defeated by the Angevins and the rebel barons in the battle of Sarno on 7 July 1460. On that occasion, he was saved by the intervention of military troops, "provisioned" and "conscripts", of the city of Cava de' Tirreni, which were headed by the captains Giosuè and Marino Longo. These troops, arrived in Foce di Sarno, descended from the mountain and attacked the Angevins who, surprised and unable to determine the extent of the attack, were forced to retreat, giving King Ferrante the possibility of opening up through Nola, the escape to Naples. Fortunately for him, that battle did not have a decisive outcome, indeed the sovereign obtained further aid from the Duke of Milan Francesco Sforza.

In the summer of 1462, John II of Lorraine assembled a large army supported by Angevin and French contingents, reinforced by disaffected southern Italian barons. He marched through northern Apulia and laid siege to the fortified town of Troia, a strategically important city under royalist control. Ferrante, realizing the risk of losing the region, rapidly mobilized his loyal forces and marched to confront the rebels.

== The Battle ==
In August 1462, the two forces converged in northern Apulia near the town of Troia (in modern Foggia province). Ferrante initiated an offensive into the rebel-held Capitanata region in mid-1462, aiming to dislodge the barons and Angevins from their strongholds. In late July 1462, the royalist army captured the small fortress-town of Accadia after a 19-day siege. Accadia fell on 9 August 1462, denying the rebels an important outpost and boosting the morale of Ferrante's troops. John II of Lorraine field army, led by condottiero Jacopo Piccinino, had been in the vicinity and attempted to relieve Accadia, but failing that, they withdrew toward Troia. Ferrante, flush with his recent success, pursued the enemy. Just over a week later, on 18 August 1462, the decisive encounter took place on the plain between Orsara di Puglia and Troia.

Both sides arrayed for battle on open ground. The combat began in the morning and lasted for about six hours. Detailed tactical descriptions are scarce in contemporary chronicles, but it is clear that condottieri Roberto Sanseverino and Roberto Orsini performed a cavalry charge that played a pivotal role and tipped the battle in favor of Ferrante. Backed by infantry reserves, Ferrante likely sought to smash the Angevin center or trigger a collapse of their flanks by weight of cavalry. Some accounts suggest that Ferrante and Alessandro Sforza led a coordinated assault that finally broke the Angevin lines. The rebel infantry could not withstand repeated attacks from Ferrante's armored men-at-arms once the cavalry gained the upper hand.

After intense fighting, the royalist Aragonese army gained a clear upper hand, and the Angevin-Baronial forces began to give way. Chroniclers note that King Ferrante and his general Alessandro Sforza inflicted a definitive defeat on their adversaries at Troia. As the Angevin line faltered, many of John's soldiers started to retreat in disorder toward the walled town of Troia. The Angevin army collapsed by late afternoon, effectively ending the battle. Ferrante's troops pressed the fleeing enemy, pursuing them right up to the gates of Troia.

Ferrante's forces captured the city of Troia itself. Troia had served as a key Angevin garrison and stronghold for the rebel barons; after the battle, the town fell into Ferrante's hands (either by storm or the garrison's surrender).

== Aftermath ==
The Battle of Troia decisively turned the tide of the Conspiracy of the Barons. The Prince of Taranto made peace with Ferrante and was followed by other barons, and the Prince died in November 1463, ending the internal revolt. Jean continued his quest but was defeated in a naval battle at Ischia on 7 July 1465, when Juan II of Aragon's flotilla helped the Neapolitan navy. John of Lorraine campaign collapsed, and he fled to northern territories, eventually returning to Provence in 1464. Many of the rebel barons surrendered or were captured in the months that followed. Ferrante began consolidating his power through both diplomatic pardons and ruthless repression.

The victory cemented Ferrante's rule and demonstrated the strength of the emerging Aragonese administration in Naples. In the long term, the defeat of the Angevins at Troia contributed to the final decline of Angevin influence in southern Italy.

Troia itself remained a loyal Aragonese stronghold, and the battle became a symbol of the king's legitimacy. Ferrante commemorated the victory in royal propaganda and rewarded his commanders—particularly Roberto Sanseverino and Diomede Carafa—with lands and titles.
