= Aliprando Caprioli =

Italian engraver

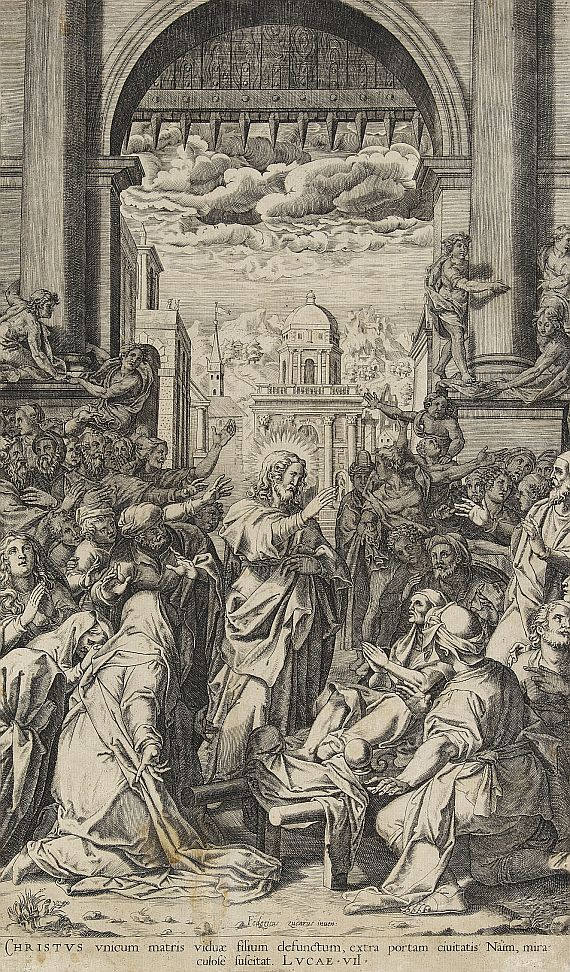
Jesus raises the son of the widow of Naim by Aliprando Caprioli, 1580

Aliprando Caprioli was an Italian engraver, born in Trento and active in Rome between 1575 and 1599, producing portraits and historical subjects in the style of Agostino Carracci and Cornelis Cort.
