= Bianca Giovanna Sforza =

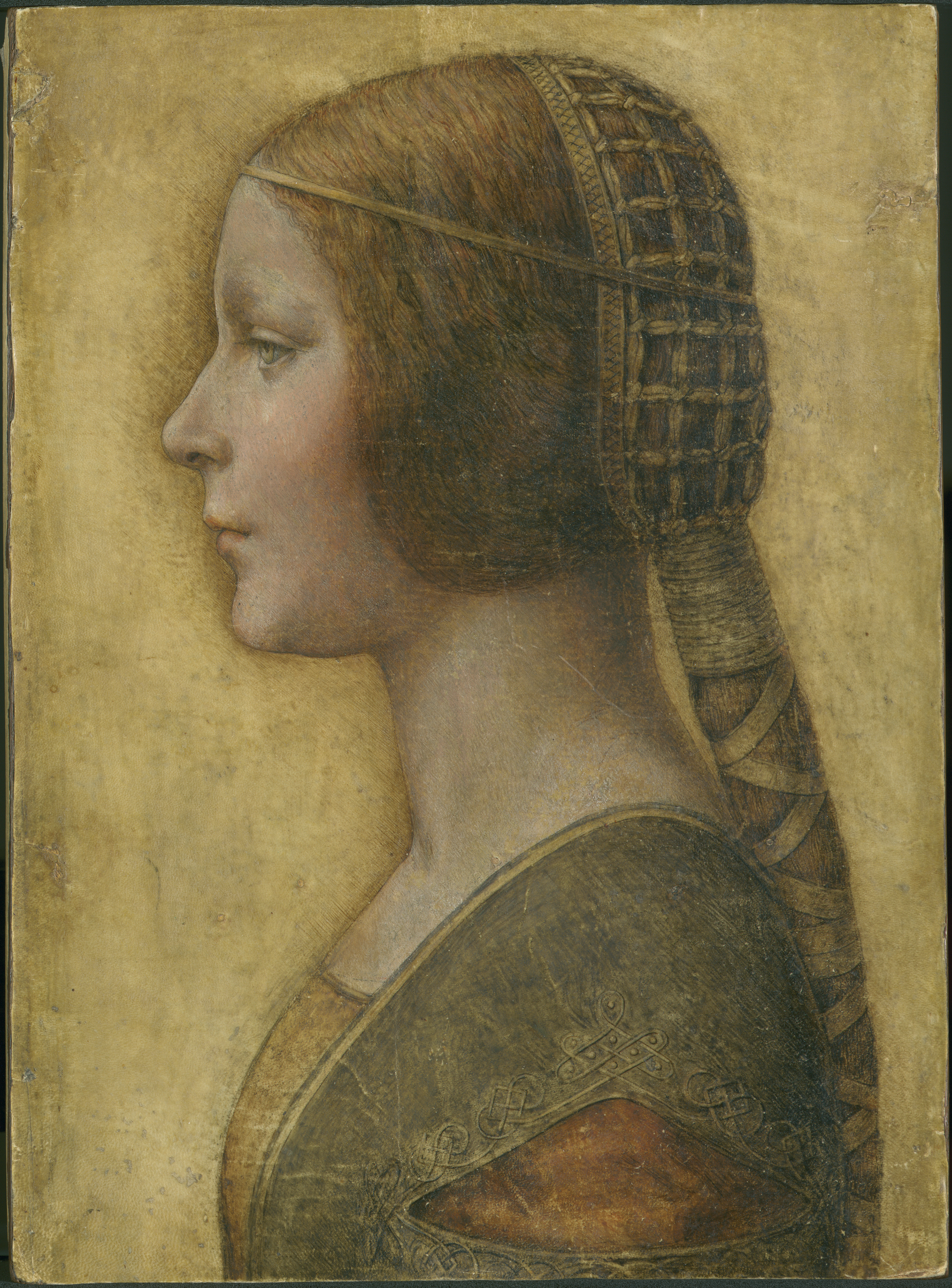
- Bianca Giovanna Sforza, La Bella Principessa, attributed to Leonardo da Vinci

Countess of Bobbio and Voghera
- Tenure: 14 December 1489 – 23 November 1496
- Successor: None
- Born: 1482; Lombardy, Italy
- Died: 23 November 1496 (aged 13–14); Milan
- Burial: Santa Maria delle Grazie, Milan
- Spouse: Galeazzo Sanseverino
- House: Sforza
- Father: Ludovico Sforza
- Mother: Bernardina de Corradis
- Religion: Roman Catholic

Bianca Giovanna Sforza (1482 – 23 November 1496) was an Italian noblewoman, she was the illegitimate daughter, then legitimized of Ludovico Sforza and his lover Bernardina de Corradis, she was wife of Galeazzo Sanseverino and favourite of Beatrice d'Este.

== Early life ==
In the year of 1482, Bianca was born in Lombardy, Italy, from birth she was declared illegitimate and was the only daughter of Ludovico Sforza, (Regent of Milan) and his lover at the time who was known as Bernardina de Corradis.

Following up with Bianca's childhood, not much has been uncovered yet and there has been little information given about the topic. In 1485, Bianca, (aged 3) was promised marriage to her father's new favourite, Galeazzo Sanseverino, who was 22 years old at the time.

On a particular day, on December, year 1489, Bianca's cousin, Gian Galeazzo Sforza, the current Duke of Milan, granted the right to legitimize Bianca to Bernardina de Corradis's husband, the Duke Palatine Nicolò Gentili.

With her fate now in somebody else's hands, finally, on November 14, 1489, almost a week later, Bianca was legitimized, she was now recognized as the child of Ludovico. This process took place in the Visconti-Sforza Castle (Vigevano). Proceeding with her legitimization, Bianca was officially married shortly after to Galeazzo Sanseverino, Captain General.

According to Antonio Zunico, it is clearly stated that her father, Ludovico promised Bianca to the illustrious powerful marquis and soldier, Galeazzo Sanseverino. His aforementioned beloved daughter by way of marriage, with the intention of giving her to him in marriage as soon as she reached the legitimate age.

About a month later, On January 10, 1490, in the Castello Sforzesco, the now newly-wed couple celebrated their marriage. Although most of Ludovico's decisions were influenced by his desire to please his favourite, Galeazzo, he took a part for himself, he set this up so he could expand his own feudal domains. To Ludovico, it was more of a project. He wanted the property the Dal Verme family had taken over after the tragic death of Count Pietro. And he decided to do that with his proclaimed daughter and son-in-law.

Given the tender or inexperienced age of the bride, the marriage remained nominal for the most part. During this time period, Bianca continued living at court. She thrived, moving to family properties frequently and was pampered and spoiled by all, especially by her step-mom, Beatrice d'Este. The two met when she was just 15, Bianca treated her like a sister, and her family seemed to embrace her and welcomed her with open arms.

Bianca was always by her step-mom's side, and followed her almost everywhere to events. The following year 1494, she accompanied her to Asti.

Bianca cared for many, and was specifically close to Beatrice's second-born, Francesco. Bianca also spent time with Beatrice's first son, Maximilian Sforza. She could persuade him into taking his medicine.

== Mona Lisa ==
Recent historical-artistic studies and confirmed scientific hypotheses have shown that the landscape that is in the background to Leonardo da Vinci's Mona Lisa is taken from Bobbio. The landscape that forms the background to the picture is that of Bobbio seen from the Malaspina dal Verme Castle, according to the scientific researcher Carla Glori. Furthermore, on the basis of these historical-artistic studies, some have speculated that Sforza may be the sitter for Leonardo da Vinci's Mona Lisa.However, scholarly consensus still favours Lisa del Giocondo as the most likely candidate.

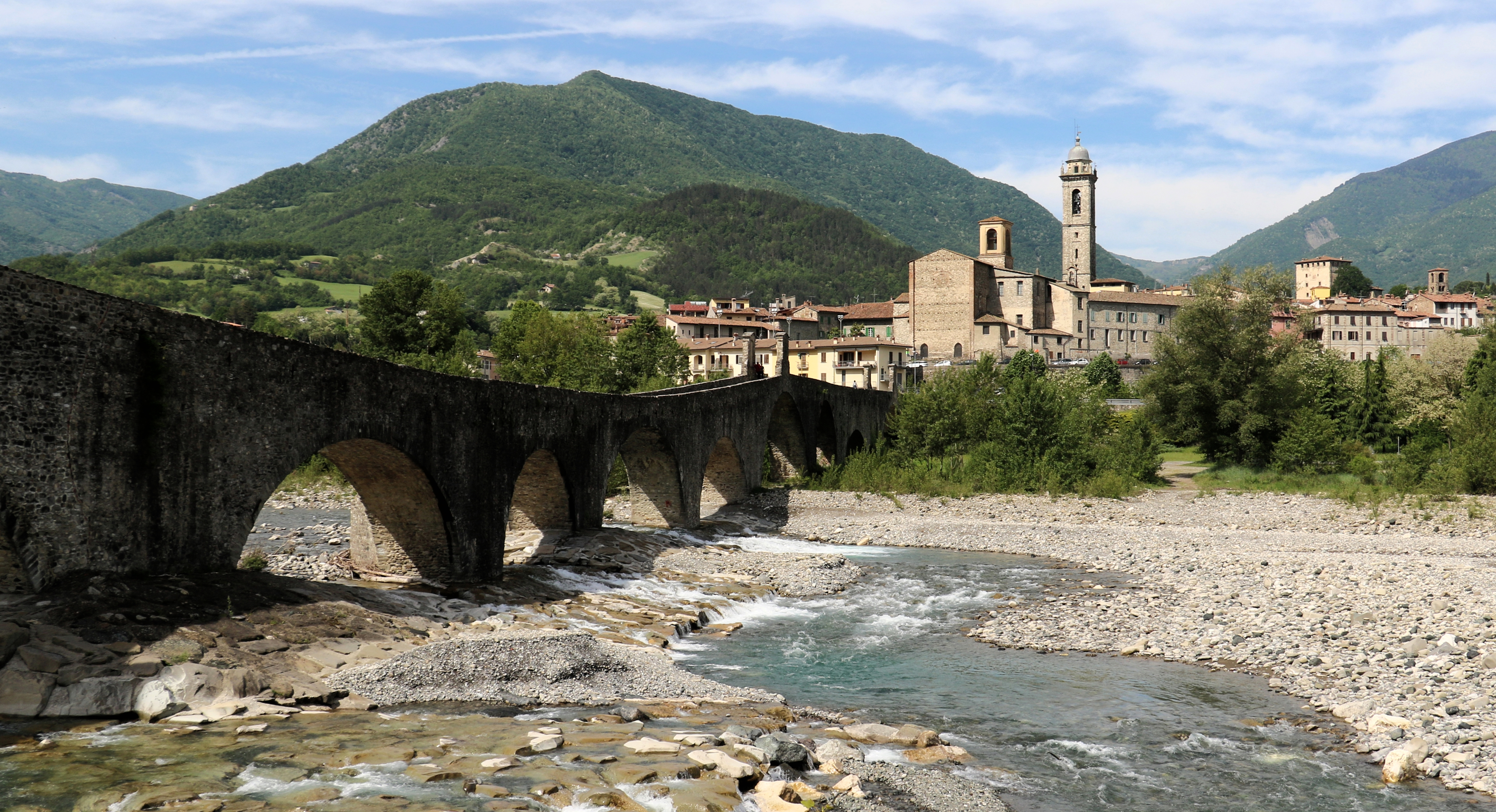
Ponte Gobbo or Ponte Vecchio, Bobbio (Piacenza)

The full Mona Lisa painting (Italian: La Gioconda, French: La Joconde) by Leonardo da Vinci, Louvre, Paris

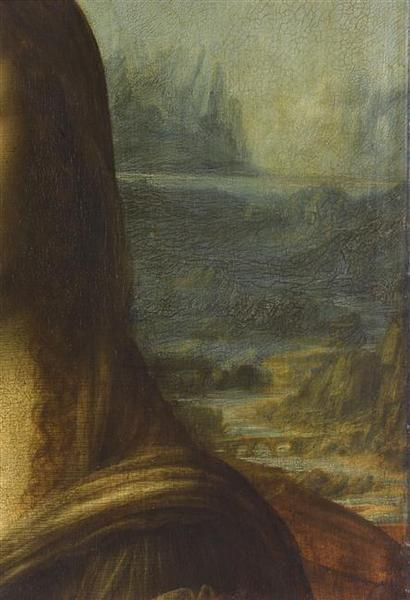
Detail of the background (right side) of Mona Lisa
