= Battle of Calliano (1487) =

- Part of War of Rovereto
| Date | 10 August 1487 |
| Location | near Calliano, Trentino |
| Result | Trent/Tyrolean victory |

Belligerents
| Republic of Venice | (Holy Roman Empire) Bishopric of Trent (Holy Roman Empire) County of Tyrol |

Commanders and leaders
| Roberto Sanseverino d'Aragona †; Guido de Rossi | Micheletto Segato; Friedrich Kappler; Georg von Ebenstein |

Strength
| 3,000 infantry 1,200 cavalry | 1,900 infantry 200 cavalry |

Casualties and losses
| 1,400 killed | c. 500–700 killed |

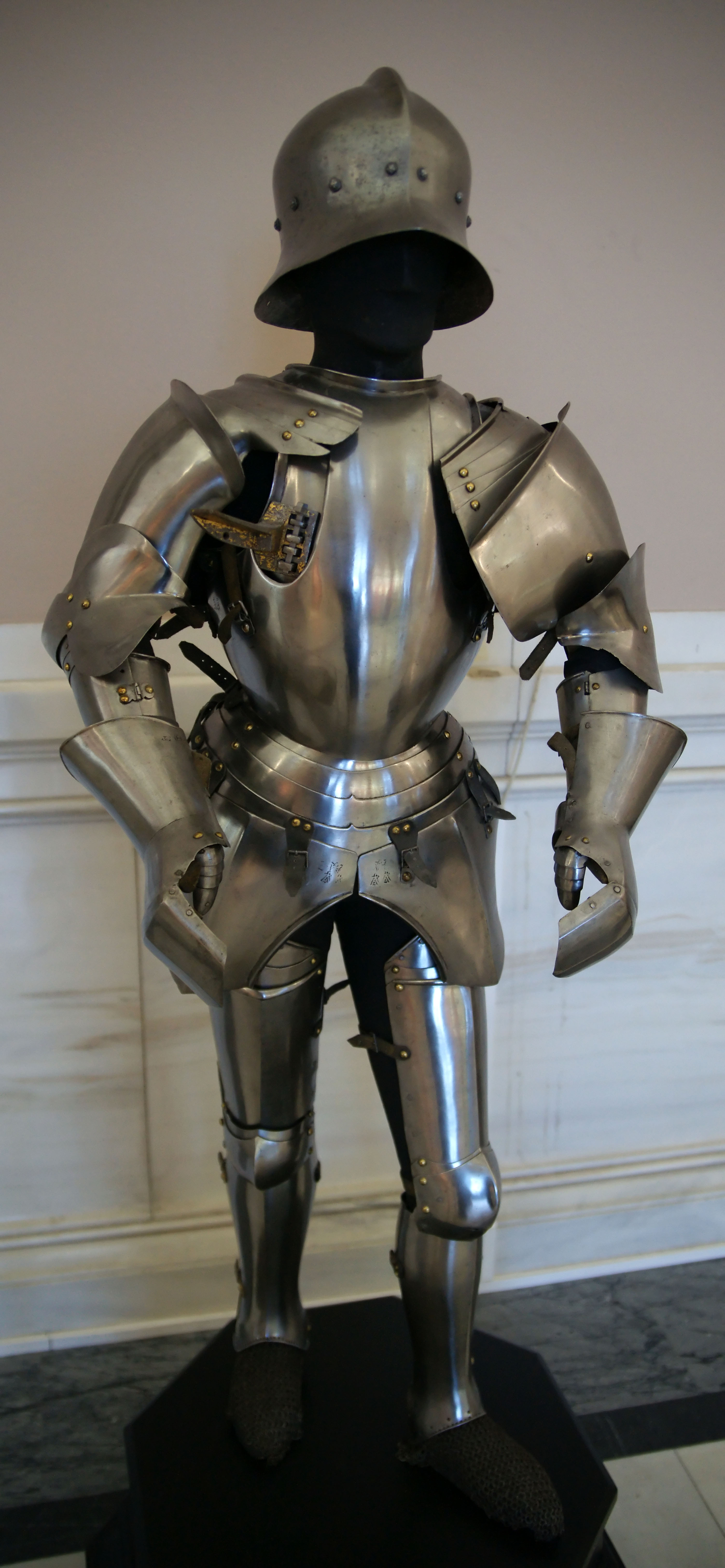
The armour worn by Roberto Sanseverino and looted by the Tyroleans, now kept in the arms and armour collection of Kunsthistorisches Museum, Vienna.

The Battle of Calliano was the decisive battle in the conflict between the Republic of Venice and Sigismund of Habsburg also known as the War of Rovereto. It was decisive to stop the Venetian advances into the Tyrol.

The Venetian invasion force, led by Roberto Sanseverino d'Aragona, was camped near Pomarolo and Castel Nomi. During the night, Venetian pioneers swam across the Adige to build a floating bridge, providing access to Castel Beseno and Castel Pietra, the last stronghold of the defense of Trento (Trient). Sanseverino moved in his forces and laid siege to these forts, planning to starve their garrisons into surrender. Sanseverino also sent ahead some of his troops towards Trento with the task of looting and scaring the local population.

Micheletto Segato, fighting for the Tyrolean defenders, arriving from Giudicarie attacked the Venetian forces besieging with 400 men. At Castel Beseno, Tyrolean commander Friedrich Kappler was informed of the situation by use of a system of optical signals. Kappler decided to attempt a surprise attack on the Venetians, joining Segato's attack.

Segato had been repulsed by the numerical superiority of the enemy, but the arrival of Kappler caught the enemy unaware, and most of the Venetian infantry fled, stopped near the floating bridge across the Adige.

The Venetian cavalry, under the direct command of Sanseverino and his lieutenant Guido de Rossi, stood to face the attack. After about two hours' fighting, the situation was still in the balance. At that point, the arrival of Georg von Ebenstein's militia, charging the Venetians from the hillsides, tipped the balance. The retreating Venetian cavalry put pressure on their own infantry caught on the riverside, pushing them onto the floating bridge, which collapsed under the excessive weight, resulting in hundreds of deaths by drowning. The Venetian commander himself was among the dead.

The battle is on record as the first deployment of Landsknechte, "German" (Swabian, or in this case Tyrolean) troops trained in the manner of the Swiss against an Italian army, a constellation that would recur numerous times during the Italian Wars of the early 16th century.

The battle was widely celebrated in Tyrol and Austria (Habsburg lands) and was a favourite of Maximilian I, but it had no immediate political or strategic consequences. The fate of Venetian interests in the region would be decided later in the War of the League of Cambrai in 1508/1509.
