= Death of Beatrice d'Este =

Death of the duchess of Milan

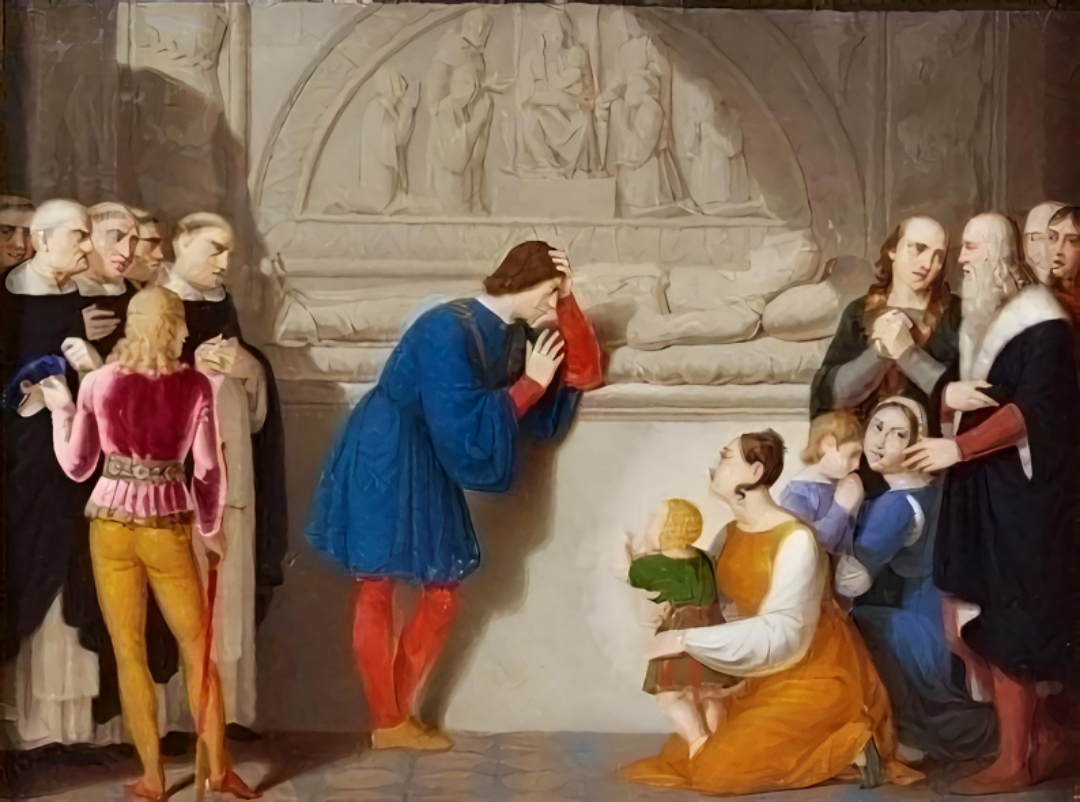
- The Farewell of Ludovico il Moro to the Ashes of his Wife Beatrice d'Este, Giovanni Battista Gigola, c. 1815, Pinacoteca Ambrosiana.
- Date: 2–3 January 1497
- Location: Castello Sforzesco, Milan
- Cause: Premature delivery or poisoning
- Deaths: Mother and son

Beatrice d'Este, Duchess of Milan, died during childbirth on the night of 2 to 3 January 1497. Bad omens preceded the event, and many historians believe it led to the downfall of her husband, Duke Ludovico Sforza, who lost power a few years later. It had a big impact in Italy and abroad, upsetting the previously established political balance and becoming the subject of many works of art and literature.

The deceased experienced a kind of symbolic deification by her husband, who manifested "an almost maddening mourning." Another version of the event, handed down by the historian Ludovico Antonio Muratori, suggests that she died by poisoning.

"Sad becomes at its end every thing that among mortals had appeared happy."

— Ludovico Sforza's words on the death of his wife, Saletta Negra.

== Background ==
Beatrice had already given birth, without any complications, of two sons. By spring-summer 1496, in her twenties, she was pregnant for the third time, despite the ill-feeling caused by her husband's notorious affair with one of her ladies-in-waiting, Lucrezia Crivelli, who had become his favorite.

Unlike other women, often confined to bed as soon as the pregnancy was evident, Beatrice did not stop following her husband around and continuing her favourite activities of hunting, riding and dancing. During her first pregnancy in 1492, when she was about five or six months pregnant, she shot a "very dangerous wild boar", and then she had been afflicted with a severe form of malaria and in danger of dying, but her delivery in January 1493 had been quick and easy, and, according to her mother Eleanor, Beatrice seemed not to have been affected at all. During her second pregnancy in 1494, between about the fifth and seventh month, she had traveled through northern Italy and accompanied the French army as far as Tuscany: also in January 1495, a few days after giving birth, she was "so agile" that she astonished the ambassador Benedetto Capilupi; above all, she astonished the whole court because, within a few weeks of giving birth, she had already left home and returned to her usual activities, although custom dictated that noblewomen should rest for about a month.

Also in the summer of 1496 she went to Mals to meet Emperor Maximilian there, undertaking a journey over the Alps described by sources as strenuous and taking part in hunts, without any nefarious signs. Still in November she was in Pavia, to greet the emperor who was returning to Germany, and did not leave for Milan with her husband until 7 December 1496, arriving there on the 10th.

Some historians attribute the cause of her death to malaria, which had afflicted her in 1492 during her first pregnancy, but no new relapses appear relative to 1496; others note that, a few months after her, Lucrezia Crivelli also became pregnant, and that this must have caused Beatrice's displeasure; others, finally, link the event to the tragic and untimely death of her beloved stepdaughter Bianca Giovanna Sforza, which occurred only a month before that of her stepmother. She was the illegitimate daughter of Ludovico and a close friend of hers from the first day of her arrival in Milan: Beatrice showed her great affection and always wanted her by her side. Although she was already in an advanced state of pregnancy, the news of her death was not kept from her; on the contrary, she had been informed in advance and it was left to her to decide the painful task of how to tell Ludovico without upsetting him. To her sister she later confessed that "we have felt such grief and sorrow over her death."

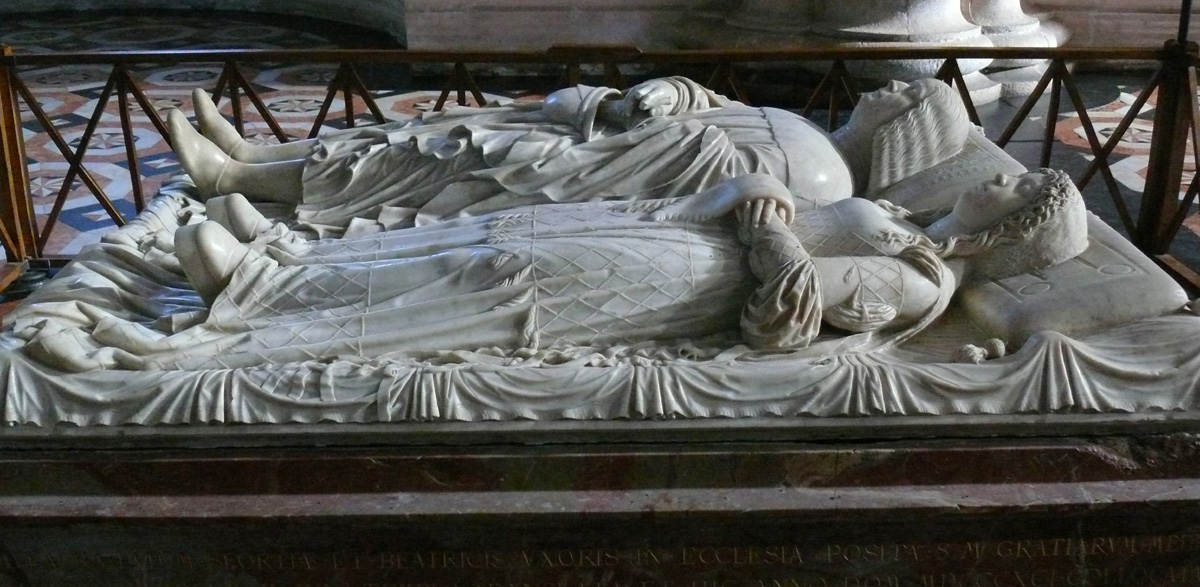
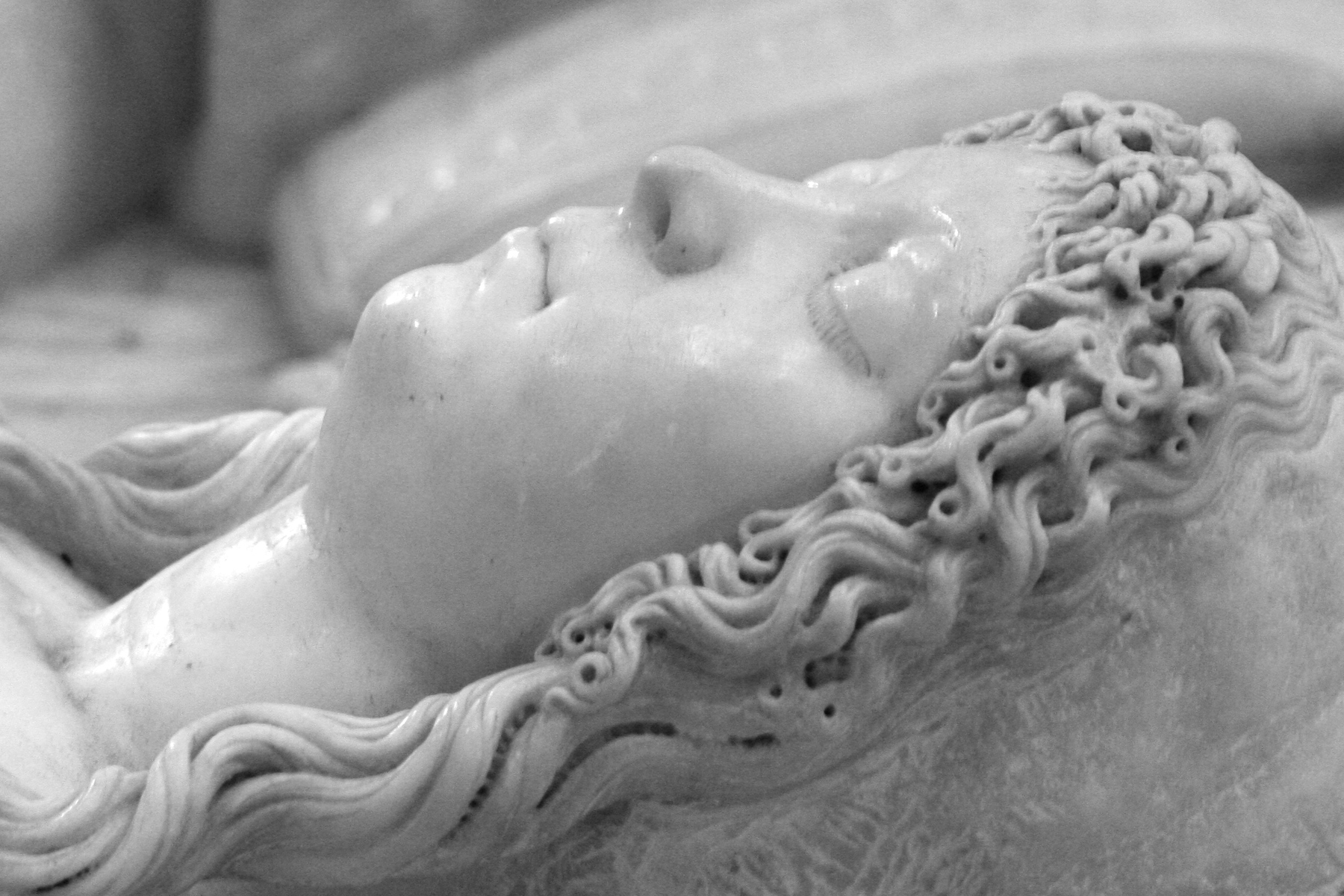
Cristoforo Solari, Cenotaph of Ludovico il Moro and Beatrice d'Este, 1497, Certosa di Pavia

The only sign that suggests any concern for the pregnancy was a vow made by Beatrice to visit the Shrine of the Madonna of Loreto after childbirth. This vow was later dissolved by Ludovico with the donation to that shrine of 100 gold ducats.

It is possibly significant that Emperor Maximilian, when he learned of her death, told the Ferrarese ambassador that, the last time he had seen her, she had not seemed to him the same cheerful and lively Beatrice he had first known, and that she seemed almost to know that she was about to die. However, this last meeting between the two took place after Bianca Giovanna's death, in the atmosphere of an already desolate and mourning court.

"His Majesty was saddened this morning when he was informed of this case by letters from the Duke, with many sweet words and gestures, and with tears; and he said that it seemed to him that, when he last saw her last month, there was a certain something in her appearance, not as cheerful and lively as usual, almost as if she had a presentiment of what was to follow."

— Letter from Pandolfo Colleonuccio to Ercole d'Este, January 10, 1497.

Another singular case was that Beatrice had long insisted on having with her the same midwife who had assisted her during the first two births, Frasina da Ferrara, despite the fact that she was ill and despite the fact that her father had suggested another equally good midwife from Ferrara. The Duchess's insistence and the mobilisation of the people were such that Frasina finally set off on a mule and arrived in Milan on time.

=== Portents ===
The death was preceded by sinister omens: according to the Venetian chronicler Marin Sanudo, Beatrice was walking through Milan on that day and when she came to the church where her mother-in-law Bianca Maria Visconti was buried, she stayed there for a long time contemplating her funeral, and those who were with her were unable to move her (however, historians interpret this passage as referring to the burial not of her mother-in-law, Bianca Maria Visconti, but of her beloved stepdaughter, Bianca Giovanna Sforza); thus at night, shortly before she died, the walls of her garden collapsed without any earthquake or breath of wind. The collapse of the wall in particular, according to historian Robert de La Sizeranne, was a premonition of the imminent collapse of Moro's power, caused precisely by the loss of his wife.

The Milanese historian Bernardino Corio then reports strange celestial phenomena, namely that just before the misfortune, the sky above the castle became a brazier of flames. (Note: "Then, at night, great fires appeared above the castle as an omen of the Sforza family's coming misfortune." — Bernardino Corio, Historia di Milano.)

This apparition has been compared by some historians to the one that took place on the same days in the sky of Parma, as described by Ludovico Cavitelli in his Annals: a "fax ignea", that is to say a torch, with three stars at the bottom and as many at the top, green in colour, with terrible human faces, appeared in the sky and was heard to murmur; at the same time the fields were filled with caterpillars. The same event is mentioned by Elia Cavriolo in his History of Brescia, although he refers to the following year: "There appeared in the sky a scythe, above which were three bloody stars, and under which were three others of green colour, and there appeared a terrible face of man, which, to the greatest horror of those present, murmured in the air. And many worms attacked the grass and the men".

== Death ==
[...] Make fertile

This monster on the throne, and may the son rip open
The haughty womb in which he was conceived,

And bring death to his cruel mother!

— Curse of Isabella of Aragon to her cousin Beatrice d'Este, from the tragedy Ludovico Sforza il Moro by Giovanni Battista Niccolini

On the day of 2 January, according to Sanudo, Beatrice was "cheerful" in Milan and danced in the castle until eight o'clock in the evening. From Ludovico's subsequent letter to the marquis of Mantua, his brother-in-law, it is possible to reconstruct the event succinctly, counting the hours according to the ancient system: between seven and eight o'clock in the evening Beatrice was in labor, between ten and eleven o'clock she gave birth to an already dead male child, and around midnight she died, at the age of twenty-one: (Note: "Everyone senses that this letter is not one of the usual eulogies. Deep and intense sorrow radiates from every line. And indeed, this was the strongest grief Moro had to suffer, for Beatrice was perhaps the only person in the world whom he loved with a living, unselfish, and tenacious passion. This woman, snatched from life so young, while she was the soul of all her husband's exploits and joys, the mother for a few years of two adored little boys, touched the hearts of all." (Luzio & Renier (1890, p. 87)).)

Our most illustrious consort this night had pain at two o'clock, gave birth to a dead male child at five o'clock, and gave up the spirit to God at six and a half, and we find ourselves in as much bitterness and sorrow as it is possible to feel, and we would so much rather have died first and not seen the dearest thing we had in this world leave us.

— Mediolani, 3 januarii 1497 hora undecima. Ludovicus M. Sfortia Anglus Dux Mediolani

A similar chronology is offered by the Mantuan ambassador in the letter warning her sister Isabella d'Este, with the difference that he states that the child died soon after, rather than before birth:

I am very sorry to have to inform Your Excellency of the death of the most illustrious Duchess, your sister, who departed this life at seven o'clock last Monday evening. She was taken ill at 2 o'clock, and at 5 o'clock gave birth to a male son, who died immediately; she died at 7 o'clock.

— Donato de Preti to Isabella d'Este, letter dated January 3, 1497.

In truth, the epitaph assures that the child was actually born dead. In other parts of Italy the story is told differently: the chroniclers of Ferrara – Bernardino Zambotti and the anonymous Ferrarese – speak of an abortion, that is to say a premature birth, although they give the erroneous news that Beatrice had lost a female child. This aspect also seems to be confirmed by the letter written by the secretary Bartolomeo Calco on behalf of Ludovico to the city of Pavia, if "maturo pariendi tempore" is indeed to be understood in the sense of a premature birth.

Johann Burchard, the papal protonotary, in his Liber notarum, even reports the birth of a "quoddam monstrum", a monstrous creature that was not buried but kept in the castle. (Note: Feria secunda huius mensis januarii, circa secundam horam noctis, peperit ill. domina ducissa Mediolani [...] in castro Mediolanensi quoddam monstrum, ex quo partu, ipsa ducissa, circa hora sextam ejusdem noctis, vita functa est [...]; monstrum vero in eodem castro retentum. On the second day of this month of January, in the second hour of the night, the most illustrious Lady Duchess of Milan [...] gave birth to a certain monstrous creature in the castle of Milan. As a result of this birth, the duchess died in the sixth hour of the same night [...]; the monster was actually kept in the same castle. — Johann Burchard, Liber notarum, ab anno MCCCCLXXXIII usque ad annum MDVI, Volume 2.)

== Moro's grief ==
Although he cheated on her with other women, Ludovico had a sincere and deepest love for his wife. Her loss was devastating to him, and he was never able to recover. For weeks at a time, he would remain locked in his own apartments in the dark, with the windows closed and by candlelight, accepting very few visitors. He came out for the first time on 31 January, secretly, only to visit the tomb of his wife. His hair turned greyish-white, losing its usual black colour, and he grew a beard, wearing only black clothes and a tattered beggar's cloak. Even after the first year of mourning, when he was allowed to wear other colours again, he declared that he would "continue to wear black", not only for himself but for the whole court. Neither he nor Galeazzo Sanseverino ever wore silk.

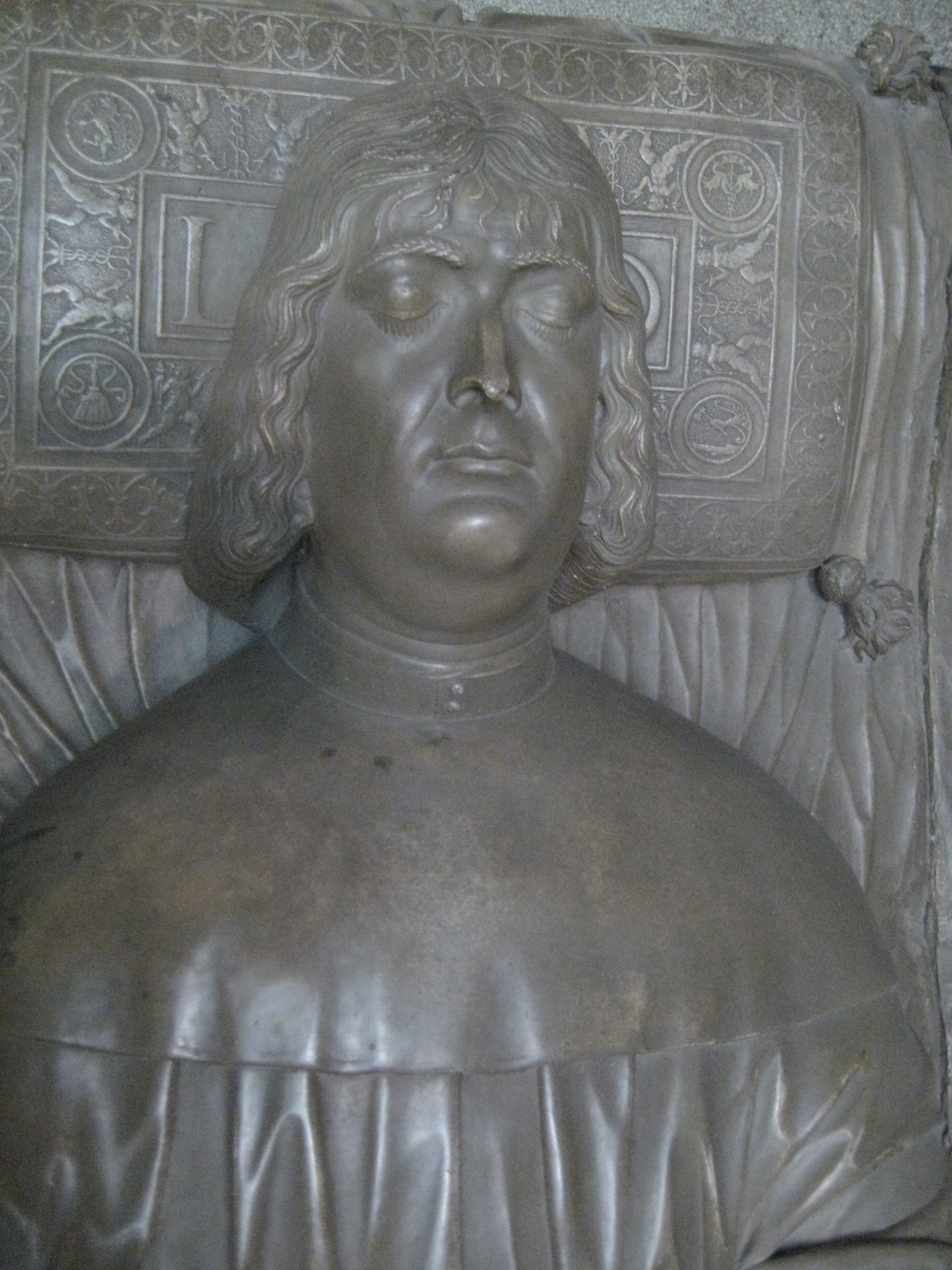
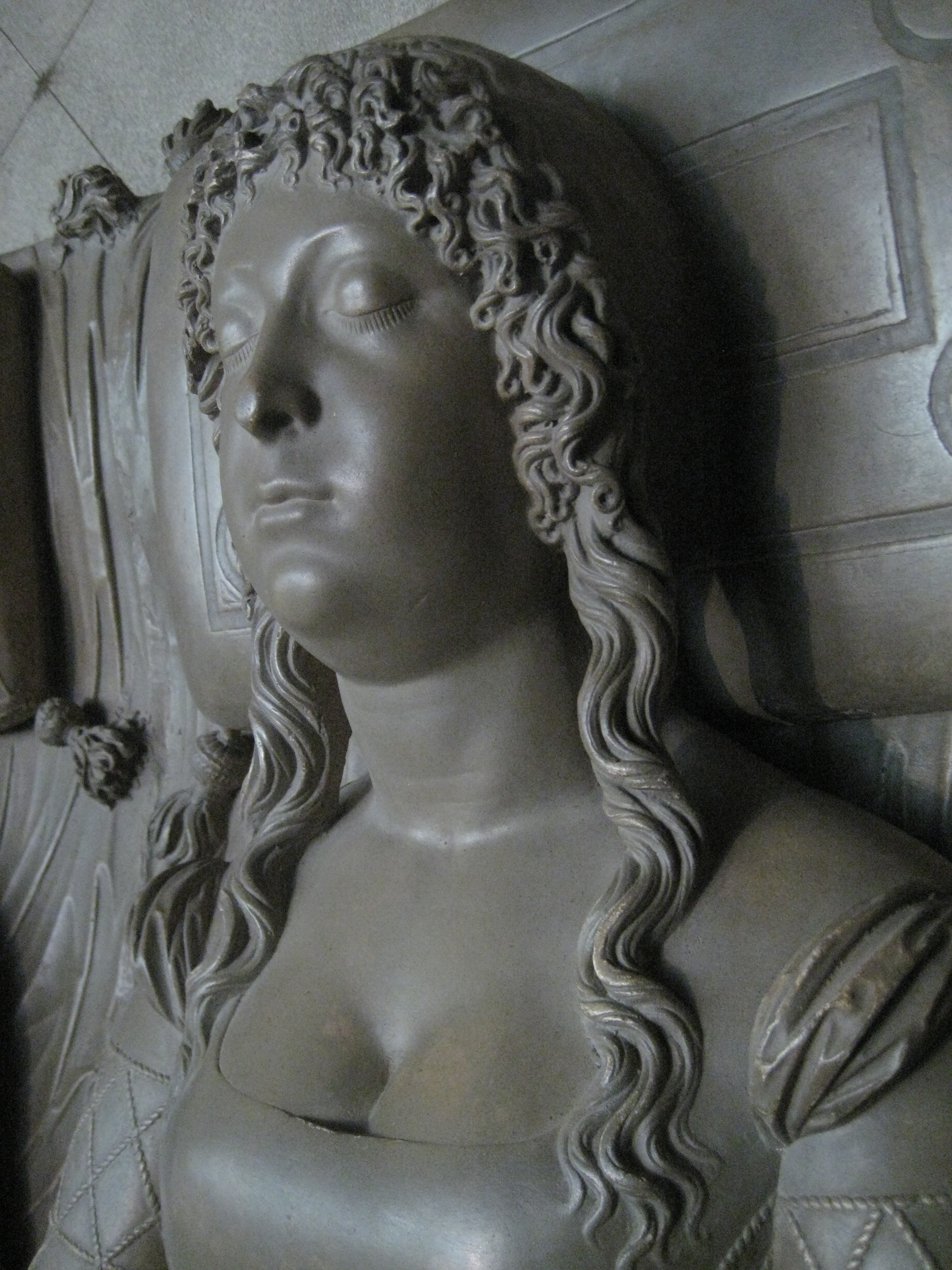
Detail of the cenotaph with the effigies of Ludovico and Beatrice. Cast from the Pushkin Museum

He had ordered that no relatives should attend the funeral, but at the last moment he changed his mind and summoned the Ferrarese ambassador, Antonio Costabili. The latter found him lying in bed, grieving and regretting "as much as ever" and, at the request of some counsellors, tried to console him to be patient. Ludovico replied that he "did not think he could ever endure so bitter a wound" and that he had sent for him to report to Duke Ercole that "if he had not been the good companion to your daughter that she deserved, and even if he had ever offended her in any way", as he knew he had done, "he would beg forgiveness from Your Excellency and from her, finding himself displeased to his soul," for "in all his prayers he had always prayed to Our Lord God that he would leave her after him, and then, if God did not like it, he would pray to him, and would always pray, that if it were possible that ever a living person could see a dead one, that he would grant him the grace to see her and to speak to her once, as he loved her more than himself." At the end of the speech, "after much lamenting and sobbing" and "mourning with words that would have broken stones", he invited the ambassador to accompany the body to the church.

Sanudo also writes that "the Duke could not bear her death because of the great love he had for her, and he said that he no longer wanted to care for children, for the state, or for worldly things, and that he hardly wanted to live [...] And then the Duke began to feel great grief, although he had always lived happily before." The anonymous Ferrarese even reports that, during the funeral, Ludovico wanted to remarry the deceased as if she were alive, in confirmation of his marriage vows, an act that was perhaps unprecedented. (Note: "I shall not comment on what the Duke of Milan did, for these things are unbelievable to those who did not see them; but it is said that at the funeral he honoured her so much that he wanted to marry her again, as if in church, for the great love he had for her; she left him two of her little sons, whose deaths were mourned by all the people of Ferrara. What an evil world!" — Ferrara Diary from 1409 to 1502)

The Milanese chronicler Giovan Pietro Cagnola confined himself to saying that "at the beginning of the present year, fortune was somewhat unfavourable to my most illustrious prince and lord; after Bianca, his beloved daughter, had already [...] gone to another life [...] the Duchess Beatrice, his most beloved wife, passed from this to a better life [...] the duke felt so much grief that I cannot write about it".

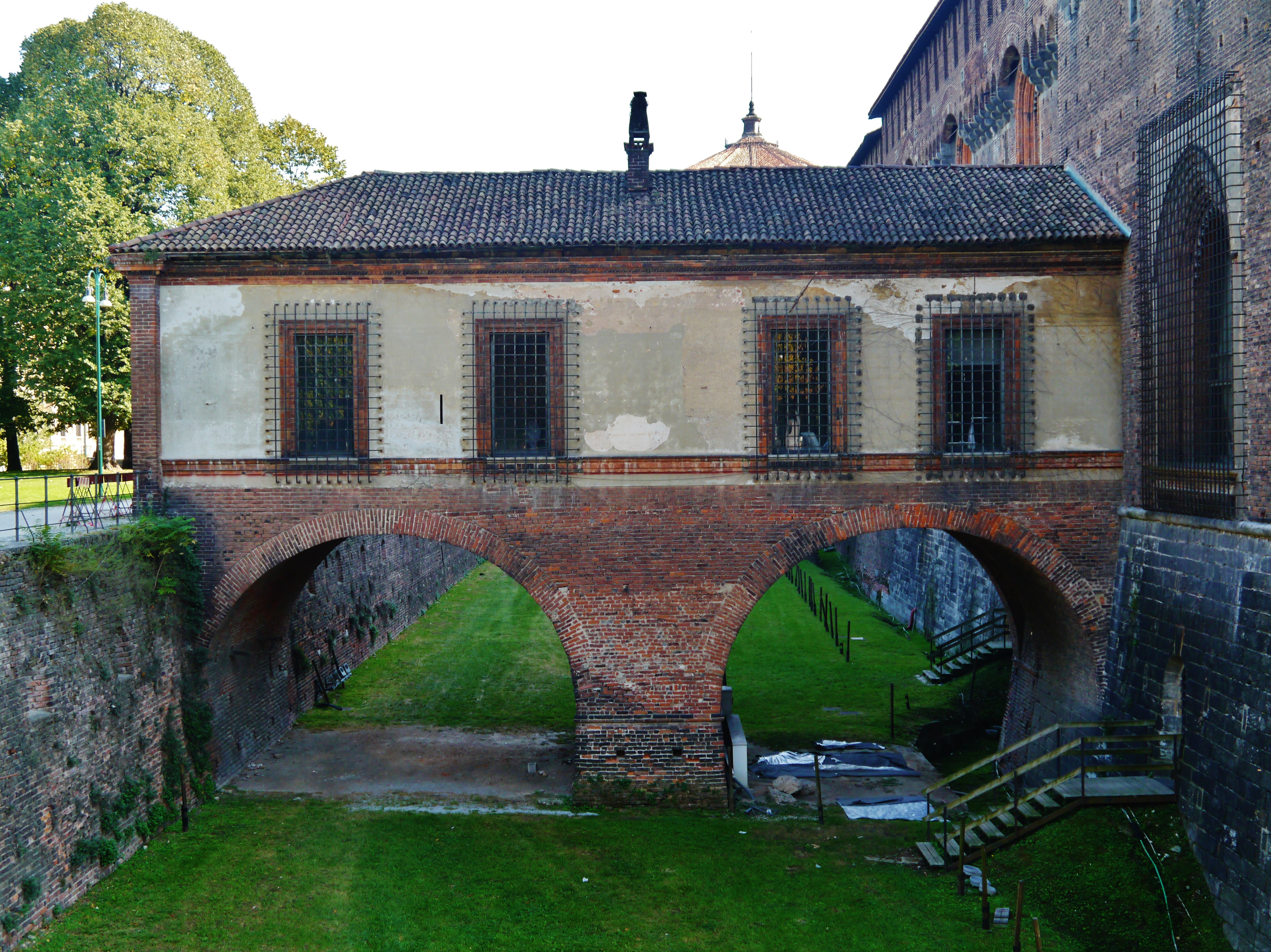
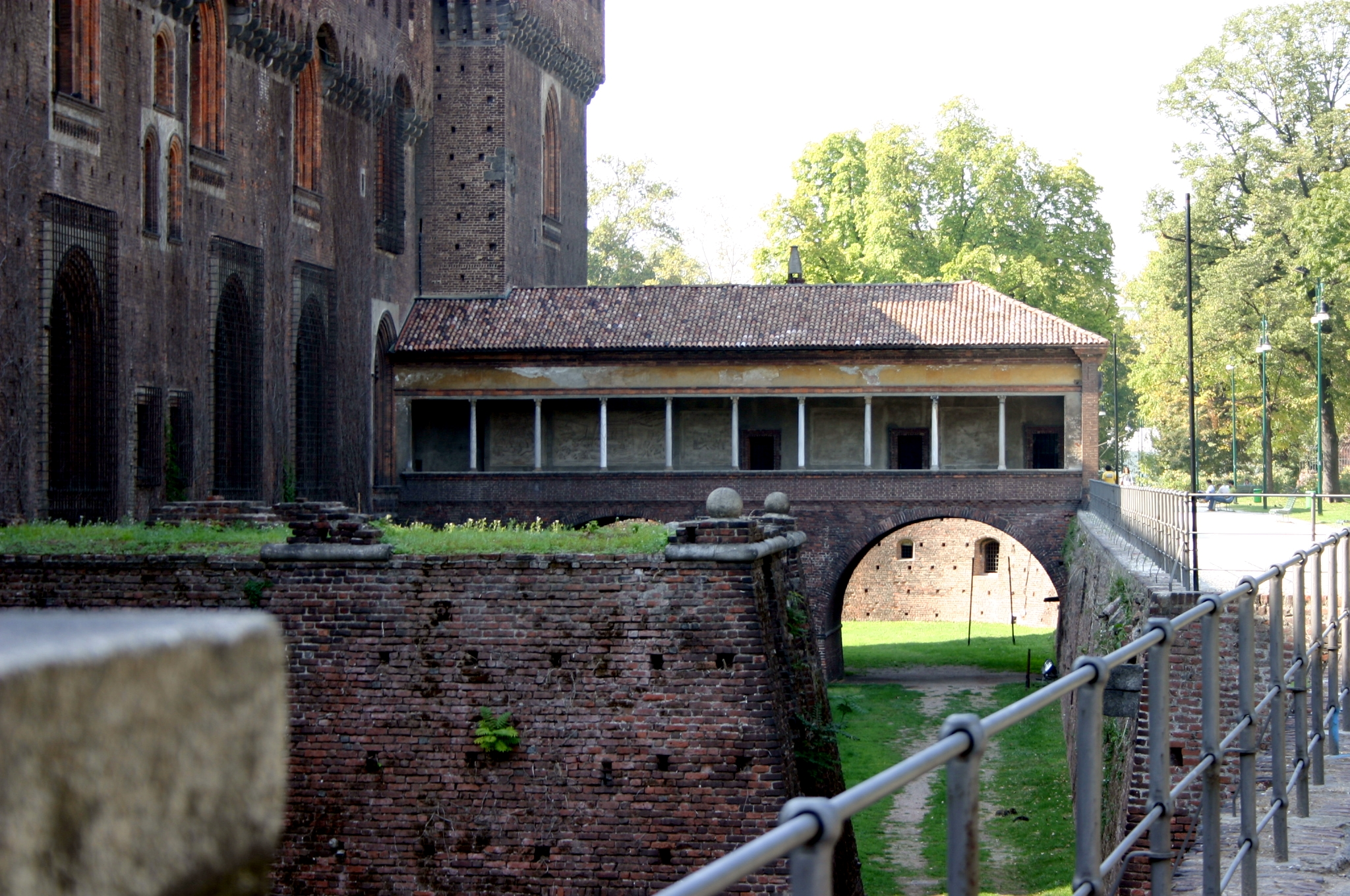
The so-called Ponticella di Ludovico il Moro in the Castello Sforzesco, where the Saletta Negra was located. All that remains today of the decorations commissioned from Leonardo da Vinci is a black marble slab with an inscription in Latin: In the end, everything that mortals have judged to be happy becomes sad.

He asked his brother-in-law Francesco not to send anyone to condole with him, "so as not to renew the grief"; he also refused, with few exceptions, to receive condolences from anyone, delegating this task to Gianfrancesco Sanseverino and Marchesino Stanga. He ordered the ambassadors not to mention Beatrice to him again, "not to mourn, not to show any sign of grief, but to speak of matters of state." He even went so far as to expel his niece Isabella of Aragon from the castle a few months later and to isolate her in the old Arengo palace, since, living in the rooms above his own, every step she made increased his grief.

He deprived himself of anything that might remind him of the pleasant times he had spent with his wife: for this reason he even stopped hunting, as he confessed to the Emperor Maximilian, to whom he apologised for not being able to send him good falcons as gifts, since he had not bred any since then. To his sister-in-law Isabella d'Este, who asked him for Beatrice's clavichord as a gift (knowing that it was now unused), he also confessed that he had never set foot in his wife's rooms since the day of her death and therefore could not give it to her, but that he would send it to her as soon as he entered those rooms (which in fact never happened, partly because Ludovico refused to move the contents of those rooms, wanting everything to be left as it was).

=== Apotheosis of the deceased ===
Conversely, and somewhat contradictorily, he lost no opportunity to remember his wife, whose apotheosis he decreed, creating a veritable cult of her:

1. He had a coin minted with Beatrice's effigy on the reverse and his own on the obverse; which was quite unusual, since before that time, it had never happened that the wife's face accompanied the husband's in coinage.
2. He ordered that almost all celebratory plates within the duchy bear Beatrice's arms and name (this meant, precisely, the increasingly frequent adoption of the bipartite coat of arms with the Este and Sforza arms, even within diplomas).
3. He had Beatrice's effigy reproduced on the carnelian of the signet ring he wore on his finger, replacing an earlier Roman emperor's head. Since it was customary for seals to depict either emblematic personages or the effigy of the one who held the highest sovereignty, as in the case of emperors or kings, Ludovico thus introduced an element of great novelty: "by having his newly deceased wife effigyed, he decreed her apotheosis and erected her image as the tutelary deity of the dynasty, a veritable icon of the ducal lineage." However, he never really felt up to wearing such a carnelian on his finger and entrusted it to one of his courtiers, Francesco Scafeto, who henceforth had the task of validating letters and documents on his behalf.
4. He obtained permission to venerate his wife religiously through her association with a hypothetical Saint Beatrice, to whom the Saletta Negra and a chapel in Santa Maria delle Grazie, near her burial place, were dedicated. The chapel mirroring it was instead dedicated to St. Ludovico.
5. He commissioned Cristoforo Solari to create a sumptuous funeral monument with their two reclining figures in marble, declaring that "one day, God willing, he would rest at his wife's side until the end of the world". A symbol of perpetual marital union, the tomb is one of the few examples in Italy of a double tomb specifically designed for spouses. This is another iconographic innovation of great significance, indicating the Moro's precise desire to place himself and his wife as the legitimate holders of power and re-founders of the dynasty, on a par with the great European monarchies. The fact, then, that he had himself depicted dead while still alive, which was highly unusual for those times, expresses the fact that his wife's death had by then deprived him of all reason to live.
6. To her memory he dedicated the Pusterla Beatrice, which he embellished in the Renaissance style.
7. For a whole year he vowed to eat standing up, on a tray held by a servant, and imposed fasting at court every Tuesday, the day of his wife's death.
8. In the castle, he had a room decorated entirely in black, later known as the Saletta Negra, a kind of sanctuary where he retreated to mourn his wife in solitude, and wherever he went, he wanted his quarters to be decorated in black.
9. Every day he visited her tomb at least twice, never failing to do so, so that ambassadors who wished to speak with him found him more often in Santa Maria delle Grazie than in the castle. There he would sometimes assemble the council, just as he had once ordered it to meet in Beatrice's chambers.
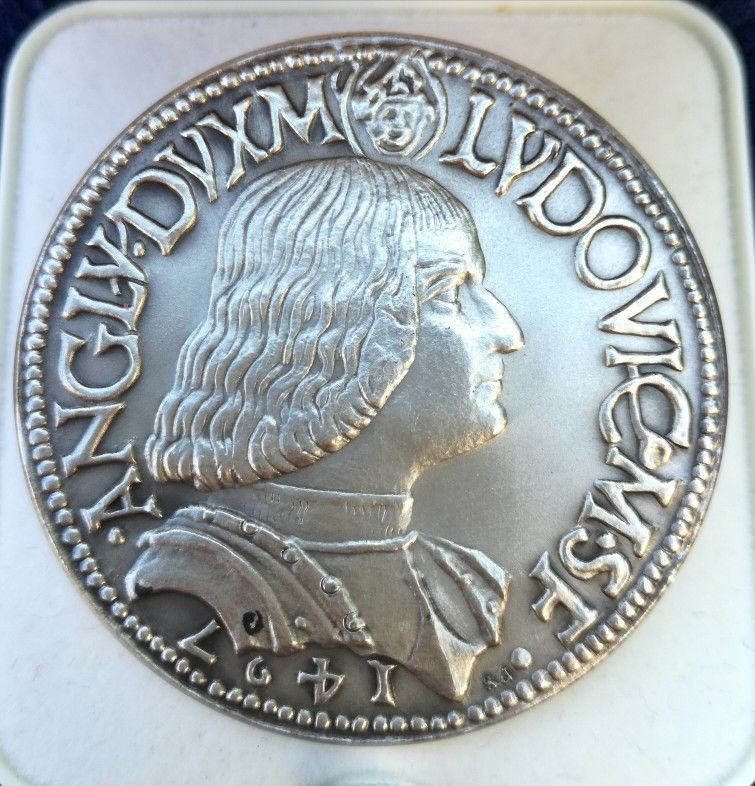
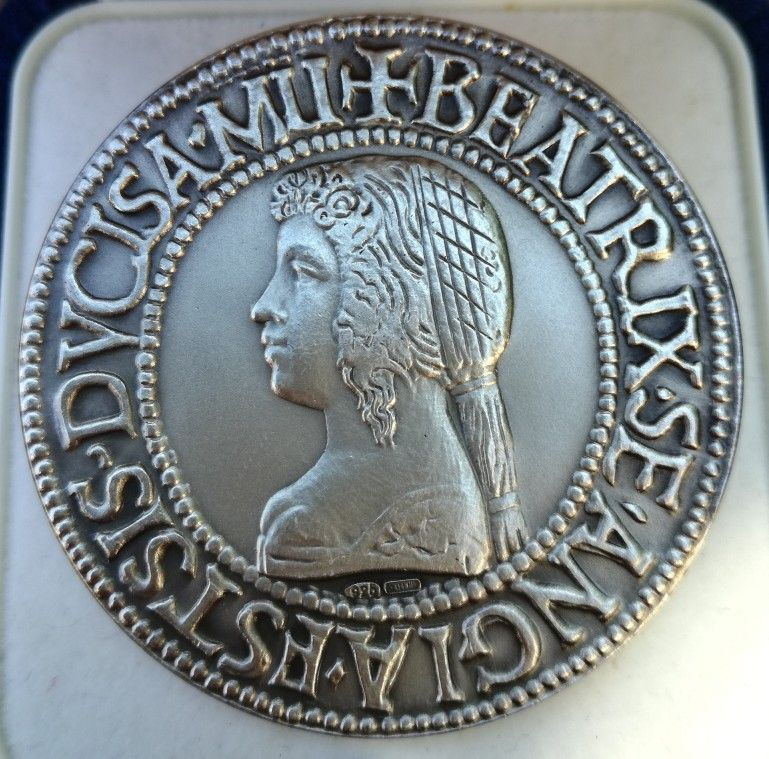
Reproduction in silver (1989) of the teston that Ludovico had minted in 1497 with his own effigy on one side and that of his wife Beatrice on the other; one of the earliest examples of coinage of this type, evidence of great love and admiration for his consort.

He became convinced that God was punishing him for his sins, and while his religiosity grew, he also began to take an interest in necromancy: he was in contact with a young necromancer from Ferrara who offered to come to Milan, assuring him that he was able to summon the spirits of the dead in human guise and promising to make him speak to them at will, but how the affair ended is unknown.

Sanudo tells us that in April 1497, "the Duke was very pious after the death of his wife; he fasted and lived chastely, and in his court he was not as he had been before, and at that time he seemed to fear God very much".

Such exaggerated displays of mourning affected all his contemporaries, although they were later interpreted by some historians as an artfully conducted farce, due to the fact that, although it seems that at first Ludovico had broken off his relationship with Lucrezia Crivelli, nevertheless in 1500 the woman found herself pregnant again. If this was the case, however, it is not clear to whom this charade could have been addressed, nor what sense it would have made to continue it for so long, as Maria Serena Mazzi observes. In Luisa Giordano's opinion, there is no reason to believe that his sentiment was not sincere. Even at the most critical moment, on the day he fled Milan, his last thought, according to Corio, was to visit his wife's grave before leaving.

"The inexorable death broke so many high principles, and in the meantime his glory and happiness were in conflict. Her death was universally mourned, not only by all Lombardy, but by all Italy and Christendom. Duke Ludovico, her consort, made, and makes every day, so many demonstrations of restless grief, that he will leave to every future century a memorable example of it".

— Vincenzo Calmeta, Triumphi.

As proof of the sincerity of the pain that this memory caused him, "which was so great, as it was said, that he used to beat his own head against the walls", it would suffice to mention the fact that Ambassador Costabili did not mention him at his wife's funeral, which would suggest that he had not moved from his bed; he did not even attend the commemoration of the anniversary of 1499, it was said, because he was suffering from "melancholy". Precisely on official occasions, that is, when he would have had the opportunity to make a public appearance, he missed it, preferring to mourn his wife in solitude. Several episodes, moreover, testify to Ludovico's constant terror of losing her: His constant presence in the bed of his gravely ill wife, whom he would not cease to embrace and kiss, to such an extent that he could become infected; his desire to know the cause of her every minor ailment, such as the sore throat that had troubled her in Venice in 1493; his plea to Francesco Gonzaga to save Beatrice from the very violent insurrection of the Germans in Novara, thinking of nothing but her safety. The fact that he loved her to such an extent, and the undeniable presence of lovers, is only a consequence of his passionate nature.

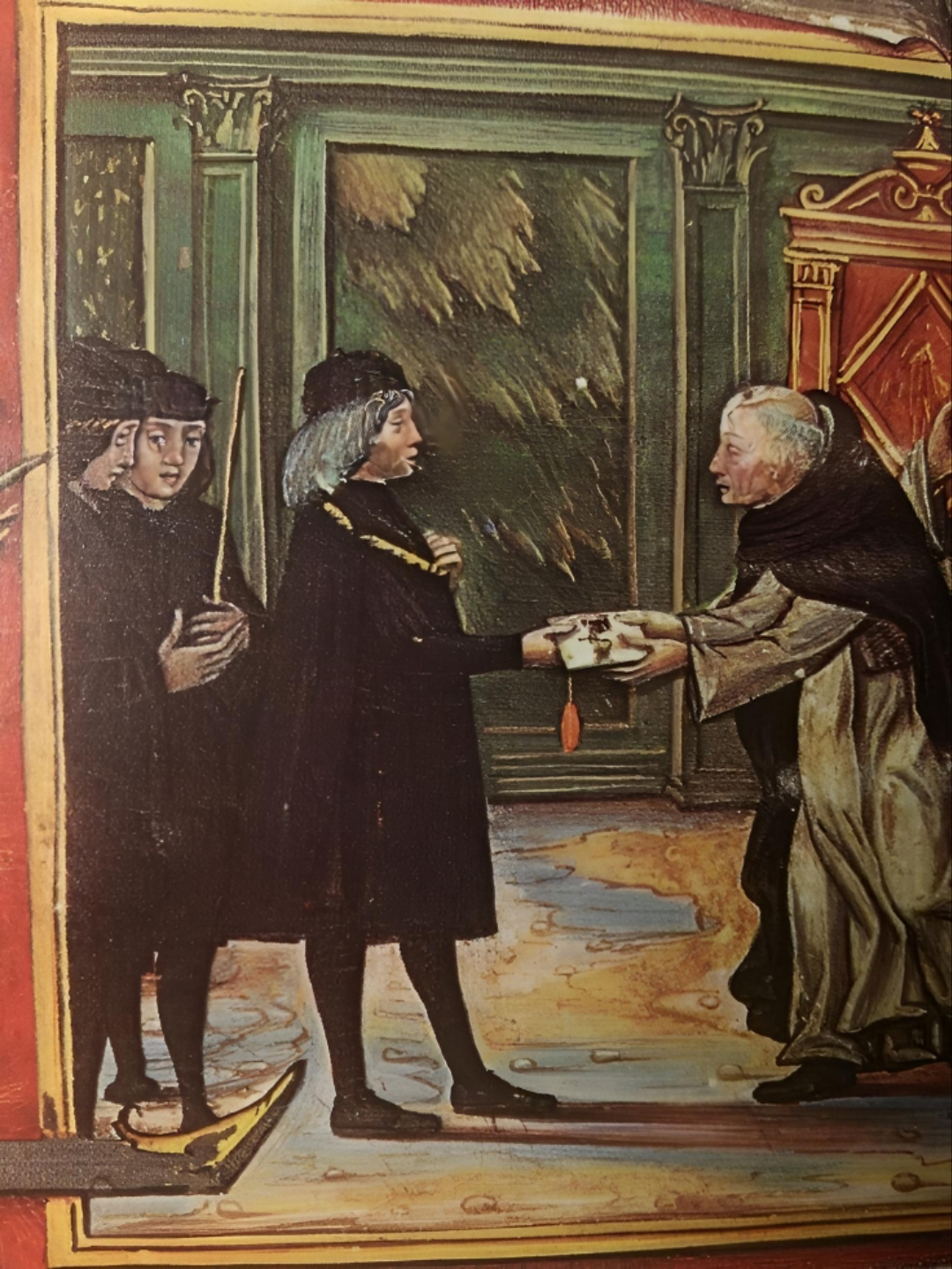
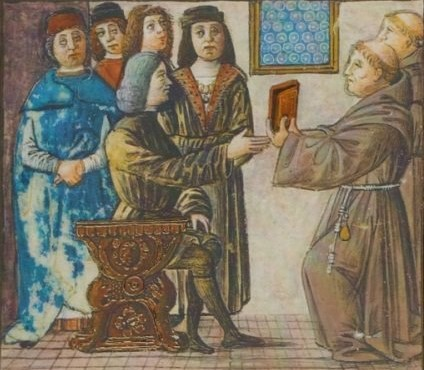
Moro's mourning: on the left, a miniature depicting Ludovico's deed of gift to the convent of S. Maria delle Grazie at the Villa Sforzesca, which once belonged to Beatrice (1497); on the right, Luca Pacioli presents De Divina Proportione to the duke (1498). The man next to Ludovico, also dressed in mourning, may be his son-in-law Galeazzo, recognizable by what looks like the necklace of the Order of St. Michael. Both of them continued to mourn after the end of the canonical year.

According to Robert de La Sizeranne, his despair was real, but not so much due to love as to the fact that Ludovico had made his wife a fetish, a lucky charm, because of her innate ability to triumph over everything and to "face danger with impunity [...] with a burst of laughter". He had not loved her as a partner and had been unfaithful to her as a husband, but he felt that Beatrice had a role that no other woman could ever play, that of a lucky star. For this reason, he took his wife with him everywhere and spared her no effort, even during her pregnancies. He separated from her only to send her on a diplomatic mission to Venice, and even there she brought him good fortune, but he urged everyone (relatives and Doge) to return home as soon as possible. "Almost all men who have made an unexpected rise, escaping many dangers, believe in their star: it was one of the weaknesses, especially of Ludovico il Moro. It was natural that for him this star was his wife. He had made his way to power without her, but it was from her that he traced his rise to the top, his power over all of Italy, his unprecedented prestige in Europe".

According to the reconstruction offered by biographer Silvia Alberti de Mazzeri, relations between the couple had already begun to deteriorate by 1495: Moro's vacillating politics had exposed all his weaknesses and contradictions, and Beatrice was no longer as attracted to him as she once had been. Ludovico, for his part, although he still loved her very much, no longer took pleasure in surprising with his generosity a woman who, now rich and powerful precisely because of his conspicuous donations, no longer needed him to satisfy her needs and therefore sought satisfaction elsewhere: with his poorer sister-in-law Isabella d'Este, whom he flattered with lavish gifts, and with his mistress Lucrezia Crivelli. The latter would have been no more than an outlet.

It is also significant that when Lucrezia gave birth to their son on 8 March, someone suggested that he be named Francesco, since he was born on the anniversary of the death of the Duke Francesco Sforza, but Ludovico immediately replied that he did not want to "insult" his late wife, as it would seem that he wanted to place the newborn above those he had by her.

"With Beatrice disappears a little creature who has lived an ephemeral life. From childhood to marriage, to the throne of one of the most powerful principalities in the world, without the slightest uncertainty or indecision. Yesterday she spoke to dolls, today to the Doge or to the King of France: as a child, and even as a woman, childlike and feminine, she resolved all difficulties by overcoming them, as when, like the fiercest and most courageous Amazon, she ran on horseback hunting in the woods of Vigevano and was wounded there".

— Giannetto Bongiovanni, Isabella d'Este marchesa di Mantova, 1960, p. 95.

=== Refusal of a second marriage ===
Ludovico apparently had a certain friendship with Chiara Gonzaga, sister of Marquis Francesco of Mantua, and after his wife's death someone went so far as to propose a marriage between the two: a Mantuan physician declared to a nobleman of Chiara's court that Ludovico had sent him to Mantua for the purpose of asking the woman to marry the marquis, and his daughter for his own firstborn. Upon learning of this, Ludovico hastened to clear up the misunderstanding, declaring that he knew no doctor and had no intention of remarrying, and indeed denied Chiara passage to Milan precisely so as not to create illusions, while confirming his friendship with her. "All the greater is my astonishment, for I have never sought, nor spoken, nor even thought of the Lady of Monpensero, or of any other, for then, having lost my most illustrious spouse, never did it occur to me to seek other wives; indeed, I refused the said Lady entry into Milan on her return to France" was Ludovico's official statement.

Similarly, he rejected the marriage proposals coming to him from Germany and Naples: Emperor Maximilian would have wanted his eldest son, Ercole Maximilian, to be betrothed to the sister of the Duke of Savoy, and for Ludovico to marry the daughter of the Marquis of Brandenburg. Ambassador Erasmo Brasca told the emperor that all insistence was useless, as the duke had no intention of remarrying, and Maximilian replied in scandal, "I cannot believe that the wise Duke, out of love for the happy memory of the Duchess, will refrain from doing what is necessary to increase the dignity of his house and the security of his state. This will not be good for the soul of the most illustrious Duchess". In short, he argued that such obstinacy would benefit neither his state nor the dead woman.

It was only when the situation became desperate, that is, with his banishment from Milan in 1499, that rumors spread that Ludovico had asked for the hand of one of the Sultan's daughters in order to obtain the Turk's alliance to regain the duchy, and that the negotiations had failed. Ludovico, however, always denied that he had ever negotiated with the Sultan.

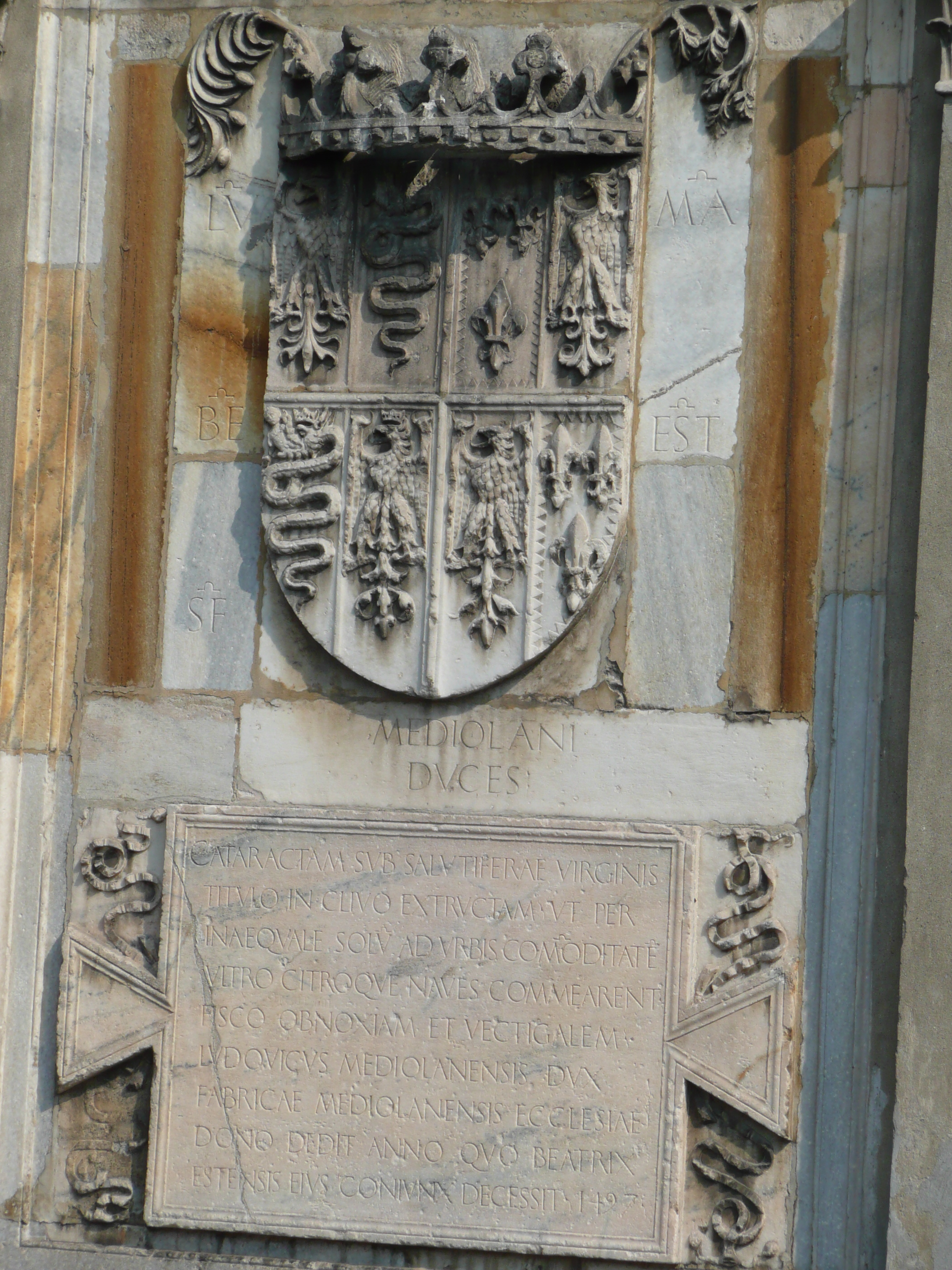
Plaque with the union of the Sforza and Este coats of arms, desired by Ludovico in memory of his wife. Conca di Viarenna, Milan, 1497

== Muratori's cryptic passage ==
The 18th-century historian Ludovico Antonio Muratori, in his Antichità Estensi, hints at the possibility of a crime:

"At the beginning of the year 1497, on January 2, Beatrice Estense [...], princess of beauty and high intellect, worthy of a greater life, ended her days in Milan with the birth of a dead child. The histories of Milan tell us that Lodovico loved her tenderly and was inconsolable at her death, and that the tributes paid to her, described by Corio, were most splendid. But those of Ferrara note that Lodovico was lost behind a maiden of the woman, and that for many months there was no communion of bed between them. Another adds that Beatrice was poisoned by Francesca dal Verme at the request of Galeazzo Sanseverino, as Francesca herself publicly declared after a few years on the verge of death. The reason is not mentioned, we can only note that, according to Corio's testimony, Bianca, Duke Lodovico's illegitimate daughter and Galeazzo Sanseverino's wife, had recently died. But as the rumors of the common people easily mix with these facts, I do not vouch for any of these secret news".

— Ludovico Muratori, Antichità Estensi

The somewhat vague passage received different interpretations over time. According to some historians, Muratori wanted to imply that Beatrice had poisoned Bianca Giovanna in revenge against Galeazzo Sanseverino, who provided his palace for the secret meetings between Ludovico and Lucrezia Crivelli, and that therefore Galeazzo had in the same way avenged himself. In truth, Beatrice loved Bianca Giovanna like a sister and could never have wished for her death. More likely, Muratori wanted to point out that if both young women were struck down by sudden death within a month, someone must have wanted to harm Moro.

=== Galeazzo Sanseverino ===
Similarly, it seems implausible that Galeazzo was responsible for the two deaths, since he showed great sorrow for both, and it is hard to see why he should have caused his own ruin by ruining his benefactors. The ambassador Antonio Costabili was impressed by the man's behavior during the Duchess's funeral, writing to Duke Ercole d'Este that "Lord Galeazo da San Severino did admirable things in demonstration, in words and in deeds, in sign of the affection he had for her, going out of his way to make known to everyone the virtues and goodness that reigned in that most illustrious lady."

Like his father-in-law, Galeazzo continued to wear mourning at least until 1498, explicitly for the duchess and not for his wife (who had also died two years earlier). Marin Sanudo then reports that even at the end of 1501, well after Ludovico's defeat, Galeazzo continued to dress in black and had even stopped cutting his hair (by then long to his belt): an image of depression and degradation for which the motivation is not made explicit, but which was perhaps directed at his father-in-law's imprisonment and his own sad condition as a vagabond.

The nineteenth-century historian Achille Dina insists on the strong "intimacy" between Beatrice and Galeazzo and suggests, without providing any concrete evidence, that the two were lovers, claiming that her deep grief over the death of her stepdaughter Bianca Giovanna was due to "some intimate remorse". (Note: "She, who was expecting another child, went every day to the church of S. Maria delle Grazie, where she spent long hours praying and crying at Bianca's grave. Mourning for the recent loss? Or for Ludovico's relationship with Crivelli? His biographer wonders. Or some intimate remorse that increased her anxiety for the coming birth? [Perhaps her behaviour towards Isabella? Or something in her relations with Bianca's husband, the charming Galeazzo Sanseverino, whose intrinsic and uninterrupted sharing of pleasures with her cannot fail to strike?" — Achille Dina, Isabella of Aragon, Duchess of Milan and Bari.)

While it is true that the two were often found paired together in games, hunts and matters of greater seriousness, it is equally true, however, that nothing would have been possible without the consent and encouragement of Ludovico himself, who was, moreover, almost always a co-participant in their amusements. An equally constant presence in the woman's life was Galeazzo Visconti, assigned to her by her husband as a sort of cavalier servente, and the near homonymy between the two men led some historians (including Dina himself, according to Cartwright) to believe that Beatrice was always in the company of the Sanseverino alone, while her courtship was quite varied. Apart from the undoubted friendship that bound her to Galeazzo – who, incidentally, was described by contemporaries as the lover of Duke Ludovico and not of the Duchess, although Sanudo assures us that he was also fond of women – Beatrice always showed herself to be a modest woman and faithful to her husband: none of the contemporaries ever hinted at her possible adultery, and nothing would suggest that she had an affair with Galeazzo or anyone else.

Muratori, a librarian of the Este family in Modena, but who had also worked at the Ambrosiana Library in Milan, mentions a certain chronicle, probably written in Ferrara, which would report the confession of the dying Dal Verme, but he does not provide any useful clues to clarify who was the author of the said chronicle, which is unknown today. Looking at the letter sent by Ambassador Costabili to Duke Ercole, Robert de La Sizeranne notes that the special mention of Galeazzo's grief is surprising, as if there were some reason to doubt it. This suggests that there were already malicious rumors that needed to be refuted. However, the author makes it clear that everything refutes the hypothesis of poisoning, and that the latter is not necessary to explain a death very common to so many young women. There is no evidence of Galeazzo's grudge against the Duchess, and Ludovico, who would have had the means, never thought of opening an investigation. "Far from showing the slightest estrangement from Galeazzo, he lavished him with his favors".

=== Ercole d'Este ===
Duke Ercole, on the other hand, had a reputation as a serial poisoner, having been accused several times over the years of poisoning or attempting to poison his nephew Niccolò, his wife Eleanor, his son-in-law Francesco Gonzaga, and even Ludovico, who was guilty of opposing his policies. This, at least, was the rumor circulating in 1487, when Ludovico was reduced to the point of death by a strange illness characterized by severe stomach pains, which kept him bedridden for nearly a year and killed two of his cherished children in a matter of days. The case of multiple deaths in the Sforza family was repeated in 1496, when as many as three of his illegitimate children – Leone, Bianca, and a third – died shortly before a similar fate befell Beatrice. This time, however, no one seems to have linked the event to Duke Ercole, even though Beatrice had already adopted a pro-Venetian and pro-imperial policy in 1495, while her father had remained on the French side. He proclaimed a public mourning in Ferrara, forbidding all the usual festivities of the year, but on the other hand all his utilitarian logic appears in the letters of condolence: To his son-in-law he wrote that he had loved Beatrice "for her singular condition and virtue, more tenderly than any other of our children" and that her untimely death had caused him "a sorrow as great as we have never felt before", but that he was much more concerned about the psycho-physical condition of Ludovico, since if he were to die of grief or suffer from it "we would consider it a much greater loss than this." To his sister-in-law, the Queen of Hungary, he spoke instead of the "great sorrow and bitterness" caused by the loss of his daughter, who, placed in such a remarkable position by marriage, could have brought him many advantages: "Since my daughter was endowed with high manners and excellent virtue, I hoped that she would bear good fruit [...] but now she is gone and I am left without her, and I cannot console myself for this".

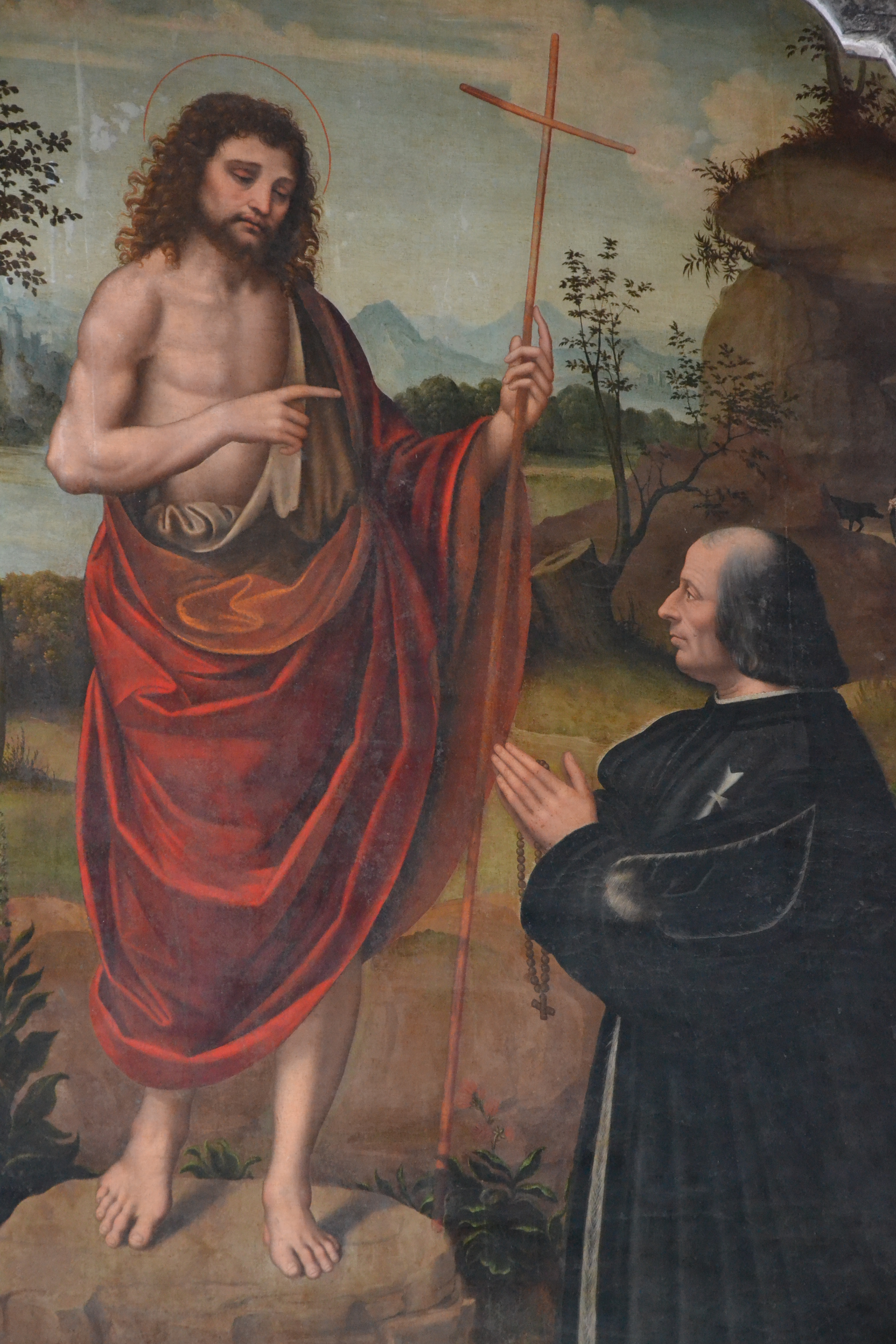
Chapel of St. John the Baptist, altarpiece by Marco d'Oggiono. Possibly a portrait of Ludovico in mourning.

=== Francesca Dal Verme ===
Based on archival research by the Voghera historian Fabrizio Bernini, this mysterious poisoner Francesca Dal Verme turns out to be the illegitimate daughter of Pietro Dal Verme, born – like her brother Francesco – to a woman of low social standing. Both children, Francesco and Francesca (who are not mentioned in the Litta and other noble archives because they were illegitimate), were entrusted to the widow Chiara Sforza with the ducal appanage after the death of their father.

It was rumored at the time that Pietro dal Verme had not died of natural causes, but had been poisoned by his own wife, Chiara Sforza, at the behest of Moro, who had in fact confiscated his property to the detriment of the Count's children, leaving the entire estate of the deceased, with the exception of Bobbio, to his son-in-law Galeazzo, while Bianca Giovanna received Voghera as a dowry. It is therefore plausible that both members of the Dal Verme family harbored deep resentments towards the Sforza. In fact, Bianca Giovanna, having recovered, suffered a relapse after going to the county of Voghera, where the aforementioned Francesca was probably still living.

After the French conquest of the Duchy of Milan in 1499, the Dal Verme family, with mixed fortunes, managed to reoccupy the fiefs that had been taken from them, until they settled there permanently after the death of Galeazzo Sanseverino. Galeazzo's half-brother Giulio filed a lawsuit against them in an attempt to recover the lands, but without success.

== Funeral ==
Two lead coffins were provided: one for the mother and a small one for the newborn. The funeral was "as pompous, pious and splendid as can be said". The Duchess's body was escorted to the church of Santa Maria delle Grazie by a large number of religious, nobles, commoners and resident ambassadors, all dressed in mourning and carrying such a quantity of pure white wax torches "that it was astonishing." The robes and fabrics that adorned the bier and the body of the deceased were woven in gold, which also had symbolic value, gold being the most precious and incorruptible of metals.

The echo of the event was enormous and perhaps exceeded the reality of the facts. As the anonymous Ferrarese noted, "incredible things were said to those who had not seen them", starting with the repetition of the wedding ceremony performed by Moro on the coffin of the deceased, which does not appear in Ambassador Costabili's account.

At Ludovico's request, a hundred torches were lit day and night for many days, and for a whole month a hundred masses were celebrated daily for her soul. Solemn funeral rites were then repeated in various other cities, such as Ferrara and Ala, at the behest of the Duke Ercole and the Emperor respectively. Bernardino Zambotti writes that her "death was a great sorrow for her father and for the whole city, because she was a pleasant person, virtuous and much loved by all the people, and very generous to her servants".

=== Commemorations ===
On 3 January 1498, the first solemn commemoration was held, which was expected to be a state event: Ludovico wrote to all the cities of the duchy that he wanted the celebrations to be splendid, not only because of the "singular love we have for her" but also because of the importance of Beatrice at his side. He attended the ceremony in Santa Maria delle Grazie, while he wanted Galeazzo Sanseverino to attend the ceremony in the Cathedral in his place. It is known that on this occasion 'the coffin containing the body of the venerable and illustrious Duchess' was exposed at the Grazie. Ambassador Antonio Costabili commented that "this commemoration [...] was one of the most stupendous and wonderful things that could be achieved. I do not think that in Christianity it could be done in a more splendid and dignified way". Throughout the day, Ludovico "did not want to be burdened with anything else in the world, except this, since he was confined to this monastery without admitting ambassadors or other people".

The celebrations were repeated in a similar form for the anniversary of 1499, but Ludovico was unable to attend, suffering from "melancholy".

== The mystery of the burial ==
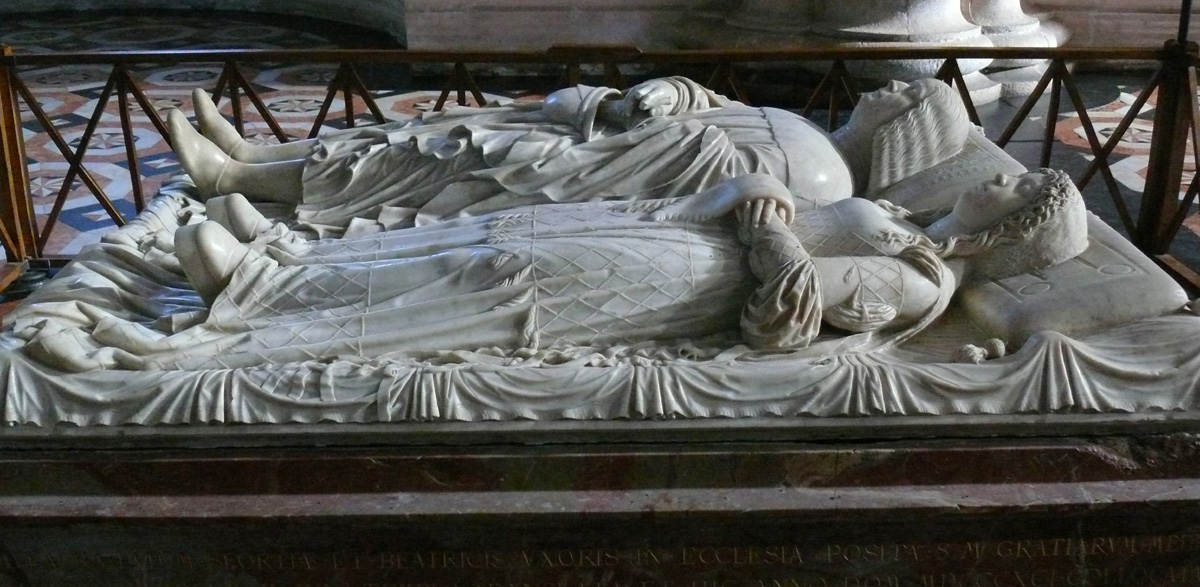
The cenotaph tomb cover of Ludovico and Beatrice at the Certosa di Pavia.

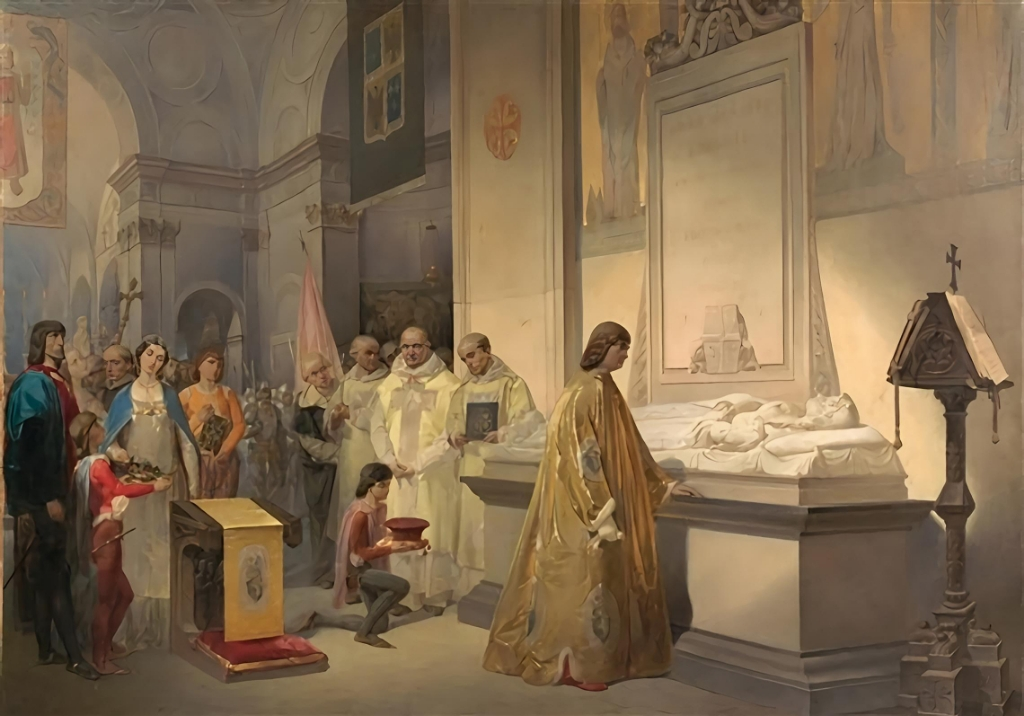
Duke Ludovico visits his wife's tomb in the church of Santa Maria delle Grazie, Alessandro Reati, between 1850 and 1873.

After the impressive funeral, Beatrice was buried in the choir of the Grazie. Ludovico immediately commissioned Cristoforo Solari to create the magnificent funeral monument with their two lying figures carved in marble, but due to the French conquest of the duchy, it remained unfinished. However, it was already largely erected in the apse of the church. Following the provisions of the Council of Trent on burials (1564), due to the excessive zeal of Cardinal Borromeo, it was broken up and largely dispersed. Only the lid with the burial statues, due to the piety of the Carthusian monks, was saved, being purchased for the meager sum of 38 scudi and transferred empty to the Certosa di Pavia, where it still stands today.

It, however, was never used: Beatrice's tomb remained the one placed above two corbels in the chancel of the church, "enlevée en haut très richement," according to the testimony of Pasquier le Moyne, who saw it in 1515. It, too, following the Council's provisions, was buried, but it is not known where. According to Luca Beltrami, Beatrice's body was laid at the back of the choir, under the same stone that covered her stepchildren Leone, Sforza, and Bianca, in the place where by tradition people continued to incense on the day of the commemoration of the dead.

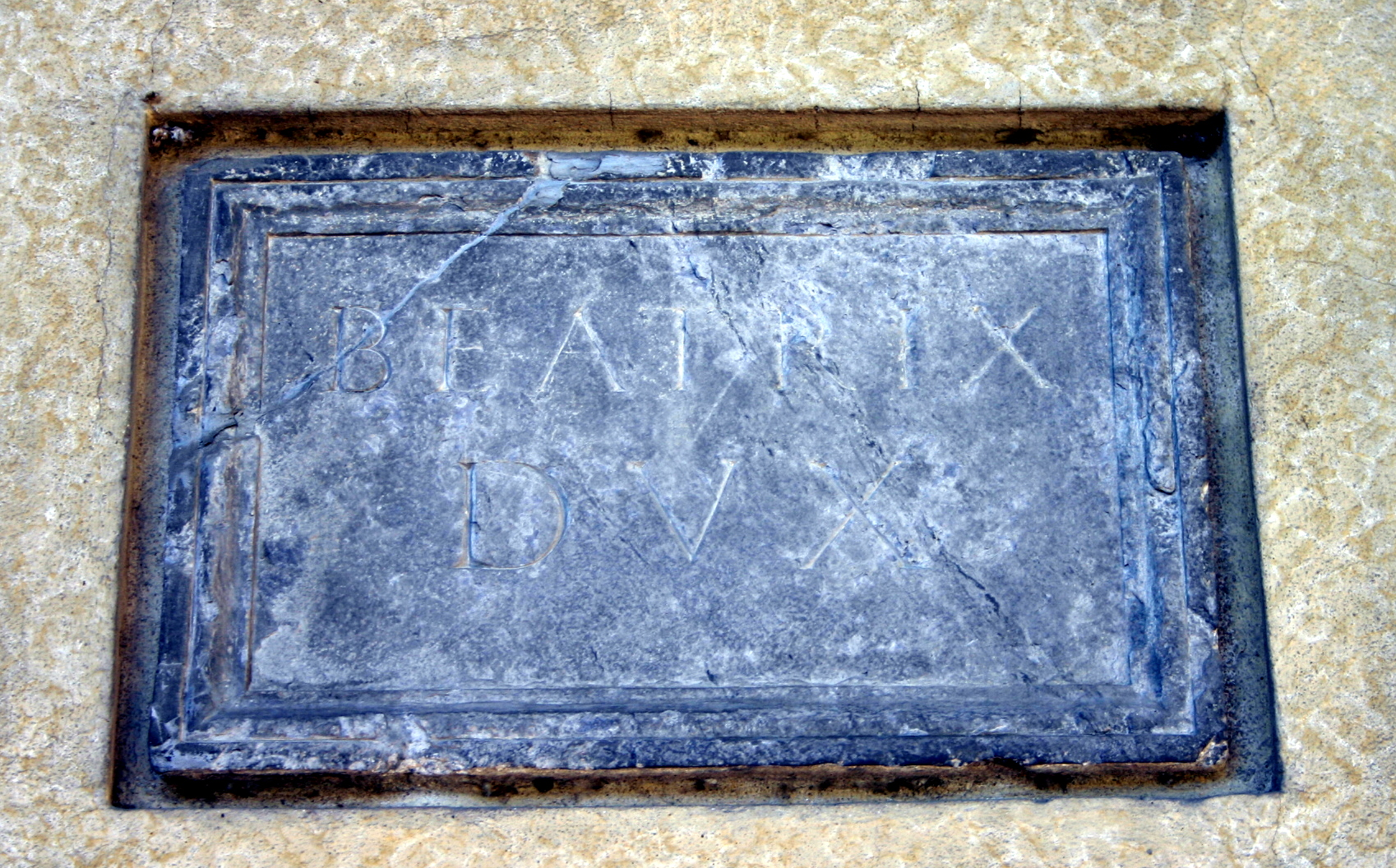
Plaque with the inscription Beatrix dux in the cloister of Santa Maria delle Grazie, formerly indicating the exact location of Beatrice's relics at the back of the choir of the same church.

In November 1935, during some work on the support of the dome of Santa Maria delle Grazie, a prolonged inward excavation of the right side of the high altar led to the discovery of a burial trench from which some bones were extracted. Also unearthed was a lead chest 180 centimeters long, much wider on the shoulder side than on the foot side, with an upper longitudinal opening that would show how it had already been tampered with in unspecified times. The metal case was protected by an additional wooden one, of which some remains were left. Inside was found a skull still bearing a few strands of dark hair arranged in small braids, a few other bones, and fragments of cloth and gold-woven lace. All these elements, and especially the material of the chest – lead – reserved for prominent figures, gave reason to believe that this was the burial of a lady, perhaps Beatrice herself. The gash in the lid and the lack of any ornamentation confirm that the chest was violated and despoiled of its precious objects. The size of the top would indicate that the deceased was pompously dressed. It is indeed known that Beatrice had been placed in a lead chest lined with wood and cloth, and dressed in her finest gold camora. However, a medallion found in the chest with the effigy of St. Charles Borromeo, canonized in 1610, suggests that the burial must have belonged to that era, unless the medallion had fallen out or had been placed inside at a later time. Careful studies of the bone remains led to the conclusion that the corpse had been inhumed for more than two hundred years and that it belonged to a woman whose stature must have been around 1.60 m., but who was certainly over fifty years old, so identification with Beatrice is to be ruled out.

The son, having not been baptized, could not be placed with his mother in the tomb. Therefore, a distraught Ludovico had him buried above the door of the cloister of Santa Maria delle Grazie with a Latin epitaph, which to some seemed rancorous. (Note: Infelix partus, amisi ante vitam quam in lucem ederer: infoelicior quod matri moriens vitam ademi et parentem consorte suo orbavi. In tam adverso fato hoc solum mihi potest iucundum esse, quod divi parentes me Lodovicus et Beatrix Mediolanenses duces genuere, MCCCCXCVII, tertio nonas januarii O unhappy birth! I lost my life before I was born: even more unfortunate is the fact that in dying I took the life of my mother and deprived my father of his wife. In such a miserable fate, the only consolation I can find is that I was begotten by my divine parents, Ludovico and Beatrice, Dukes of Milan. 1497, 2 January)

Precise indications about the burial are also offered by the Mantuan ambassador, providing among other things the invaluable information that it took place only a year after his death:

Yesterday the Duke had already buried, in the wall of a door of the Cloister of the Grazie, which is not sacred, but is the door that leads to the second sacred cloister, the dead little child that the Duchess gave birth to. With this epitaph, written in gold on a black field, I send your Lordship an example [...].

— Benedetto Capilupi to Isabella d'Este, letter of January 21, 1498.

Traces of this burial were also lost. Ludovico died in captivity in Loches, France, and there he is still believed to be buried. Gustave Clausse, Beatrice's biographer, provides (albeit with some discrepancy in comparison with other historians) some more information about the burials: interpreting the testimony of Paquier le Moyne that at Beatrice's feet was "notre Seigneur en tombeau," Clausse argued that Ludovico's corpse had been redeemed by his son Maximilian (after the recovery of the duchy in 1512) and laid to rest in the family mausoleum, and that the new duke had taken care to finish the funerary statues of his father and mother shortly before 1515. Other historians judged more simply that at Beatrice's feet was a statue of Christ in the tomb, also by Solari.

Clausse also provides, however, the interesting news that the black marble tomb slab with the inscription Beatrix dux was the sign placed to indicate, still in the late 1800s, the exact location of Beatrice's relics in the back of the choir, moved there after the Council of Trent. The plaque was removed around the time of the historian's writing and embedded in the outer wall of the small choir adjacent to the church, where it remains today.

== Political consequences ==
"Beatrice wisely advised her husband in the duties, not merely of a prince, but of an Italian prince; and so long as such a woman stood by Lodovico, the state prospered. When she died, public ruin had no restraint."

— Orlando Furioso, with historical and philological notes.

Most historians agree that Ludovico, who was fearful by nature, used to draw all courage from his consort, and that Beatrice had been his salvation in the summer of 1495, when he was on the verge of losing his state as a result of the aggression of Duke Louis of Orleans, who was defeated during the troubled siege of Novara. Soon after his wife's death, the signs of Ludovico's unpopularity began: alliances dissolved, sovereigns drifted apart one by one, and ambassadors were no longer able to procure him aid. "Soon he could count only on states that were also weak and threatened: Naples, Forli and Bologna, that is, on nothing." Ludovico had always been convinced that he would die before her and in his abilities he had pinned all his hopes for the maintenance of the state during his sons' minority.

"And in truth, the death of Beatrice, the splendid and intelligent Ferrarese, was a great misfortune for Ludovico il Moro. She was the soul of all his undertakings, she was the true queen of his heart and his court [...]. If the Duke of Bari [...] succeeded in presenting on the European stage a scene far superior to his condition, it was largely due to this woman, vainly feminine, if you like, and cruel, especially with the Duchess Isabella, but of resolute and tenacious character, of ready wit, of a soul open to all the seductions of luxury and all the attractions of art. When she [...] failed [...] it was like a great storm that came to shake Ludovico's soul. He never recovered from it; that death was the beginning of his unhappiness. He was haunted by gloomy premonitions; it seemed to him that he was alone in a great stormy sea, and he inclined, in fear, to asceticism. [...] The ghost of his beautiful and poor dead wife was always before the spirit."

— Rodolfo Renier, Gaspare Visconti

Emperor Maximilian, in a letter of condolence, acknowledged Beatrice's role as an ally of her husband. (Note: Nihil enim nobis hoc tempore gravius aut molestius accidere poterat, quam affine inter caeteras principes nobis gratissima, post initam uberiorem virtutum illius consuetudinem, tam repente privari, te vero qui a nobis apprime diligeris, non modo dulci coniuge, sed principatus tui socia, et curarum et occupationum tuarum levamine destitui. [...] Felicissimae coniugi tuae nullam vel fortunae vel corporis vel animi bonum desiderari a quocumque potuit; nullus decor, nulla dignitas addi [...] Nothing worse or more distressing could have happened to us at this time than to be so abruptly deprived of a consort among other princesses dear to us, after we had begun to become more familiar with their virtues, and that you, whom we love most of all, should be deprived not only of a sweet consort, but also of an ally of your principality, of the relief of your cares and occupations. [...] Your most fortunate spouse lacked no virtue of fortune, body or soul, which could be desired by anyone; no dignity, no merit which could be added. — Letter of condolence from Maximilian I of Habsburg to Ludovico Sforza)

"Maximilian, in qualifying Beatrice as bound to the principality, could not have foreseen the disasters that would follow the rupture of that bond. Ludovico il Moro, dragged without guidance or support by events beyond his control, experienced only misfortune. His defection from the French alliance cost him his crown and his freedom."

In a similar vein, the humanist Niccolò Lugaro, in his eulogy, called her "a sure foundation of the reign", "not so much a virgin as a virago", emphasising her role as a guide and adviser, and regretting that she had died at such a delicate time for her husband. (Note: Weep, citizens, as if deprived of the only refuge, and lament, women, that the supreme delight of the female sex is lost. She was, oh, my most afflicted Ludovico Caesar, the one whom, even in your absence, I would call the companion of the sublime bed; she was the relief from the afflictions with which you were afflicted in the ranks of the soldiers; she was the participant in every secret; she was the simulacrum of that supreme prudence; she was the one with extraordinary foresight and justice, who judged everything rightly, who decided to remedy everything with fair balance.... In short, I would have believed that in her I saw all the works accomplished by the genius of nature, which to you, O most gentle prince, seem to have been taken away by a hasty death, and you feel yourself deprived of both eyes and of that sweet conversation. [She died with those who survived her, while the state was flourishing, while Ludovico, her most faithful husband, was reigning; it would be unjust for her life to be snatched away in such a whirlwind, while the transalpine army is tumultuous on all sides. If he holds out, we have nothing to fear: centuries of gold are to be hoped for. [...] — Niccolò Lugaro, Deploratio illustrissime Beatricis domine nostra vita functe etc.)

The people of Faenza were greatly disturbed by her death, as they feared that Astorre Manfredi would lose favour with Milan: Faenza, which was pro-Venetian, was the enemy of Forlì, which was pro-Florentine and whose mistress was Catherina Sforza, Ludovico's niece. Beatrice must have persuaded her husband to extend his protection to Faenza, and it was feared that her death would lead to a shift in alliances, which in fact happened with the War of Pisa, when Ludovico abandoned his ally Venice for Florence, a move that later led to his downfall. Malipiero, on the other hand, rejoiced, saying, "and with this death so much intelligence will cease that son-in-law and father-in-law have had together", meaning that without Beatrice's interlude, the collaboration between Ludovico and his father-in-law, Ercole d'Este of Ferrara, would have come to a definitive end.

From that same January 1497, Ludovico began to fear the loss of his state, but the situation worsened when, in 1498, King Charles VIII of France died childless and the Duke of Orleans succeeded him as Louis XII. In 1499 the latter returned a second time to claim the duchy of Milan, and with Beatrice gone, he had no difficulty in dealing with the disheartened Moro, who, after an escape and a brief return, ended his days as a prisoner in France.

Lodovico, who had drawn all his strength of mind from the provident and strong advice of his bride, Beatrice d'Este, who had been taken from him by death some years before, found himself so isolated and so lacking in courage that he saw no other way out of the fierce storm that threatened him but to flee. And so he did.

— Raffaele Altavilla, Breve compendio di storia Lombarda

== Cultural influence ==
Ah, a harsh, immature and sudden accident! | A birth full of sorrow, full of death, | that caused such a matutinal accident! | The innocent child, ah, harsh fate, | was condemned to the tartareous gates; | but she, as reward for all her toil, | gave the soul to heaven in the immature age, | and the chaste body to the great ancient mother. | As for glory, she lived beyond measure, | dying old in her vigorous age, | though she lived little in nature [...] (I, 67–78)

— Vincenzo Calmeta, Triumphi.

=== Literature ===
The literary productions in memory of the deceased were numerous: Her secretary, Vincenzo Calmeta, composed for her the Triumphi, a poem in terza rima inspired by Petrarch and Dante, in which the poet mourns the Duchess's premature death and prays to Death to allow him to follow her, railing against the cruelty of fate and the misery of the human condition, until Beatrice herself descends from heaven to console him, to disabuse him of his "past error" and to show him that in truth everything happens according to divine justice. The poet, moved and overwhelmed, then addresses her with this invocation:

My divine soul and my earthly sun, | I said with tears in my eyes, | Oh, how it pains me to live without you! | For by losing you I have lost all desire, | your death has destroyed all hope, | and I do not know where to stop my thoughts. [...]

— Triumphi (III, 79–84)

In the collection of poems dedicated to her by Gaspare Visconti, a sonnet introduced by the heading "for the death of the Duchess and for the danger in which this country is placed" already shows an awareness of the impending ruin of the state caused by Moro's despair at the loss of his wife: "and my country makes me very afraid | for every building | falls when the foundation is lacking".

Antonio Grifo wrote as many as eleven sonnets on her death, Serafino Aquilano four, as did other poets, including Niccolò da Correggio, (Note: Sonnet written after seeing a portrait of the Most Illustrious Duchess: "If your eyes show how much you were alive, / being dead as you are, they will see nothing, / but the invisible parts of you will remain, / though the worldly will be taken away in this age. / I praise the painter, but I praise more the one who writes / for the future what the present knows / and in the seventeenth year / death extinguished every good that flourished in you. / But as the brush surpasses your form, / so the pen will surpass your virtues, / and both will remain imperfect". (Miscellanea, Volume 207, 1892, p. 17).) Timoteo Bendedei, and Cornelio Balbo. Michele Marullo composed an Epitaphium Beatricis Estensis. (Note: Solverat Eridanus tumidarum flumina aquarum. | Solverat, et populis non levis horror erat, | Quippe gravis Pyrrhae metuentes tempora cladis, | Credebant simili crescere flumen aqua. | Ille dolor fuerat saevus lacrimaeque futuri | Funeris et iustis dona paranda novis: | Scilicet et fluvios tangunt tua acerba, Beatrix, | Funera, nedum homines moestaque corda viri. The Eridanos had cleared the raging waters from the rivers. | It had freed them, and there was fear among the peoples, | for fearing the times of Pyrrhus' heavy defeats, | they believed that the river would grow with such waters. | This grief was cruel, and [there were] tears of the future, | a funeral, and gifts had to be prepared for the new rites: | and surely your bitter death touches the rivers, Beatrice, | and all the more the men and the afflicted heart of your husband. — Michele Marullo Tarcaniota, Epitaphium Beatricis Estensis.)

Antonio Cammelli, known as Pistoia, sent Moro twenty-six sonnets and a long composition in terza rima known as "La Disperata" to console him for the death of "your dear wife, beloved by you on earth, Beatrice, who is now in heaven among the chaste martyrs". In the Disperata, the poet expresses his lament in the voice of Ludovico himself:

The bare earth has already put on its mantle, | tender and green, and every heart rejoices, | and now I begin my weeping. | The trees take leaves, I wear a black robe. | [...] The world is at peace, I alone remain at war, | the sun shines and illuminates, | it seems to me that it is night, and I feel that I am under the earth. [...] The others warm themselves in the sun, I burn in the fire, | the others long to live, to be happy, | with every step I call more for death. [...]. | Like an animal resting by the caves, | Under a branch or a stick, | I mourn my hopes all broken, | every slope is green and I am dry. | [...] O false world, O blind and varied world! | Hopeless love, deceitful love, | so bitter to me, so contrary to me! | Now that I hoped to be at peace with you, | you have robbed me of all good, of all joy! | And I weep and weep, and all the world is silent. | What greater insult, or what greater wickedness, | could you have done to me? You have taken from me the one who raised my intellect to the heavens! | [...] Why did I not have the feathers of Daedalus? | Who never was so early a flying bird, | As I would be in following my lost light. | [...] This is she who scorches my heart and impairs me, | neither Apollo, nor Asclepius, nor Avicenna, | cannot heal my mortal wound. | It was the beginning of so much pain, | and it can be the end and the only remedy | for the cruel blow that leads me to death. | [...] Hear, gentle soul that torments me, | Hear my weeping, |Hear, bitter sorrow, |Hear someone who complains for your cause. | | Hear him who does not see the clear sun, | Hear him who rejects life, | Hear him to whom death is clear. | You have made me blind, deaf and dumb, | I speak to the wind, to the exits, to the windows, | everyone laughs at me and does not help me. [...]

— Antonio Cammelli known as Pistoia, La Disperata.

Ignazio Cantù's novel Beatrice or the Court of Lodovico il Moro focuses on her death, albeit with considerable historical inconsistencies.

=== Art ===
Moro's deep grief over the departure of his wife was depicted in paintings by two painters of the Romantic movement, Giovan Battista Gigola and Alessandro Reati.

=== In mass culture ===
The episode is depicted in two television series, The Life of Leonardo da Vinci and Leonardo, although the latter has some strong anachronisms due to the absence of a midwife.

=== Legends ===
It is said that Ludovico built a secret underground passage that led directly from the castle to Santa Maria delle Grazie so that he could visit his wife in peace.

== See also ==
- Beatrice d'Este
- Triumphi (Vincenzo Calmeta)

== Bibliography ==
- Silvia Alberti de Mazzeri (1986). Beatrice d'Este duchessa di Milano. Rusconi.
- Anonimo ferrarese (1928). Giuseppe Pardi (ed.). Diario ferrarese. Vol. fasc. 1, vol. 24. Zanichelli.
- Altavilla, Raffaele (1878). Breve compendio di storia Lombarda. Vol. 1 & 2. G. Messaggi.
- Luca Beltrami (1891). Statue funerarie di Lodovico il Moro e di Beatrice d'Este alla certosa di Pavia.
- Julia Mary Cartwright (1945). Beatrice d'Este, Duchessa di Milano. Translated by A. G. C. Milano: Edizioni Cenobio.
- Vincenzo Calmeta (2004). Rossella Guberti (ed.). Triumphi. Bologna: Commissione per i testi di lingua.
- Bernardino Corio (1565). L'Historia di Milano. Giorgio de' Cavalli.
- Luisa Giordano (2008). Beatrice d'Este (1475–1497). Vol. 2. ETS.
- Alessandro Giulini (1912). "Bianca Sanseverino Sforza". Archivio Storico Lombardo serie IV. Vol. 18. Milano: Libreria Bocca.
- Alessandro Luzio; Rodolfo Renier (1890). Delle relazioni d'Isabella d'Este Gonzaga con Lodovico e Beatrice Sforza. Milano: Tipografia Bortolotti di Giuseppe Prato.
- Francesco Malaguzzi Valeri (1913). La corte di Lodovico il Moro: la vita privata e l'arte a Milano nella seconda metà del Quattrocento. Vol. 1. Milano: Hoepli.
- Francesco Malaguzzi Valeri (1917). La corte di Lodovico il Moro: gli artisti Lombardi. Vol. 2. Hoepli.
- Carlo Mòrbio (1834). Storia di Novara dalla dominazione de' Farnesi sino all'età nostra contemporanea. G. Ferrario.
- Ludovico Antonio Muratori (1988). Cassa di Risparmio di Vignola (ed.). Delle antichità estensi. Vol. 2. Arti Grafiche Tamari.
- Jean de Préchac (1817). Storia di Clarice Visconti, duchessa di Milano. Translated by G. Agrati. Giusti.
- Marin Sanudo (1879). I diarii di Marino Sanuto: (MCCCCXCVI-MDXXXIII) dall'autografo Marciano ital. cl. VII codd. CDXIX-CDLXXVII. Vol. 1. F. Visentini.
- Gustavo Uzielli (1890). Leonardo da Vinci e tre gentildonne milanesi del secolo XV. Tipografia sociale.
- Pietro Verri (1835). Storia di Milano. Vol. tomo II. Societa tipografica de' classici italiani.
- Bernardino Zambotti. Giuseppe Pardi (ed.). Diario ferrarese dall'anno 1476 sino al 1504. Zanichelli.
- Domenico Malipiero (1843). Francesco Longo (ed.). Annali veneti dall'anno 1457 al 1500. Agostino Sagredo.
- Caterina Santoro (1994). Gli Sforza, la casata nobiliare che resse il ducato di Milano dal 1450 al 1535. Tea Storica.
- Antonella Grati; Arturo Pacini, eds. (2003). Carteggio degli oratori mantovani alla corte sforzesca (1495–1498). Ministero per i beni e le attività culturali, Ufficio centrale per i beni archivistici.
- Paolo Negri (1923). Studi sulla crisi italiana alla fine del secolo XV (in Archivio storico lombardo). Società storica lombarda.
- Daniela Pizzagalli (1999). La dama con l'ermellino, vita e passioni di Cecilia Gallerani nella Milano di Ludovico il Moro. Rizzoli.
