= Gamurra =

Italian style of women's dress popular in the 15th and early 16th centuries

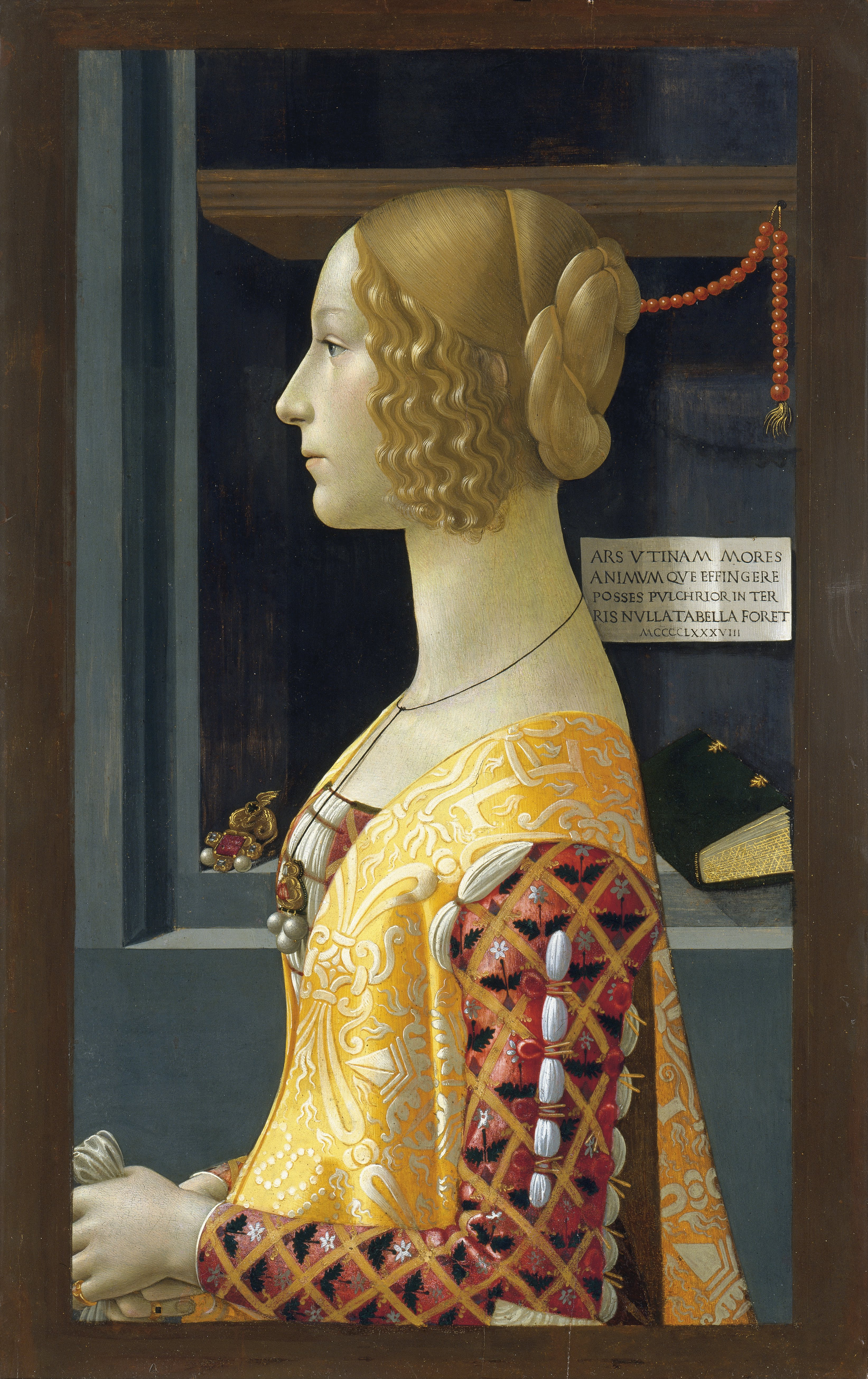
Portrait of Giovanna Tornabuoni, 1488, by Domenico Ghirlandaio. A woman wearing a gamurra underneath a giornea.

A gamurra was an Italian style of women's dress popular in the fifteenth and early sixteenth centuries. It could also be called a camurra or camora in Florence or a zupa, zipa, or socha in northern Italy. It consisted of a fitted bodice and full skirt worn over a chemise (called a camicia). It was usually unlined.

The gamurra probably developed from a fourteenth-century garment called the gonna, gonnella, or sottana. Early styles were front-laced, but the fashion later changed to side-laced styles. The fashion for sleeves also changed: though sleeves earlier in the fifteenth century are attached to the bodice, after 1450, they are usually detached and laced or pinned to the bodice.

The gamurra could be worn on its own in the home or in an informal setting; in a formal setting, it would typically be worn underneath an overdress such as a giornea or a cioppa.

== Gallery ==
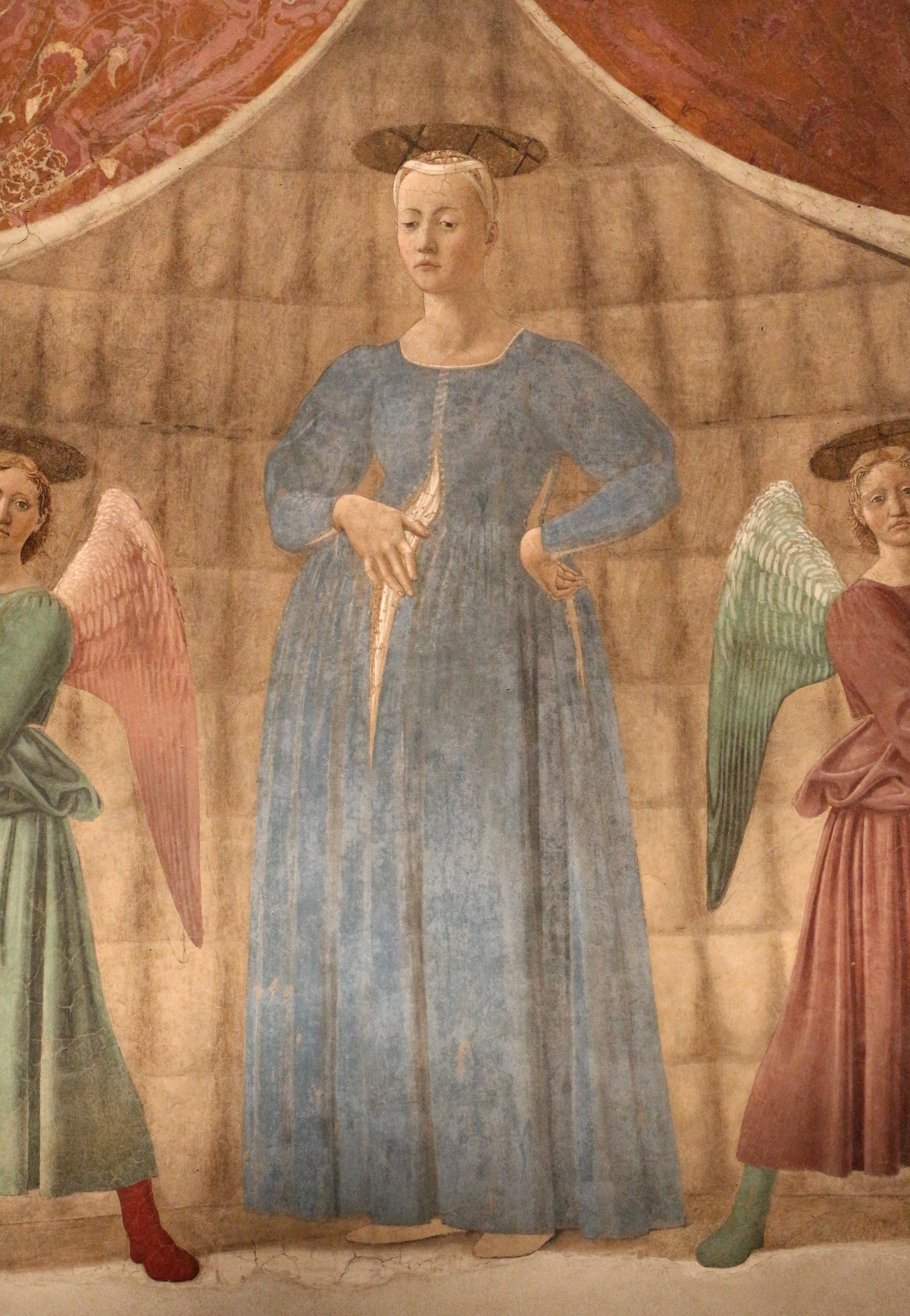
Madonna del Parto, c.. 1455, by Piero della Francesca. This image shows a gamurra laced in front and at the side, used here to regulate the size of the gamurra during pregnancy.

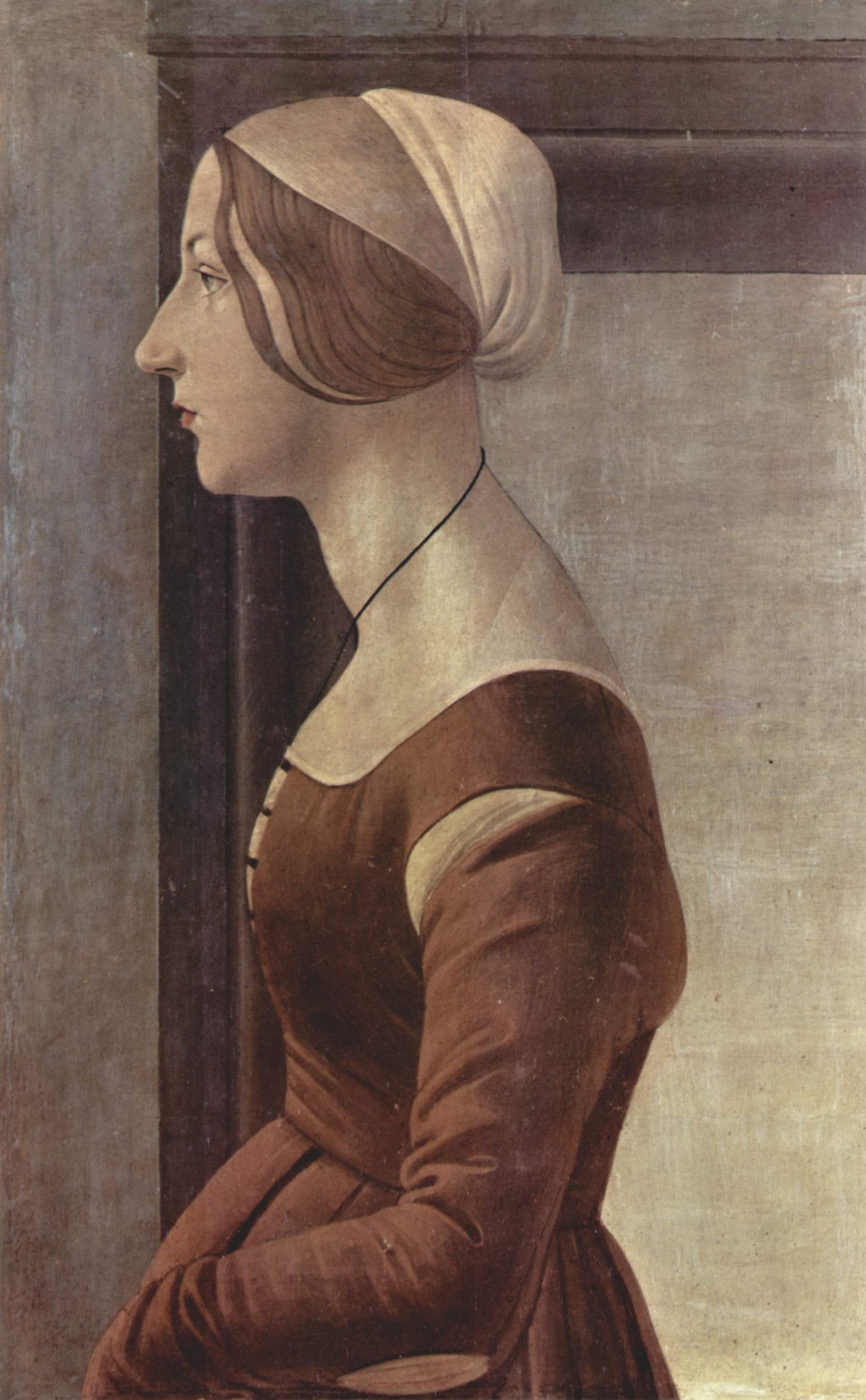
Portrait of a Woman, c. 1475, by Sandro Botticelli. A woman wearing a brown gamurra.

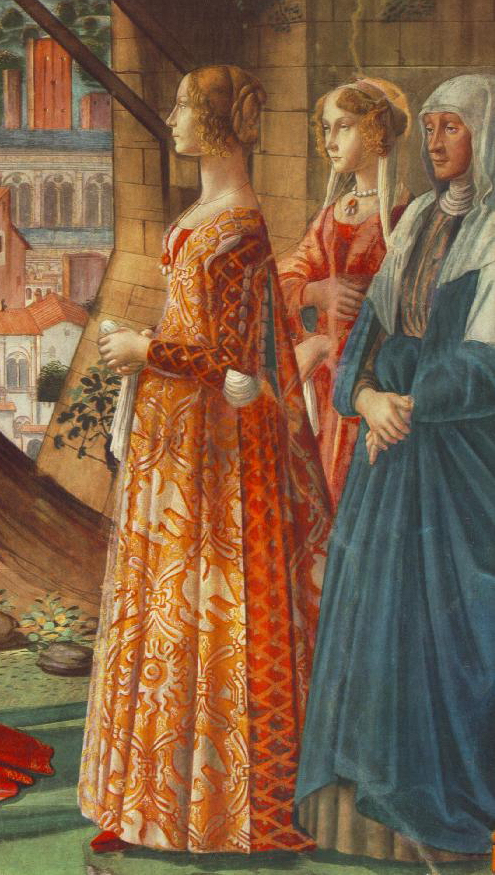
The Visitation (detail), c. 1488, by Domenico Ghirlandaio. A full-length image of Giovanna Tornabuoni wearing a gamurra and giornea.

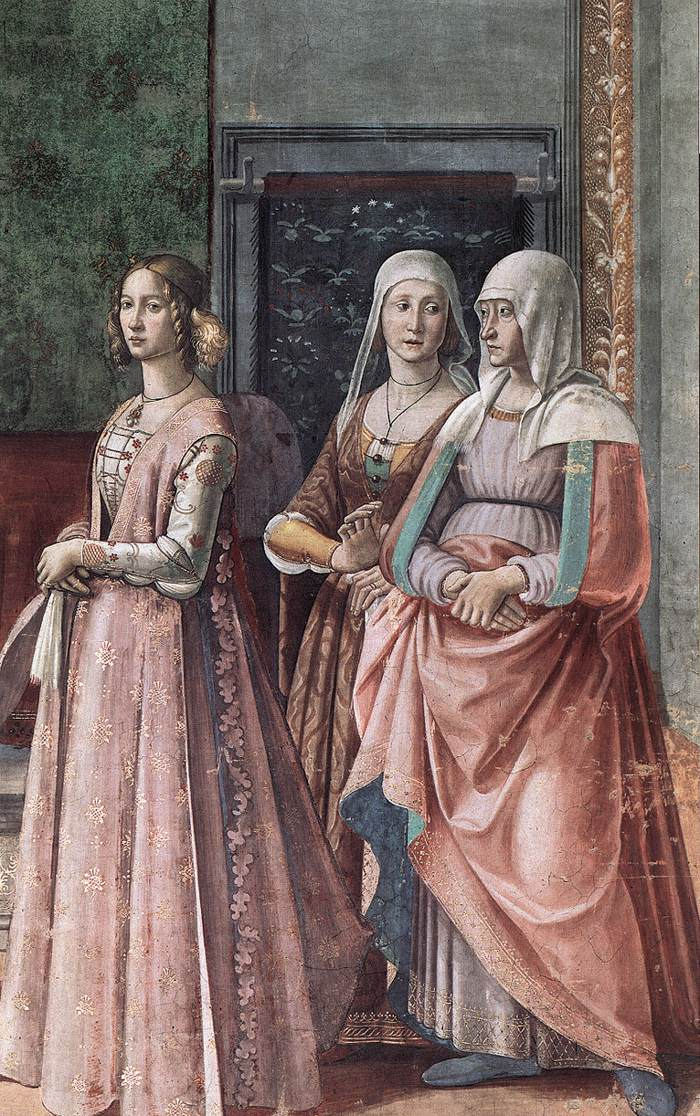
The Birth of St. John the Baptist, c. 1485–1490, by Domenico Ghirlandaio. The woman to the left wears a gamurra underneath a giornea and the women in the center seems to wear a gamurra under an overdress.

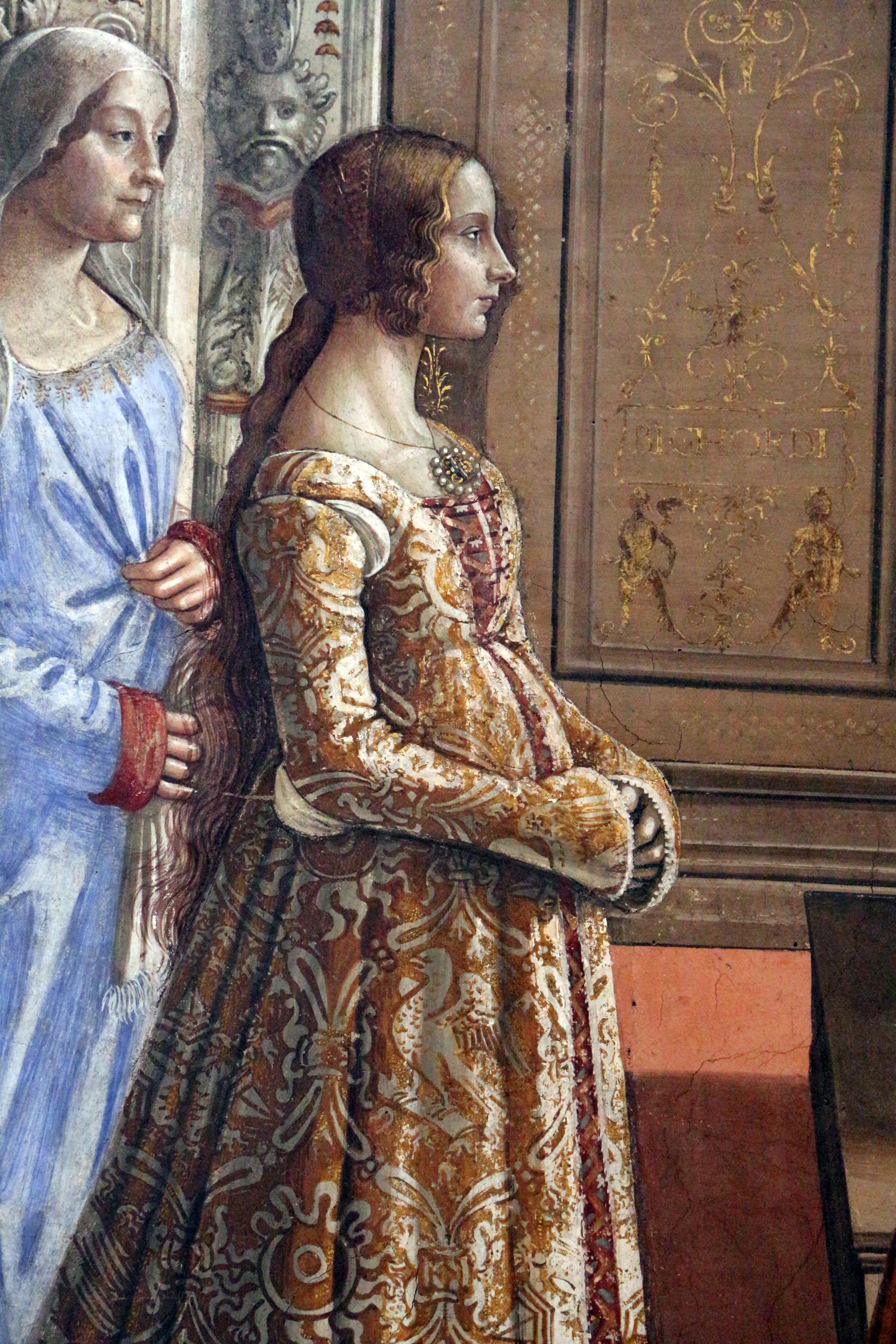
Birth of Mary (detail), c. 1485–1490, by Domenico Ghirlandaio. A full-length image of Sancha of Aragon wearing a gamurra.
