= Giovanni Paolo I Sforza =

Italian noble (1497–1535)

Giovanni Paolo I Sforza (March 1497 – December 1535) was an Italian condottiero, the first in the Sforza family line of the Marquesses of Caravaggio.

Coat of arms of Giovanni Paolo I Sforza, adapted from a rarely used coat of arms received by his father from Emperor Maximilian I

He was a legitimized son of Ludovico il Moro, duke of Milan, and Lucrezia Crivelli. In 1513, when his half-brother Massimiliano shortly restored the family seignory in Milan, he took part in the defence of Novara against the French. When his other half-brother Francesco II made a similar attempt (1525), Giovanni Paolo was besieged in the Castello Sforzesco by the Spaniards under Antonio de Leyva; three years later he was again besieged by them in Lodi, this time with victorious results.

In 1532, after the peace of Bologna between Francesco II and Charles V, Holy Roman Emperor, he received in reward the title of marquess of Caravaggio. Three years later, after Francesco's death, he moved to the Kingdom of Naples (then under Spanish suzerainty) to reclaim the Duchy of Milan for himself, but died midway at Florence under mysterious circumstances. Some sources says that he was poisoned by de Leyva.

He was married to Violante Bentivoglio (1505–1550) whose maternal great-grandfather was Galeazzo Maria Sforza (died 1476) Duke of Milan. Giovanni's son Muzio I Sforza succeeded him in Caravaggio and in the county of Galliate.

== See also ==
- House of Sforza
- Italian War of 1521-1526
- War of the League of Cognac
