= Lucrezia Crivelli =

Lady-in-waiting; mistress of Ludovico Sforza

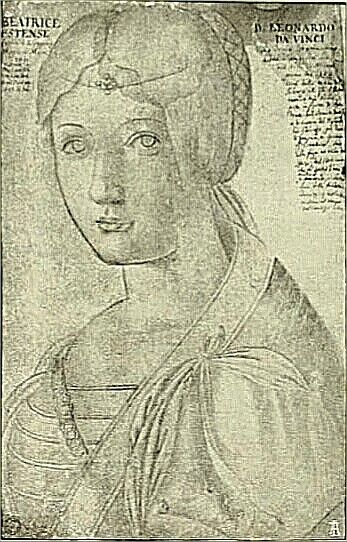
Sketch of Beatrice d'Este by Leonardo Da Vinci 1495

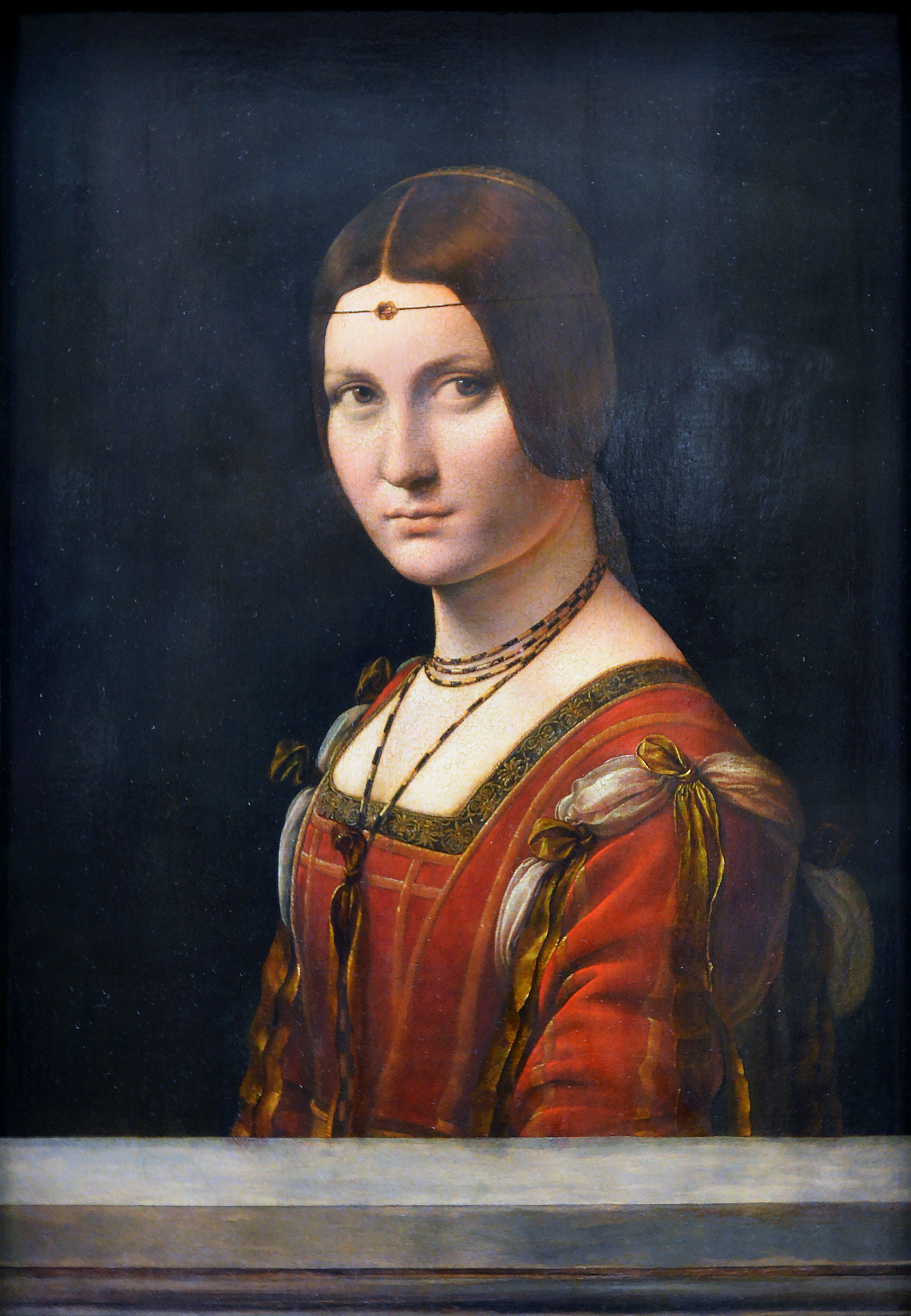
La belle ferronnière by Leonardo da Vinci is believed either Lucrezia Crivelli or Beatrice d'Este

Lucrezia Crivelli (1464-1534), was an Italian noblewoman and lady-in-waiting. She was a mistress of Ludovico Sforza "il Moro", Duke of Milan. She was the mother of Sforza's son, Giovanni Paolo I Sforza, Marquess of Caravaggio. Crivelli has been thought to be the subject of Leonardo da Vinci's painting, La belle ferronnière.

== Personal life ==
Crivelli was a lady-in-waiting to Ludovico Sforza's wife, Beatrice d'Este (29 June 1475 – 2 January 1497). During this time, she also became the mistress of Sforza. In 1497, she gave birth to his son, Giovanni Paolo. Sforza's affair with Crivelli caused much distress to his wife, who was considered accomplished and cultured. Upon learning of the affair, d'Este tried without success to have Crivelli banished from court. However, after Beatrice's death in 1497, Lucrezia returned to court and bore Sforza a second child in 1500.

She also had a legitimate daughter by her husband Giovanni da Monastirolo: Bona da Monastirolo, who married Giovanni Pietro Bergamini (son of Cecilia Gallerani, also a former mistress of Sforza, and her husband Ludovico Carminati of Brembilla) and died after 1520.

Crivelli's son by Sforza, Giovanni Paolo I Sforza (March 1497 – December 1535), became the first Marquess of Caravaggio, as well as a celebrated condottiero. He married Violante Bentivoglio (1505–1550), a granddaughter of Galeazzo Maria Sforza, by his mistress Lucrezia Landriani. The marriage produced a son and a daughter. The fate of their second child is not known. Ludovico Sforza died in 1508.

Crivelli lived for many years, until April 12, 1534, in Rocca di Canneto in Mantua, under the protection of Isabella d'Este, the elder sister of Beatrice.

== La belle ferronnière ==
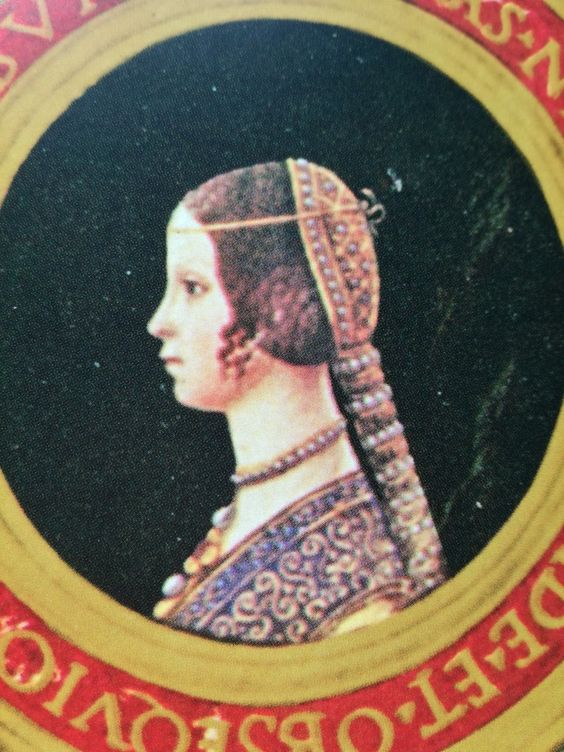
Miniature of Beatrice d'Este at 18, contained in the donation certificate dated 28 January 1494 with which her husband assigned her numerous lands, now preserved in the British Library in London.

While unproven, Crivelli has long been presumed to be the subject of Leonardo da Vinci's painting La belle ferronnière, which is displayed in the Louvre. The rationale for the Crivelli identification has been primarily based on da Vinci's earlier depiction of Cecilia Gallerani, in his painting, Lady with an Ermine. Gallerani had been an earlier mistress of Sforza. In a 2011 exhibition at the National Gallery, London entitled, Leonardo Da Vinci: Painter at the Court of Milan (9 November 2011 – 5 February 2012), the gallery listed the painting as a possible portrait of Beatrice d'Este, wife of Ludovico Sforza, rather than his mistress, Crivelli.

== "Profile of a young lady: Lucrezia Crivelli" ==
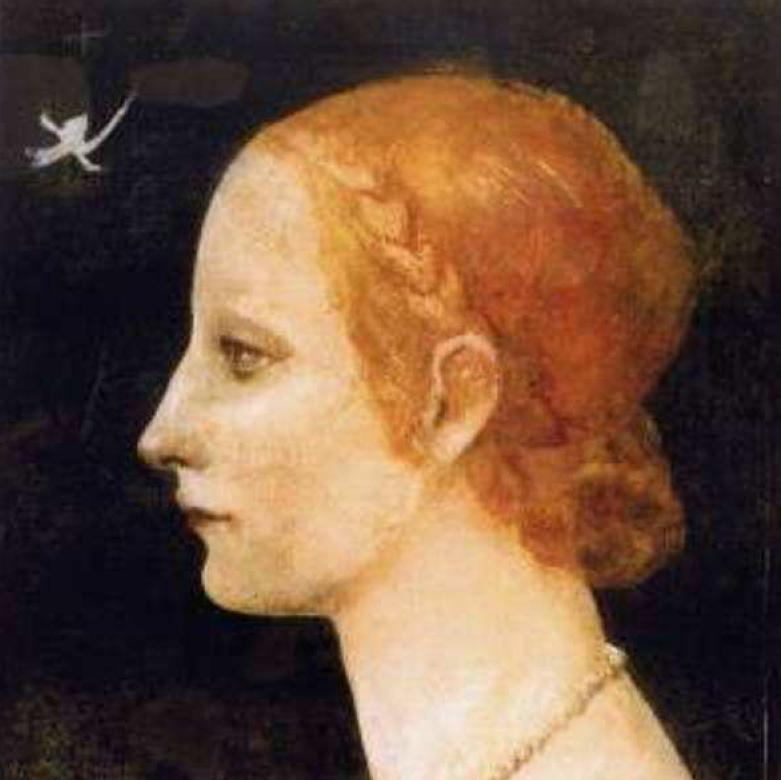
Profile of a Young Lady (Lucrezia Crivelli)

It has been initially suspected by Adolfo Venturi (1933) and then recently found that the Lucrezia Crivelli is not the Belle Ferronnière at all. In recent years, the original painting of Lucrezia Crivelli, that has been kept in the family for centuries, has been shown to the public, during an important exhibition in Speyer (Historisches Museum from June 19 to November 19, 1995) . But regardless of the enormous success of the painting amongst the general public, the striking elements of the real Crivelli painting are to be found in the examination made by Pinin Barcillon Brambilla ( the restorer of the Last Supper ) who found that some pigments are the same of the Milanese mural .
