= Bernardino Corio =

Italian humanist and historian of the Renaissance

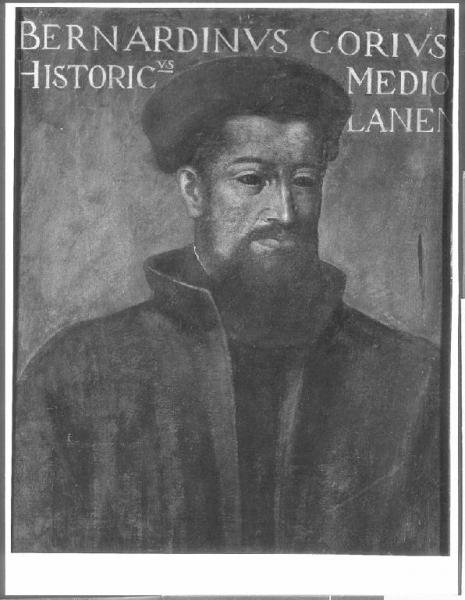
- Bernardino Corio
- Born: 8 March 1459; Milan, Duchy of Milan
- Died: 1519 (aged 59–60); Milan, Duchy of Milan
- Occupations: Historian; Renaissance humanist
- Spouse: Agnese Fagnani
- Children: 5
- Parent(s): Marco Corio and Elisabetta Borri

Academic work
- Era: Renaissance
- Notable works: Historia di Milano (1503)
- Influenced: Niccolò Machiavelli; Giuseppe Ripamonti

Bernardino Corio (born 1459 in Milan; died c. 1519) was an Italian humanist and historian of the Renaissance. His Patria historia (1503), which traces the history of Milan from its remote origins to 1499, is the earliest scholarly study of Italian history to be written in Italian vernacular rather than Latin.

== Biography ==
Bernardino Corio came from a renowned Milanese family that had served the Sforza for over 250 years.

He began his career as chamberlain of Galeazzo Maria in 1474, and was a witness to the latter's murder on 26 December 1476. He subsequently held various offices at the Sforza Court before entering into the circle of Duke Ludovico Sforza, an endorsement that led him to assume first the office of regional podestà in the 1490s, then the appointment as Giudice delle Strade (in charge of road maintenance). The latter office constituted Ludovico il Moro's sign of gratitude for the Historia Patria, the first chronicle of the city of Milan written in the Italian. Corio's Historia traces the history of Milan from its origins until 1499, when Ludovico il Moro was forced out by the French.

Corio began his history around 1485, initially with the support of Ludovico Sforza, who actively desired the Sforza claim to Milan to be justified and its deeds embellished. The Duke strove to facilitate Corio's work. In 1497 he ordered the civil and religious authorities in Valtellina and in Como to permit the writer access to their archives and libraries. Part of the documents were moved to a comfortable lodging house, while those volumes in need of more in-depth consultation were carried to Milan. Ludovico also placed an assistant, Francesco Bianchi, at Corio's disposal and supported the challenge with the amount of 50 lire.

By the time the history was completed, however, the Sforza had been overthrown and Ludovico had been captured by the French. Following Ludovico's downfall, Corio left Milan. In 1503 the Historia was finally concluded and printed under the supervision of the author. Nothing is known about his fate thereafter.

At odds with the conventions of the erudite tradition, Corio's History is written in a vivid Italian style, instead of scholarly Latin. According to John Addington Symonds:

Corio's voluminous narrative is a mine of accurate information, illustrated with vivid pictures of manners and carefully considered portraits of eminent men. Reading it, we cannot but regret that Poggio and Bruno, Navagero and Bembo, judged it necessary to tell the tales of Florence and of Venice in a pseudo-Livian Latin. The "History of Milan" is worth twenty of such humanistic exercises in rhetoric.

— John Addington Symonds (1881). Renaissance in Italy: Italian literature. Vol. 1. London: Smith, Elder & Co. p. 177.

== Works ==
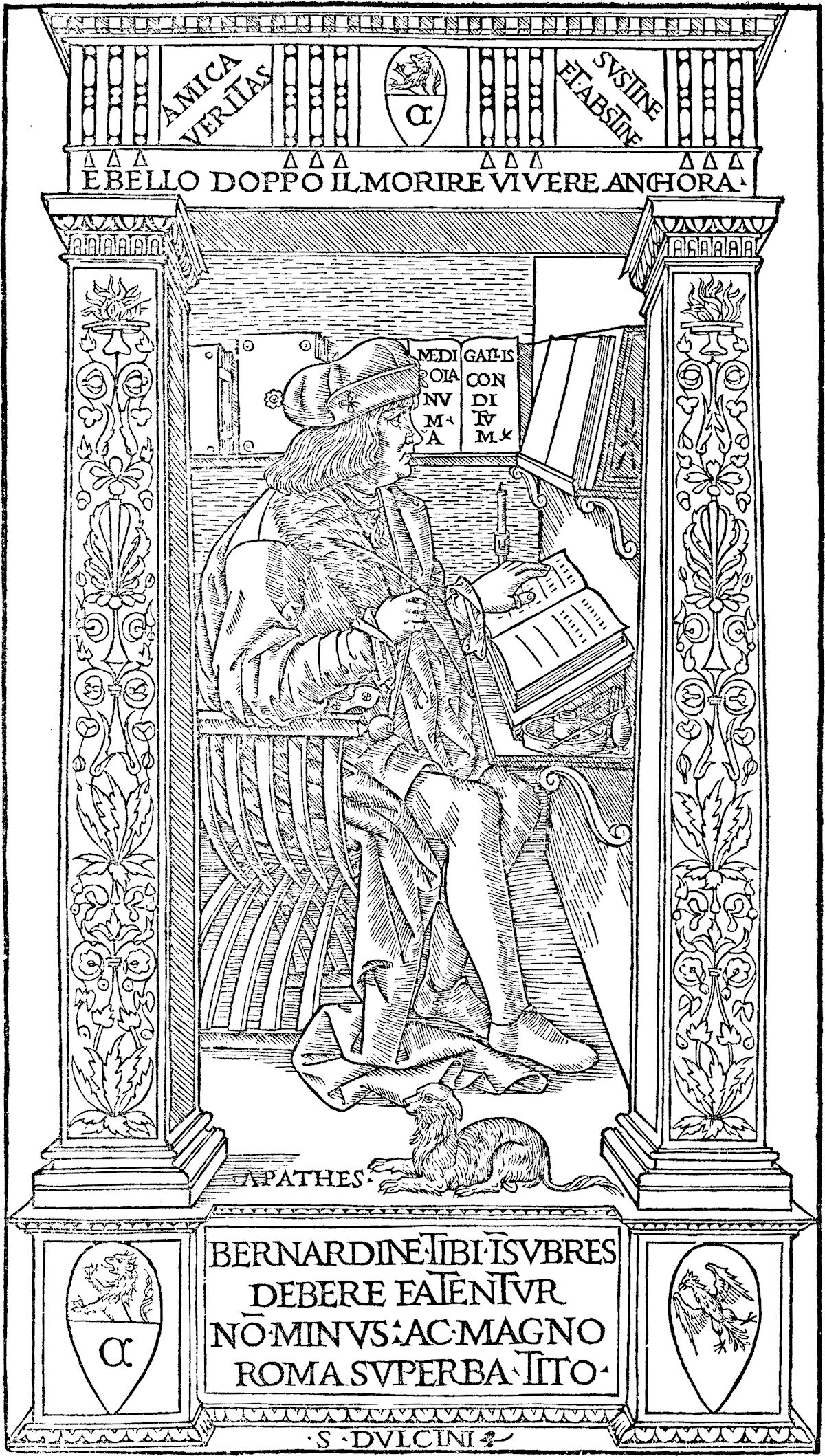
Patria Historia, 1503

- Utile dialogo amoroso. Milan: Alessandro Minuziano. 1502.
- Historia continente da l'origine di Milano tutti li gesti, fatti, e detti preclari. Milan: Alessandro Minuziano. 1503.

=== Modern editions ===
- Egidio De Magri, ed. (1855). Storia di Milano. Milan: Colombo.
- Anna Morisi Guerra, ed. (1978). Storia di Milano. Turin: UTET. ISBN 88-02-02537-1.

== Literature ==
- Picinelli, Filippo (1670). Ateneo dei letterati milanesi. Milan: Vigone. p. 88.
- Campbell, G. (2003). "Corio, Bernadino". The Oxford Dictionary of the Renaissance. Oxford University Press.
- Stefano Meschini: Uno storico umanista alla corte sforzesca. Biografia di Bernardino Corio (= Biblioteca di storia moderna e contemporanea 8 = Pubblicazioni della Università Cattolica del Sacro Cuore. Scienze storiche 58). Vita e Pensiero, Milano 1995, ISBN 88-343-1240-6.
- Petrucci, Franca (1983). "Corio, Bernardino". Dizionario Biografico degli Italiani (in Italian). Vol. 29: Cordier–Corvo. Rome: Istituto dell'Enciclopedia Italiana. ISBN 978-88-12-00032-6.
- Cadili, Alberto (2013). "Corio, Bernardino". Il Contributo italiano alla storia del Pensiero - Storia e Politica. Istituto dell'Enciclopedia Italiana.
- Cabrini, Anna Maria (2014). "Corio, Bernardino". Enciclopedia machiavelliana. Istituto dell'Enciclopedia Italiana.
