= Gobbo =

Gobbo is an Italian surname meaning "hunchback".

== People with the surname ==
- Antonio Roque Gobbo (born 1935), Brazilian writer
- Gian Paolo Gobbo (born 1949), Italian politician
- Sir James Gobbo (1931-2021), Australian jurist, 25th Governor of Victoria
- Nicola Gobbo (born 1972), Australian lawyer
- Renzo Gobbo (born 1961), Italian footballer and manager
- Tessa Gobbo (born 1990), American rower

== People with the nickname ==
- Cristoforo Solari, also known as il Gobbo

== Fictional characters with the name ==
- Launcelot Gobbo, a clown in Shakespeare's play The Merchant of Venice
- Old Gobbo, father of Launcelot Gobbo, also in The Merchant of Venice
- Gobbo, a goblin character in the Noddy books by Enid Blyton
- Gobbos, furry creatures found in the video game Croc: Legend of the Gobbos and its sequel

== See also ==
- Gobo (disambiguation)
- Goblin (disambiguation)
