= Gibiteca Antonio Gobbo =

Comic books collection in Brazil

Coordinates: 19.942°S 43.942°W

The Gibiteca Antonio Gobbo is a major public collection of comics books in Brazil. It is one of the biggest of this kind in Brazil and Latin America. It is in the city of Belo Horizonte, in Minas Gerais state, Brazil. The Gibiteca is located at the "Biblioteca Pública Infantil e Juvenil de Belo Horizonte," that belongs to the "Fundação Municipal de Cultura de Belo Horizonte" (Municipal Foundation of Culture of Belo Horizonte).

== History ==
The Gibiteca Antonio Gobbo was founded in 1992 from the donation of the "Biblioteca Nacional de Histórias em Quadrinhos - BNHQ" (National Comics Library), private collection of Antonio Roque Gobbo.

== Collection ==
The collection 2010 consists of more than 18,000 copies of many genres and theoretical material, with specimens from countries, such as France, USA, Portugal, Italy and Spain.

In the collection one can find comic books, journals, albums, comics, fanzines, etc.

== Activities on Gibiteca ==
The Gibiteca is a centre for expositions, lectures, activities, etc.

== Localization ==
The Gibiteca is in the "Biblioteca Pública Infantil e Juvenil de Belo Horizonte" a public library. The address is Rua Guaicurus, 50, Centro, Belo Horizonte, Minas Gerais, Brazil.
