= Gobo =

Gobo may refer to:

== Places ==
- Gobō, Wakayama, a city located in Wakayama Prefecture, Japan
  - Gobō Station, a railway station in the city
- Gobo, Cameroon, a commune in Cameroon

== Plants ==
- Gobō (Arctium lappa), a biennial plant
- Gobo (burdock), the root of the burdock (Arctium), a popular food in Asia

== Other definitions ==
- Gobo (lighting), a template or pattern that controls the shape of the light from a projector or spotlight.
- Gobo (recording), a movable acoustic isolation panel
- Gobo Fraggle, a character in the television series Fraggle Rock
- GoboLinux, a Linux distribution
- Gobo, a character in Bambi, a Life in the Woods

== See also ==
- Gobbo
