= Beatrice d'Este =

Duchess of Bari and Duchess of Milan

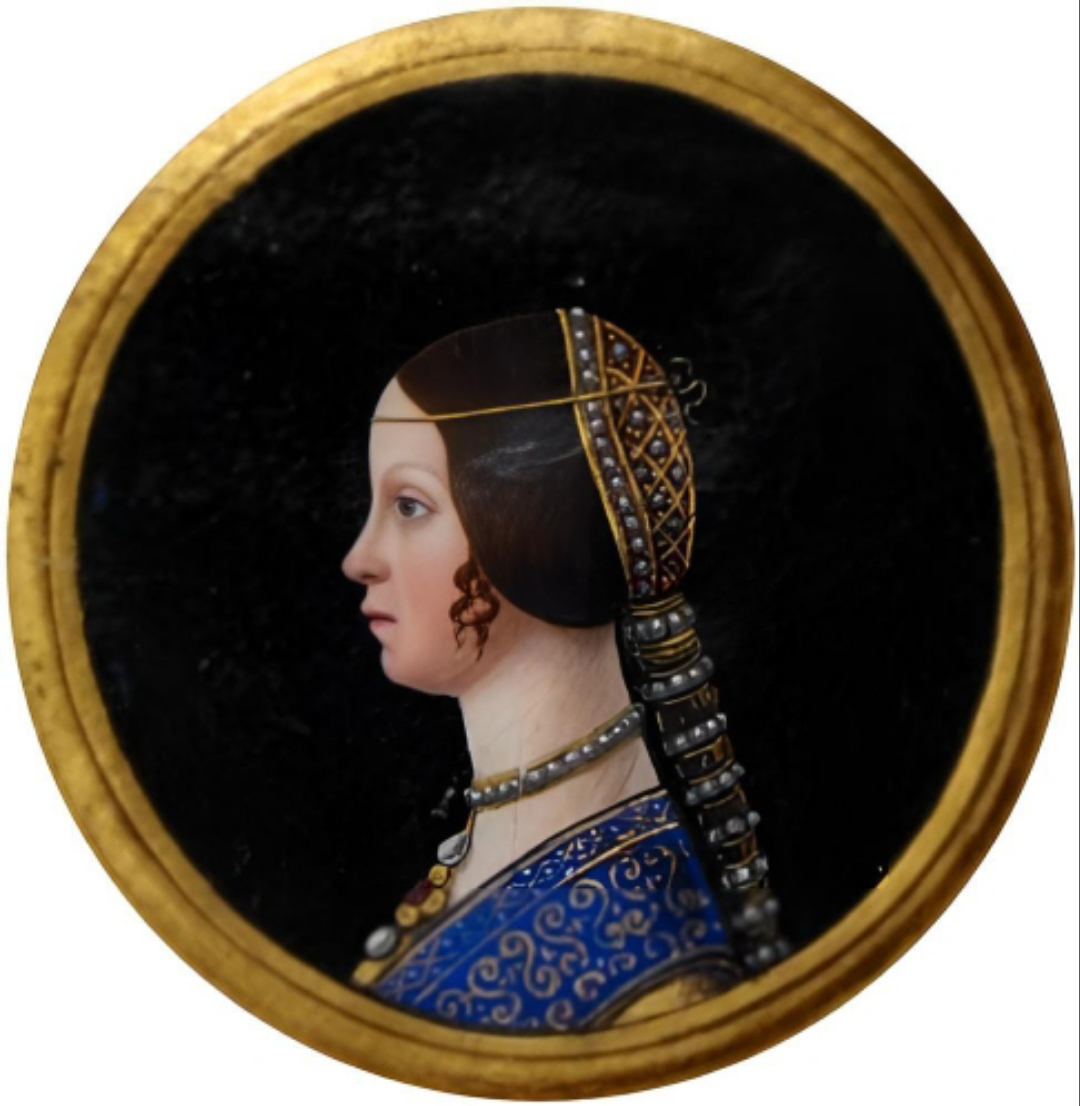
- Miniature of Beatrice at the age of 18, by Giovanni Pietro Birago.
- Born: 29 June 1475; Ferrara, Duchy of Ferrara
- Died: 3 January 1497 (aged 21); Milan, Duchy of Milan
- Noble family: Este
- Spouse: Ludovico Sforza (m. 1491)
- Issue: Massimiliano Sforza; Francesco II Sforza
- Father: Ercole I d'Este
- Mother: Leonora of Naples
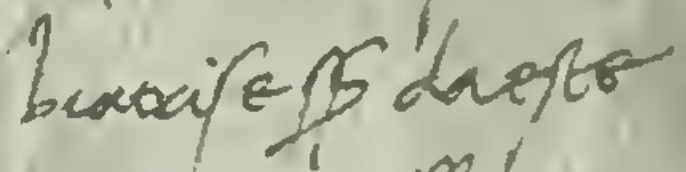
- Signature

Beatrice d'Este (29 June 1475 - 3 January 1497) was a noblewoman from Ferrara, duchess of Bari and Milan by her marriage to Ludovico Sforza (known as "Ludovico il Moro"). She was known as a woman of culture, an important patron of arts and science and a leader in fashion: alongside her husband, she made Milan one of the greatest capitals of the European Renaissance. With her determination and bellicose nature, she led the Milanese resistance against the French during the first of the Italian Wars. Her interventions repelled the Duke of Orléans who was on the verge of conquering Milan.

== Life ==
=== Childhood ===
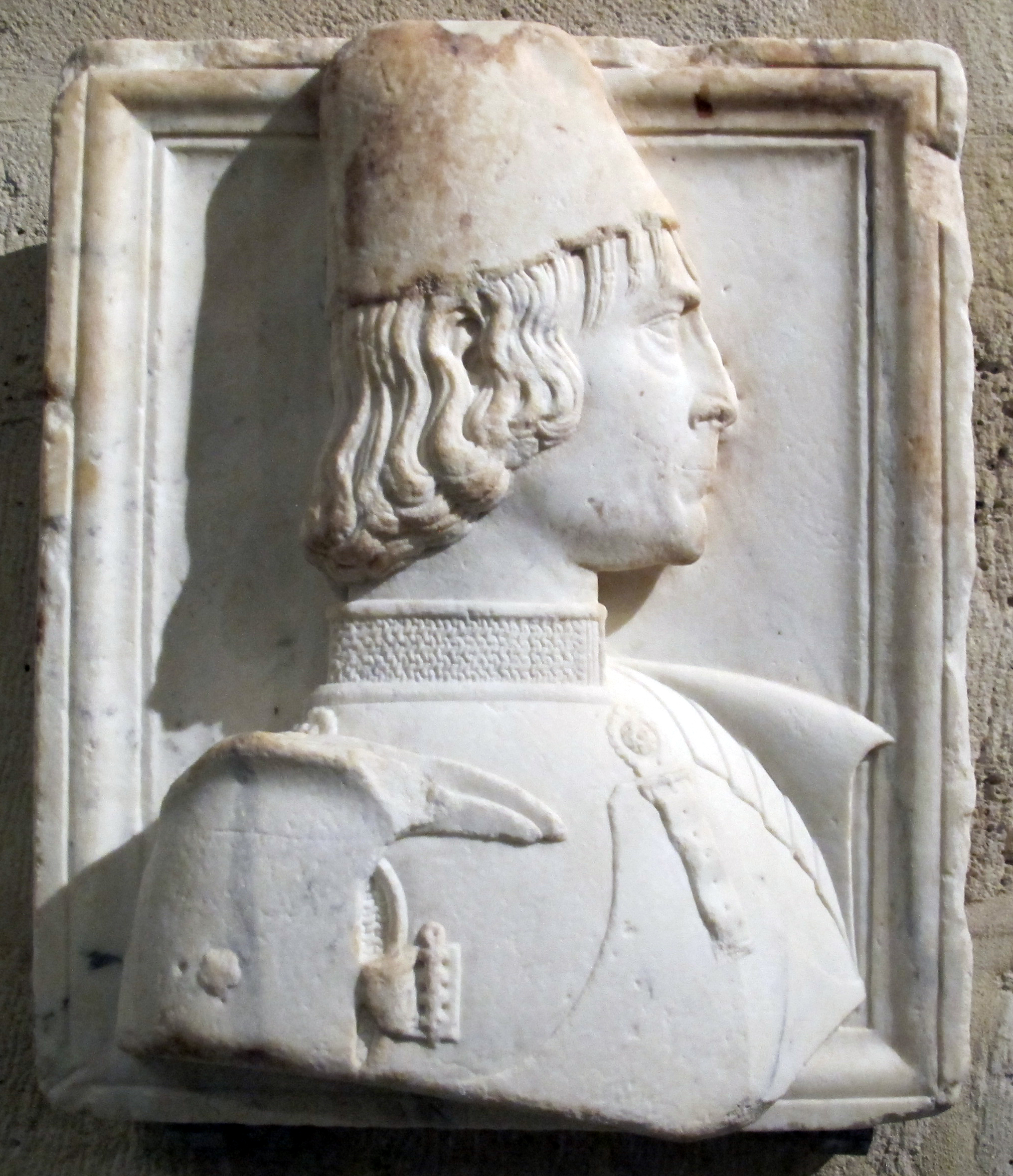
Ercole d'Este, Beatrice's father, in a sculpture by Sperandio Savelli.

==== Birth and childhood in Naples (1477–1485) ====
She was born on 29 June 1475 in the Castello Estense in Ferrara as the second child of Ercole I d'Este and Eleanor of Aragon. As his father did not yet have a male heir, Beatrice's birth was a disappointment to her family and the court.

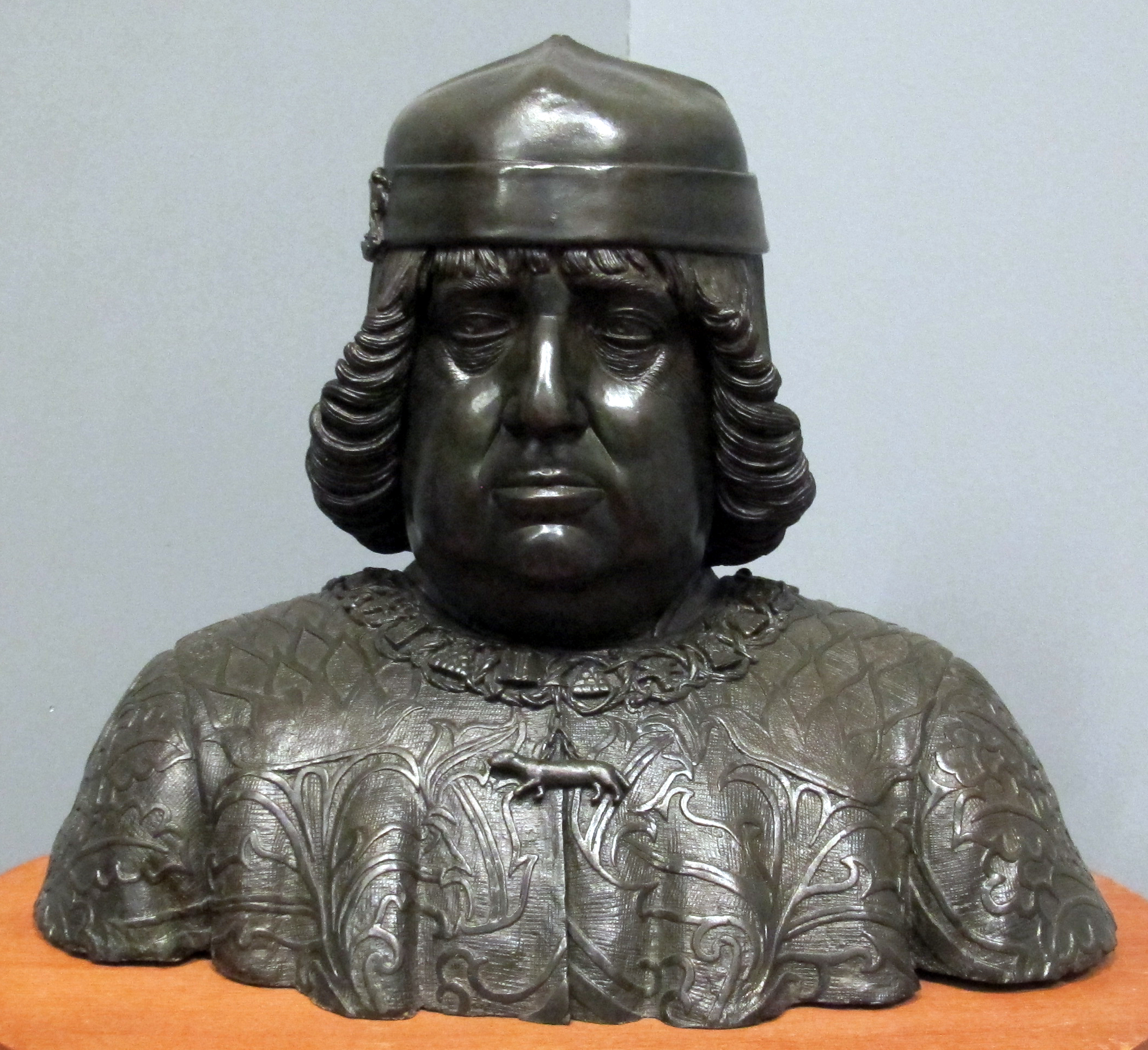
Bust of Ferrante of Aragon king of Naples, grandfather of Beatrice

At the age of two, her mother took Beatrice and her elder sister Isabella to the Neapolitan court to attend the wedding of Eleanor's father, Ferdinand I, King of Naples and his second wife, Joanna of Aragon. They first travelled to Pisa, from where they sailed in a galley, arriving in Naples on 1 June 1477. On 19 September, Eleonora gave birth to her third child, Ferrante. When, less than a month later, she had to return to Ferrara, she decided to take only Isabella back. King Ferdinand convinced her to leave both Beatrice and Ferrante in Naples; he had shown great love for his granddaughter from the time of their first meeting.

Beatrice lived in Naples for eight years in the care of a nurse called Serena and her cultured and virtuous aunt, Ippolita Maria Sforza. She lived alternately in the residence of her aunt and uncle, Castel Capuano, with her younger brother and three cousins, Ferrandino, Pietro, and Isabella, and the royal residence of Castel Nuovo with her grandparents. Ferrante considered her the "same" his daughter, the Infanta Giovannella. In 1479, the Este ambassador wrote to Beatrice's mother that the King was willing to return her son but not Beatrice, because he "wants to give her in marriage and keep her for himself". Formally adopted by her grandfather, she signed her name as "donna Beatrice de Aragonia" and spoke a mixture of Catalan, Castilian, and Italian, a habit that she seems not to have preserved as an adult.

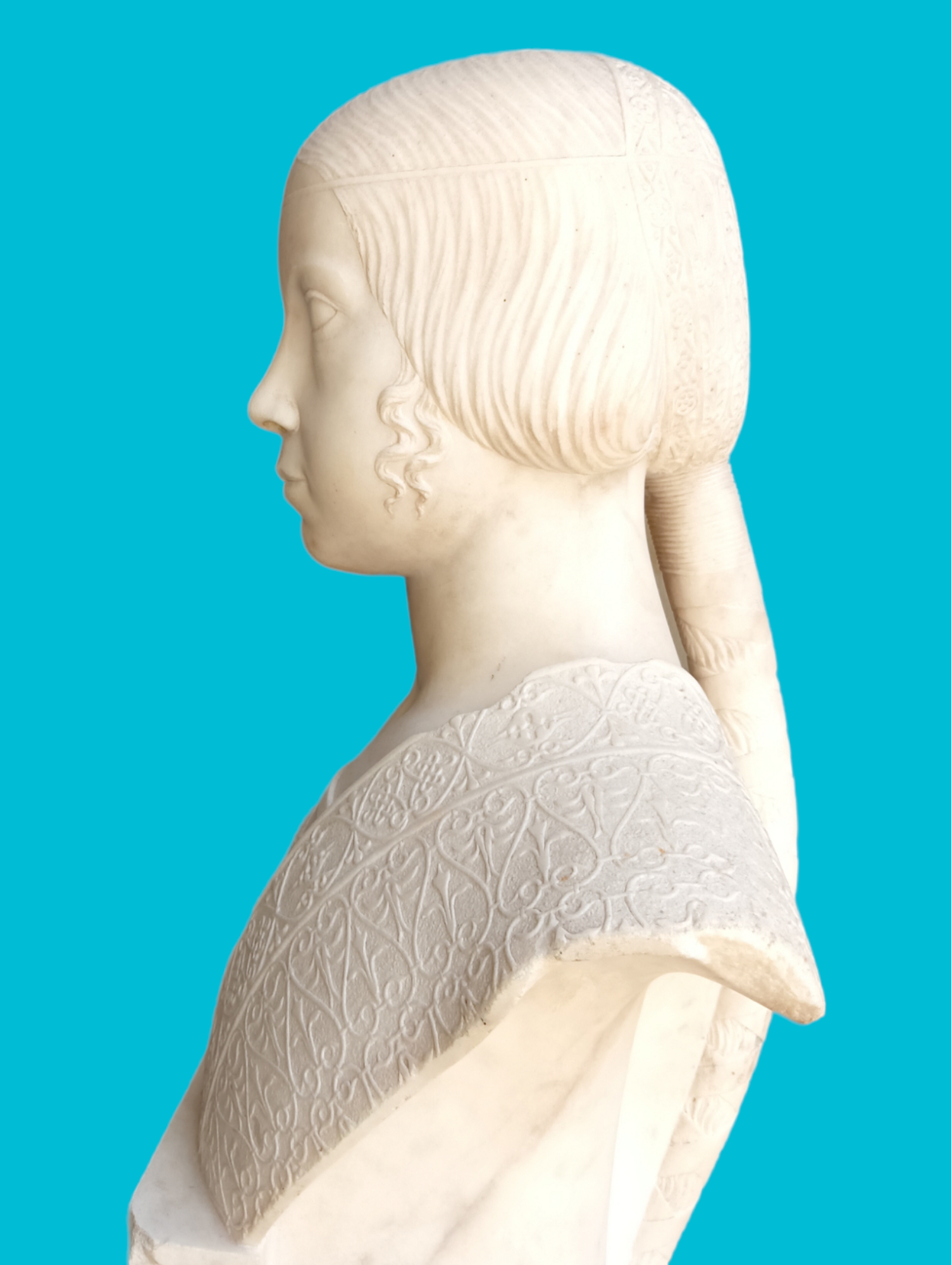
Bust of Beatrice d'Este, Gian Cristoforo Romano, 1485–90

==== Marriage proposals ====
In 1480 Ludovico "il Moro" Sforza, Duke of Bari, regent of Milan, began negotiations with Ercole d'Este for the hand of his eldest daughter Isabella, but she had already been betrothed to Francesco Gonzaga. Ercole did not want to give up on a relationship with one of the richest and most influential men in Italy and proposed Beatrice instead. With the consent of King Ferdinand, the idea was immediately accepted. The alliance proved very useful to the Duchy of Ferrara, constantly threatened by Venetian expansionism.

In 1484, her maternal aunt, Beatrice of Aragon, Queen of Hungary, proposed an exchange in which Isabella d'Este would marry King Vladislaus II of Bohemia and Hungary (Beatrice of Aragon's alleged loved), Beatrice d'Este would marry Francesco Gonzaga, and Ludovico Sforza would marry another Neapolitan noblewoman. Eleanor replied that this was impossible, both because Isabella was loved by Gonzaga and because Beatrice was in her grandfather's power. She offered to secretly negotiate with their father to secretly betrothe Beatrice to Vladislaus, guaranteeing her a husband in case Ludovico sought a wife "more in keeping with his age". In 1485, Marquis Boniface III, Marquis of Monferrat, a childless widower over sixty hinted at marrying Beatrice; the proposal was probably not followed, both because of the age difference of 51 and because Montferrat needed a wife of childbearing age.

==== Adolescence in Ferrara (1485–1490) ====
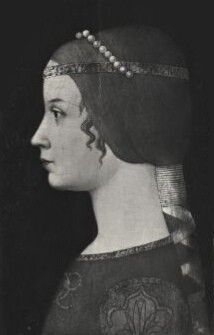
Beatrice at the age of ten by Cosmè Tura, 1485

In 1485, Ludovico persuaded Beatrice's parents to take her back to Ferrara, so that her education could be better suited to her future role (the Milanese had a very low opinion of Neapolitans). Ercole and Eleanor told the King of Naples that they want to be able to visit their daughter more easily (which they never did). King Ferdinand refused, saying that he considered Beatrice his daughter, and that, at only ten, she was not ready for the wedding. Moreover, if Ludovico died early, Ferdinand claimed that Beatrice's father would not be able to find her another good husband. He even offered to provide her dowry to convince the parents to leave Beatrice in Naples. Despite his strong resistance, he had to reluctantly agree to let her go. Immediately after the departure of his granddaughter, he wrote to his daughter Eleonora: "God knows how much we grieved, for the singular love we had for her virtues [...] that seeing her and having her at home it seemed to us that we had you".

Given the prestige of the bridegroom, the parents tried to move the wedding forward to 1488, but Ludovico explained to Ercole that he was too busy with affairs of the state and that the bride was still too young. The date was set for May 1490 and a dowry of 40,000 ducats was arranged. However, Ludovico then postponed the wedding to the summer, then cancelled again. The ducal couple of Ferrara now doubted his commitment to marry Beatrice. Ludovcio's reluctance was attributed to his well-known relationship with Cecilia Gallerani. To apologize for the postponements, in August 1490 he gifted his bride a splendid necklace.

=== First years in Milan (1491–1497) ===
A double wedding between Beatrice and Ludovico and her sister Isabella and Franscesco Gonzaga was planned for January 1491, but Ludovico postponed again. Finally, around a year later, a double Sforza-Este wedding was held: Ludovico wed Beatrice and her brother, Alfonso married Anna Sforza, Ludovico's niece. Leonardo da Vinci organised the wedding celebrations. In Milan, Beatrice met two people who would become important in her life: Bianca Giovanna Sforza, her husband's nine-year-old illegitimate daughter, and her husband, Galeazzo Sanseverino. Beatrice immediately loved Bianca and wanted her company on every occasion.

Officially, the marriage was immediately declared consummated. However, Ludovico, out of respect for Beatrice's "innocence", waited for over a month for her willingness, not wanting to force her. Beatrice's parents urged the couple to consummate their marriage, which could otherwise be annulled. Ludovico tried to seduce his wife with caresses, kisses, and rich daily gifts. Nevertheless, Beatrice remained "in superlative ashamed" even in mid-February. Ludovico complained to the Este ambassador, Giacomo Trotti, that he had to "vent" with his mistress Cecilia. The ambassador reproached Beatrice and told her to put "so much shame on the other side", by saying that "men want to be well seen and caressed, as is just and honest, by their wives". This did not have any success; nor did the continuous pressure exerted by the father. The more forcefully others insisted, the more Beatrice resisted her husband's advances. The situation was finally resolved spontaneously in March or April. According to Trotti, now Ludovico declared that he no longer thought of Cecilia but only of Beatrice, "to whom he wants all his good, and takes great pleasure from her for her customs and good manners", praising her because "she was delighted by nature ... and very pleasant and nevertheless modest".

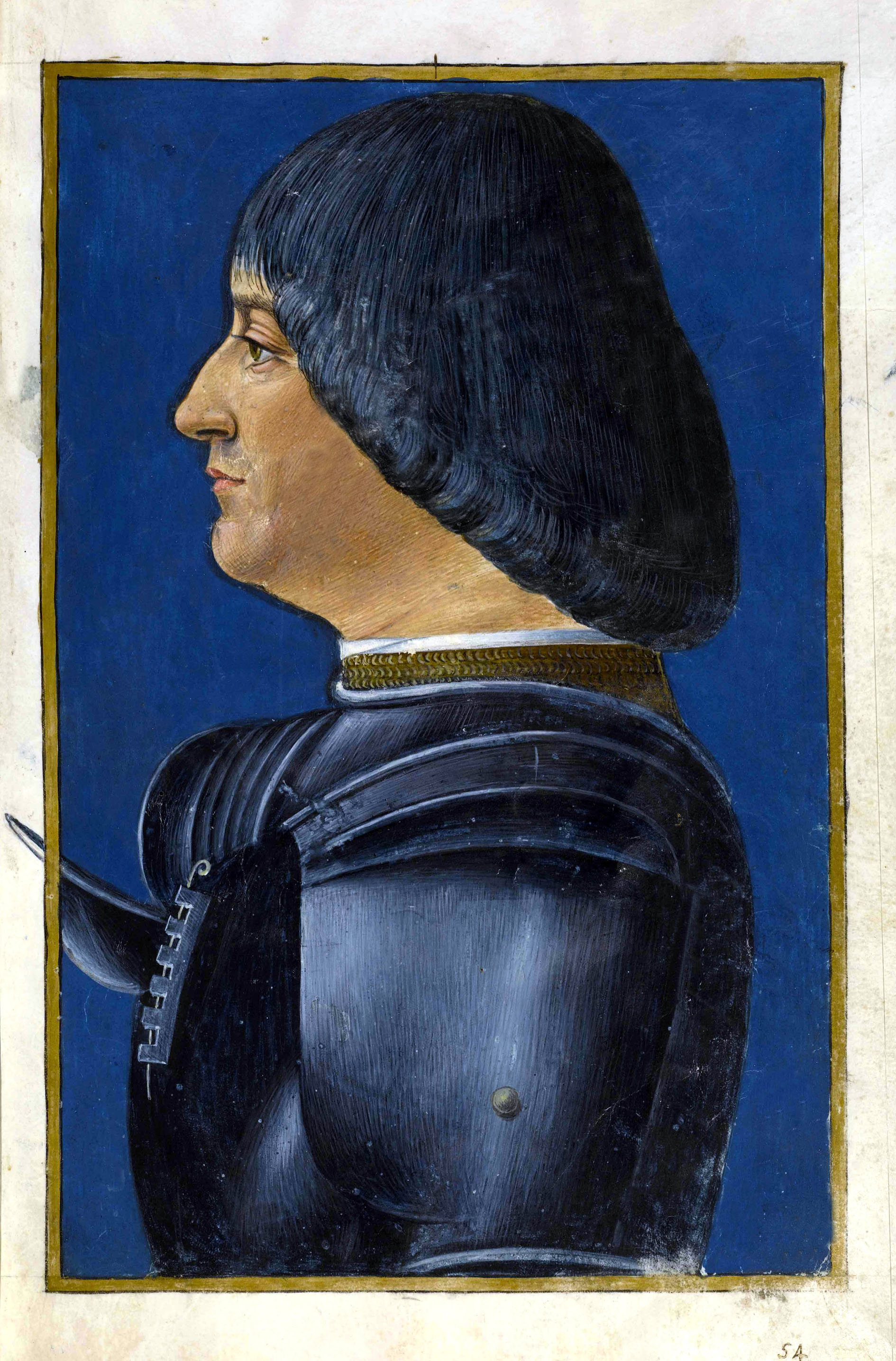
Portrait of Ludovico il Moro, 1496.

==== Birth of first son ====
After a carefree first year spent of entertainments, Beatrice became pregnant. On 20 January 1493, Eleanor of Aragon arrived in Milan to assist Beatrice during childbirth, bringing Comare Frasina, the midwife of the Este family. Two days later, the celebratory gifts of the Milanese nobility were exhibited in the Sala del Tesoro in the Rocchetta building of the Sforza Castle on tables covered with crimson gold velvet. Among these were "two beautiful diamonds" worth 18,000 ducats and a golden cradle from Beatrice's father. On 23 January, Beatrice gave birth to her first-born son, christened Ercole after his maternal grandfather but later called Maximilian in honour of the Maximilian I, Holy Roman Emperor.

From then on, Beatrice's primary concern became ensuring her son's succession to the Duchy of Milan, which legitimately belonged to the son of her cousin Isabella. She persuaded her husband to appoint Maximilian count of Pavia, title of the heir to the duchy. Isabella, understanding the intentions of the spouses, wrote to her father Alfonso a heartfelt request for help. King Ferrante, however, had no intention of starting a war; on the contrary, he declared that he loved both granddaughters in the same way and invited them to prudence so that the situation remained stable while the king was alive.

==== Diplomatic mission to Venice ====
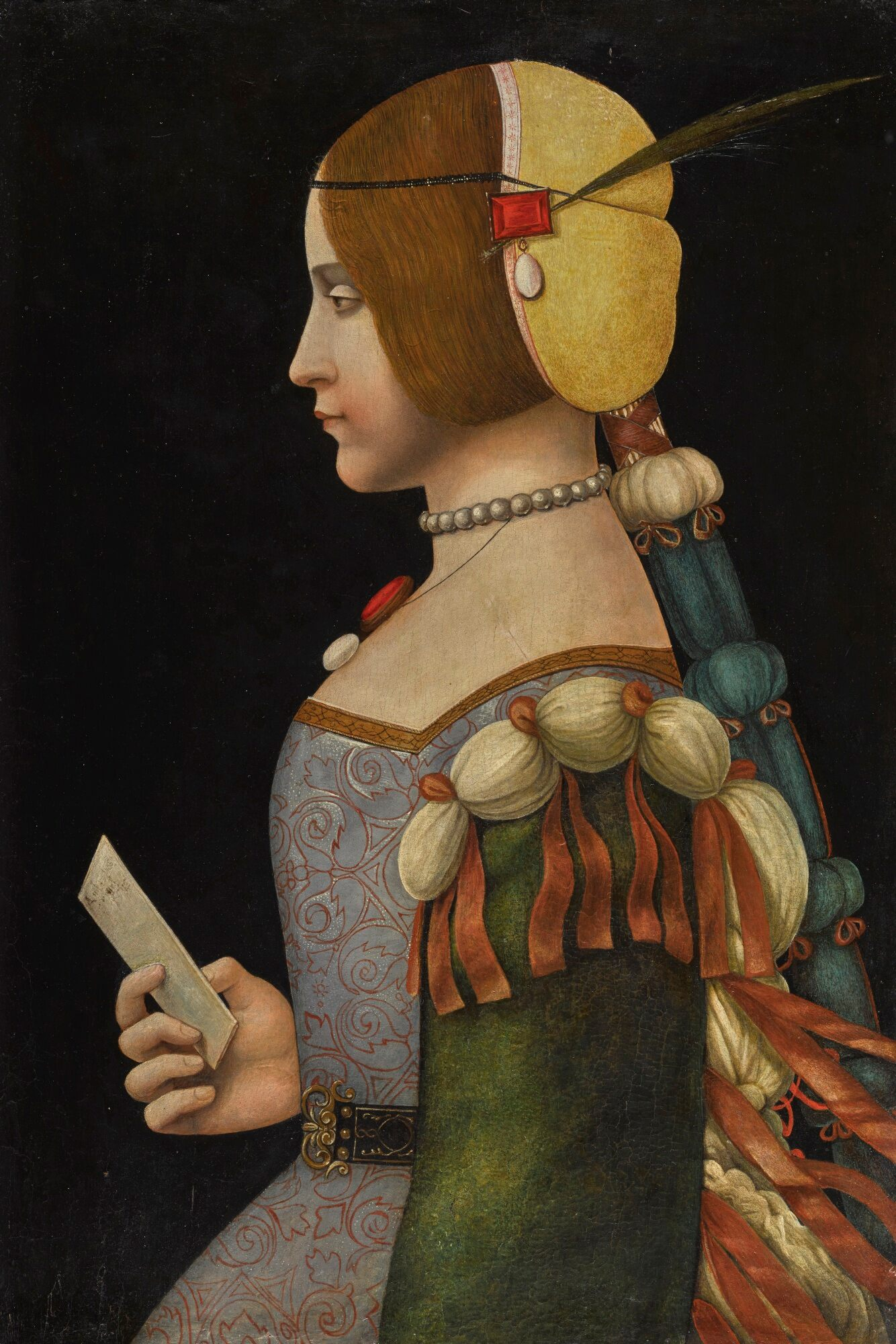
The Rothschild Lady attributed to Bernardino de' Conti. Identified as a portrait of Beatrice. Late fifteenth century.

In May 1493, Ludovico sent his wife as his ambassador to Venice to obtain support for his legitimacy as duke of Milan. Beatrice was to use her charm and intelligence and the pomp of her court to impress the Venetians. The couple first passed through Ferrara, where they were greeted festively by Beatrice's parents. Isabella d'Este, who did not to be compared unfavourably to her sister, went to Venice before their arrival. On 25 May, Beatrice left for Venice with her mother Eleanor, her brother Alfonso with his wife Anna, various secretaries and advisers, and a retinue of more than 1 200 people. They sailed first along the Po, then on a dangerously rough sea. Many of the company were afraid, but not Beatrice, who enjoyed mocking the others.

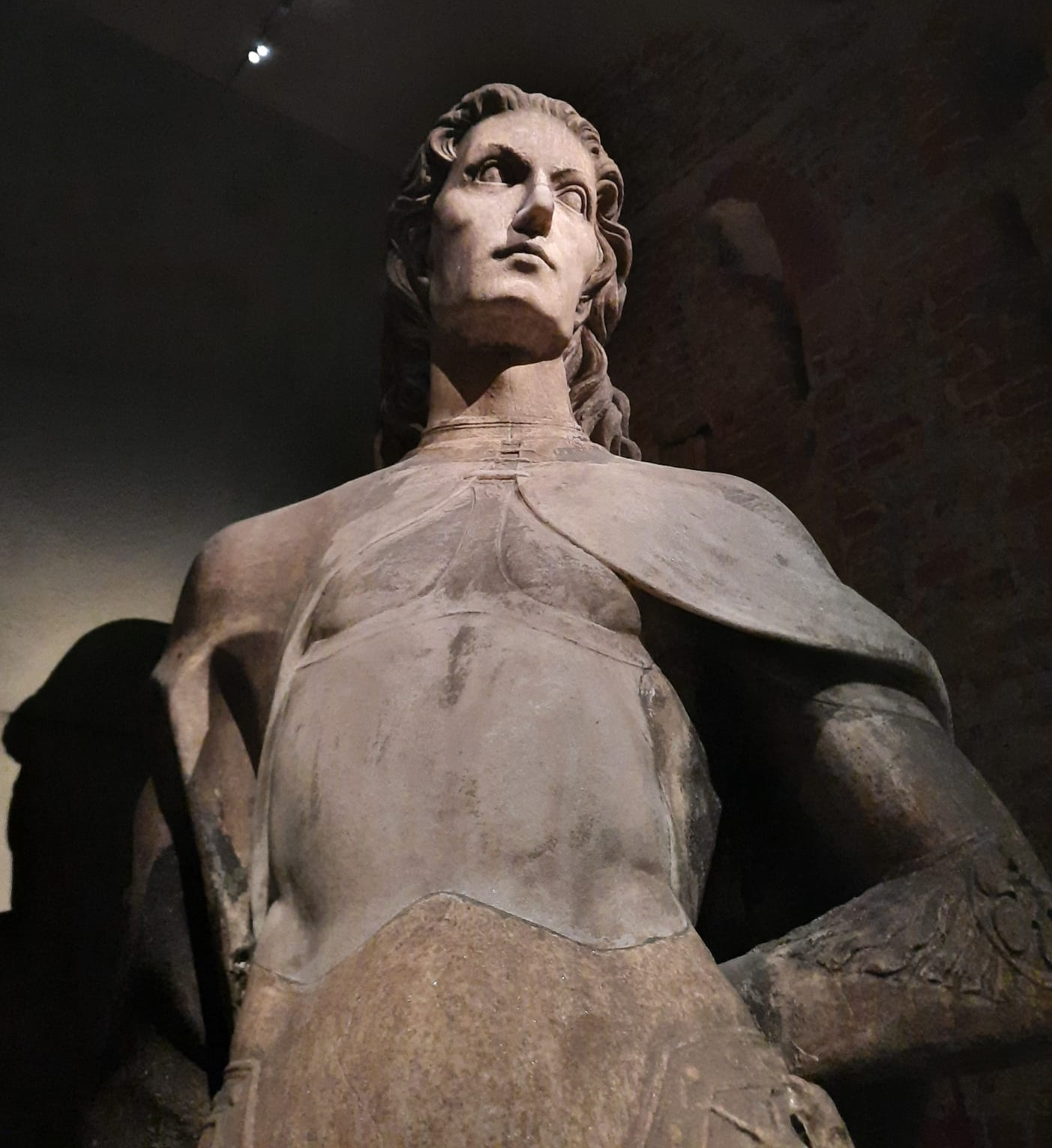
Probable portrait of Galeazzo Sanseverino, statue in the collection of the Great Museum of the Duomo of Milan.

On the morning of 27 May, the fleet reached Malamocco, where they were welcomed by a delegation of patricians. Beatrice then landed on Isola di San Clemente, where the doge waited for her. They boarded the Bucentaur together, headed for the Grand Canal. During the journey, a play was performed on a barge about the dispute between Minerva and Neptune that led to the foundation of Athens. Beatrice and her family stayed at the Fondaco dei Turchi, owned by the Estes. She was invited to a meeting of the Great Council and to a ceremonious breakfast at the Doge's Palace. She also visited the Arsenal, Murano, St Mark's Basilica and the treasury.

In one of her letters to her husband, Beatrice relayed that while walking through Piazza San Marco, a man's eye lingered too impolitely long on her neckline, with the excuse of admiring her ruby necklace; she responded, "I had a necklace of pearls and a ruby on my chest [...] and there were those who put their eyes almost up to my chest to look at him and I saw so much anxiety I told him we had to come home, since I would have gladly shown it ".

Finally, on 30 May, she secretly received in her chamber three delegated from the Signoria, with whom she talked alone, presenting a document from her husband that contained an account of Ludovico's actions for securing his investiture as duke of Milan from the Emperor. Then she showed a letter from him that had just arrived, saying, "this [her husband's position] is stronger now". This letter announced King Charles VIII's intention to attack Naples, appointing Ludovico head of the offensive. Ludovico wished to know the opinion of the Signoria, asking that it be communicated to his wife before her departure from Venice or otherwise to himself in Milan. The Venetians replied that what they heard was very serious, but only offered vague reassurances. Beatrice's mission had little hope of success from the beginning because of Venice's reluctance.

=== First Italian War ===
On 25 January 1494, the old king Ferrante died, who already foreshadowed the outbreak of a war that he had tried with all his might to avoid. Once ascended to the throne of Naples, his son Alfonso II did not hesitate to rush to the aid of his daughter Isabella, declaring war on his brother-in-law Ludovico and occupying, as the first sign of hostility, the city of Bari. Ludovico responded to the threats by leaving the green light to King Charles VIII of France to go down to Italy to conquer the kingdom of Naples, which he believed to be right, having been taken from the Aragonese from the Anjou.

==== Gallant receptions ====
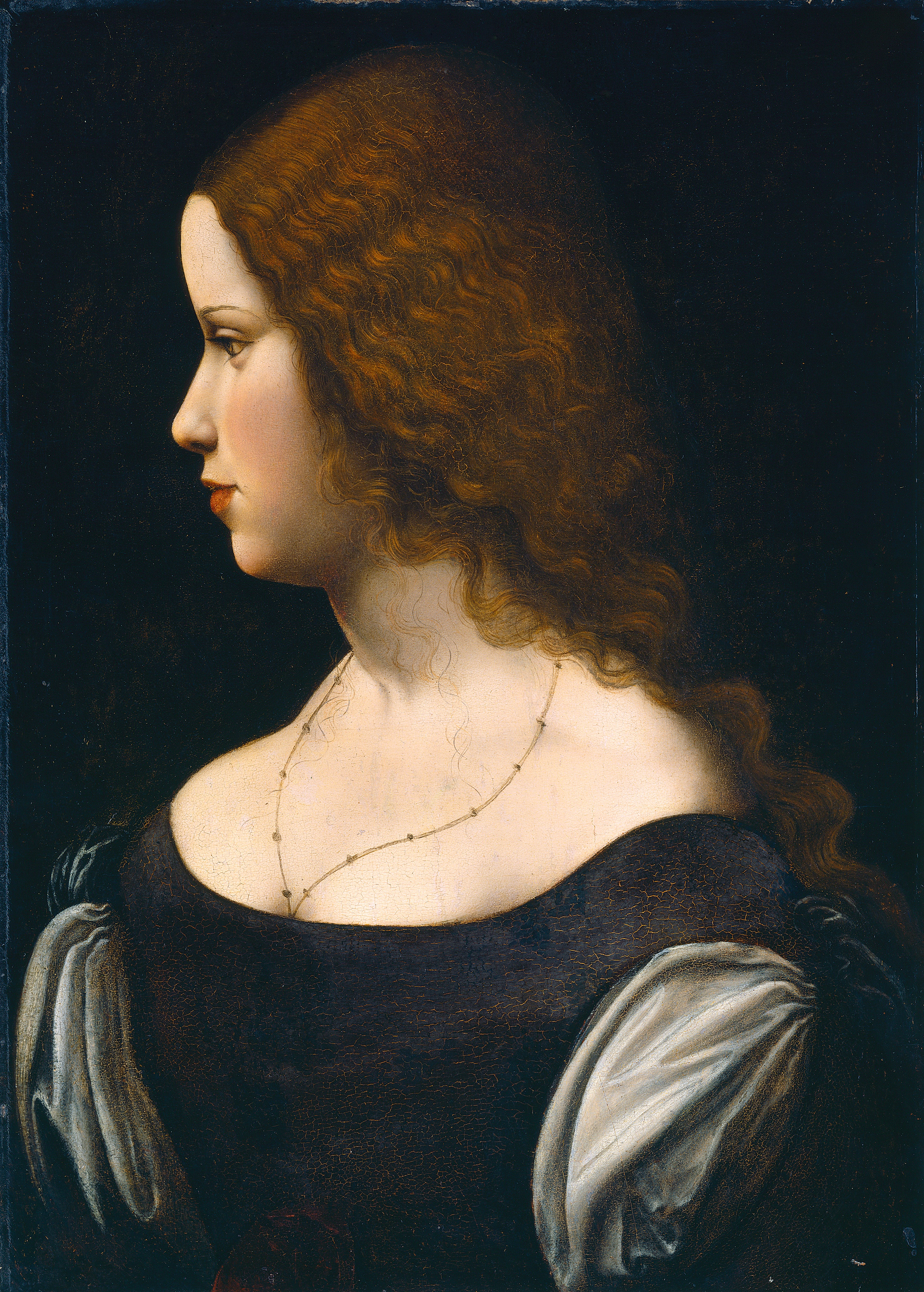
Portrait of a young woman, 15th century, circle of Leonardo da Vinci. Identified as a portrait of Beatrice d'Este

On 23 July 1494, she welcomed duke Louis of Orléans, cousin of the King of France, to Milan, who arrived in Italy with the avant-gardes of the army French, then, on 11 September of the same year, went to Asti to meet Charles VIII in person. The two were greeted with great riots and parties, and both claimed, according to the custom French, to kiss the duchess and all the beautiful bridesmaids of her retinue on the mouth.

This custom of "kiss and touch" the women of others initially aroused some annoyance in the Italians, who never willingly got used to it. Moreover, as Baldassarre Castiglione would also say years later, Louis of Orleans used to look a little too mischievously at women, "who are said to like them very much". Nevertheless, Beatrice, through Ambassador Capilupi, also invited her sister to come and kiss Count Gilbert of Bourbon and others who would soon arrive.

King Charles, in particular, was greatly fascinated: he wanted to see her dance and requested a portrait of her, personally taking care of procuring the painter (Jean Perréal) and about twenty clothes to see which one was better worn by Beatrice, who was "more beautiful than ever". The relations between the Duchess and Louis of Orleans were also extremely gallant at the beginning, and the two frequently exchanged gifts with affectionate cards.

Ludovico was not jealous of her: different was the case of the handsome baron of Beauvau, much loved by women, who showed excessive "enthusiasm" towards Beatrice. According to some historians, it was for this reason that Ludovico, offended by the assiduity of the knight, took advantage of an illness of King Charles to remove his wife from Asti, who in fact retired to Annone, while he continued alone to go to Asti every day. A Beauvau actually participated in the enterprise of Naples, but his identity is not clear: currently it is more plausible the identification with Bertrand de Beauvau, son of Antoine and count of Policastro. Remembered as a "valiant and daring" fighter, he died in Naples in battle in 1495.

==== The ducal investiture ====
Soon, realizing that his plans had not gone as planned, Ludovico abandoned the alliance with the French and joined the Holy League, expressly formed between the various Italian powers to drive foreigners from the peninsula. Meanwhile, on 21 October 1494, the legitimate Duke Gian Galeazzo died and Ludovico obtained by acclamation of the senate that the ducal title passed to him and his legitimate descendants, thus bypassing in the succession the son that Gian Galeazzo left.

Beatrice, who was pregnant at that time, gave birth on 4 February 1495, Sforza Francesco, so named in honour of his late paternal uncle Sforza Maria, to whom Ludovico had been very fond, and of his grandfather Francesco. The newborn was baptized by his aunt Isabella d'Este with fifteen names, but was then called simply Francesco.

The official investiture by the emperor came on 26 May 1495 and was solemnized by a large public ceremony in the Duomo.

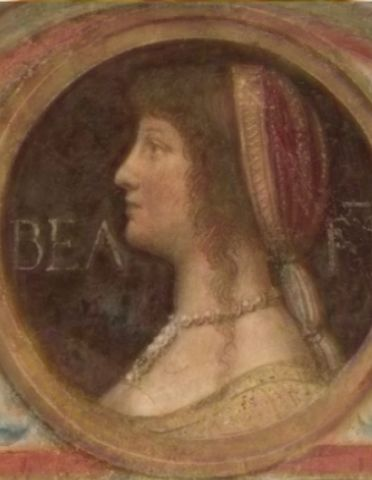
Lunette of Beatrice d'Este in Palazzo degli Atellani in Milan, early sixteenth century, perhaps by Bernardino Luini.

==== The siege of Novara ====
Soon, realizing that his plans had not gone as planned, Ludovico abandoned the alliance with the French and joined the Holy League, expressly formed among the various Italian powers to drive foreigners from the peninsula. While Charles, after the conquest of Naples, was still in the kingdom, in a situation of serious tension, on 11 June 1495, contravening the orders of the king, Louis of Orléans occupied the city of Novara with his men and went as far as Vigevano, threatening concretely to attack Milan with the intention of usurping the duchy, which he considered his right being a descendant of Valentina Visconti.

Ludovico hastened to close himself with his wife and children in the Rocca del Castello in Milan but, not feeling equally safe, he contemplated leaving the duchy to take refuge in Spain. Only the iron opposition of his wife and some members of the council, convinced him to desist from this idea.

However, due to the heavy expenses incurred for the investiture, the state was on the verge of financial collapse, and there was no money to maintain the army; a popular uprising was feared. The Commines writes that, if the Duke of Orleans had advanced only a hundred steps, the Milanese army would have passed the Ticino, and he would have managed to enter Milan, since some noble citizens had offered to introduce it.

Ludovico did not resist the tension and was struck, it seems, by a stroke that left him paralyzed for a short time. "The Duke of Milan has lost his feelings," Malipiero writes, "he abandons himself." Beatrice therefore found herself alone to face the difficult situation of war. However, he managed to juggle very well and to ensure the support and loyalty of the Milanese nobles. It was then that her husband officially appointed her governor of Milan together with her brother Alfonso, who soon came to their rescue. The latter, however, soon fell ill with syphilis, also it was rumoured that Duke Ercole did not want the recovery of Novara, being in league with the French, and together with the Florentines secretly subveded the Orleans, and that Fracasso, a stronghold of the Sforza army, played a double game with the king of France.

Beatrice therefore decided, on 27 June, to go alone to the military camp of Vigevano to supervise the order and animate the captains against the French, despite the fact that the Duke of Orleans made raids in that area all day long, while her husband remained in Milan. On this occasion she demonstrated – not unlike her male relatives – a remarkable inclination to war. This is considerable when one considers that the conduct of war operations was at that time the prerogative of men. More than the kinship with her father, whose help she asked for help in vain, the alliance with Venice proved fruitful, which sent Bernardo Contarini, provveditore of the stratioti, to the rescue, with whom Beatrice became friends. Some severed heads of the French were brought to her by the stratioti, and she rewarded them with a ducat for each.

Guicciardini's opinion is that if Louis d'Orléans had attempted the assault immediately, he would have taken Milan since the defence was inconsistent, but Beatrice's demonstration of strength was perhaps worth confusing him in making him believe the defences superior to what they were so that he did not dare to try his luck and retreated into Novara. The hesitation was fatal to him, as it allowed the army to reorganize and surround him, thus forcing him to a long and exhausting siege that decimated his men due to famine and epidemics, a siege from which he was finally defeated a few months later on the imposition of King Charles who returned to France.

In early August, finally healed, Ludovico went with his wife to the Camp of Novara, where they resided for a few weeks during the siege. On the occasion of their visit was held, for the pleasure of the duchess who greatly appreciated the facts of arms, a memorable parade of the army in full. Beatrice's presence did not have to garbare much to the Marquis of Mantua her brother-in-law, then captain-general of the League, if at some point he invited not too kindly Ludovico to lock his wife "in coffers".

Since the Germans wanted to make "cruel revenge" against the Italians, Ludovico begged Francesco to save Beatrice, fearing that she would be raped or killed. The marquis with an intrepid spirit rode among the Germans and not without great effort managed to mediate peace. "Understanding success, Ludovico became the happiest man in the world, seeming to him that he had recovered the State and his life, and together with honour his wife, for whose safety he feared more than for everything else".

Beatrice personally participated in the council of war, as well as in the peace negotiations, as well as having participated in all the meetings held previously with the French, who did not fail to be amazed to see her actively collaborating alongside her husband.

After the Battle of Fornovo (1495), both he and his wife took part in the peace congress of Vercelli between Charles VIII of France and the Italian princes, at which Beatrice showed great political ability.

In the summer of 1496 Beatrice and the Moor met Maximilian I of Habsburg in Malles. The emperor was particularly kind to the Duchess, going so far as to personally cut the dishes on her plate, and wanted her to sit in the middle between himself and the duke. Sanuto then notes that "a contemplation di la duchessa de Milano", that is, by the will of her, or rather by the desire to see her again, Maximilian passed "that mountain so harsh" and in a completely informal way, without any pomp, came to Como, then stayed for some time in Vigevano in strictly friendly relations with the dukes. He probably admired it for its hunting skills and tenacious character, but his visit also had a political purpose: to urge the emperor to the enterprise of Pisa in an anti-French function.

=== Death ===
In recent months, however, relations between the two spouses had become very worn out due to the adulterous relationship that Ludovico had with Lucrezia Crivelli, his wife's lady-in-waiting. Despite the bad moods, Beatrice found herself pregnant for the third time, but the pregnancy was complicated both by the sorrows caused by the discovery that Lucrezia was also expecting a child from Ludovico, something for which she felt deeply humiliated and by the premature and tragic death of the beloved Bianca Giovanna, Ludovico's illegitimate daughter and her dear friend from the first day of arrival in Milan. The birth finally took place on the night between 2 and 3 January 1497, but neither the mother nor the son survived.

In a letter written hours after her death, Ludovico informed his brother-in-law Francesco Gonzaga that his wife, "gave back her spirit to God" half an hour after midnight. Their child had been born at eleven at night and was a stillborn son. Ludovico went mad with pain and for two weeks remained locked up in the dark in his apartments, after which he shaved his head and let his beard grow, wearing from that moment on only black clothes with a torn cloak of a beggar. His only concern became the embellishment of the family mausoleum and the neglected state fell into disrepair.

He told the Ferrarese ambassador that "he never thought he could ever tolerate such a bitter plague", and that he had had him summoned to report to Duke Ercole that if what had ever offended her, as he knew he had done, he asks forgiveness from your ex. your and her, finding himself discontented to the soul ", since" in every prayer he had always prayed to our Lord God that she left after him, as the one in whom he had assumed all his rest, and since God did not like it, he prayed to him and would always pray to him continually, that if it is ever possible for a living person to see a dead, grant him the grace that he may see her and speak to her one last time, as the one he loved more than himself ".

The Emperor Maximilian, in condoning with the Moro, wrote that "nothing heavier or more annoying could happen to us at this time, than to be so suddenly deprived of a joint among the other princesses dear to us, after the beginning more abundant familiarity of his virtues, and that you in truth, who are primarily loved by us, have been deprived not only of a sweet consort, but of an ally of your principality, of the relief from your troubles and occupations. [...] Your most happy consort did not lack any virtue or luck or body or soul that could be desired by anyone; no dignity, no merit that could be added".

She was buried in the choir of the church of Santa Maria delle Grazie in Milan. The duke commissioned a funeral monument for himself and his wife to Cristoforo Solari, but following his death in captivity in France, the monument was broken up, and the tomb lid transferred to the Certosa di Pavia where it still stands today.

In 1499 Louis d'Orléans returned a second time to claim the Duchy of Milan and, since Beatrice was no longer there to face him, he had an easy game on the dejected Moro, who after an escape and a brief return ended his days as a prisoner in France.

==== The burial ====
After an impressive funeral, during which it was said that Ludovico remarried her as if she were alive, Beatrice was buried in the choir of the church of Santa Maria delle Grazie. The duke commissioned Cristoforo Solari to create a magnificent funeral monument with their two recumbent figures carved in marble, but, due to the French conquest of the duchy, it remained unfinished. Following the provisions of the Council of Trent on burials (1564), it was broken up and largely dispersed. Only the lid with the funeral statues, for the mercy of the Carthusian monks, was saved, and purchased for the small sum of 38 scudi it was transferred empty to the Certosa di Pavia, where it is still today.

== Appearance and personality ==
=== Physical aspect ===
The portraits that remain of her and the descriptions of her contemporaries give us the image of a curvaceous young woman, pleasant, with a small nose that was slightly turned upwards, full cheeks typical of the Aragonese, a short and round chin, dark eyes and long brown hair down to the waist that she always kept wrapped in a coazzone, with a few strands left to fall on the cheeks, a costume that she had already assumed during her childhood in Naples by the will of her ancestor Ferrante, whose influence made her adopt a Castilian attitude and fashion.

Francesco Muralto presents her as "at a young age, beautiful with raven hair". Beatrice was of short stature and therefore used to wear heels to reduce the difference in height with her husband, who was around 190 cm tall. In the International Footwear Museum of Vigevano, there is a shoe dating back to the late fifteenth century attributed to the Duchess which, based on its size, puts her height between 150 and 160 cm.

=== Personality ===
Beatrice was of a happy, carefree, playful character, but, not unlike all her brothers, she was also unreflective, violent, impulsive and easily let herself be carried away by anger. Proof of this are many episodes of the Milanese period, including a famous one that happened in April 1491 when, going with some of her ladies to the market disguised as a commoner, she was surprised by a downpour, and while returning to the castle she squabbled on the street with certain commoners who had insulted her because of the clothes with which she and the ladies had sheltered their heads from the rain, it not being customary in Milan to dress in that way. On another occasion, realizing that Ludovico wanted to make her wear a dress that he had sewed the same for Gallerani, she made a scene and demanded that Cecilia not wear it.

Proud and obstinate, she was the one who most resembled her father by nature. The buffoon Frittella judged that no one should mourn her death, as she was proud and of "feline instincts". This contrasts with the judgment of Bernardino Zambotti, who says she was "a pleasant person, virtuous and much loved by all peoples, most liberal towards her servants". "The kindest lady in Italy", a contemporary calls her.

Vincenzo Calmeta, her secretary, praised her ingenuity, affability, grace, and liberality, and exalted her court of gentlemen, musicians and poets. She was a lover of luxury so much so that the only wardrobe in her rooms at the castle of Pavia contained 84 dresses as well as countless other valuables.

Haughty and ambitious, of a dignified person, of beautiful features, yes, but male, she was distinguished by a grave and imperious air. She dressed princely; her gaze breathed her command; her smile did not set her lip; but a kind of joviality of condescension appeared in it. Such was this woman, who knew not a little empire of her to exercise over her husband himself; who both knew how to deceive others. Lodovico il Moro lacked daring; and it was Beatrice who always came to her aid in this part.

— Giovanni Campiglio, Lodovico il Moro.

==== The pranks ====
The court of Milan loved pranks, and Beatrice was no exception. Ludovico writes that one morning, she had fun with her cousin Isabella by trying to throw her ladies off their horses. In the same manner, Beatrice once threw her cousin to the ground. The most terrible jokes, however, were all against the serious Este ambassador Giacomo Trotti, at the time seventy years old, who found his house several times invaded by "large quantities of foxes, wolves and wild cats", that Ludovico bought and that Beatrice, having realized how much the ambassador hated such animals, had sneaked into the ambassador's home.

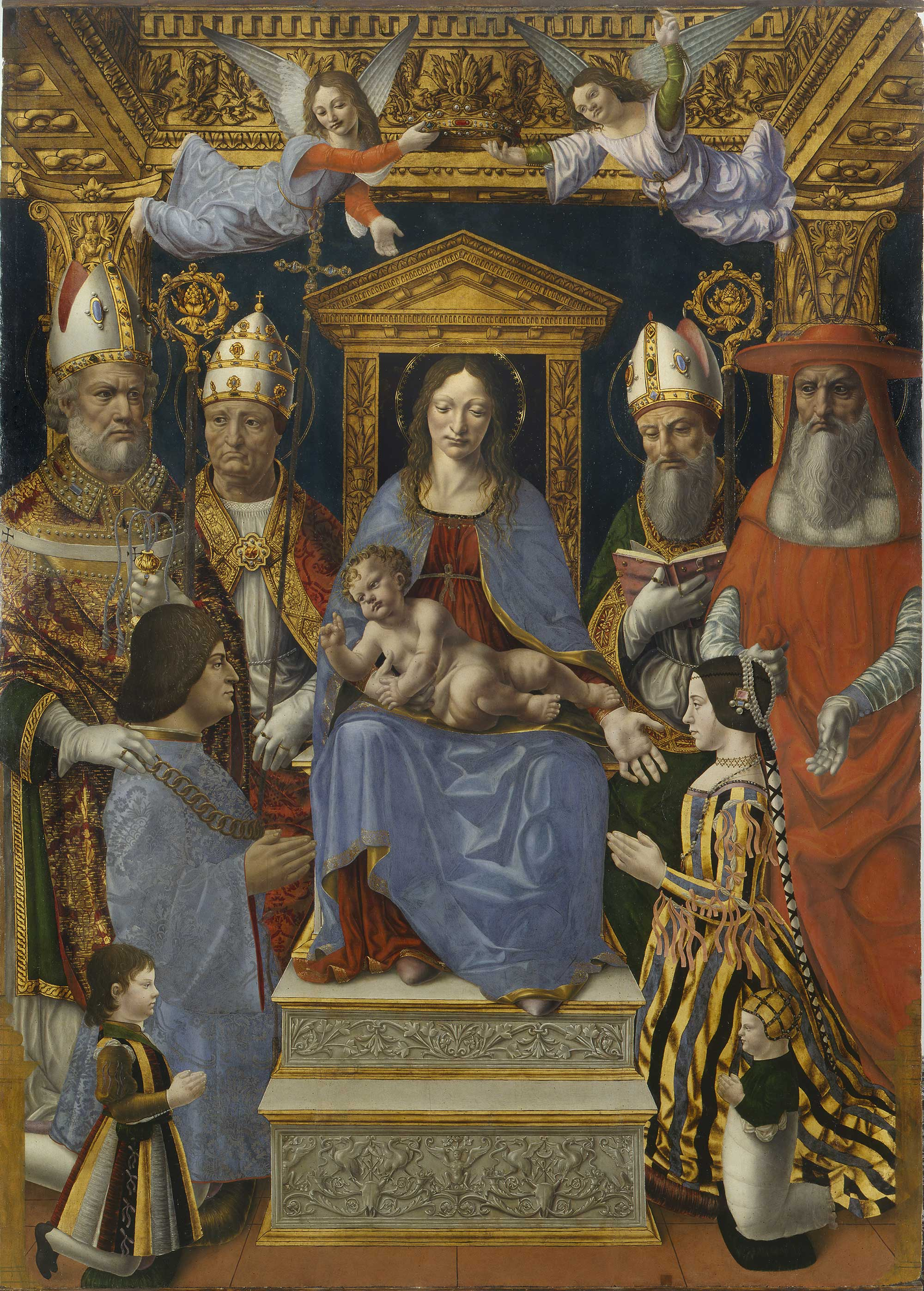
Pala Sforzesca, c. 1494, by an unknown author: on the left, Ludovico with his son Cesare; on the right, Beatrice with her son Ercole Massimiliano.

Since the ambassador was also quite stingy, Beatrice even went so far as to rob him of what he was wearing, albeit for a good cause: while Ludovico held him still by the arms, she stole two golden ducats, his silk hat and his new cloak, then gave the two ducats to Trotti's niece, who was in need. The ambassador continually complained to the duchess's father, saying: "and these are my earnings, since I have the damage and insults, as well as I should waste time writing them!"

Nevertheless, Beatrice had limits and never reached the cynicism of her grandfather Ferrante. In fact, when Isabella of Aragon was widowed and remained, in mourning, locked up in the dark rooms of the castle of Pavia, forcing even her young children to dress in mourning and to suffer with her, Beatrice had great compassion and insisted that she come to Milan and improve the conditions of the children.

==== The fraternal bond ====
With her brothers, she always maintained excellent relations; she especially showed affection towards Ferrante, with whom she had grown up in Naples, and towards Alfonso, who came several times to visit her in Milan. With her sister Isabella, the relationship was more complicated because, although the two felt a sincere affection for each other, Isabella began to hold mixed feelings towards Beatrice. Isabella envied her sister's lucky marriage, enormous wealth, and, above all, the two sons in perfect health born in quick succession while she tried for years in vain to create an heir with her husband Francesco. However, over time, the envy subsided and then dissolved completely at the premature death of her sister, an event for which Isabella showed a deep and sincere pain.

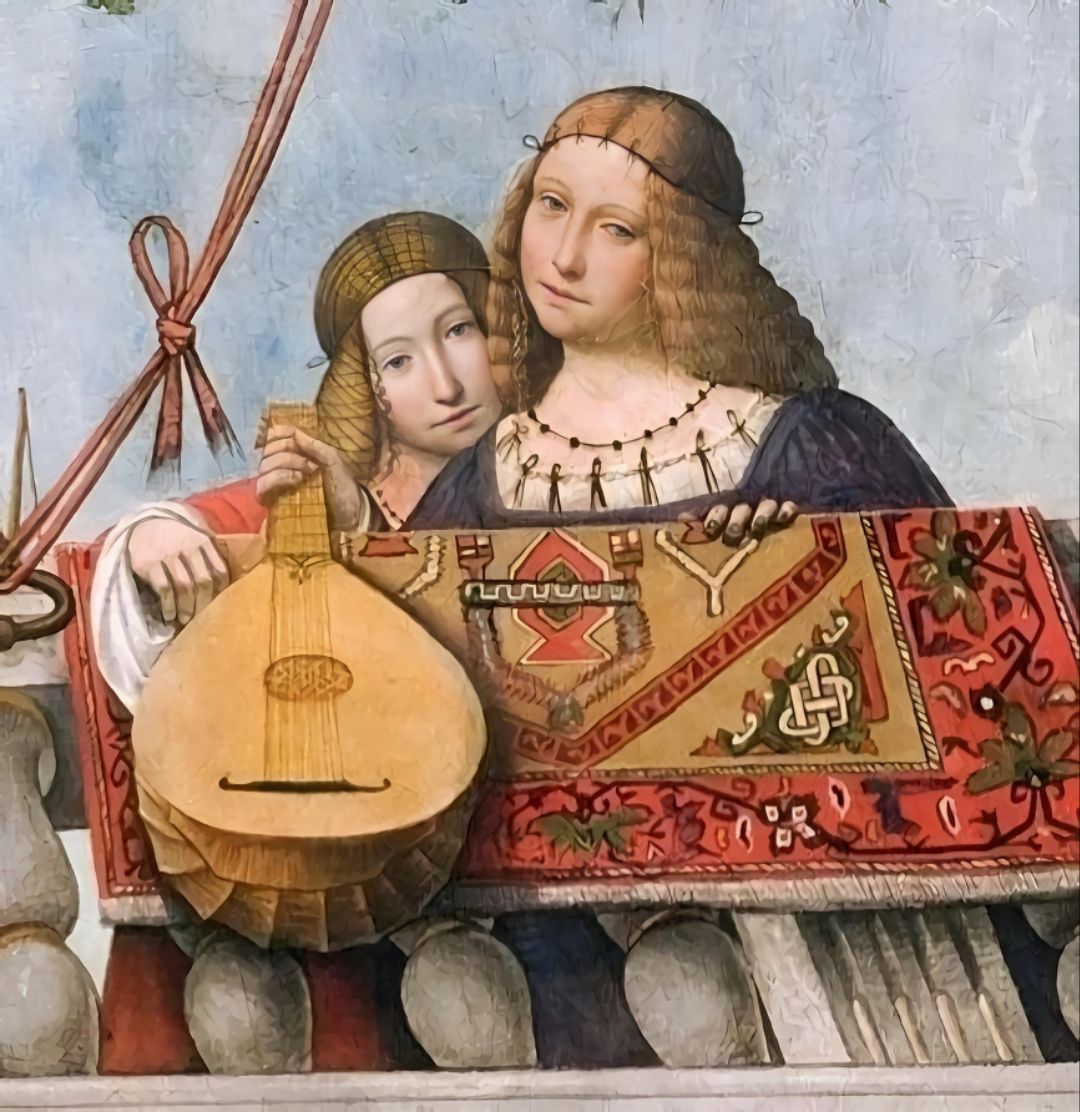
Alleged portrait, in fact quite similar, of the two sisters: Beatrice (left) and Isabella (right), in the ceiling fresco of the Sala del Tesoro of Palazzo Costabili near Ferrara. Benvenuto Tisi da Garofalo, 1503–1506.

The two sisters were, however, very different. In fact unlike Isabella, who felt resentment towards her daughters for being born female and placed the blame for their sex on her husband Francesco (who was in contrast very proud of his daughters), Beatrice was an exemplary and devoted mother, as shown in the tender letters sent to her mother Eleonora in which she described the good health and growth of the little Ercole.

==== Passions ====
Just like her grandfather Ferrante, Beatrice loved animals very much, and her husband often gave them to her: among the many, there were numerous horses, dogs, cats, foxes, wolves, a monkey and even mice. Milan Castle also had a menagerie with numerous species of exotic animals.

Beatrice showed above all on these occasions to possess a swaggering and reckless character, so much so as to put her life in danger more than once, as when in the summer of 1491, during a hunting trip, her mount was hit by a runaway deer. Ludovico tells, not without a certain admiration, that her horse leapt "as much as the height of a good spear," but that Beatrice held firmly on the saddle and that when they managed to reach her she "laughed and did not have a fear in the world."

In the same way, in the following year, while pregnant with her eldest son, Beatrice threw herself into the assault of an angry boar that had already wounded some greyhounds. The resulting fatigue caused a relapse of the malaria she had previously contracted, making the middle months of pregnancy difficult, although without damaging the unborn child or complicating the birth. She also knew how to shoot "admirably" with the crossbow; in fact, in 1493, she killed a wild boar with one.

Although very religious, Beatrice was not austere with regard to carnal matters; she knew well that wars are not won only with weapons and for this reason, some of the maids of her retinue had the task of sexually entertaining the sovereigns and foreign guests of the court. In 1495 at the camp of Novara, Beatrice did not hesitate to offer to personally procure for her brother-in-law Francesco Gonzaga, captain-general of the League, a woman with whom to celebrate his victory, officially to preserve him and her sister Isabella from the terrible Malfrancese which at that time devastated the peninsula, although perhaps she also hopes to win his sympathies, as she wished to receive some of the treasure that he had seized from the tent of Charles VIII following the battle of Fornovo.

She liked gambling and was able to win the extraordinary sum of 3000 ducats in a single day. She particularly loved to dance, an art in which she excelled with singular grace; Muralto says she was able to spend the whole night uninterruptedly in dances, and the French marvelled that she knew how to dance perfectly according to the French fashion, despite saying that it was the first time she had done so.

However, Beatrice was quite modest as far as her own person was concerned; in fact, she entrusted herself to the services of a single midwife, Frasina da Ferrara, who was introduced to her mother. Beatrice even demanded that this midwife come to assist her in Milan during her third birth, despite the fact that the woman was sick at that time and despite the fact that her father had suggested another equally talented midwife from Ferrara. In the end, Frasina set off on a mule to reach Milan in time.

== Political role ==
=== The "damnatio memoriae" ===
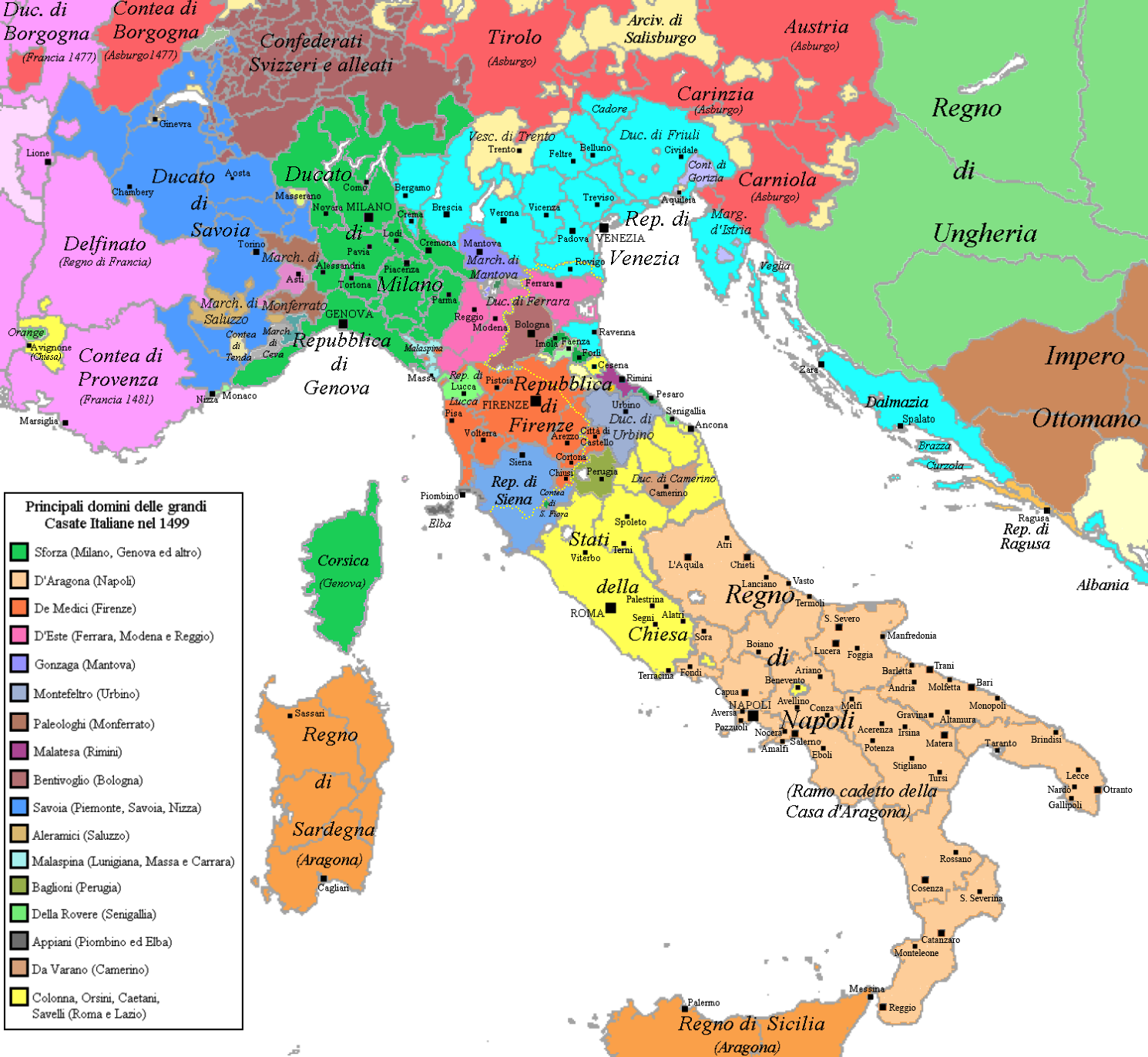
Italy around the end of the 15th century

Celebrated by nineteenth-century historians as a sort of romantic heroine, the figure of Beatrice underwent an eclipse during the twentieth century, crushed under the weight of the praise paid to her sister Isabella, who outlived her. Although a superficial analysis of historical events has led modern scholars to say that Beatrice had no voice in the politics of the duchy, or even had no interest in it, almost all previous historians agree instead in judging her as the true mastermind behind many of her husband's actions and decisions, over whom she exercised enormous influence, to such an extent that it links her presence to the prosperity and integrity of the entire Sforza state:

She owned in all respects the lands of Cassolnovo, Carlotta, Monte Imperiale, Villanova, Sartirana, Leale, Cusago, Valenza, Galliate, Mortara, Bassignana, San Secondo, Felino, Torrechiara, Castel San Giovanni, Pigliola, Valle di Lugano, as well as the Sforzesca and the park of the castle of Pavia, that her husband had given her, with all the relative possessions, fortresses and feudal rights connected to them, that is the mero et mixto imperio, any type of jurisdiction, gifts, immunities, etc., the faculty to administer them according to one's own will, to delegate castellans, praetors, officers, etc., as well as to benefit from the very rich rents.

As early as January 1492, Ludovico showed his intention to make her sole governor of the state during his absences, and so every day the council was held and the acts of government were read to her in her room. Furthermore, her role in the diplomatic mission to Venice, alongside her constant presence in the war councils and meetings with the French and, above all, her decisive stance at a time when Orleans threatened Milan, in stark contrast to her husband’s perceived cowardice and the declining state of the Sforza family, show that her political interest and involvement were far more substantial than is usually thought.

=== Political Thought ===
She initially pursued the policy of her father Ercole, who for years had been plotting to replace Ludovico to Gian Galeazzo in the actual possession of the duchy of Milan and who, with this precise purpose, had given her to him in marriage. It is to be believed that without the interference of his wife, Ludovico would never have taken the step of usurping the duchy to his nephew in all respects and that he would have been content to continue to govern him as regent as he had been doing for more than ten years. It is no coincidence that it was Beatrice herself who said that, with the birth of the little Ercole Massimiliano, she had given birth to a son to her husband and also to her father.

When then, with the change of alliances, Hercules, although officially neutral, continued to lean towards the French, while Louis sided with the Holy League, Beatrice felt betrayed by her father who, in a moment of maximum difficulty, that is, in the days immediately preceding the occupation of Novara by Orléans, did not want to send them the requested aid. She then abandoned her daughter's robes to assume that of head of state, with a letter that for its exceptionally harsh and authoritative tone arouses amazement: she wrote to her father that she would have expected, in such a situation, that he himself would come to their defence, and that he does not understand how he did not want to send even two hundred men of arms, worrying what would have been said in Italy when it had been known about this refusal; therefore she invites him to remedy this lack so as not to leave in her and in her husband the ill will towards her, all the more so since, if he were to be attacked, two hundred men of arms would not be enough for him to defend Ferrara without external help.

Perhaps also as a result of this, after Novara, his attitude became more distinctly pro-Venetian. She also carried out an important work of mediation between her husband and the various leaders on the one hand – who resorted to her, as in the case of Fracasso, to obtain favours – and between her husband and the Italian lords on the other. The few surviving letters show her participating in all her husband's secrets, and her correspondence with Francesco Gonzaga is also remarkable.

According to the testimony of Sanudo, it was Beatrice who urged the coming to Italy of Emperor Maximilian in 1496, Since her death, the Faenza people were very upset, judging that Astorre Manfredi would have lost the favour of Milan Faenza, pro-Venetian, was an enemy of Forlì, pro-Florentine, of which was countess Caterina Sforza, nephew of Ludovico. Beatrice must have persuaded her husband to extend her protection to Faenza and it was feared, with his death, a reversal of alliances, which then in fact happened with the war of Pisa, when Ludovico abandoned the ally Venice for Florence, a move that then marked his ruin. Malipiero rejoiced instead, saying: "and with this death will cease so much intelligence that son-in-law and father-in-law had together".

In Beatrice, moreover, Ludovico had placed all his hopes for the succession and for the maintenance of the state during the minority of the children, since he had always been convinced that he would die before her.

"And true, the death of Beatrice, the superb and intelligent Ferrarese, was a serious disaster for Ludovico il Moro. She was the soul of all his undertakings, she was the true queen of his heart and his court [...]. If the Duke of Bari [...] managed to represent on the theatre of Europe a scene of much superior, as was observed, to his condition, it is largely due to this woman, vain feminally, if you will, and cruel, especially with the Duchess Isabella, but of resolute and tenacious character, of ready ingenuity, of the soul open to all the seductions of luxury and to all the attractions of art. When it [...] failed [...] it was like a great storm that came to upset the soul of Ludovico. Nor did he ever recover from it; that death was the beginning of his misfortunes. Gloomy premonitions crossed his mind; it seemed to him that he had remained alone in a great stormy sea and inclined, fearfully, to asceticism. [...] the ghost of his beautiful and poor dead man was always before his spirit."(Rodolfo Renier, Gaspare Visconti)

=== Loyalty ===
Unlike his relatives and his sister Isabella, with whom Ludovico himself claimed years later to have had a secret relationship, Beatrice never fell back even the slightest suspicion of adultery. She always maintained a reputation of absolute honesty, and this in spite of the freedoms in dressing and relating to men: the courtships of chivalrous mold entertained with the French and with the emperor are striking, where in fact the fulfilment of the sexual act was delegated to special courtesans. Precisely because he trusted her blindly, Ludovico granted her enormous freedom, and the only hint of her jealousy refers to the Baron of Beauvau.

Only Achille Dina, a twentieth-century historian, insinuates – but without any evidence – of an affair between her and Galeazzo Sanseverino, arguing that "some intimate remorse" was due to Beatrice's deep sorrow for the death of her stepdaughter: "perhaps his conduct towards Isabella? or something in her relations with Bianca's husband, the charming Galeazzo Sanseverino, whose intrinsic and continuous commonality of pleasures with her cannot fail to strike?"

Beatrice, on the other hand, was aware of her husband's extramarital affairs, but did not give them weight because she knew they were passing distractions. The balance was drastically upset with the appearance of Lucrezia Crivelli in the ranks of the mistresses, as Beatrice had to realize that this time Ludovico had seriously fallen in love and that he had begun to dedicate to the new lover all the care and attention that he once dedicated to her. Muralto specifies that Beatrice "was honored with the greatest care by Ludovico, even though he took Lucrezia Crivelli as his concubine; because of which, although the thing gnawed at the entrails of his wife, love nevertheless did not depart from her".

== Fashion ==
Beatrice is now known for her skill for creating new clothes, which was one of her greatest passions. As long as she lived, she had no rivals in any court; she dictated fashion in many cities of the time, and it was following her example that numerous Italian noblewomen, even outside the Milanese court, adopted the coazzone hairstyle, which came very much into vogue.

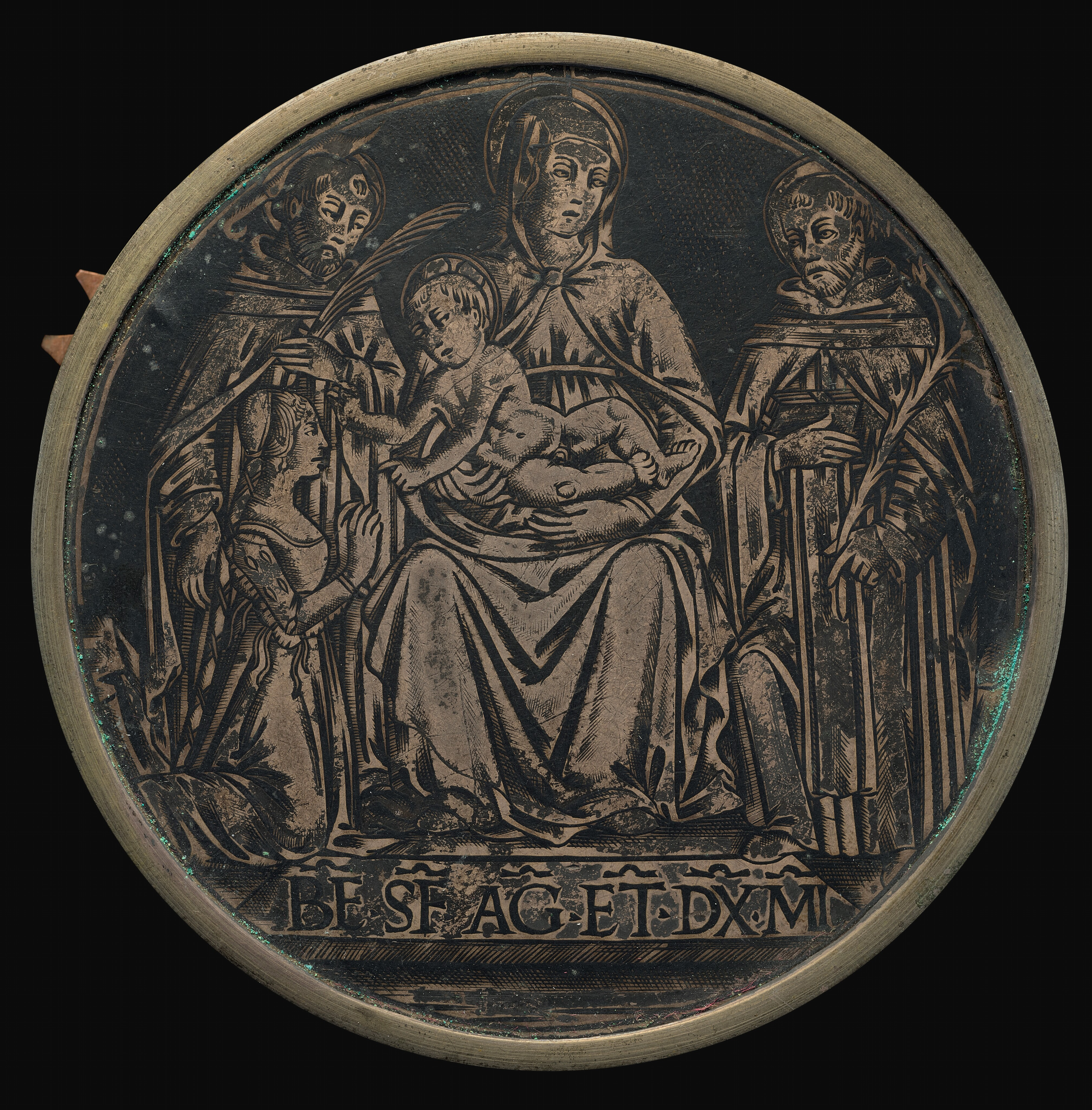

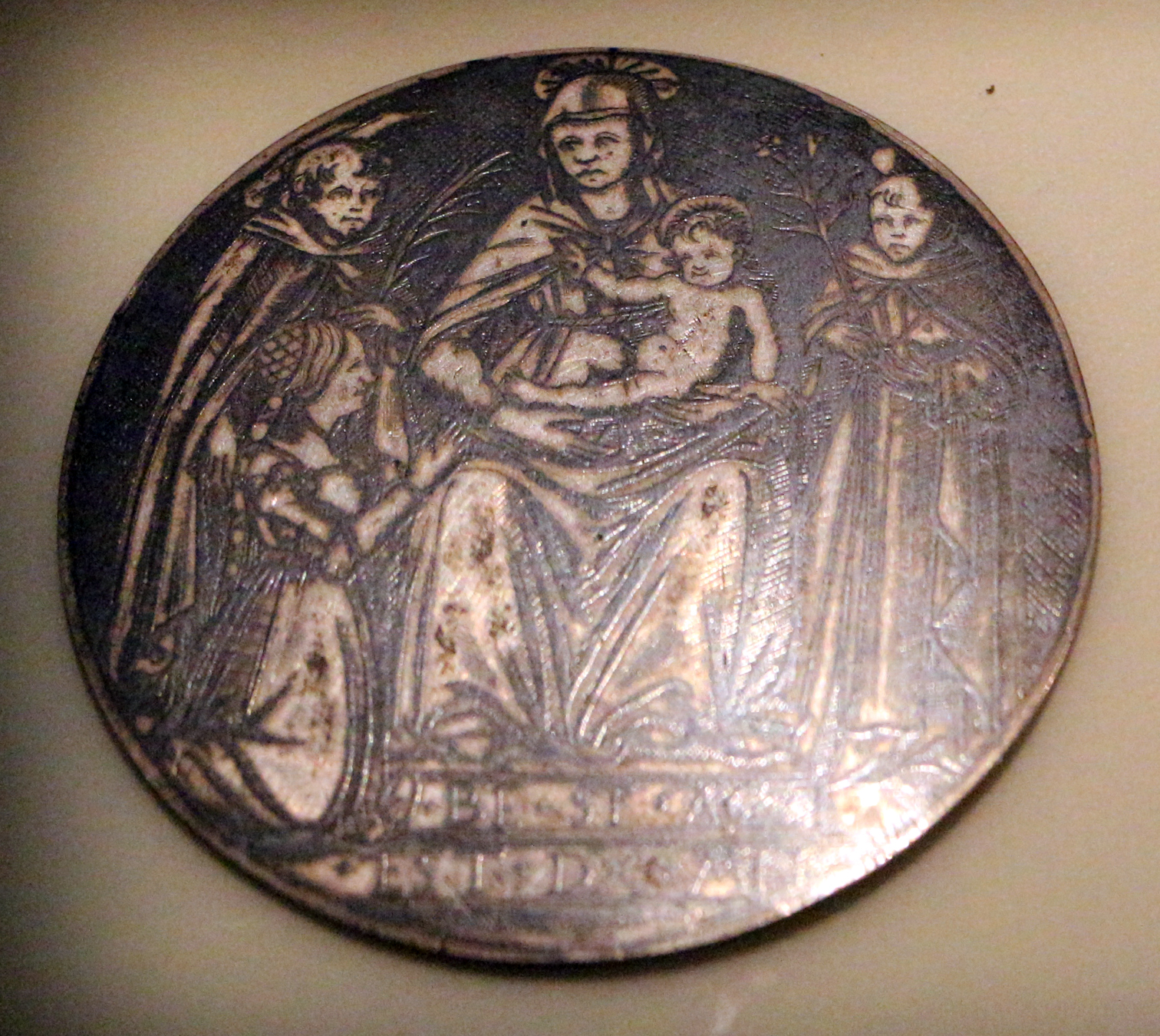
Nielli depicting Beatrice kneeling before the Virgin, c. 1495. The very long coazzone stands out, and the waist is still tight, despite the two pregnancies.

Francesco Muralto remembers her as "inventor of new clothes", role of which she herself shows full awareness when, in a letter to her sister, she apologizes for having "little imagination to make new inventions" at that time, because of the pain for the loss of her mother. Thanks to the correspondence of the ubiquitous Trotti and the letters of Beatrice herself to her sister and husband, many descriptions of her rich clothes and inventions are preserved. An absolute novelty was, for example, striped dresses like the one she wears in the Pala Sforzesca, and hers would also seem to be the idea of highlighting the waist by tightening around it a cord of large pearls that she defined in St. Francis style. The pearls of the rest were her greatest habit and since childhood, she made constant use of them, both in the form of a necklace, and in hairstyles and as a decoration of clothes. She preferred deep, square-shaped necklines and fabrics decorated with Sforza and Este exploits, especially with the motif of the Vincian knots designed by Leonardo da Vinci. She sometimes wore hats jewelled with magpie feather and more extravagant uses are also known, such as the solid gold chain that she would seem to wear in the bust carved on the Portal of the room of the sink of the Certosa di Pavia, which was of exclusively male use.

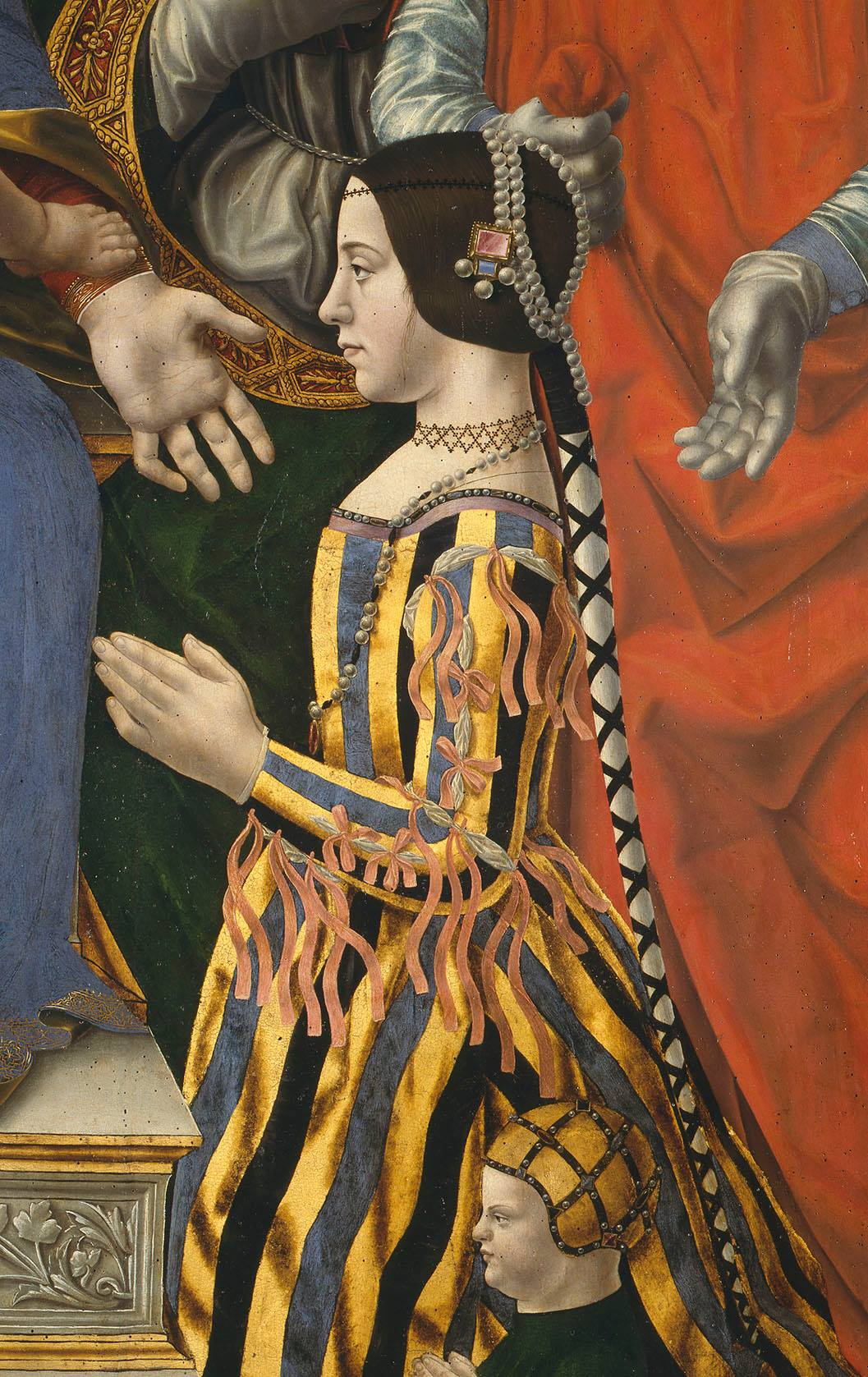
Beatrice with her son Ercole Massimiliano. Detail from the Pala Sforzesca, ca. 1494–1495. Currently in the Pinacoteca di Brera, Milan.

Her taste in dress particularly struck the French courtiers following Charles VIII, who spent themselves in extensive descriptions; the poet André de la Vigne, in his work in verse Le Vergier d'honneur, remembers his excessive ostentatious luxury:

Avecques luy fist venir sa partie
qui de Ferrare fille du duc estoit:
de fin drap d'or en tout ou en partie
de jour en jour voulentiers se vestoit:
Chaines, colliers, affiquetz, pierrerie,
ainsi qu'on dit en ung commun proverbe,
tant en avoit que c'estoit diablerie.
Brief mieulx valoit le lyen que le gerbe.
Autour du col bagues, joyaulx, carcans,
et pour son chief de richesse estoffer,
bordures d'or, devises et brocans:
ung songe estoit de la voir triumpher.

— André de la Vigne, Le Vergier d'honneur
Translation:

With him he brought his wife,
the one who was the daughter of the Duke of Ferrara:
at the end of the golden cloth in whole or in part,
from day to day she willingly dressed:
chains, necklaces, brooches, precious stones;
as a common proverb says,
he had so many that it was a devilry.
In short, the chain is worth more than the garland.
Around the neck rings, jewels, collars,
and around the head of riches embellished,
gold borders, mottos and brocades:
a dream was to see it triumph.

== Patronage ==
Beatrice d'Este belonged to the best class of Renaissance women and was one of the cultural influences of the age; to a great extent, her patronage and good taste are responsible for the splendour of the Castello Sforzesco in Milan, the Certosa of Pavia, and many other famous buildings in Lombardy.

Beatrice was mainly interested in poetry and gathered around her an excellent circle of poets in the vernacular, which included, among others, Vincenzo Calmeta, Gaspare Visconti, Niccolò da Correggio, Bernardo Bellincioni, Antonio Cammelli and Serafino Aquilano. According to some, this is a sign of the fact that she did not master Latin, although she had as a tutor the humanist Battista Guarino; in any case, she favoured the affirmation of vulgar literature in Milan.

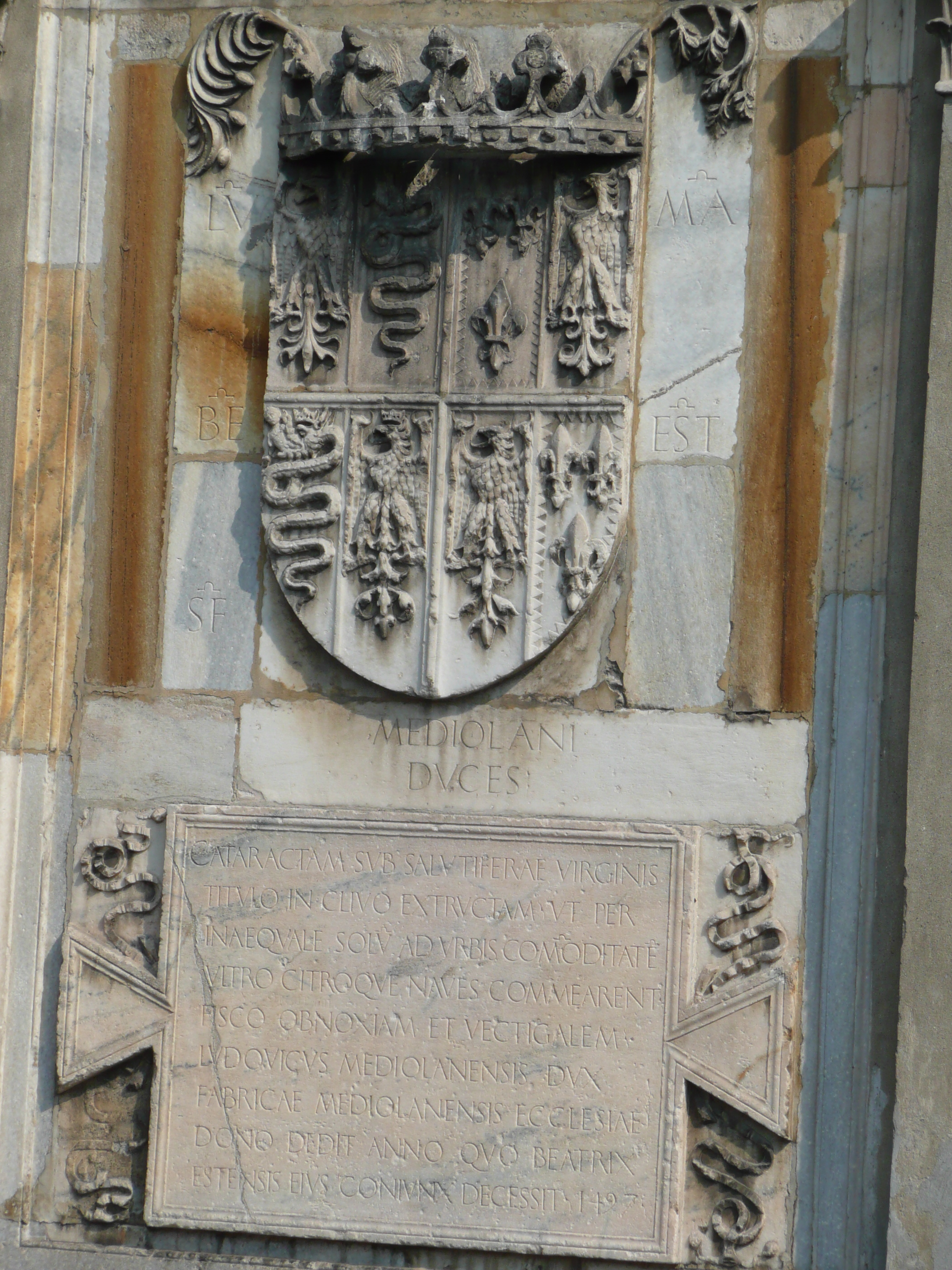
Union of the Sforza and Este coat of arms, tombstone in memory of Duke Ludovico il Moro and his wife Beatrice d'Este, Conca di Viarenna in Milan,1497.

Music was a family passion, and therefore, in her travels, she was always accompanied by musicians and singers. She was a player of viola, lute and clavichord, and learned dance and singing from Ambrogio da Urbino and Lorenzo Lavagnolo.

She left an epistolary of at least four hundred surviving letters, which out of habit she almost always wrote by her own hand and not using secretaries, as was customary at the time. Many were lost or destroyed, especially in relation to 1496, perhaps as a result of the high political content, but some appear notable for their exquisite descriptions or burlesque and irreverent tone.

She appreciated the Latin and Greek comedies and tragedies, but above all the Provençal chivalric poems and the Carolingian cycle, which in those years Matteo Maria Boiardo kept alive. She especially loved to listen to the commentary on the Divine Comedy held for her by Antonio Grifo, a passion also shared by her husband, who often stopped to listen to her readings.

Beautiful, shrewd, wife of a prince of such splendour, wide of protection to those who had recourse to her for employment or grace, she drew around a very flowery court of which she showed the soul, the delight. Her triumph marked Isabella's defeat.

— Ignazio Cantù, Beatrice o La corte di Lodovico il Moro.

She was a member of an Italian court that was associated with a number of artists and intellectuals, including Leonardo da Vinci, Ambrogio de Predis, Giovanni Antonio Boltraffio, Andrea Solari, Bramante and Amadeo, Gian Cristoforo Romano, Cristoforo Solari, Caradosso, Baldassarre Castiglione, Franchino Gaffurio, Lorenzo Gusnasco, Jacopo di San Secondo, Antonio Testagrossa.

At her death, as Vincenzo Calmeta wrote, "everything went to ruin and precipice, and from happy heaven to dark hell the court was converted, so that each virtuous was forced to take another path". Thus began the slow diaspora of Milanese poets, artists and writers, forced, especially after the definitive fall of the Moro, to seek their fortune elsewhere.

== Portraits ==
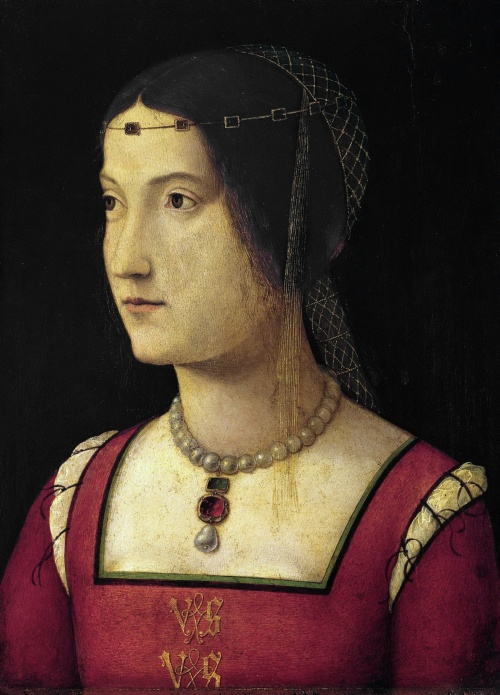
Portrait of a lady in red, Bernardino Zaganelli. Here too the necklace seems to correspond to the description of Ambassador Trotti, moreover, the motif of the Vincian knots on the bodice refers to a woman of the Sforza house.

There are many portraits of Beatrice that have come down to us, both contemporary and posthumous. Most of these are of certain identification, either because they bear the name next to it or because of the distinctive features of Beatrice, such as the coazzone.

=== Famous portraits ===
The most famous remain the bust made by Gian Cristoforo Romano, the funeral monument of Cristoforo Solari and the Sforza Altarpiece. However, Malaguzzi Valeri notes that like Solari did not bother to reproduce the true traits of Beatrice, having to the funeral statue be placed at the top of a monument and therefore seen from below and from afar, so the unknown and coarse painter of the Sforza Altarpiece altered the physiognomy of Beatrice compared to the refined original drawings of Ambrogio de Predis, hardening the features of the face to make it almost unrecognizable: "he preferred to take care of the accessories of the dress with infinite monotony, so that the duchess, more than a living person, appears a doll too adorned".

=== Miniatures ===
1. The most famous miniature, the work of Giovanni Pietro Birago, is contained in the donation diploma of 28 January 1494, now preserved at the British Library in London, with which her husband enfeffed her of numerous lands.
2. There was a certain similarity between the physiognomy of Beatrice and that "a bit impertinent" of the Laura of Antonio Grifo's Canzoniere Marciano. Ludovico and Beatrice are undoubtedly the couple who, in the Canzoniere queriniano illuminated by Grifo, at folio 119 r. acts as a guide to the others. It may have been depicted, again by Grifo, also in a letter cap illuminated at folio 182 v. of the incunabulum of the Divine Comedy preserved at the House of Dante in Rome.
3. Another of her miniatures can be found in the Arcimboldi Missal of the Chapter Library of the Duomo of Milan, in the scene of the ducal investiture of her husband.

More recently she has been honoured along with her court in works by painters such as Giambattista Gigola (1816–1820), Giuseppe Diotti (1823), Francesco Gonin (1845), Francesco Podesti (1846), Cherubino Cornienti (1840 and 1858), Eleanor Fortescue-Brickdale (1920), and individually in Domenico Mingione's Portrait of Beatrice d'Este (2021), which faithfully reproduces Leonardo da Vinci's charcoal drawing.

== Issue ==
By Ludovico, Beatrice had three sons:

- Ercole Massimiliano Sforza, (1493–1530), count of Pavia, duke of Milan 1513 – 1515;
- Francesco II Sforza, (1495–1535), Prince of Rossano and Count of Borrello 1497 – 1498, Count of Pavia and Duke of Milan 1521 – 1524, married in 1533 to Christina of Denmark (1522–1590), daughter of Christian II of Denmark.
- Stillbirth son (2 January 1497). Not having been baptized, could not be placed with his mother in the tomb. Ludovico, therefore, had him buried above the door of the cloister of Santa Maria delle Grazie with this Latin epitaph: "O unhappy childbirth! I lost my life before I was born, and more unhappy, by dying I took the life of my mother and the father deprived his wife. In so much adverse fate, this alone can be of comfort to me, that divine parents bore me, Ludovico and Beatrice dukes of Milan. 2 January 1497".

== See also ==
- Vincenzo Calmeta
- Triumphi (Vincenzo Calmeta)

== Bibliography ==
- Alberti de Mazzeri, Silvia (1986). Beatrice d'Este duchessa di Milano. Rusconi. ISBN 978-88-18-23015-4.
- Anonimo ferrarese (1928). Giuseppe Pardi (ed.). Diario ferrarese. Vol. fasc. 1, vol. 24. Zanichelli.
- Buzzi, Vittore; Buzzi, Claudio (2005). Le vie di Milano dizionario della toponomastica milanese. U. Hoepli.
- Cartwright, Julia Mary (1945). Beatrice d'Este, Duchessa di Milano. Milano: Edizioni Cenobio.
- Cartwright, Julia Mary (1903). Beatrice D'Este, Duchess of Milan, 1475–1497: A Study of the Renaissance. J. M. Dent.
- Casalis, Goffredo (1843). Dizionario geografico-storico-statistico-commerciale degli Stati del Re di Sardegna (etc.). G. Maspero libraio & Cassone e Marzorati tipografi.
- Castiglione, Baldassarre (1955). "Il Cortegiano". Classici. UTET.
- Calmeta, Vincenzo (2004). "Triumphi". Scelta di curiosità letterarie inedite o rare dal secolo XIII al XIX. Bologna: Rossella Guberti. Commissione per i testi di lingua.
- Crippa, Maria Antonietta; Zanzottera, Ferdinando (1999). Le porte di Milano. Istituto Gaetano Pini.
- Dina, Achille. Isabella d'Aragona Duchessa di Milano e di Bari.
- Giordano, Luisa (2008). "Beatrice d'Este (1475–1497)". Vol. 2. ETS. ISBN 978-88-467-2057-3.
- Giulini, Alessandro (1912). "Bianca Sanseverino Sforza". Archivio Storico Lombardo. Vol. 18. Milano: Libreria Bocca.
- Malaguzzi Valeri, Alessandro (1913). La corte di Lodovico il Moro: la vita privata e l'arte a Milano nella seconda metà del Quattrocento. Vol. 1. Milano: Hoepli.
- Malaguzzi Valeri, Alessandro (1917). La corte di Lodovico il Moro: gli artisti Lombardi. Vol. 2. Milano: Hoepli.
- Mazzi, Maria Serena (2004). Come rose d'inverno, le signore della corte estense nel '400. Nuovecarte. ISBN 978-88-87527-16-2.
- Melchiorri, Gerolamo (2014). Graziano Gruppioni (ed.). Donne illustri ferraresi dal Medioevo all'Unità. Ferrara: Graziano Gruppioni. ISBN 978-88-89248-18-8.
- Il mondo illustrato, giornale universale. G. Pomba. 1848.
- Muratori, Ludovico Antonio (1988). "Delle antichità estensi". Vol. 2. Cassa di Risparmio di Vignola. Arti Grafiche Tamari.
- Pirovano, Francesco (1830). Milano, nuova descrizione. Seconda edizione. Silvestri.
- Pizzagalli, Daniela (1999). La dama con l'ermellino, vita e passioni di Cecilia Gallerani nella Milano di Ludovico il Moro. Rizzoli. ISBN 978-88-17-86073-4.
- Pizzagalli, Daniela (2001). La signora del Rinascimento. Vita e splendori di Isabella d'Este alla corte di Mantova. Rizzoli. ISBN 978-88-17-86807-5.
- Zambotti, Bernardino. Giuseppe Pardi (ed.). Diario ferrarese dall'anno 1476 sino al 1504. Zanichelli.
