= Antonio Roque Gobbo =

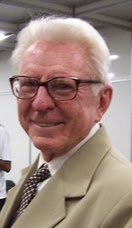
- Born: Antonio Roque Gobbo; 9 November 1935; São Sebastião do Paraíso, Minas Gerais, Brazil
- Known for: country short stories, fiction

Antonio Roque Gobbo (born 9 November 1935 in São Sebastião do Paraíso, Minas Gerais, Brazil) is a writer.

== Writing career ==
Gobbo began his writer career in his 60s when he began writing short stories. He created a project to publish 1,000 short stories, the "Milistórias" Project. Since then, he released seven books in the collection "Milistórias" and a novel, A Senhora das Coroas (Lady of the Crowns in English).

== Publications ==
- A Loucura do Cristal (The Madness of Cristal) - Milistórias Vol I (2001, Milistórias Project, Belo Horizonte, Minas Gerais, Brazil)
- A Babel da Torre (The Babel Tower) - Milistórias Vol II (2002, Milistórias Project, Belo Horizonte, Minas Gerais, Brazil, ISBN 85-903242-1-4)
- O Espião de Bagdá (The Baghdad Spy) - Milistórias Vol III (2003, Milistórias Project, Belo Horizonte, Minas Gerais, Brazil)
- Minha Doce Vampira (My Sweet Vampire) - Milistórias Vol IV (2004, Anome Livros, Belo Horizonte, Minas Gerais, Brazil)
- O Fantasma dos Mares (The Phantom of the Seas) - Milistórias Vol V (Out/2005, Proj. Literário Milistórias, Belo Horizonte, Minas Gerais, Brazil)
- Legado Nuclear (Nuclear Legacy) - Milistórias Vol VI (Out/2006, Proj. Literário Milistórias, Belo Horizonte, Minas Gerais, Brazil)
- Inimigos Não Mandam Flores (The enemies don't send flowers) - Milistórias Vol VII (2007, Ed. Argos & Milistórias Project, Belo Horizonte, Minas Gerais, Brazil)
- A Senhora das Coroas (The Lady of the Flower Crowns) (2010, Ed. Literato, Belo Horizonte, Minas Gerais, Brazil)

== Other publications ==
Gobbo also contributed to the book Contos dos Contos - Narrativas Inspiradas na Bíblia (The Tales of Tales - Narratives Inspired by the Bible) (2005, Mazza Edições, Belo Horizonte, Minas Gerais, Brazil), a book of ten short stories, all from different authors.

== Gibiteca Antonio Gobbo ==
Gobbo was an avid collector of comic books for much of his life, from childhood, around age 7, until in his 50s. His collection reached a peak or around 4,800 items, and so he decided to create the "Biblioteca Nacional de Histórias em Quadrinhos" (National Library of Comic Books), which existed between 1987 and 1992 in Belo Horizonte, Minas Gerais. In 1992, he decided to donate its entire collection to Belo Horizonte's public library. His collection was named as "Gibiteca Antonio Gobbo".

== Personal life ==
Gobbo is married to Enny Mumic Gobbo and the father of five children, Cecilia Gobbo, Denise Gobbo, Alexandre Gobbo, Fabiola Gobbo and Mauricio Gobbo. He currently lives in Belo Horizonte.
