= Cristoforo Solari =

Italian sculptor and architect (c. 1468 – 1524)

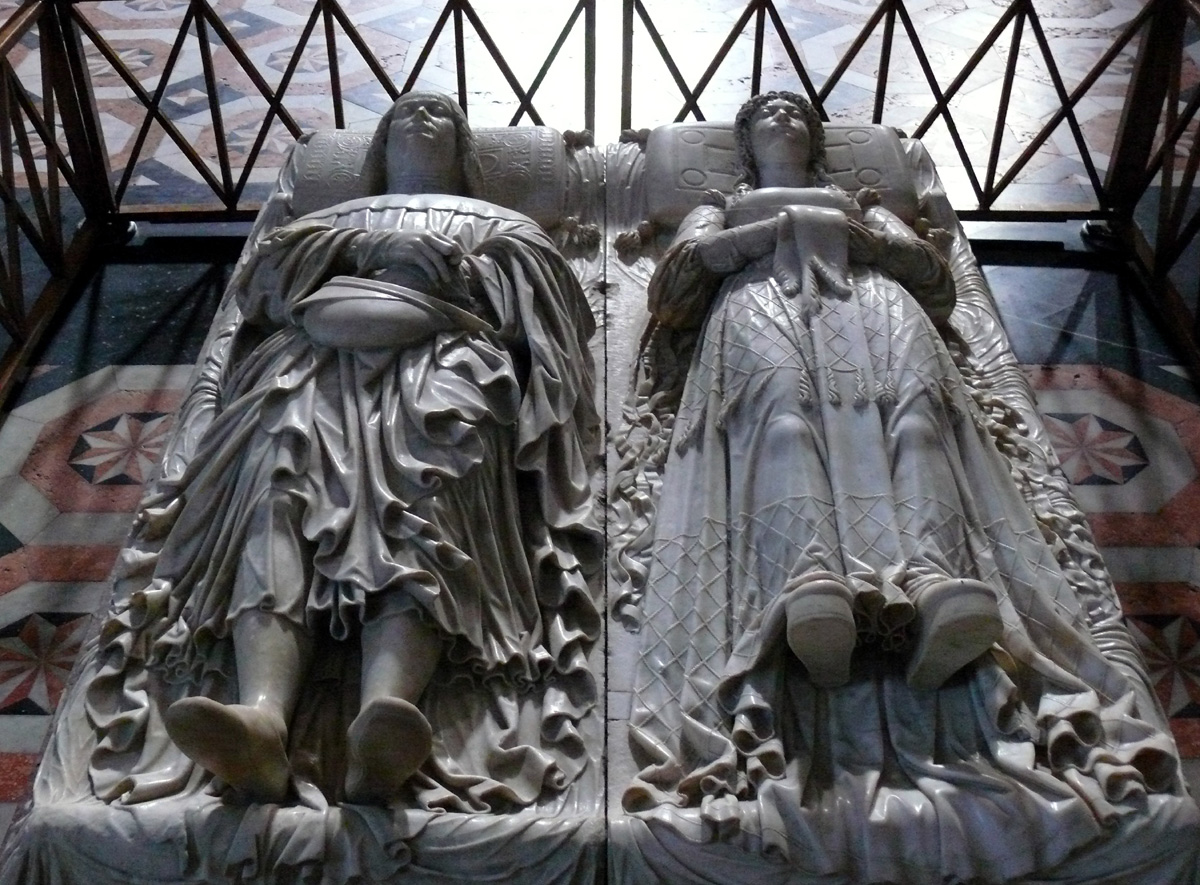
Tomb lid of Ludovico il Moro and Beatrice d'Este, Pavia.

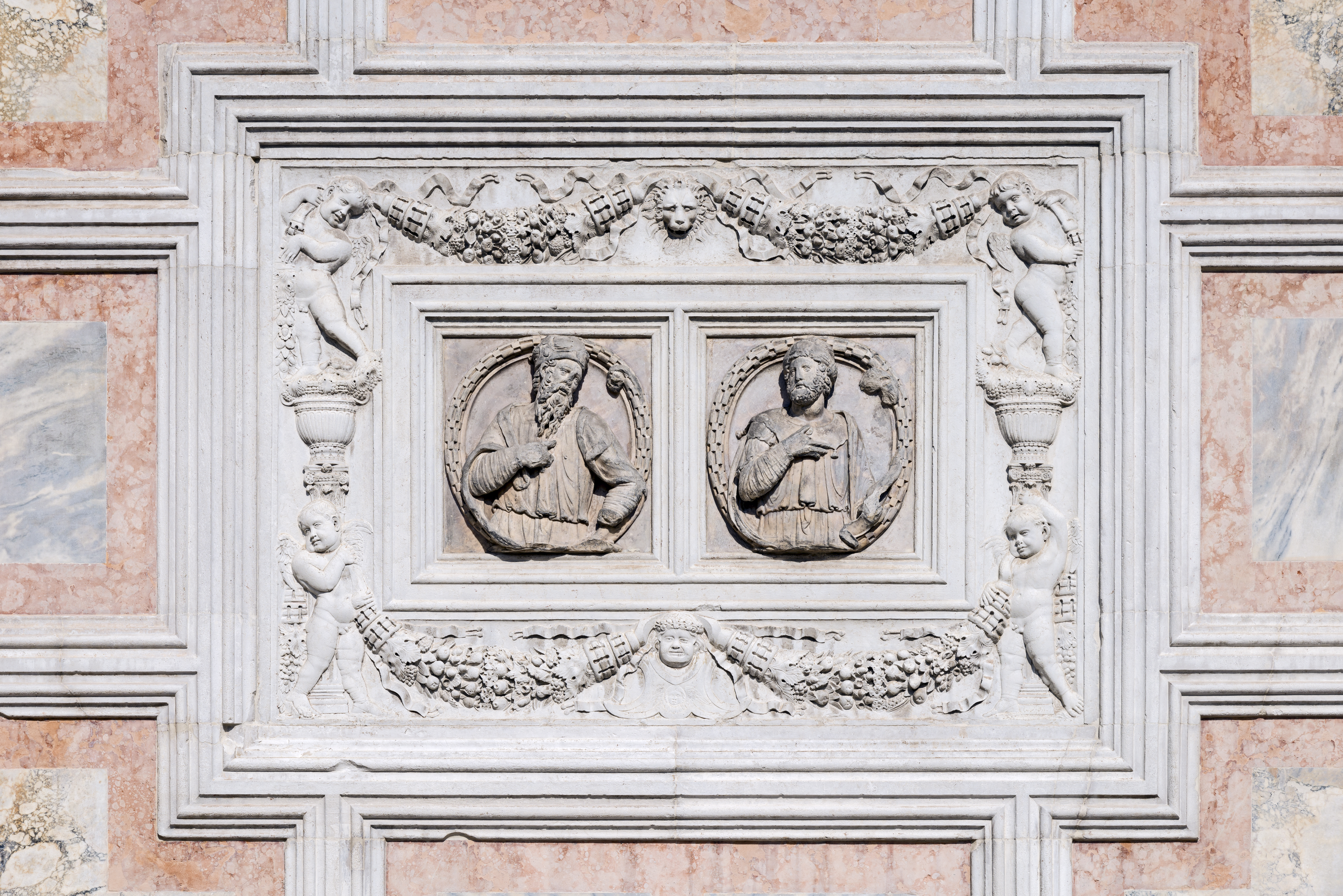
Church of San Zaccaria Venice – bas-relief on the facade

Cristoforo Solari (c. 1460 – 1527), also known as il Gobbo (lit. 'the hunchbacked'), was an Italian sculptor and architect. He was the brother of the painter Andrea Solari.

Among his works, one of the most famous is the cenotaph lid of the dukes Ludovico il Moro and Beatrice d'Este for the Certosa di Pavia, carved between 1497 and 1499.

For a while, people thought he had sculpted the Pietà, causing Michelangelo to break into the church and chisel his name on it.

Some of Solari's work can be found at the Metropolitan Museum of Art in New York, the Museum of Fine Arts in Boston, the Daniel Katz Gallery in London, the Victoria & Albert Museum in London, and multiple other locations across the world.
