= Taddeo d'Este =

Venetian mercenary

- Born: ca. 1390; Este
- Died: 21 June 1448; Mozzanica
- Occupation: Mercenary

Taddeo d'Este (ca. 1390 – 21 June 1448) was a condottiere, a freelance military leader, who was known for his defense of the Republic of Venice in 1439 against Milanese forces under Niccolò Piccinino. Unlike many other condottieri of the day, who often changed sides, he served Venice almost exclusively throughout his thirty-year military career. During most of this period Venice was constantly at war with one or more of the neighboring states in northern Italy.

== Early years ==
Taddeo d'Este was born around the last decade of the fourteenth century in Este, the second son of Obizzo II d'Este, of the younger branch of the family that ruled Ferrara. His mother belonged to the noble family of Collalto. Taddeo became a mercenary at an early age, fighting for Venice, and gave the republic his loyalty for the next thirty years during the wars in which the city struggled to gain territory in the Terraferma, on the mainland. However, he was never given independent command for any length of time.

== Friuli and Istria 1414–1422 ==
Taddeo d'Este was active in the struggle for territory between Venice and the Patriarch of Aquileia. In 1414 Taddeo led a squad of fifteen lances (cavalrymen) in a fight at Zadar against the armies of Sigismund of Luxembourg. The next year he was given permission to return to Este to look after family affairs, since his father had just died. When the truce with Sigismund broke down, in April 1417 he was sent back at the head of 50 lances. In September 1418 he was leading a force of 70 lances in the village of Brugnera, a defensive position along the Treviso-Udine line. In November 1419, with 100 horsemen, he was sent to defend Cividale del Friuli against Hungarian troops under Louis of Teck, the Patriarch of Aquileia. He organized the defense successfully, then managed to break out and defeat the Hungarians in open battle. By the end of the month he was able to raise the Venetian banner over the castles of Gorizia and Duino.

By June 1420 most of Friuli had been conquered and another truce had been arranged with Sigismund. Taddeo returned on leave to Venice and in September married Magdalene, daughter of Filippo Arcelli, governor general of the Friuli army. He was required to return to Friuli immediately after his marriage. In January 1421 he was dispatched to Istria. When Arcelli became ill and retired to Padua to regain his health, d'Este was appointed commander of the troops. After recovering, Arcelli returned to Istria and resumed command, but was wounded in battle and died in July 1421. Taddeo d'Este again took command. He damaged the castle of Sanvincenti to the east of Rovigno. He took the Pietrapelosa castle in Istria in August 1421 and during the next few months defeated the army of Aquileia; Istria became divided between the Republic of Venice and the Habsburg County of Pazin.

Although Taddeo d'Este was recognized as the most senior of the commanders after Arcelli's death, he was not officially the leader. By the autumn of 1421 the Venetian republic had imposed economy measures on the army, reducing troop levels to their lowest in a long time, with only 400 cavalry. However, in May 1422 an increase in forces was allowed.

== Milan, Aquileia, Bologna 1422–1437 ==
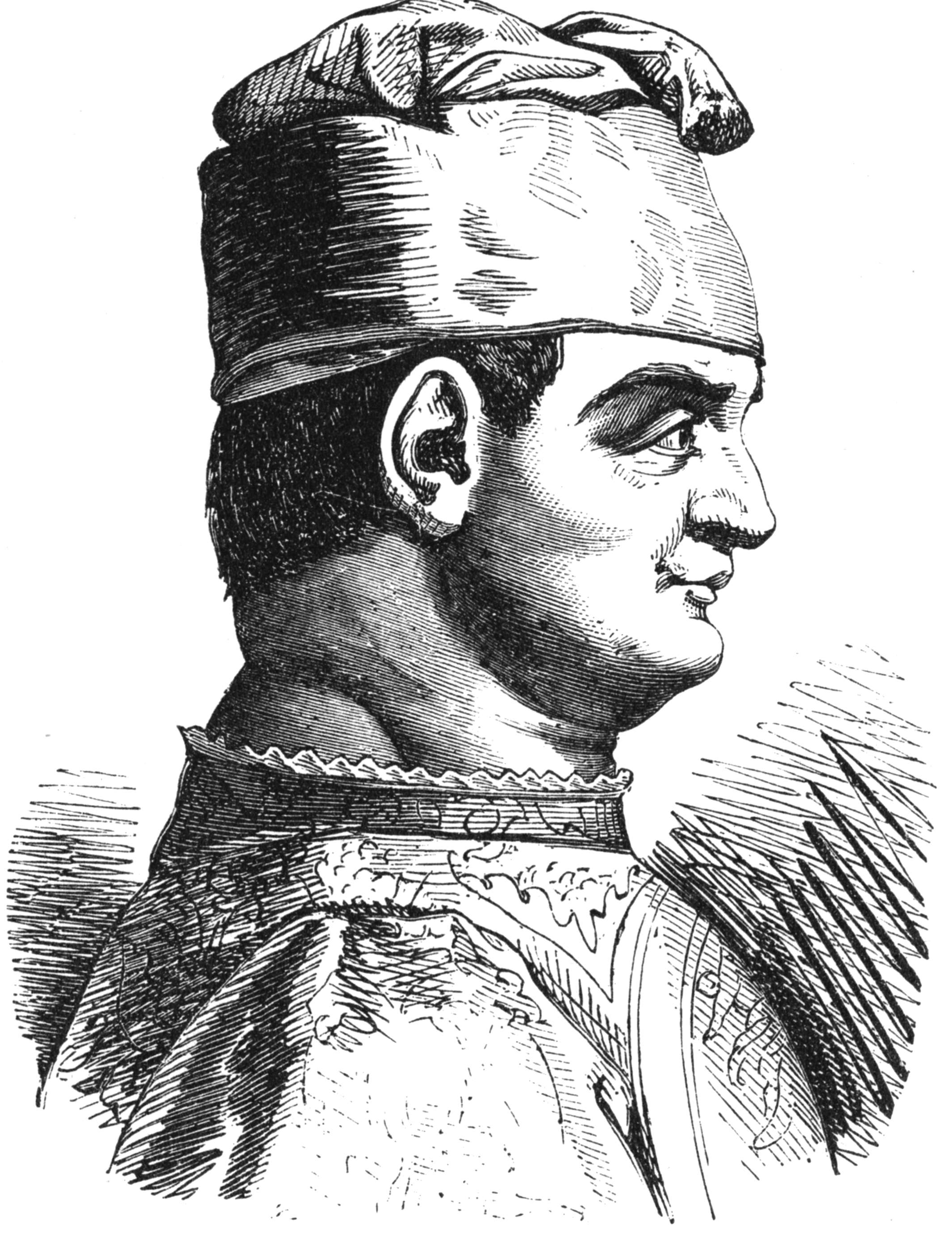
Filippo Maria Visconti, Duke of Milan (1412–1447)

By early 1422 the conquest of Istria was complete. Taddeo returned home, retaining some of his men but not engaging in warfare for several years. He used the time to reorganize his estates and to buy houses and land in the Este countryside and the city of Padua.

In March 1426 a new conflict broke out between Venice and Filippo Maria Visconti, Duke of Milan. Taddeo was asked to lead a company of 100 lances. He was one of the first to enter the fortress of Brescia when it was captured. When the peace of Ferrara in April 1428 brought temporary peace, for a while Taddeo fought in the service of the Pope, helping with the recapture of Bologna.

In 1431 Taddeo d'Este was again fighting for the republic against the Patriarch of Aquileia, who with the encouragement of Milan had raised a force of over 6,000 German and Hungarian troops with which to try to recover part of his former domain. Taddeo was sent to Friuli, where he engaged in defensive actions against superior forces until the main Venetian force arrived and decisively and permanently defeated the patriarch at Rosazzo.

In November 1432 Taddeo d'Este was defeated in Lombardy, captured and taken to Milan. He was released in April of the next year in exchange for a huge ransom after peace had been arranged between Venice and Milan. The Venetians confirmed Taddeo as leader of 200 cavalry and gave him command of the garrison of Orzi Nuovi in Lombardy.

In May 1434 his son Bertoldo was born, destined to follow in his father's footsteps as a soldier for Venice.

In August 1434 Taddeo d'Este was engaged in fighting in Romagna with the troops of Bologna, and was taken prisoner, being released after the intervention of the Marquess of Ferrara. In March 1435 he was given the task of foiling an attempt by Marsilio da Carrara to capture Padua. After he had succeeded, in April 1435 he was admitted to the ranks of the Venetian nobility, with his children and heirs, and admitted to the Great Council of Venice. The Venetians awarded him a palace in their city of Padua.

== Final decade 1438–1448 ==
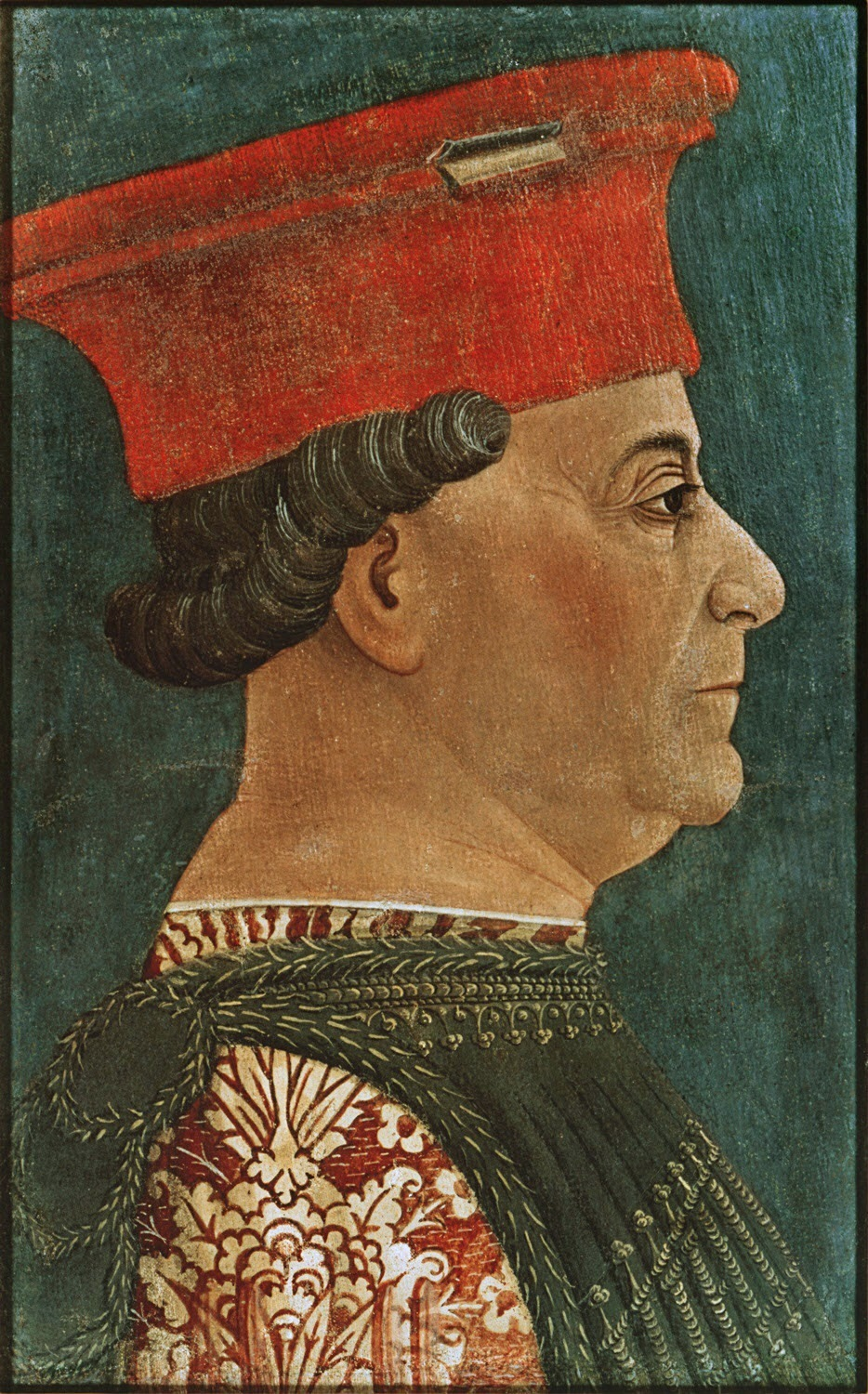
Francesco Sforza (1401–1466)

In 1438 war with Milan broke out again. Taddeo d'Este and Francesco Barbero conducted a long and gallant defense of Brescia against Milanese troops under Piccinino. Gattamelata broke out, making a skilled escape via mountain routes, leaving Taddeo with just 1,000 men to conduct the defense. The siege of Brescia lasted until December 1438, when Gattamelata made a feint that drew Piccinino away. The fighting continued, and in September 1439 d'Este was forced to surrender to greatly superior forces and was imprisoned in Peschiera.

In 1441 d'Este was back in Venice attending the celebrations of the marriage of Jacopo, son of Doge Francesco Foscari. In the Piazza San Marco his company competed for lavish prizes in lengthy tournaments with the companies of the condottieri Francesco Sforza and Gattamelata.

His first wife having died, he married again in 1442 to Margherita Pio. In the 1440s Leonello and Taddeo d'Este were challenged by the canons of S. Giacomo, Monselice, who claimed they had been levying tithes in the parish of S. Maria, Solesino, by force for several years.

In June 1443 Taddeo d'Este was commanded to take his company of 800 cavalry to Ravenna, where he placed himself under the command of Francesco Sforza, then serving as captain general of the anti-Papal league. In June 1445, acting as commander of the army but without the formal title, Taddeo was sent to Bologna with 1,000 cavalry and 400 infantry. The next year he managed to arrange for a part of the Bolognese forces to transfer to Venice, and after some further fighting was able to bring the war with Bologna to a close. He then had to return to Lombardy where a renewed struggle with Milan had begun.

In 1447 d'Este seized and held Piacenza for Venice. He defended the town with 2,000 lances, 2,000 infantry and 6,000 armed citizens. The town was besieged by Milanese forces under Francesco Sforza. In addition to Sforza's men the Milanese army had 10,000 soldiers and the condottieri under leaders such as Francesco Piccinino, Guidaccio Manfredi, Luigi dal Verme and others had 15,000 cavalry and infantry. The walls were broken down by cannon fire, and flooding of the river Po meant that boats could approach the city walls. After fierce fighting, Taddeo d'Este, Alberto Scotto and the Venetian governor Gherardo Dandolo were forced to surrender and were taken captive. The town was thrown open to pillage and the inhabitants were treated with great cruelty. Due to his personal friendship with Sforza, d'Este was soon released.

Taddeo d'Este died suddenly while attempting to take Mozzanica on 21 June 1448. His state funeral was held in Brescia. His body was returned to Este, where it was buried in the family tomb in the church of S. Francesco. His male line died out in 1463.
