= Battle of Delebio =

1432 battle between Milan and Venice

Coordinates: 46.1333°N 9.4667°E

- Part of Wars in Lombardy
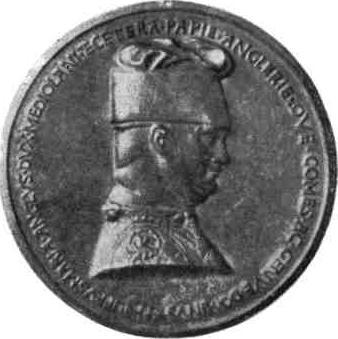
- Filippo Maria Visconti, Duke of Milan
Date	18 and 19 November 1432
Location	Delebio, Valtellina, Lombardy
Result	Ducal Milanese victory

Belligerents
Duchy of Milan	Republic of Venice

Commanders and leaders
Niccolò Piccinino; Pietro Brunoro; Stefano Quadrio	Giorgio Corner; Cesare Martinengo; Taddeo d'Este

Strength
400 Milanese Knights; Strengenthed by the Ghibelline faction loyal to the Duke	1 Venetian Column

Casualties and losses
Unknown	c. 5,000 Killed; 2,700 Captured

The Battle of Delebio took place during the Wars in Lombardy. It occurred on 18 and 19 November 1432, near Delebio, in the Valtellina. It was an aftermath of the occupation of Brescia and the Valle Camonica by the armies of the Republic of Venice, led by Francesco Bussone, Count of Carmagnola.

== Prelude ==
The Venetian troops under Giorgio Corner had invaded the Valtellina in 1431, in order to secure the Republic's northern borders and favour their trade towards Germany. On 18 November 1432 the army of Filippo Maria Visconti, duke of Milan, with more than 400 horse and an unspecified infantry under the condottiero Niccolò Piccinino, marched alongside the Lake Como to defy the Venetians. Among the commanders of the Venetian troops was Bartolomeo Colleoni, who later became one of the most famous condottieri.

== Battle ==
The first clash occurred that same day, when Venetians lost c. 300 infantry to push back a surprise attack on their camp. The following morning the camp was attacked by Piccinino from the West and by the Ghibellines of Valtellina, under Stefano Quadrio, from the East. The Venetians were crushed, most of their commanders being imprisoned. The Venetian losses amounted to 1,800 cavalry and 3,500 infantry, with c. 2,700 prisoners (5,000 casualties and 7,000 prisoners according to other sources).

== See also ==
- Wars in Lombardy
