= Galeas per montes =

Transportation of several Venetian ships from the Adriatic to Lake Garda

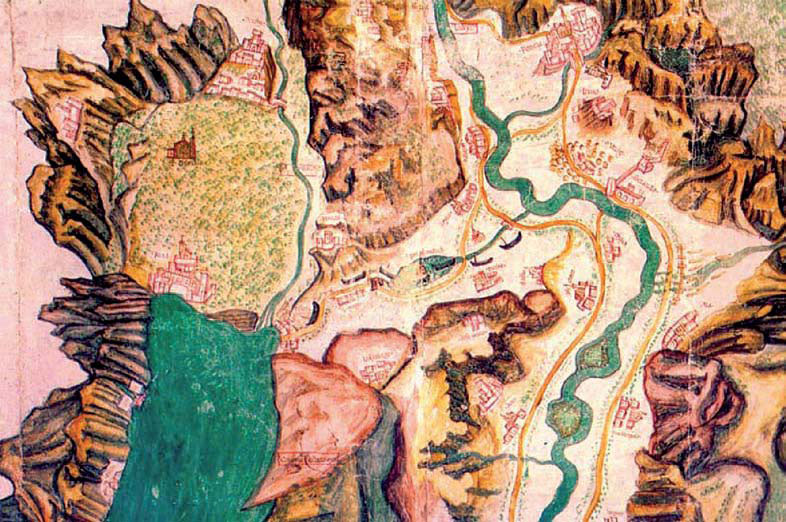
Map of the route taken between Rovereto and Torbole

Galeas per montes (galleys across mountains) is the name given to a feat of military engineering made between December 1438 and April 1439 by the Republic of Venice, when several Venetian ships, including galleys and frigates were transported from the Adriatic Sea to Lake Garda. The operation required towing the ships upstream on the river Adige until Rovereto, then transporting the fleet by land to Torbole, on the Northern shores of the lake. The second leg of the journey was the most remarkable achievement, requiring a land journey 20 km through the Loppio Lake and the narrow Passo San Giovanni.

== Context ==
The Republic of Venice was at the time a power in the Mediterranean and, in the 15th century, it began an expansion phase towards the mainland of the current Lombardia and Veneto regions both through military conquest (e.g. Padua) or spontaneous "dedication", as in the case of Vicenza. The city of Brescia, located West of Lake Garda, allied with the Republic of Venice to escape the Duchy of Milan on November 20, 1426.

In 1438, the Duke of Milan Filippo Maria Visconti waged war against the Republic of Venice and, through a series of lucky victories, took control of Lombard lands up to the southern shores of Lake Garda. At the same time, the city of Brescia was under siege by the mercenary condottiero Niccolò Piccinino, on the Duke of Milan's payroll, and called on the Venetian Senate for assistance.

Piccinino took control of the entire Southern sector of the lake, so the Venetian warlord Gattamelata (Erasmo da Narni) could only access the lake from its Northern shores, namely Torbole or Riva. The Milanese army was also fortified in the castles of Peschiera del Garda and Desenzano, making a head-on clash too expensive. To avoid this problem, the Republic of Venice decided to prepare a military plan that would allow its troops (and navy) to surprise the Visconti army entering the lake from its Northern shore.

On December 1, 1438, after a very long session, the Republic's Minor Council approved a plan formulated by Blasio de Arboribus, Niccolò Carcavilla, and Niccolò Sorbolo that would become the galeas per montes.

== The plan ==
The plan foresaw moving a fleet of warships by dragging it upstream the Adige river, then beaching it, and dragging it on wooden rollers along the Loppio valley to the Northern shores of Lake Garda, near Torbole. From there, the Venetian fleet would have unleashed a surprise attack toward the Milanese army, that was anchored in Desenzano, cutting supplies to the Visconti militia guarding Peschiera del Garda, and gaining a foothold to free Brescia and potentially threaten Milan.

The fleet, that included 25 large ships, 6 galleys and 2 frigates, set sail in January 1439 from Venice entering the mouths of the Adige river near Sottomarina. The fleet went upstream until Verona where, since the river was drier than usual, the Venetians had to fit the ships with devices to increase their buoyancy in order to reduce their draught. The fleet was then dragged further upstream until the village of Marco (Rovereto), where it was beached.

The Venetians designed and built special devices for the operations, and hired hundreds of workers including diggers, carpenters, sailors, and local craftsmen. The workers flattened the road that would be used by the fleet, and used around 2000 oxen divided in groups, since the largest ships could require more than 200 oxen to be dragged. In order to facilitate the passing of the fleet, the workers leveled natural and man-made obstacles, and built several bridges and infrastructural aids. The main road for the ships was built by laying down wooden planks, so that the massively heavy ships could be slid over the planks using wooden rollers.

The fleet's passage was made easier by having ships sail through the Lago di Loppio, reducing the length of the land passage. After the lake, the fleet was once again beached, and dragged along the steep and narrow slope from Passo San Giovanni to Torbole. As the ships would gather velocity during the downhill segment (potentially crashing against rocks), they were slowed down by tying their masts to large boulders using winches and thick ropes. To further slow down the ships' descent, Venetians unfurled the ships' sails, and made use of a local strong wind, the so-called Ora del Garda.

The complex operation was completed in only 15 days, but cost the staggeringly high amount of 16,000 Ducats. It was one of the most remarkable feats of military engineering at the time, becoming famous throughout Europe.

== Gallery ==
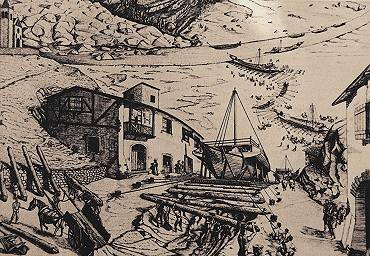
Along the route from the Adige river to the Loppio lake

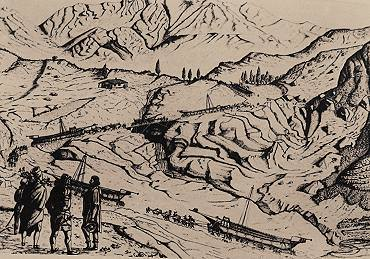
The ascent of ships

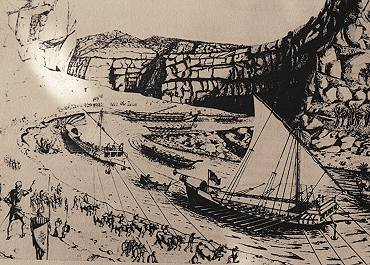
The passage through the Adige to Ceraino

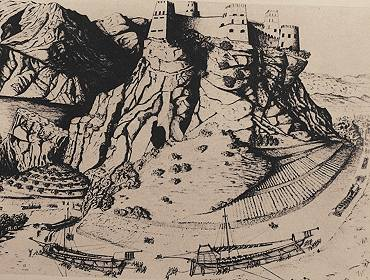
The dangerous descent from the San Giovanni Pass to Torbole

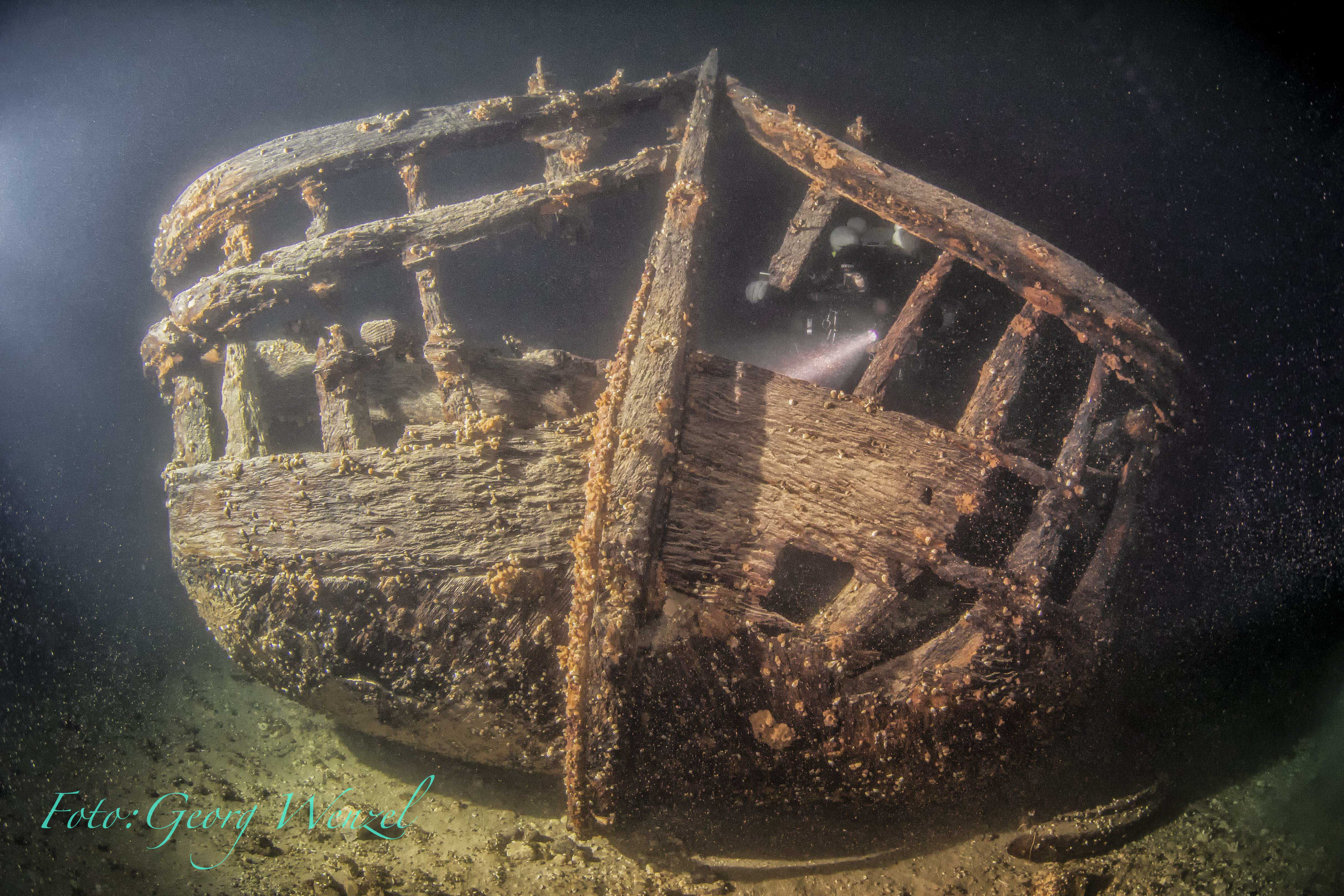

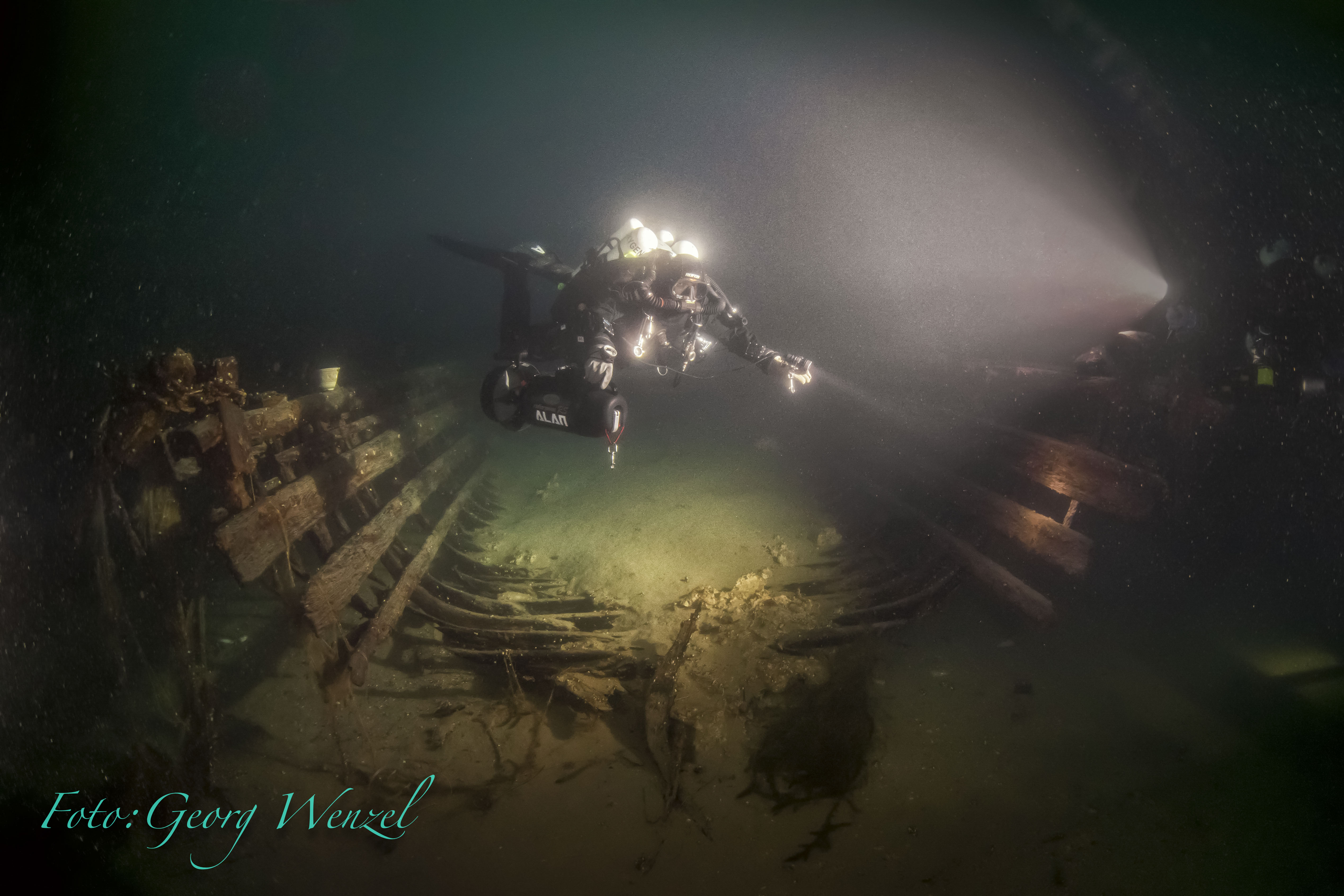

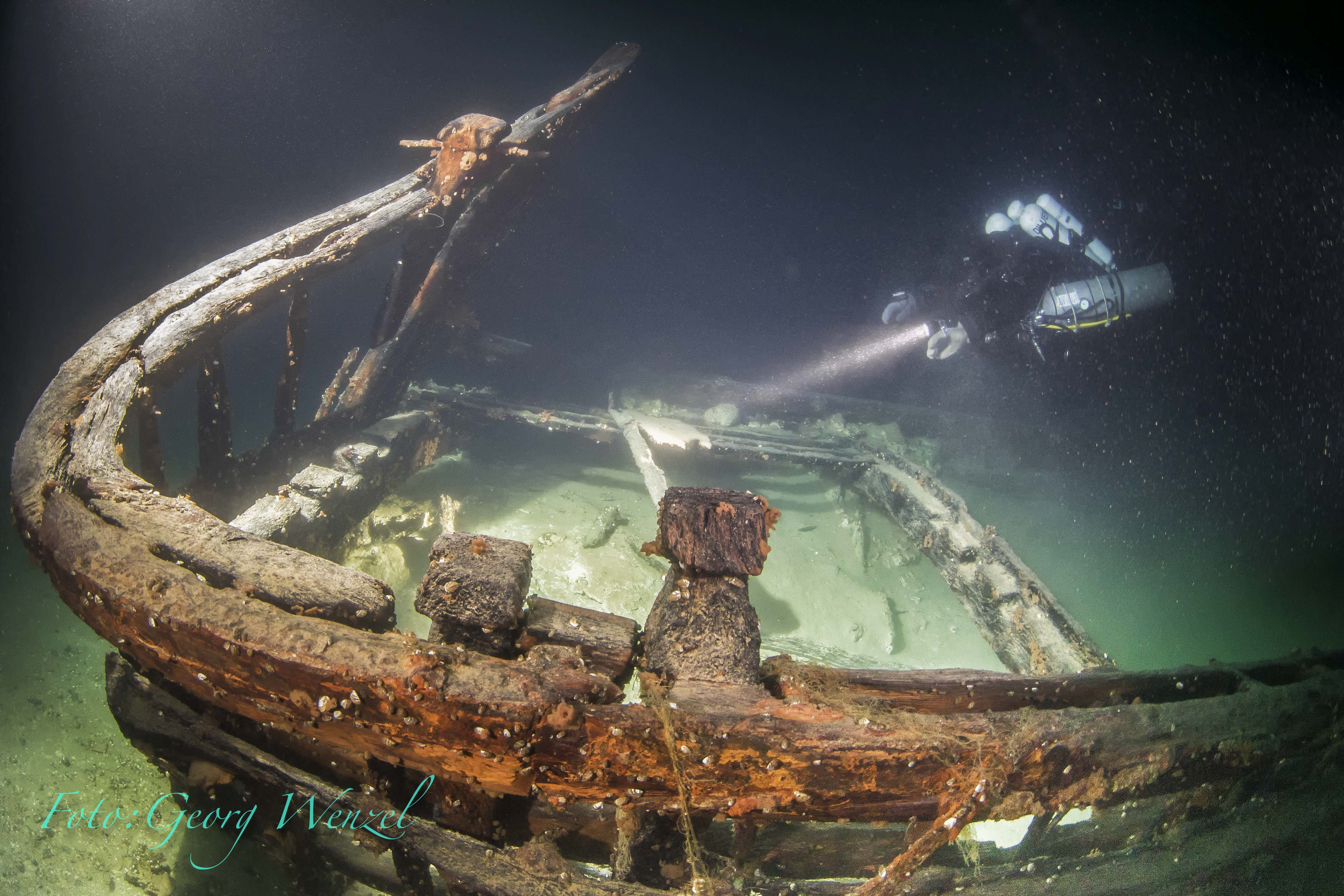

== Consequences ==
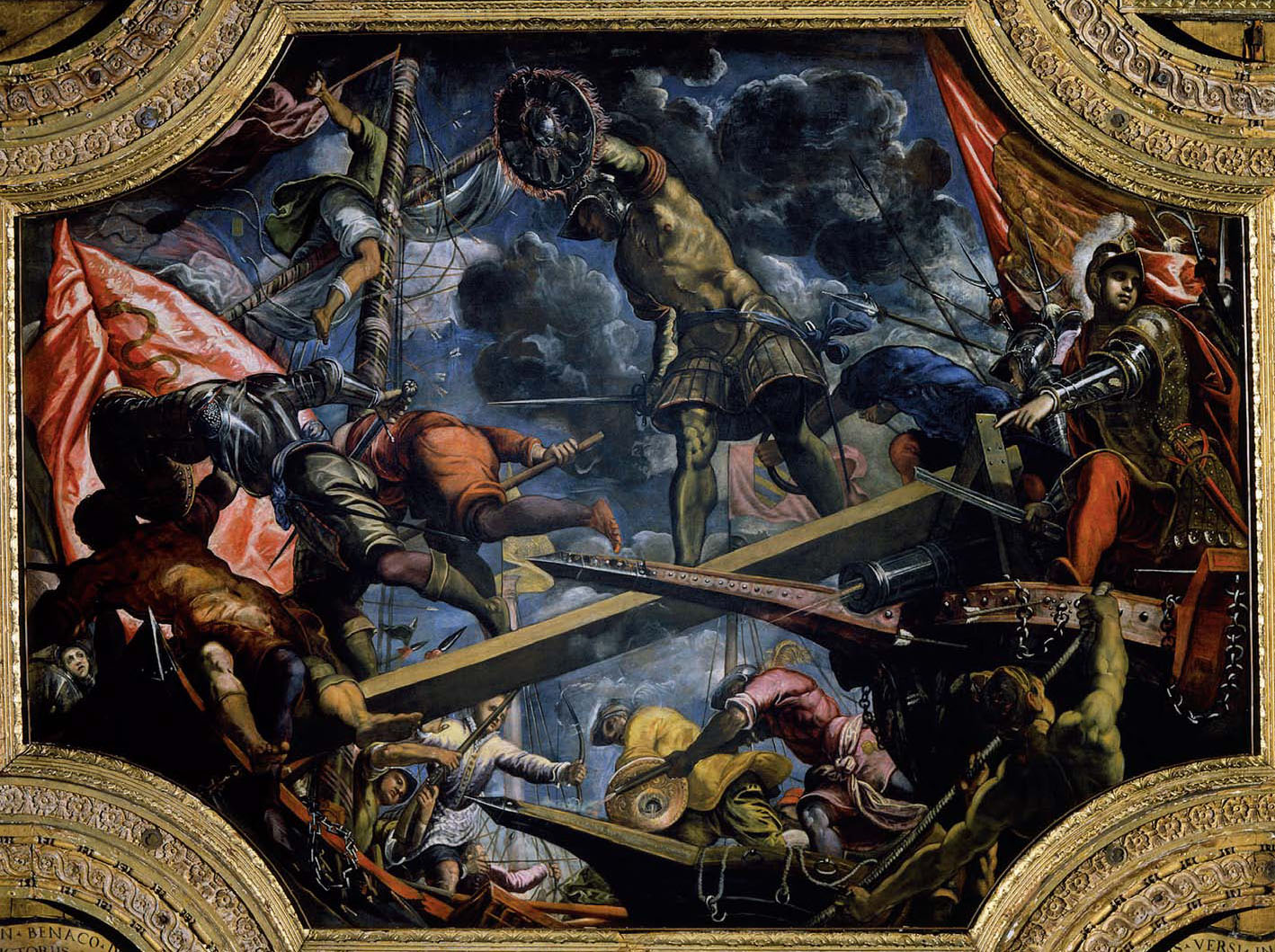
The painting by Tintoretto on the ceiling of the Hall of the Great Council which depicts the naval battle on Lake Garda

The fleet's presence on the lake allowed the Venetians to resupply Brescia, though these operations were soon noticed and contested by the Milanese navy. The two navies faced each other in two battles on April 12 and September 26, 1439, both seeing the defeat of the Venetians.

The Venetians finally managed to re-capture Lake Garda and Brescia only in 1440. An instrumental step in this victory was the naval battle in April 1440, where the Venetian fleet inflicted a major defeat to the Milanese navy on the waters off the Ponale pass.

A painting by Tintoretto in the Doge's Palace's Sala del Maggior Consiglio celebrates this victory.

== Notes ==
Unica viache ancor rimanesse ad approvvigionare Brescia era quella del lago di Garda, poiché essendo la costa orientale di esso formata dal Veronese, imbarcati colà i viveri, facilmente si potevano condurre a Brescia, e se il Piccinino fosse accorso a vietarlo avrebbe facilmente lasciata libera o poco munita la strada da Brescia a Verona. Ma nel lago non avevano i Veneziani alcun naviglio, mentre il nemico teneva un'armetta a Peschiera, e altri posti fortificati all'intorno.

In tanta difficoltà la Repubblica aveva accolto fino dal dicembre 1438 il temerario progetto di un Blasio de Arboribus (o Nicolò Carcavilla o Caravilla) e Nicolò Sorbolo di far passare pei monti una flottiglia dall'Adige nel lago. Componevasi di venticinque barche e sei galere, le quali dalla foce dell' Adige furono fatte salire fino quasi a Roveredo, ma di là erano ancora da dodici a quindici miglia per giungere a Torbole per terreno erto ed alpestre. In mezzo a quei monti e alle falde della catena del monte Baldo trovasi il lago di s. Andrea, nel quale appunto volevasi far entrare la flottiglia.

A quest'uopo furono radunati fino a duemila buoi, abbisognandone ben cento venti paia per ogni galera; gran numero di guastatori, operai, ingegneri sgombravano i borri, costruivano ponti, spianavano la strada, e così, dopo indicibili sforzi e fatiche, poté giungere l'armetta nel lago di s. Andrea. Restava a superare il monte Baldo, e l'umana industria e il ferreo volere anco a questo pervennero e con istrano spettacolo i navigli trovaronsi alfine sulla vetta del monte.

Di colà bisognava gettarli nel lago, operazione non meno difficile pei pericoli della discesa; in quel ripido pendìo legavansi le barche agli alberi e ai macigni, col mezzo di argani allentavansi a poco a poco le funi, e i navigli si calavano da quegli orridi precipizii. Così dopo quindici giorni di viaggio per terra, l'armetta giunse senz'alcun sinistro a Torbole, donde fu lanciata in acqua e munita.

Fu impresa maravigliosa che costò alla Repubblica ben quindici mila ducati, ma sciaguratamente presso che inutile per lo scopo di vettovagliare Brescia, poiché accorso il Piccinino col. suo navilio, poco sollievo poterono avere i Bresciani e il comandante veneziano Pietro Zeno dovette ritirarsi a Torbole e mettersi in salvo dietro a forte steccato.

— Eugenio Musatti, Storia di Venezia, 1880

== Bibliography ==
- Paolo Renier Testimonianze sul trasporto delle navi da Venezia al Garda eseguito dai veneziani nel 1439, Venezia 1967
- Paolo D. Malvinni La magnifica intrapresa. Galeas per montes conducendo, Curcu & Genovese, Trento 2010 ISBN 978-8896737170
- Samuel Romanin Storia documentata di Venezia – Tomo 4, 1853–1861.
- David Sanderson Chambers The Imperial Age of Venice 1380–1580 – (History of European Civilization Library), Harcourt Brace Jovanovich, 1970
- Clemente Cavalcabo Idea della storia e delle cossuetudini antiche della valle Lagarina ed...del Roveretano, 1776
- Eugenio Musatti, Storia di Venezia, 1880, tomo I, p. 270 e seg.
- Fabio Romanoni La guerra d’acqua dolce. Navi e conflitti medievali nell’Italia settentrionale, Clueb, Bologna 2023 ISBN 978-88-31365-53-6
