= Battle of Maclodio =

1427 battle between Venice and Milan

Coordinates: 45.4833°N 10.0500°E

- Part of the Wars in Lombardy
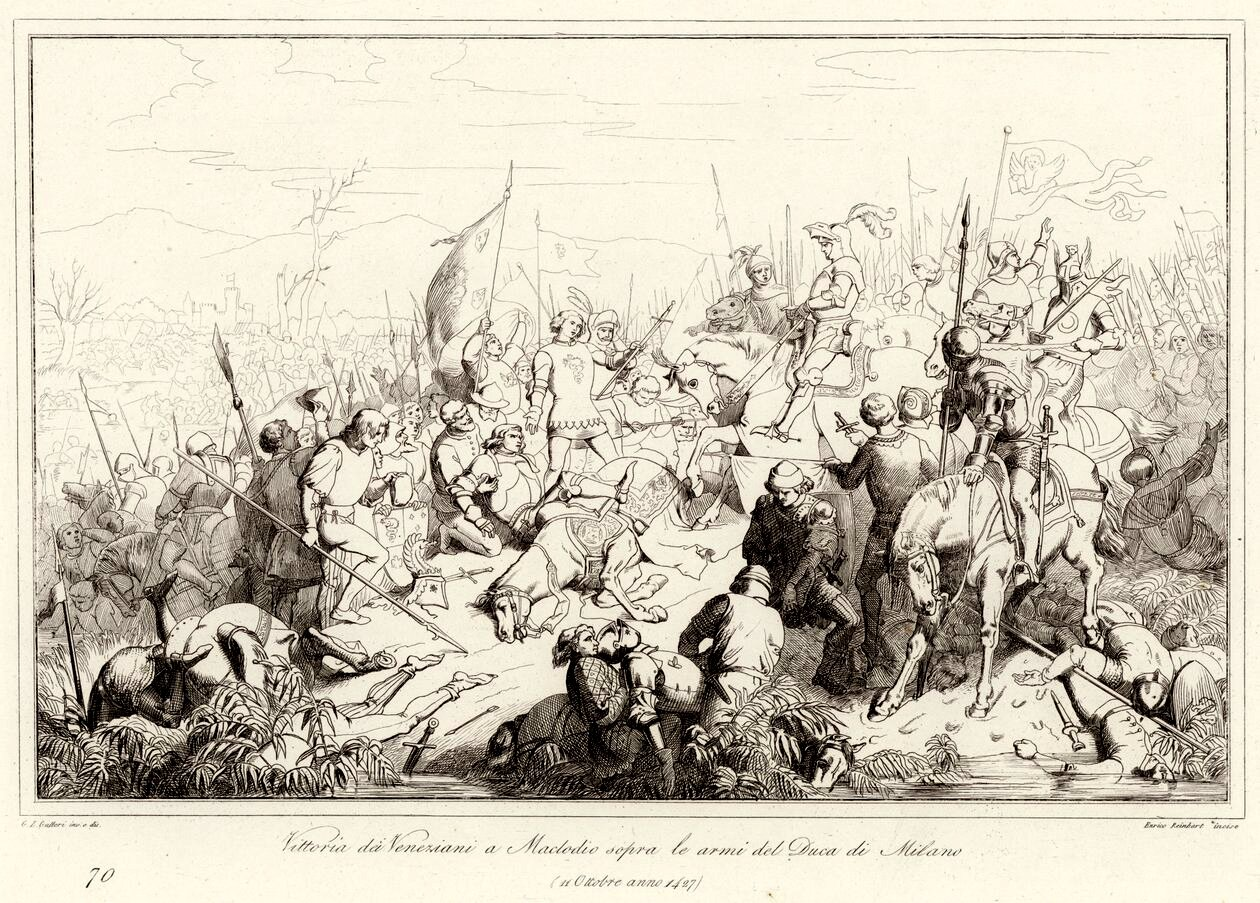
- Depiction of the battle, by Giuseppe Lorenzo Gatteri
Date	11 October 1427
Location	Maclodio
Result	Venetian victory

Belligerents
Republic of Venice Duchy of Mantua	Duchy of Milan

Commanders and leaders
Francesco Bussone da Carmagnola; Gianfrancis Gonzaga	Carlo Malatesta

Casualties and losses
Unknown	8,000 Milanese taken prisoner including Malatesta

The Battle of Maclodio was fought on 11 October 1427, resulting in a victory for the Venetians under Carmagnola over the Milanese under Carlo I Malatesta. The battle was fought at Maclodio (or Macalo), a small town near the River Oglio, fifteen kilometres (nine miles) south-west of Brescia. This battle, fought during the second campaign, was the only decisive victory for Venice in the Wars in Lombardy. This battle forced the Milanese into a treaty, conceding Brescia in 1428, though fighting of the wars in Lombardy was to resume later, continuing until the Treaty of Lodi in 1454.

The war began with a pact between Venice and Florence to oppose Filippo Maria Visconti, Duke of Milan, and his territorial ambitions. The Venetian commander for the battle, Carmagnola, had recently been under the employ of Milan but defected to Venice when Filippo Maria gave him governorship of Genoa rather than further military duty in an attempt to lessen his power. The doge of Venice, Francesco Foscari, was seriously considering helping Florence in their conflict against Milan, and Carmagnola spurred this on, persuading the doge to name him general in a new war against Milan.

Carmagnola quickly took Brescia for Venice, then made sure he campaigned very slowly, doing very little for a long time, forcing Venice to pay incredible amounts in upkeep for the almost useless army. Eventually, the public was starting to catch on to this, so Carmagnola decided he needed another big victory to keep in command. He finally moved into enemy territory and met the army of Filippo Maria, under Carlo Malatesta, at Maclodio.

The town itself was virtually destroyed in the battle, and the result was a decisive victory for Venice. Carmagnola was heavily praised and rewarded, being given a palace at San Stae that used to be the property of the Malatesta family, a fief in Bresciano, and a letter of appreciation from the doge. Public opinion of Carmagnola quickly soured again, however, as he released all 8,000 prisoners captured and decided not to advance on the defenceless Cremona. He then retired his army for the winter against Venetian wishes.

A short truce was offered by Milan, eventually granted by Venice on 19 April 1428, on the condition that Milan cede Bergamo and the surrounding area to them. This was the largest permanent land holdings that Venice would have for the rest of its history. The Wars in Lombardy resumed two years later.
