= Siege of Brescia =

Siege of Brescia can refer to:

- Siege of Brescia (1238)
- Siege of Brescia (1438–1440)
- Sack of Brescia (1512)
- Capture of Brescia (1799)
