= Wars in Lombardy =

Wars in Northern Italy in the first half of the 15th century

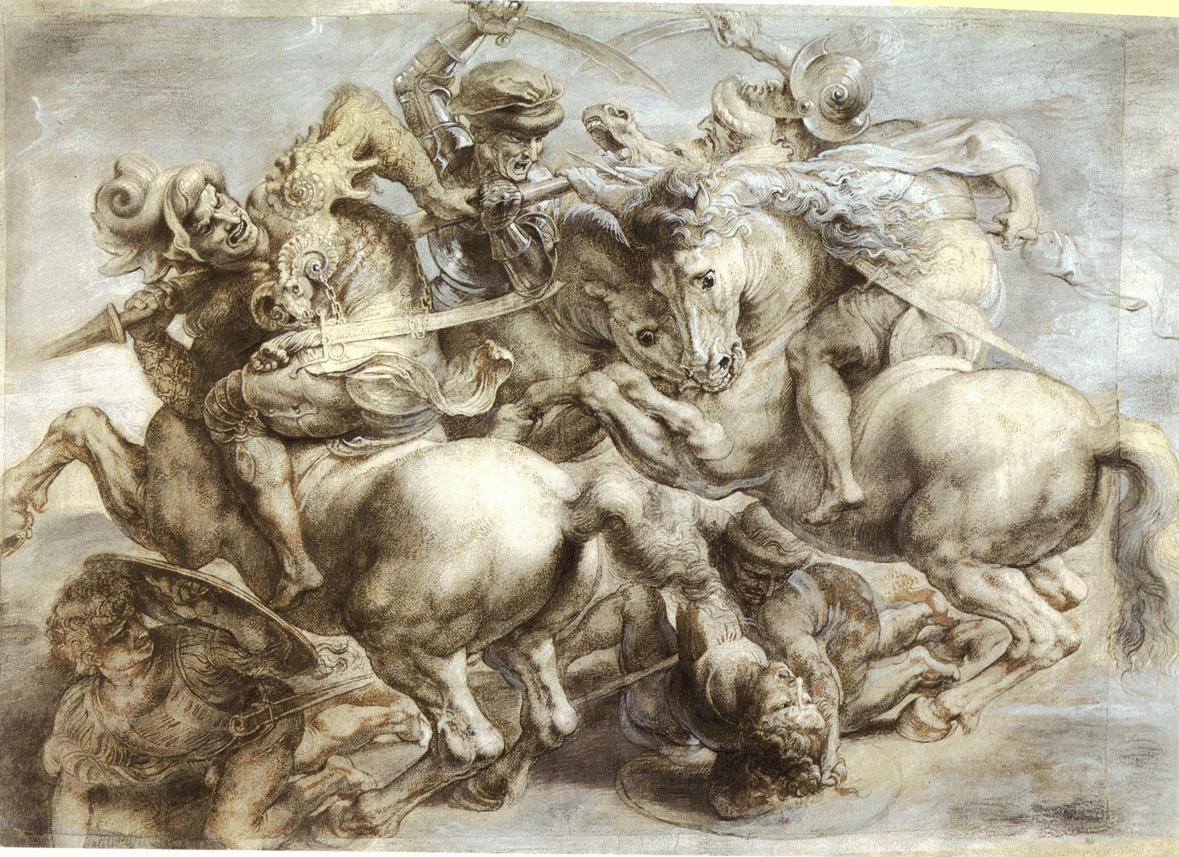
- Battle of Anghiari
Date	1423–1454 (31 years)
Location	Lombardy
Result	Treaty of Lodi, compromise treaty leading to a balance of power and a period of stability

Belligerents
Venetian Republic; Florentine Republic (until 1450); Kingdom of Naples; Duchy of Savoy; March of Montferrat	Duchy of Milan; Republic of Genoa; Marquisate of Mantua; Republic of Lucca; Republic of Siena; Florentine Republic (from 1450); Kingdom of France (from 1452)

Commanders and leaders
Francesco Foscari; Francesco Bussone; Carlo I Malatesta; Taddeo d'Este; Niccolò Fortebraccio; Jacopo Piccinino	Filippo Maria Visconti; Francesco Sforza; Cosimo de' Medici; Niccolò Piccinino; Niccolò Fortebraccio; René of Anjou

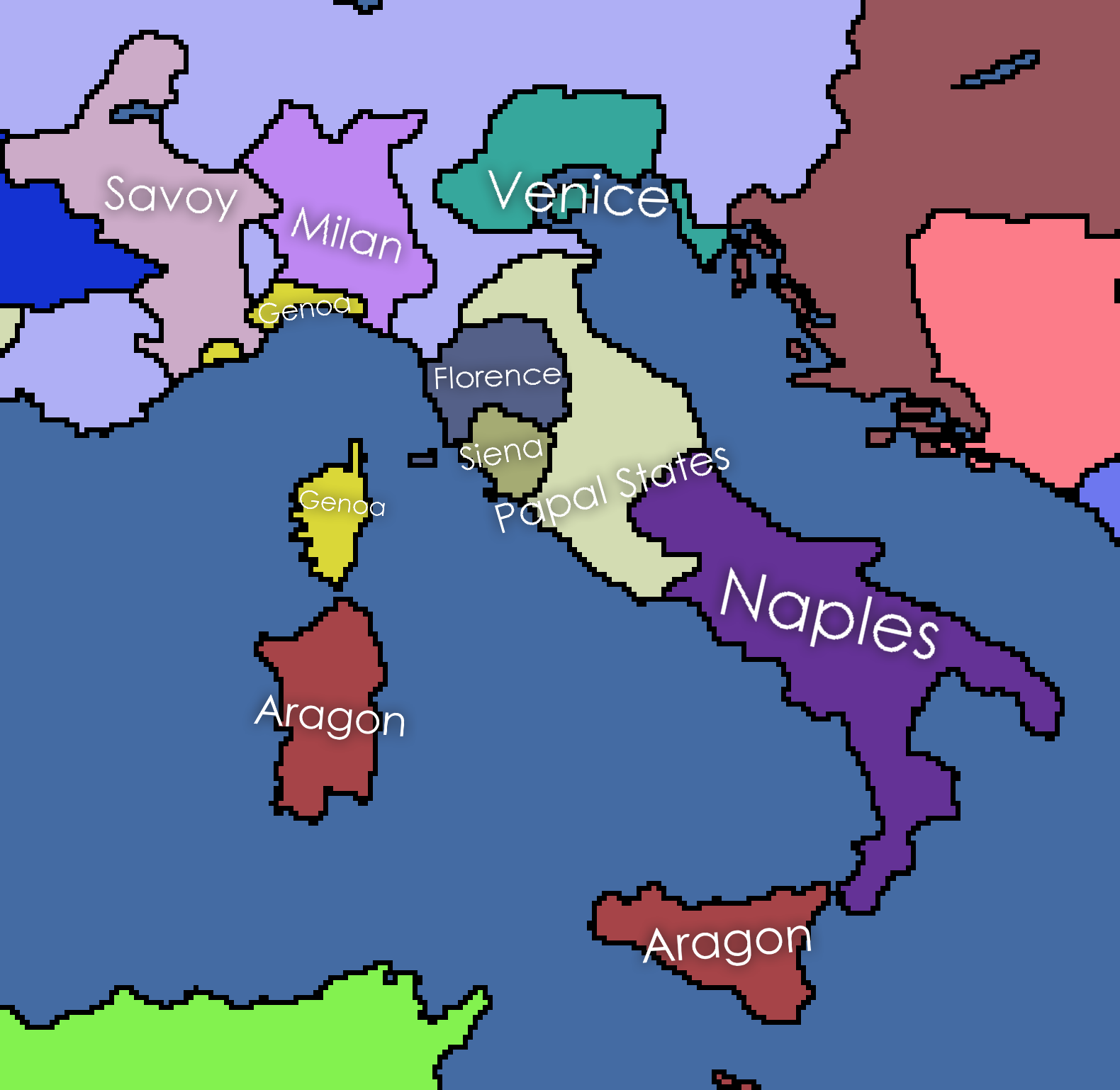
Italian peninsula before Wars in Lombardy (1422)

The Wars in Lombardy were a series of conflicts between the Republic of Venice and the Duchy of Milan and their respective allies, fought in four campaigns in a struggle for hegemony in Northern Italy that ravaged the economy of Lombardy. They lasted from 1423 until the signing of the Treaty of Lodi in 1454. During their course, the political structure of Italy was transformed: out of a competitive congeries of communes and city-states emerged the five major Italian territorial powers that would make up the map of Italy for the remainder of the 15th century and the beginning of the Italian Wars at the turn of the 16th century. They were Venice, Milan, Florence, the Papal States and Naples. Important cultural centers of Tuscany and Northern Italy—Siena, Pisa, Urbino, Mantua, Ferrara—became politically marginalized.

The wars, which were both a result and cause of Venetian involvement in the power politics of mainland Italy, (Note: Venice subdued Verona in 1402, Padua in 1405, and the rest of eastern Lombardy, the Venetian terra ferma ("mainland"), the following year. Previously Venice had been strictly a maritime power: her battles with the Republic of Genoa, culminating in the battle of Chioggia, were all fought at sea.) found Venetian territory extended to the banks of the Adda and involved the rest of Italy in shifting alliances but only minor skirmishing. The shifting counterweight in the balance was the allegiance of Florence, at first allied with Venice against encroachments by Visconti Milan, then switching to ally with Francesco Sforza against the increasing territorial threat of Venice. The Peace of Lodi, concluded in 1454, brought forty years of comparative peace to Northern Italy, (Note: See however the brief War of Ferrara (1482–1484) that was settled by the Peace of Bagnolo.) as Venetian conflicts focused elsewhere. (Note: The extension of Ottoman power into the Balkans and in the Aegean had involved Venice in intermittent warfare since 1415.)

After the Treaty of Lodi, there was a balance of power resulting in a period of stability lasting for 40 years. During this time, there was a mutual pledge of non-aggression between the five Italian powers, sometimes known as the Italic League. Even though there was frequent tension between Milan and Naples, the peace held remarkably well until the outbreak of the Italian Wars in 1494, as Milan called upon the king of France to press its claim on the kingdom of Naples.

== First campaign ==
The first of four campaigns against the territorial ambitions of Filippo Maria Visconti, duke of Milan, was connected to the death of the lord of Forlì, Giorgio Ordelaffi. He had named Visconti the trustee of his nine-year-old heir, Teobaldo II. The latter's mother, Lucrezia degli Alidosi, daughter of the lord of Imola, did not agree and assumed the regency for herself. The Forlivesi rebelled and called in the city the Milanese Visconti's condottiero, Agnolo della Pergola (14 May 1423). Florence reacted by declaring war on Visconti. Its captain Pandolfo Malatesta therefore entered Romagna to help the Alidosi of Imola, but he was defeated and the city stormed on 14 February 1424. The young Luigi degli Alidosi was sent captive to Milan and a few days later the lord of Faenza, Guidantonio Manfredi, joined the Visconti party. The Florentine army, this time commanded by Carlo Malatesta, was again defeated, at the Battle of Zagonara in July; Carlo, taken prisoner, was freed by Visconti and joined him too. Florence thus hired Niccolò Piccinino and Oddo da Montone, but the two were also beaten in Val di Lamone. Oddo was killed but Piccinino was able to convince Manfredi to declare war against Visconti.

After the failure in Romagna, Florence tried to defy the Visconti from the Ligurian side, by allying with the Aragonese of Naples. However, both a fleet of 24 Aragonese galleys sent to Genoa to move it to fight against the Milanese, and a land army, were unsuccessful. In the meantime, Piccinino and the other condottiero Francesco Sforza had been hired by Visconti, who also sent an army to invade Tuscany under Guido Torello. He subsequently defeated the Florentine army at Anghiari and Faggiuola.

The Florentine disaster was countered by the pact signed on 4 December 1425 with the Republic of Venice. By the agreement the war was to be pursued at the common expense of both: the conquests in Lombardy to be assigned to the Venetians; those in Romagna and Tuscany to the Florentines. The condottiero Carmagnola was appointed Captain General of the League. In the ensuing fighting seasons (1425–26), Carmagnola, recently in the pay of Visconti, retook Brescia, which he had recently taken on behalf of Visconti, after a long siege which saw massive use of artillery (26 November 1426). Meanwhile, the Venetian fleet on the Po River, under Francesco Bembo, advanced as far as Padua, and the Florentines regained all their lands in Tuscany. Visconti, who had already ceded Forlì and Imola to the Pope to gain his favour, called a mediation. Through the intervention of the Papal legate, Niccolò degli Albergati, the peace was signed on 30 December 1426 in Venice.

Visconti regained the lands occupied by Florence in Liguria, but had to renounce the area of Vercelli, conquered by Amadeus VIII of Savoy, and Brescia, which went to Venice, and to promise to stop encroaching himself in Romagna and Tuscany.

== Second campaign ==
The peace did not last very long. Under advice by the emperor Sigismund, Visconti refused to ratify it and the war broke out in May 1427. The Milanese were initially victorious, taking Casalmaggiore and besieging Brescello; the fleet sent there was set on fire by the Venetian fleet of Bembo; however, Niccolò Piccinino was able to defeat Carmagnola at Gottolengo on 29 May. The Venetian commander pushed him back and conquered Casalmaggiore on 12 July, while Orlando Pallavicino, lord of several castles near Parma, rebelled against the Visconti as Amadeus VIII and John Jacob of Montferrat invaded Lombardy from East.

Visconti could count on some of the best condottieri of the time, such as Sforza, della Pergola, Piccinino and Guido Torello. In order to counter their mutual jealousy, he named supreme commander Carlo Malatesta. The latter led the Milanese at Maclodio (4 October 1427), being crushed by the Venetians under Carmagnola. The victory was however indecisive, and Visconti managed to be reconciled with Amadeus by ceding him Vercelli and marrying his daughter, Marie of Savoy. However, as Sforza was defeated by some Genoese exiled and Sigismund's help was wanting, Visconti sued for a treaty. With the mediation of the Pope, the peace was signed at Ferrara on 18 April 1428. A Venetian governor was established at Bergamo and Crema (1429) in addition to confirming the Venetian possession of Brescia and its contado (neighbourhood). The Florentines recovered the strongholds they had lost, apart from Volterra, which rebelled against the new settlement. The troops sent to reduce that city, under Niccolò Fortebraccio, were later sent to invade the Lucca, whose lord, Paolo Guinigi, had previously sided with the Visconti.

== Third campaign ==
The third war (1431–1433) started, therefore, when Visconti took up the Lucchese cause, by sending them Francesco Sforza, with 3,000 horse; Sforza, however, was eventually bought off with fifty thousand ducats by the Florentines, who continued the siege of Lucca after the condottiero had left. Called in by the besieged, Visconti managed to have the Republic of Genoa (Note: Milan controlled Genoa since 1421.) declare war against Florence. The subsequent defeat on the Serchio banks of their commander Guidantonio da Montefeltro (2 December 1430), encouraged the Florentines to engage the aid of Venice once more and re-erect their lapsed League, with the favour of the new Pope, Eugene IV, a Venetian. Visconti replied by rehiring Piccinino and Sforza, who were again to face Carmagnola.

The League's army was first beaten at Soncino (17 May 1431), while Luigi Colonna defeated the Venetians at Cremona, Cristoforo Lavello pushed back the Montferrat troops, and Piccinino established strong positions in Tuscany. Another source of dismay for the revived League was the destruction of the Po Fleet under Niccolò Trevisani near Pavia (23 June). In 1431 Visconti also found a precious ally in Amadeus VIII of Savoy in exchange for his help against John Jacob of Montferrat.

Venice won a naval victory over Genoa at San Fruttuoso on 27 August 1431, but on land Carmagnola, the commander of Venetian forces, moved cautiously, avoiding a pitched battle and raising the suspicion he could have been bought by Visconti, while the latter was also joined by Sigismund who had entered Italy to receive the imperial crown. In the end Carmagnola was suspended; recalled by the Council of Ten, he was arrested in March 1432, tried for treason and beheaded outside the Doge's Palace. In November 1432 a Venetian army was crushed by Piccinino at the Battle of Delebio by a joint army of Milan and Valtellina, which had been invaded by the Serenissima in 1431.

The peace of Ferrara in May 1433 institutionalized an unsteady status quo. The Florentine war with Lucca and her allies likewise resulted in a return to the previous status quo, but the major League leader's lack of successes had lost much charisma: the Venetian doge Francesco Foscari was on the verge of resigning, while Cosimo de' Medici was imprisoned and confined in Padua. Another result of the peace agreement was the reduction of Montferrat to a satellite of Savoy.

== Fourth campaign ==
In the so-called "fourth war" broader questions were personalized in the combats among antagonistic condottieri: Gattamelata, and later Francesco Sforza fought nominally for Venice, while the Visconti side was led by Niccolò Piccinino, who had promised to Eugene IV to reconquer the Marche for him. But, in a reversal typical of the time, when he captured Ravenna and Bologna, he forced the cities to recognize Milanese suzerainty.

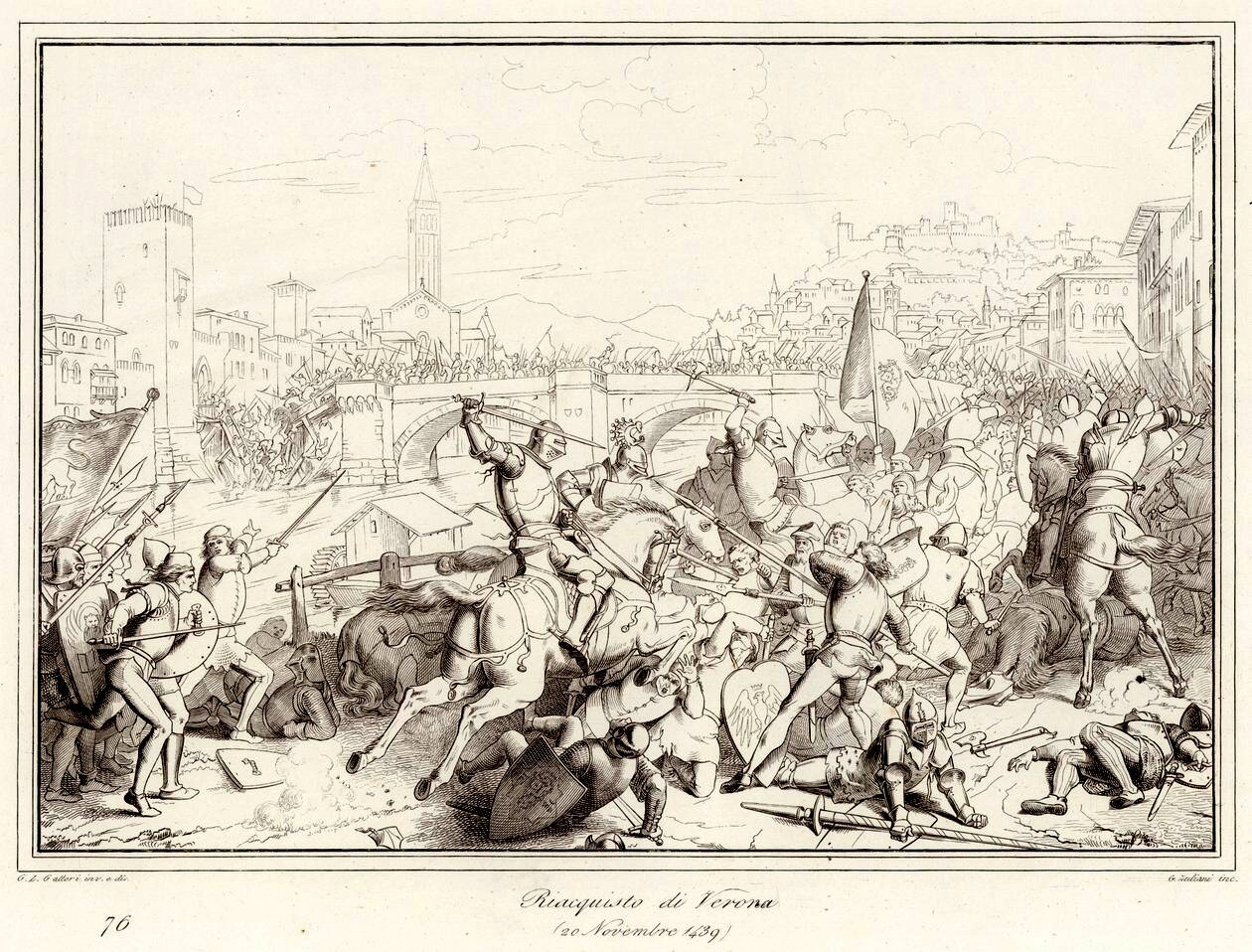
Venetian reconquest of Verona in 1439

Piccinino, backed by Gian Francesco Gonzaga, had invaded the Lombard possessions of Venice. In September 1438 he laid siege to Brescia and assaulted Bergamo and Verona. In response to this Venice signed an alliance with Florence and Francesco Sforza, including some notable captains of the time such as Astorre II Manfredi and Niccolò III of Ferrara, who was also restored the Polesine in exchange for his support.

The Milanese were repeatedly defeated in Tuscany and at Soncino (14 June 1440). The war seemed won for Venice, and Sforza went to Venice to receive the honour of a triumph. However, Piccinino returned from Romagna in February 1441 and crushed Sforza's garrison at Chiari. Sforza besieged Martinengo, but when Piccinino cut him off from any possibility of retreat the situation looked again favourable to Milan. Believing that the victory was now in his hands, he asked from Visconti the signiory of Piacenza in exchange for it. The lord of Milan preferred instead to appeal to Sforza for an agreement.

On the field of Cavriana, Sforza acted as mediator between the two sides, accomplishing the act for which Carmagnola had lost his head. No large territorial changes were made in the ensuing Peace of Cremona of 20 November 1441: Venice kept Ravenna, Florence the Casentino. Piccinino was awarded the lands of Orlando Pallavicino in the Parmense, while Filippo Maria Visconti recognized the independence of Genoa and again promised to stop interfering with the situation in Tuscany and Romagna.

== Fifth campaign ==
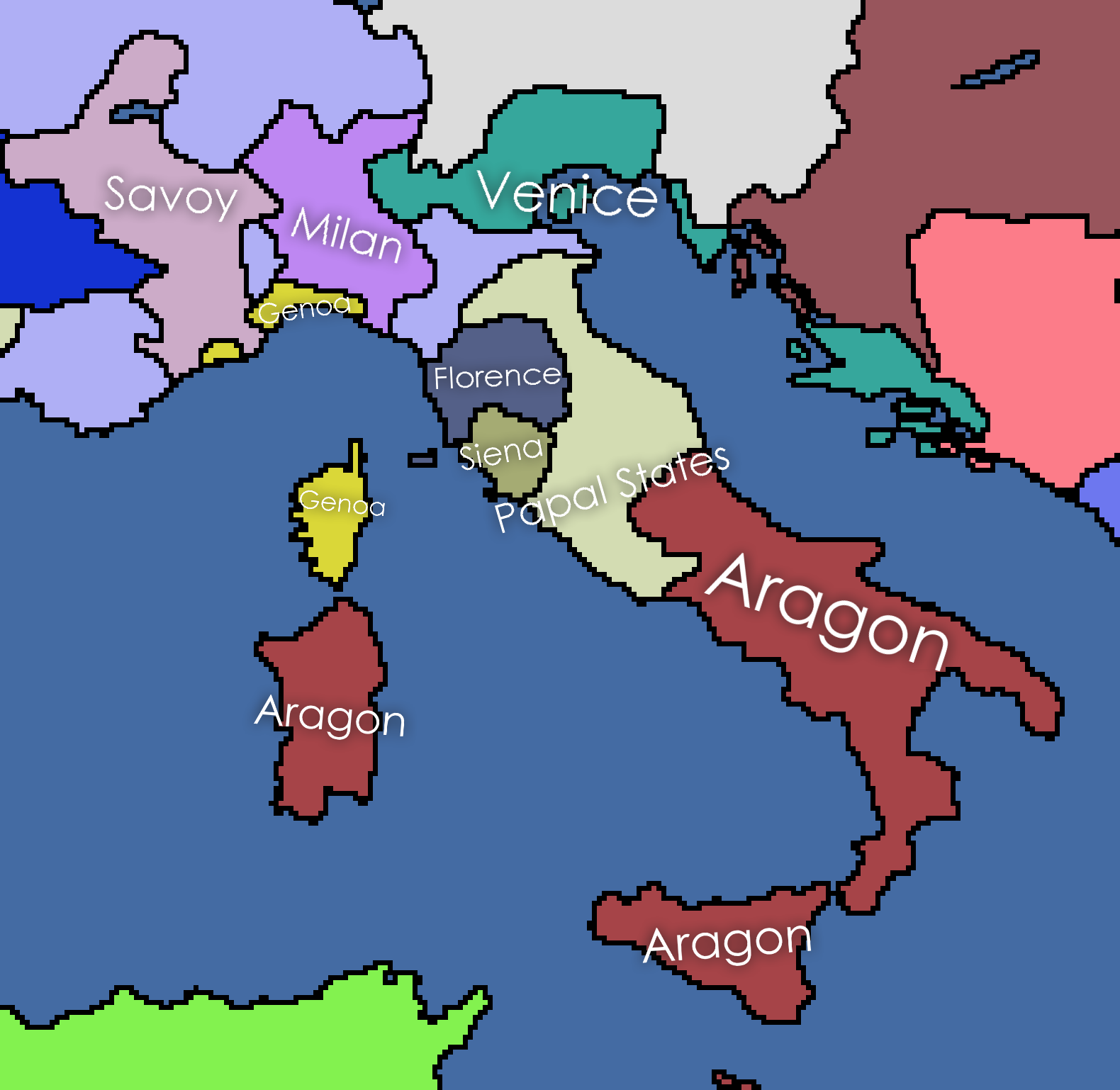
Italian peninsula after the peace of Lodi (1455)

Off the battlefields, important dynastic and political changes occurred: Francesco Sforza entered the service of Visconti and married his daughter, Bianca Maria Visconti, while Florence took a new turn under Cosimo de' Medici. After Visconti died in 1447, Francesco Sforza entered Milan in triumph (May 1450). (Note: After the demise of the short-lived Ambrosian Republic.) Two coalitions now formed: Sforza's Milan allied with Medici's Florence on the one hand, faced Venice and the Aragonese Kingdom of Naples on the other. The main theater of war remained Lombardy.

In April 1452, the Republic of Venice declared war on the Duchy of Milan, who responded by crossing the river Adda and invading the counties of Bergamo and Brescia. However, following the initial Milanese success, with the conquest of Bergamo and a large part of Bassa Bresciana, Jacopo Piccinino, commander of the Venetian army, retook the lost Venetian territories during the spring of 1453. His offensive stopped with the siege of Pontevico, between 25 and 29 May, when La Serenissima regained Pontevico, an important port and stronghold along the Oglio river. During the summer of 1453, Piccinino tried many times to get an important success over Sforza's army, without ever achieving a decisive victory. Contrariwise, the Milanese army, following the Battle of Ghedi of 15 August, conquered Ghedi and a large part of Bassa Bresciana.

During the autumn, Francesco Sforza teamed up with his ally, René of Anjou (Count of Anjou and King of Naples), who commanded the French army. So, the combined Franco-Milanese army could count on about 20,000 infantrymen and 3,500 knights: between 16 and 19 October, it successfully besieged the Castle of Pontevico and, on 17 November it successfully besieged Orzinuovi. So the Bassa Bresciana become totally occupied by the Duke of Milan and the Count of Anjou. The only Venetian cities remaining in Lombardy were Brescia, Bergamo and Crema.

In early 1454, the situation changed: the French soldiers, jaded by the war, peeved due to the continuous clashes with the Milanese and aware of the fact that their tactics were inferior to the Italian ones, decided to leave the war, with the accord of René of Anjou. So, the French army left the war and Milan and Venice decided to achieve peace. In April they reached the Treaty of Lodi, a compromise peace that formed the basis for a general accord among the four contenders, Venice, Milan, Florence and Naples, under the blessings of Pope Nicholas V, representing the fifth power in Italy. The peace of Lodi is often marked as the emergence of a consciously expressed European political principle of balance of power.

== See also ==
- War of Ferrara (1482–1484)
