= Battle of Anghiari =

1440 battle between Milan and the Italian League

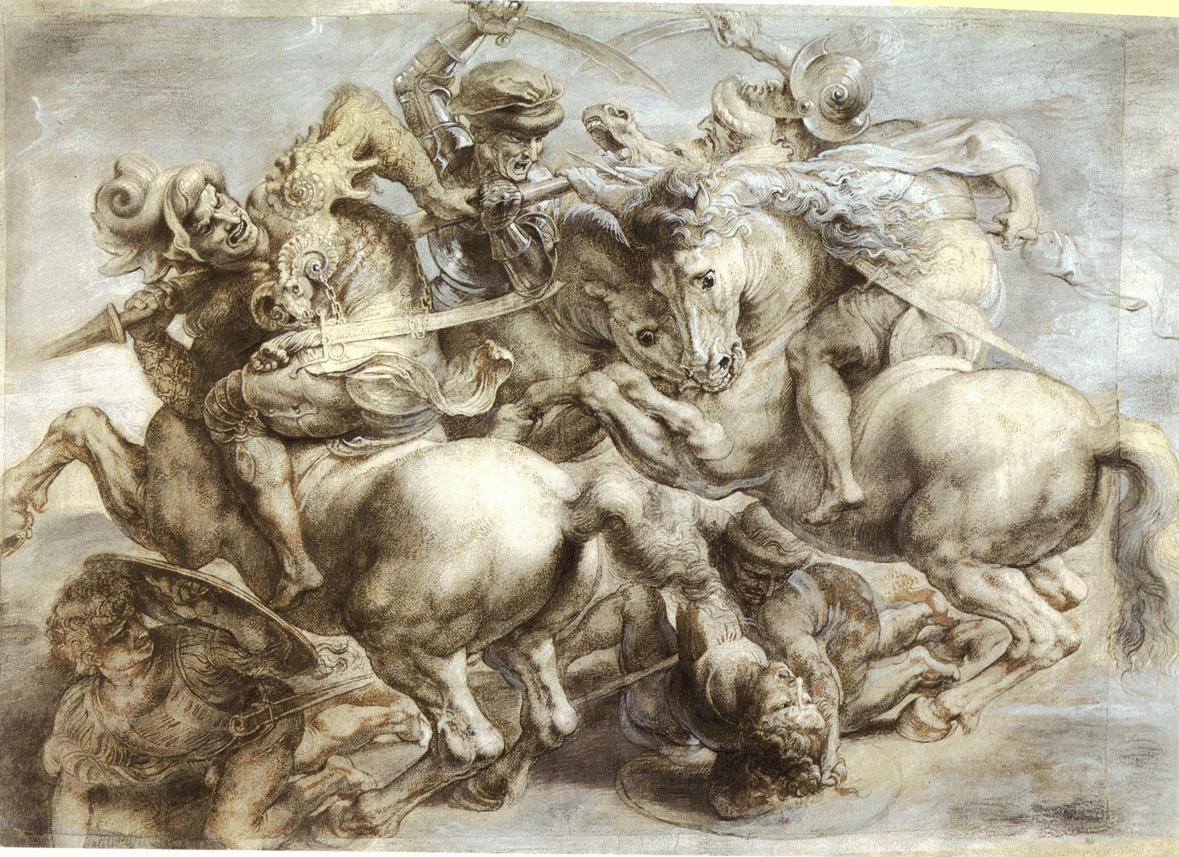
- Peter Paul Rubens's copy of Leonardo da Vinci's The Battle of Anghiari. Allegedly from left to right is Francesco Piccinino; Niccolò Piccinino; Ludovico Trevisan; Giovanni Antonio del Balzo Orsini.
Date	29 June 1440
Location	Anghiari, Province of Arezzo, Tuscany, Italy 43°33′N 12°04′E
Result	League victory

Belligerents
League of Italian states: Republic of Florence; Papal States; Republic of Venice	Duchy of Milan

Commanders and leaders
Ludovico Trevisan; Micheletto Attendolo; Giovanni Antonio del Balzo Orsini	Niccolò Piccinino

Casualties and losses
Light	Light
- Location within Italy Battle of Anghiari (Europe)

The Battle of Anghiari was fought on 29 June 1440, between the forces of Milan and the League of some Italian states led by the Republic of Florence in the course of the Wars in Lombardy. The battle was a victory for the Florentines, who secured their domination of central Italy.

The battle is well known for its depiction in a failed attempt at a painting by Leonardo da Vinci, now known only by its preparatory sketches. It is also remarkable for the fact that though the battle lasted all day, involving several thousand troops, it was said that only one soldier was killed; according to Niccolò Machiavelli, after four hours of skirmishing, the single death occurred "when a soldier fell off his horse". Frances S. Saunders estimates that "as many as 900" soldiers may in fact have died in the battle.

== Battle ==
The League's army concentrated on Anghiari, a small centre of Tuscany, and comprised: 4,000 Papal troops, under Cardinal Ludovico Trevisan; a Florentine contingent of around the same size, and a company of 300 men-at-arms (knights) from Venice, led by Micheletto Attendolo. Other men joined for the occasion from Anghiari itself.

The numerically superior Milanese force was led by the famous condottiero Niccolò Piccinino in the name of Duke Filippo Maria Visconti and reached the area on the night of 28 June. Some 2,000 men from the nearby town of Sansepolcro joined the Milanese. Confident in his superior manpower, and on the element of surprise, Piccinino ordered an attack in the afternoon of the following day. However, the dust lifted by the Milanese on the Sansepolcro-Anghiari road was noticed by Micheletto, and the League's forces were made ready for battle.

Micheletto's Venetian knights blocked the Milanese vanguard on the only bridge over the channel protecting the League's camp. Micheletto and the Venetians held the bridge, allowing the greater part of the League's army to form for battle, but were eventually pushed back by Milanese reinforcements led by the captains Francesco Piccinino and Astorre II Manfredi. The Milanese advanced, but their right flank was soon ferociously engaged by the Papal troops, and was obliged to retreat to the bridge. The battle continued for four hours, until a surrounding manoeuvre managed to cut off a third of the Milanese on the League side of the channel. The battle continued into the night but ended with a victory for the League army.

== Casualties ==
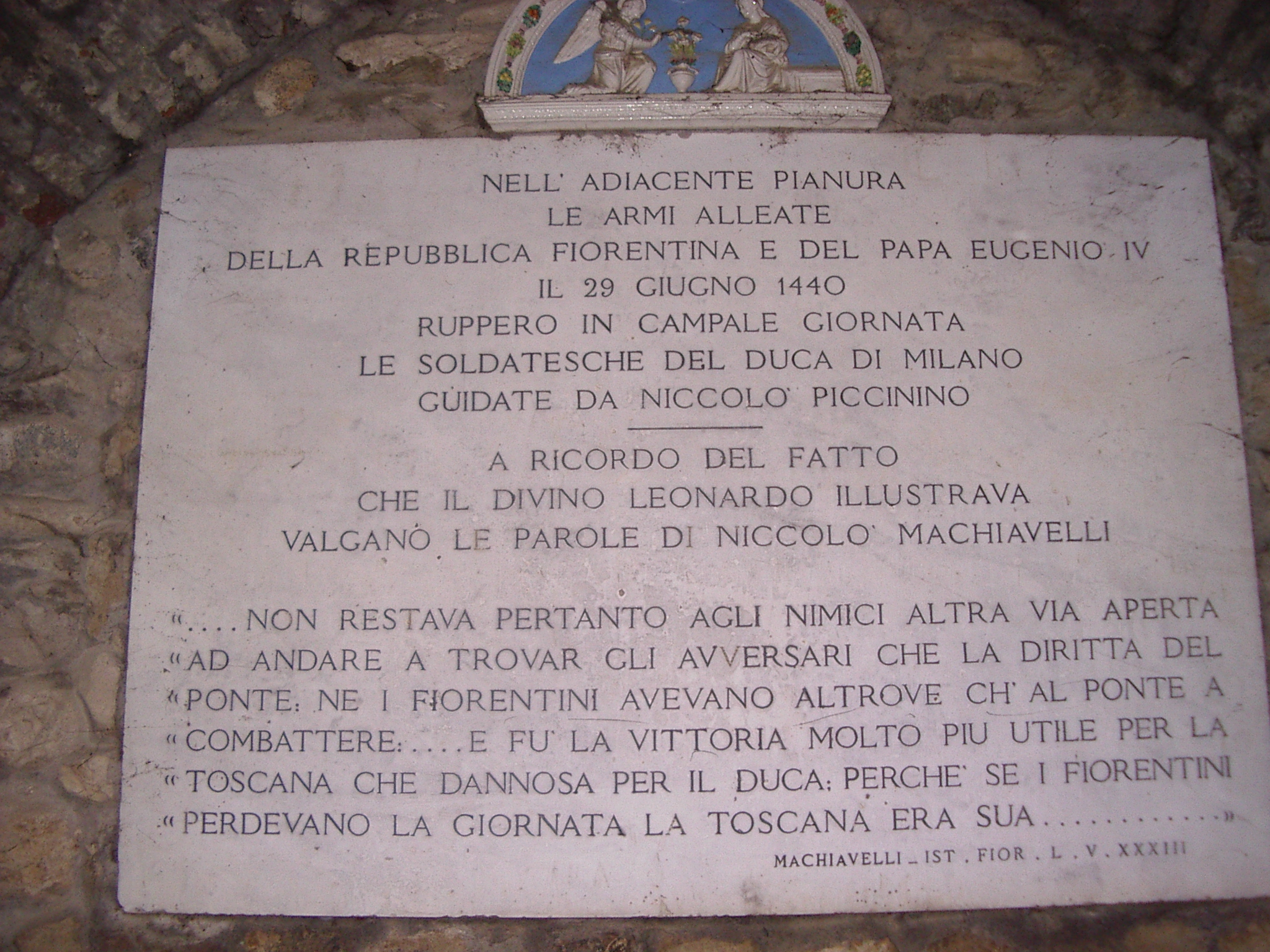
Plaque in memory of the battle of Anghiari

The battle was described in histories written by contemporaries Leonardo Bruni and Flavio Biondo, both of whom concentrate on the actions of individuals, though there is some discussion of equipment and tactics. Machiavelli, in contrast, gives a detailed account of the strategy and tactics used by both sides, but presents the battle as "a striking example of the wretched state of military discipline in those times", arguing that the mercenary knights who ran the armies of the day had no motive to fight for victory.

Nor was there ever an instance of wars being carried on in an enemy's country with less injury to the assailants than at this; for in so great a defeat, and in a battle which continued four hours, only one man died, and he, not from wounds inflicted by hostile weapons, or any honorable means, but, having fallen from his horse, was trampled to death. Combatants then engaged with little danger; being nearly all mounted, covered with armor, and preserved from death whenever they chose to surrender, there was no necessity for risking their lives; while fighting, their armor defended them, and when they could resist no longer, they yielded and were safe.

Machiavelli adds that "This victory was much more advantageous to the Florentines than injurious to the duke; for, had they been conquered, Tuscany would have been his own; but he, by his defeat, only lost the horses and accoutrements of his army, which could be replaced without any very serious expense".

Whether or not the claimed single death is an exaggeration is not known. Hans Delbrück argues that,

The great historians of the Renaissance, Machiavelli, Guicciardini, and Jovius, were agreed in stating that the condottieri waged war simply as a game and not in bloody earnest. It was their judgment that these men, guided by self-interest, in order to extend the war as long as possible so that they might obtain the most possible pay, did not seek a decision in battle. On the contrary, they avoided that, and when it did finally come down to a battle, the men on both sides, who regarded themselves mutually as comrades, spared one another and shed no blood. In the battle of Anghiari in 1440, for example, it is reported that one man died, to be sure, but he was not struck down but drowned in a swamp. Later scholars have no doubt characterized this kind of warfare as having raised war to a work of art, that is, the skill of maneuver, through the efforts of these condottieri.

Delbrück says that "close examination of the contemporary reports has shown that there is not a true word in this entire description". However, it is true that the warfare of the period was far less brutal than that of the later period in which Machiavelli wrote, as knights could indeed expect to surrender for ransom. While it is possible that only one mounted knight died at Anghiari, foot-soldiers are unlikely to have been as lucky. Frances S. Saunders says that "as many as 900" soldiers may in fact have died in the battle.

== Cultural depictions ==
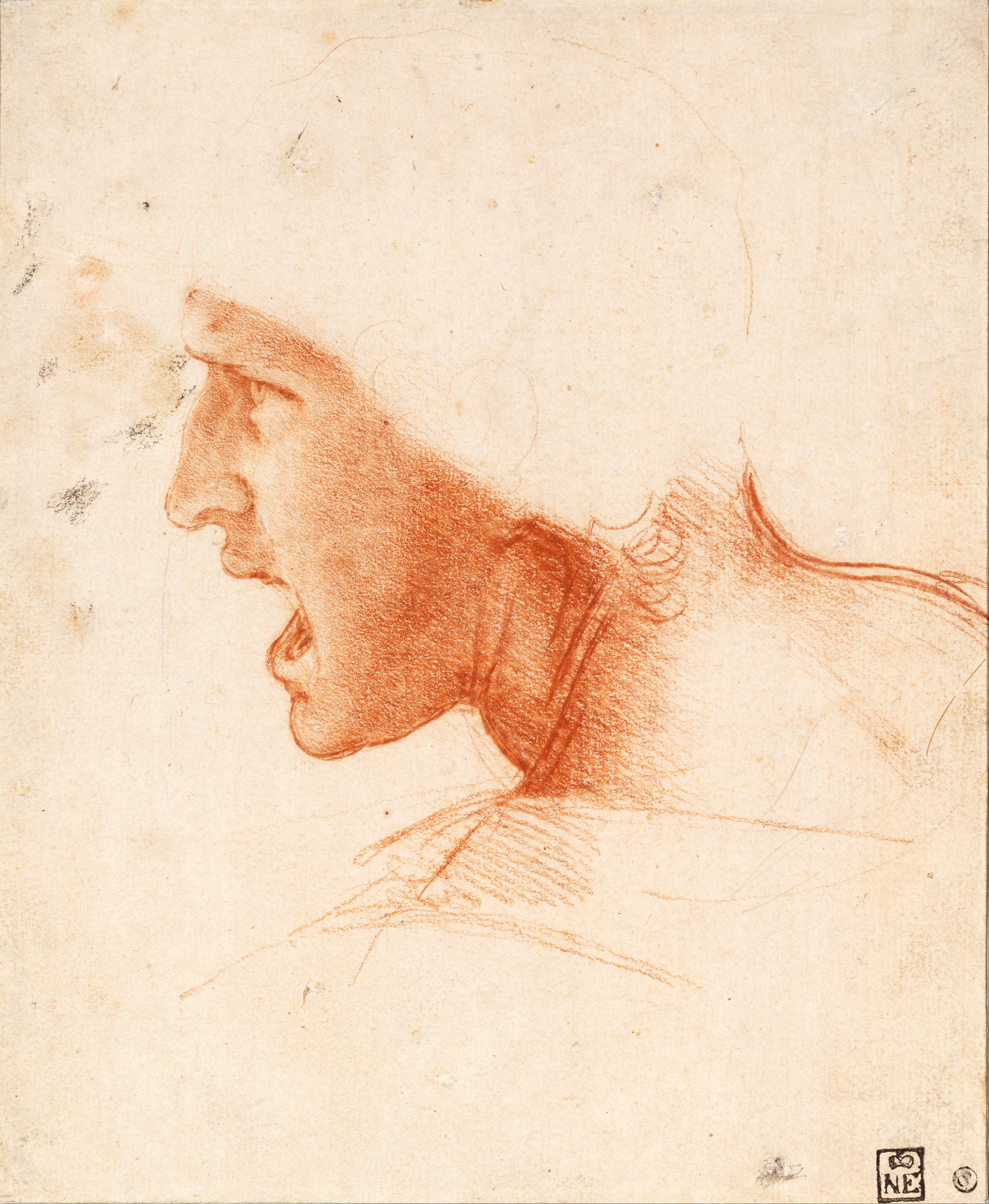
A study drawing by Leonardo for The Battle of Anghiari

According to Pia F. Cuneo, "Anghiari is one of the most frequently represented battles of the era". The earliest known image, painted within a decade of the battle, is a cassone panel by an unknown artist known as the Anghiari Master, which emphasises the tournament-like nature of the conflict, with banners and ritual engagements.

More than seven decades later, the battle was the subject of a now-lost painting by Leonardo da Vinci, known through copies of the central scene made by other artists. The known portion of the painting depicted a battle over a standard between knights on opposing sides. The picture was commissioned to occupy one of the walls of the council chamber of the Florentine republic in the Palazzo Vecchio. The other wall was to have a painting by Michelangelo depicting an earlier Florentine victory at the Battle of Cascina in 1364.

A 1687 relief sculpture depicting the battle by Baroque artist Giovanni Battista Foggini in Santa Maria del Carmine, Florence depicts Saint Andrew Corsini guiding the Florentine forces to victory.
