= Battle of Soncino =

1431 battle between Venice and Milan

The Battle of Soncino was a battle of the Wars in Lombardy, fought in March 1431. It was fought between the armies of the Republic of Venice, under Count of Carmagnola, and of the Duchy of Milan, under Francesco I Sforza.

The Milanese victoriously ambushed the Venetians, and captured 1,500 cavalry and 500 infantry.

== See also ==
- Battle of Pavia (1431)
