= Francesco Piccinino =

Italian condottiero

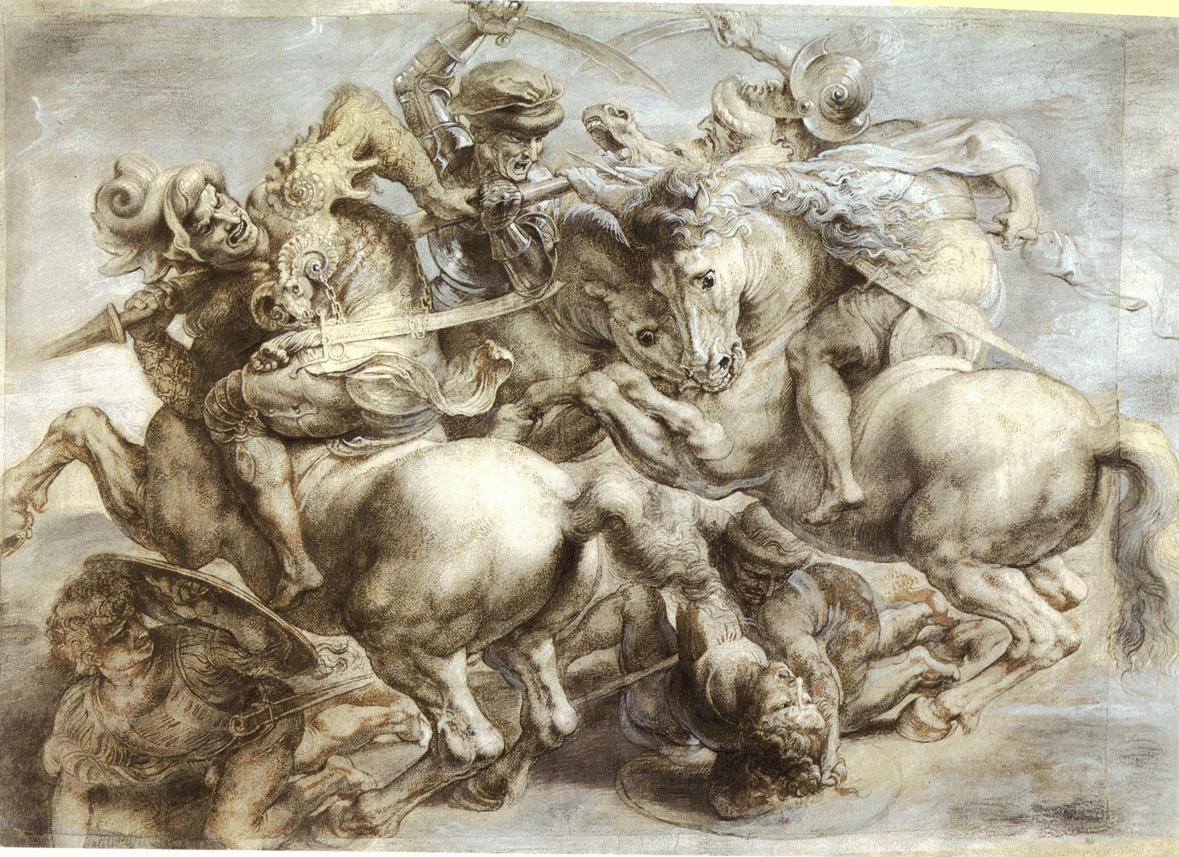
Peter Paul Rubens's copy of The Battle of Anghiari by Leonardo da Vinci. Allegedly Francesco Piccinino is the horseman at the far left

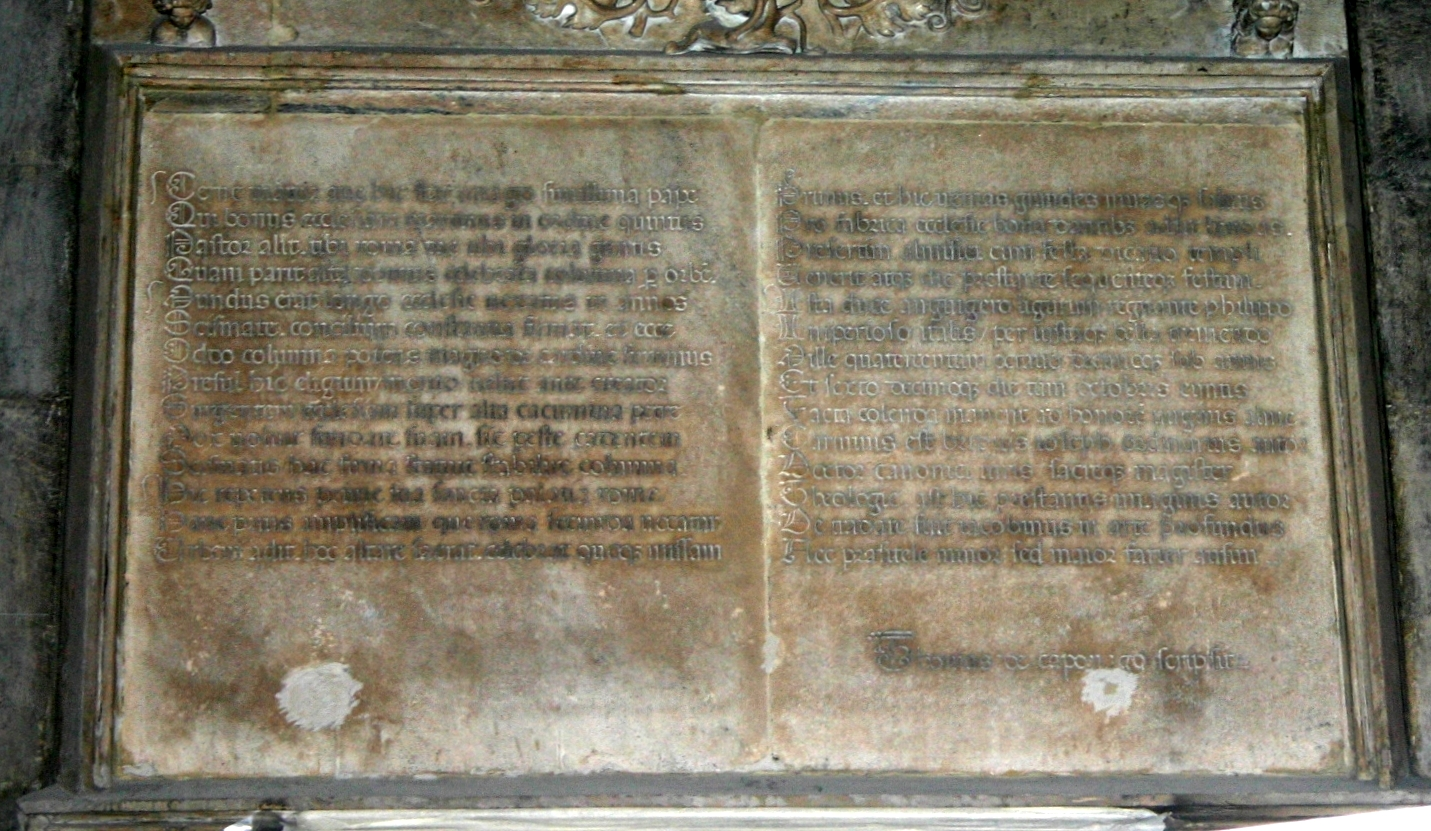
Latin epitaph of Francesco Piccinino.

Francesco Piccinino (c. 1407 – 16 October 1449) was an Italian condottiero.

He was the adopted son of the condottiero Niccolò Piccinino, (1386-1444), making him the adopted brother of Jacopo Piccinino (1423-1465). Francesco earned a reputation as a gallant warrior serving the Duchy of Milan under the Visconti and the Papal States under Pope Martin V (d. 1431). In 1436, he was serving the Aragonese Kings of Naples, and he took part in the 1437 siege of Cerreto Umbra against Francesco Sforza. After some successes, he besieged Assisi and then Pergola.

In 1440, he participated in the Battle of Anghiari and was badly defeated. On 19 August 1444 he was again defeated by Sforza's forces at Montolmo (now Corridonia) and taken prisoner, while his brother Jacopo was able to escape.

In 1446, Piccinino fought against Micheletto Attendolo near Cremona. Niccolo and Luigi dal Verme besieged that city, paid by Filippo Maria Visconti. Scaramuccia da Forlì, sent by the Venetian government, relieved the siege of Cremona.

On 28 September the same year Piccinino suffered a defeat at Casalmaggiore. It was followed by a more serious one at Monte Brianza in 1447.

Despite these setbacks, he managed to gain a contract under the newly formed and short-lived Ambrosian Republic (1447-1450) together with Jacopo, in order to thwart Sforza's claim to be Duke of Milan. He did not live to see Sforza's victory. He fell ill and died in 1449. His symptoms included edema, which suggests several possible conditions or diseases that might have caused his death. He married Camilla da Montone, daughter of the condottiero Braccio da Montone (1368-1424), in 1443.

== See also ==
- Condottieri
- Wars in Lombardy

== Sources ==
- Block, Wolfgang (1913). Die condottieri. Berlin.
