= Italic League =

International defense agreement

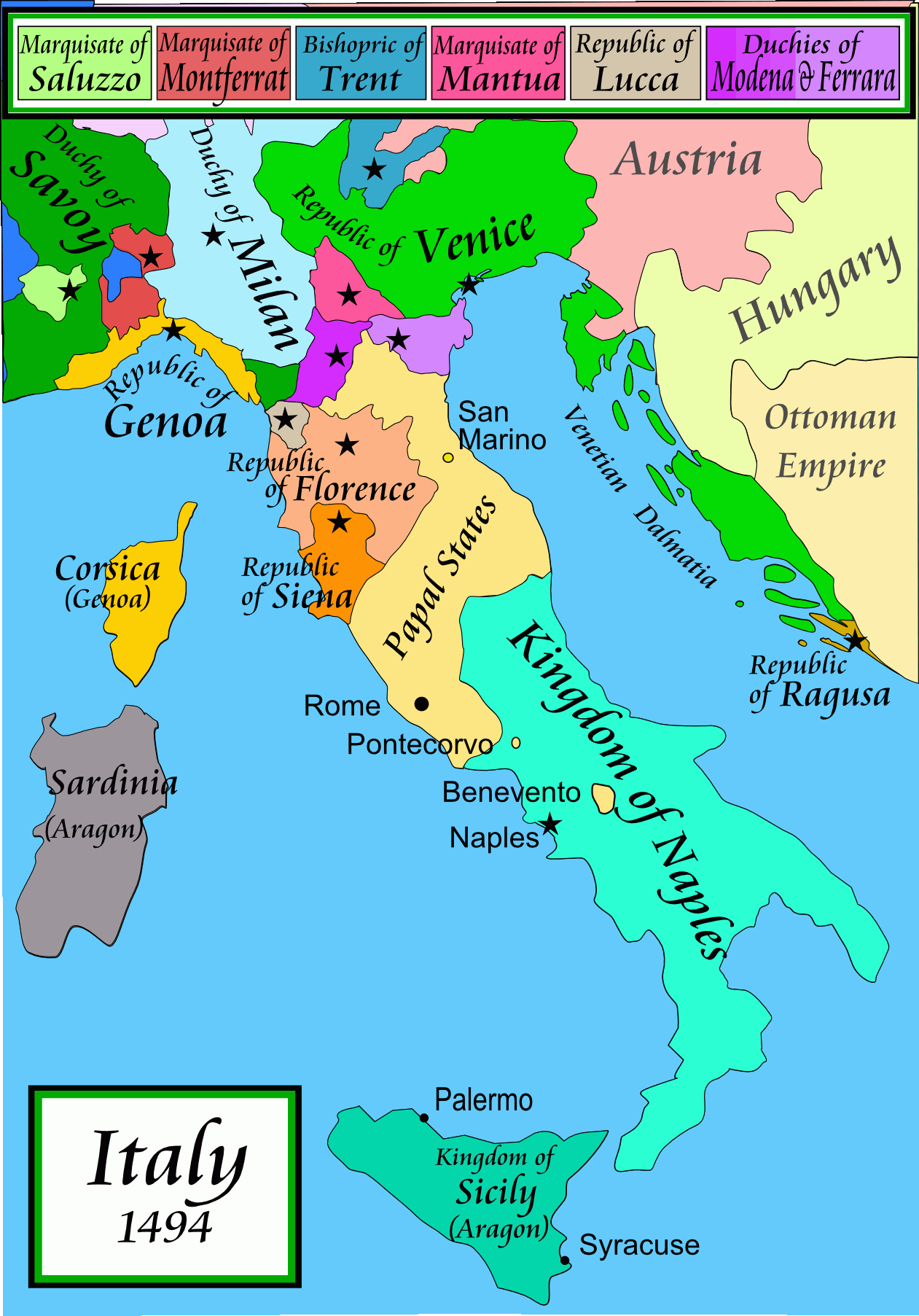
- Italy in 1494, showing the borders that were broadly stabilised by the treaty 40 years earlier
- Context: Treaty of Lodi, after the Wars in Lombardy
- Signed: August 30, 1454
- Location: Venice, Republic of Venice
- Expiry: 1494
- Signatories: Papal States; Republic of Venice; Duchy of Milan; Republic of Florence; Kingdom of Naples

The Italic League or Most Holy League was an international agreement concluded in Venice on 30 August 1454, between the Papal States, the Republic of Venice, the Duchy of Milan, the Republic of Florence, and the Kingdom of Naples, following the Treaty of Lodi a few months previously. The next forty years were marked by peace and economic expansion based on a balance of power within Italy. The decline of the League brought about the Italian Wars.

== Background ==
In the first half of the 15th century, the larger Italian powers had been consolidating their territories, with Savoy expanding towards the Ligurian Coast, Venice focusing on Terraferma while the Stato da Màr was threatened by Turkish expansion, Milan expanding southwards (and, even after the dismembering of the empire after Gian Galeazzo Visconti's death, retaining the bulk of Lombardy), the Florentines having gained most of Tuscany and the Papal States having begun an expansion in central Italy that would continue into the next century, while King Alfonso V of Aragon expanded from Sicily into the Kingdom of Naples.

Solemnly proclaimed on 2 March 1455 with the accession of Pope Nicholas V (1447–1455), King Alfonso, and other small states to the League (excluding Malatestine Rimini, at Alfonso's insistence), it established a mutual defense agreement and a 25-year truce between the Italian powers, forbidding separate alliances and treaties while committing to maintenance of the established boundaries. The other Italian states acknowledged the condottiero Francesco Sforza as successor to the last of the Visconti of Milan, after having married the only daughter of Filippo Maria Visconti. The relative peace and stability resulting from Lodi and the League, promoted by Sforza, allowed him to consolidate his rule over Milan. It was Cosimo de' Medici's most important foreign policy decision to end the traditional rivalry between his Florence and Sforza's Milan.

== Consequences ==
The Italic League played an essential part in the balance of power subsequently pursued by the Florentine ruler Lorenzo de' Medici (1449–1492); its only cracks were the Pazzi conspiracy, the Barons' conspiracy, and the Salt War. The League provided enough stability to allow the peninsular economy to recover from the population loss and economic depression caused by the Black Death and its aftermath, leading to an economic expansion that endured until the first part of the 17th century. The League also enabled the creation of the first permanent embassies amongst the states of the Italian peninsula, in order to monitor compliance with the terms prohibiting supporting exiled dissidents, with De Officio Legati — what seems to be the first treatise on ambassadorship — written by Ermolao Barbaro in Venice in 1490, after he had served the Serenìsima in Burgundy and Milan.

The death of Lorenzo de' Medici in 1492 marked the decline of the League. He had been one of its greatest supporters and prime maintainer, recognising the advantage of maintaining a balance among the five powers as opposed to trying to eliminate his enemies. Whilst the League failed to prevent the French invasion in 1494 that began the Italian Wars, it did enable (as the League of Venice) the creation of the army that repelled Charles VIII's army after its sack of Naples. The League army engaged the French at Fornovo and retained control of the battlefield but failed to prevent an orderly French retreat. The Venetian alliance with France and Spain against Milan and Naples in the Italian Wars of 1499–1504, however, sounded the death knell for the League.

As a result of the détente, unlike France, Spain, and England, Italy did not coalesce into a single monarchy in the Middle Ages, and was consequently left vulnerable to invasion from more powerful neighbours. Several factors have been considered causes of this; Francesco Guicciardini blamed particularism, for example, while Niccolò Machiavelli believed it resulted from the moral and civil decay of institutions and morals and in papal policy, for centuries aimed at avoiding the formation of a unified Italy. It should be borne in mind, however, that Machiavelli's great work The Prince was a reflection of the political equilibrium resulting from the League's existence.

== See also ==
- Wars in Lombardy
- Treaty of Lodi
- Italian Wars
- Papal States
- Republic of Venice
- Duchy of Milan
- Republic of Florence
- Kingdom of Naples
