= Battle on the Po (1431) =

1431 naval battle between Milan and Venice

Coordinates: 45°08′N 10°02′E

- Part of Wars in Lombardy
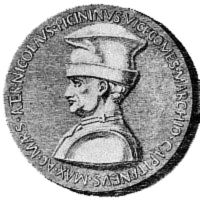
- Niccolò Piccinino, condottiero of the Duchy of Milan
Date	6 June 1431
Location	Po River, Cremona, Lombardy
Result	Ducal Milanese victory

Belligerents
Duchy of Milan	Republic of Venice

Commanders and leaders
Francesco Sforza; Niccolò Piccinino; Pacino Eustachio; Giovanni Grimaldi	Count of Carmagnola; Niccolò Trevisani

Strength
Powerful force of Vessels, superior in number, but inferior in size & strength	37 Galleys; 100 Small Craft

Casualties and losses
Unknown	2,500 Killed; 8,000 Captured; Including 16 Patricians; 70 Ships Looted; Including 28 Galleys; 600,000 Florins

The Battle on the Po was a battle of the Wars in Lombardy. It occurred in June 1431, on the Po River, near Cremona. The battle was fought between 85 Venetian galleys, sent towards Cremona to support Count of Carmagnola's army, and a somewhat superior number of Milanese galleys. The Venetians were commanded by Niccolò Trevisani.

The battle resulted in the defeat of the Venetians, who could not be helped by Carmagnola's field army, with a loss of c. 2,500 men, 28 galleys, and 42 transport ships.

== Battle ==
In the late evening of 21 June 1431 the Milanese fleet attacked the Venetian one on the Po near Cremona but five galleons of the former, detached from the rest of the fleet, were soon surrounded and captured, then darkness temporarily ceased hostilities. Francesco Sforza and Niccolò Piccinino, informed of what had happened, decided to board the ships at night together with the most chosen militias and to prevent Carmagnola from imitating them, they sent two spies to the Venetian camp with the task of spreading the word that Piccinino, in dawn, would have attacked them. At the first light of dawn on 22 June, the Milanese fleet engaged the Venetian one which did not expect to be attacked again after the defeat of the previous evening. The battle lasted about 12 hours and took place on the stretch of river just downstream from the city of Cremona. To try to avoid defeat, Trevisan several times sent messengers to Carmagnola to come to his aid but these, fearing a surprise attack by Piccinino, decided not to intervene. Many Venetian gelee, larger and with a greater draft than the Milanese ones, ran aground on the scree of the river and were easily captured, including the flagship of the Trevisan. Having lost all hope of victory, Trevisan decided to withdraw with what remained of the Venetian fleet.

== Aftermath ==
The Venetians lost 28-29 galleons and 42 minor ships, 9,000-11,000 men between dead and prisoners, 60,000 ducats ready to pay the troop pay, 1,500 hand cannons, 2,000 cuirasses and as many crossbows together with banners and provisions with an estimated damage around to 600,000 guilders. During the battle a quarrel severely wounded Niccolò Piccinino in the neck severing his nerves and making him lame for the rest of his life. But the defeat blocked the operations of the entire Venetian army, given that the Venetian authorities considered it imprudent to cross the Adda, the last line of defense for Milan, without the support of a river fleet, and thus the entire war campaign was nullified. from Carmagnola until then. The Venetian ships captured by the Visconti fleet were brought in triumph to Pavia (headquarters of the Visconti fleet), where they were still on display in the 16th century.

== See also ==
- Battle of Soncino
