= Francesco Bussone da Carmagnola =

Italian condottiero

Francesco Bussone
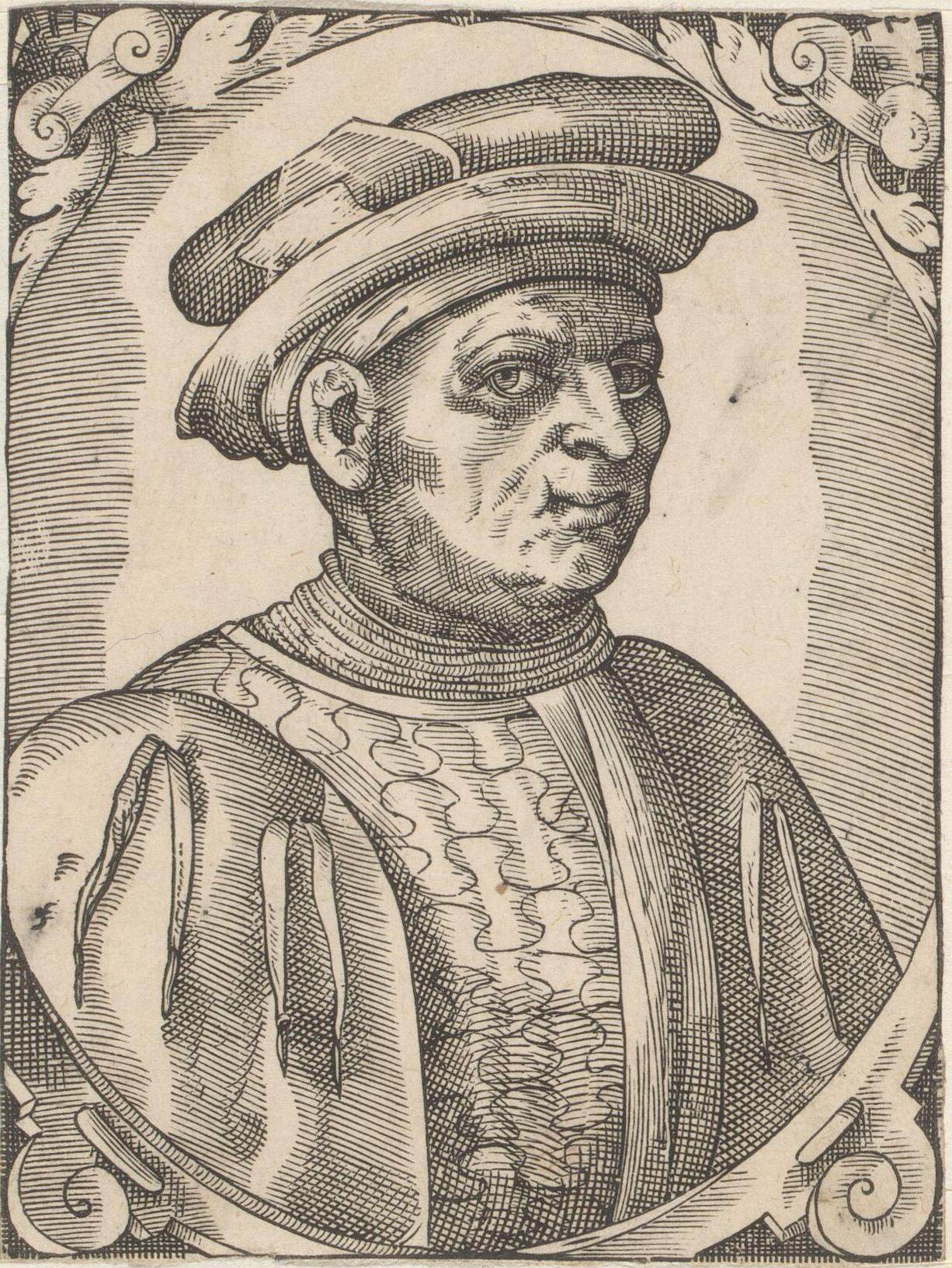
- Portrait of Francesco Bussone by Tobias Stimmer
- Born: c. 1382; Carmagnola, Savoyard state
- Died: 5 May 1432; Venice, Republic of Venice
- Cause of death: Decapitation
- Burial place: San Francesco Grande
- Spouse: Antonia Visconti (m. 1417)
- Military career
- Allegiance: Duchy of Milan (1394–1425); Republic of Venice (1425-1432)
- Branch: Venetian army
- Service years: 1394–1432
- Rank: Captain general
- Nickname: Il Conte di Carmagnola (The Count of Carmagnola)
- Conflicts: See battles: Transalpine campaigns of the Old Swiss Confederacy; Battle of Arbedo (1422); Wars in Lombardy; Battle of Maclodio (1427); Battle of Soncino (1431); Battle on the Po (1431)

Francesco Bussone, often called Count of Carmagnola (c. 1382 – 5 May 1432), was an Italian condottiero.

== Life ==
Bussone was born at Carmagnola, near Turin, in a humble peasant family. He began his military career when twelve years old under Facino Cane, a condottiero then in the service of the Marquess of Montferrat and later Gian Galeazzo Visconti, duke of Milan.

On the death of Cane, the duchy was divided among his captains; but Gian Galeazzo's son and heir, Filippo Maria, determined to reconquer it by force of arms. Facino Cane being dead, Visconti applied to Carmagnola, then in his thirtieth year, and gave him command of the army. Carmagnola's success was astonishingly rapid: he subdued Bergamo, Brescia, Parma, Genoa, and other cities. Soon the whole duchy was brought once more under Visconti's sway. But Filippo Maria, although he rewarded Carmagnola generously, feared that he might become a danger to himself, and instead of giving him further military commands made him governor of Genoa.

Carmagnola felt greatly aggrieved, and failing to obtain a personal interview with the duke, threw up his commission and offered his services to the Venetians (1425). He was well received in Venice, for the republic was beginning to fear the ambitions of the Visconti, and the new doge, Francesco Foscari, was anxious to join the Florentines and go to war with Milan. Carmagnola himself represented the duke's forces as much less numerous than they were supposed to be, and said that the moment was an opportune one to attack him. These arguments, combined with the doge's warlike temper, prevailed; Carmagnola was made captain-general of St. Mark in 1426, and war was declared.

But while the republic was desirous of rapid and conclusive operations, it was to the interest of Carmagnola, as indeed to all other soldiers of fortune, to make the operations last as long as possible, to avoid decisive operations, and to liberate all prisoners quickly. Consequently, the campaign dragged on interminably, some battles were won and others lost, truces and peace treaties were made only to be broken, and no definite result was achieved.

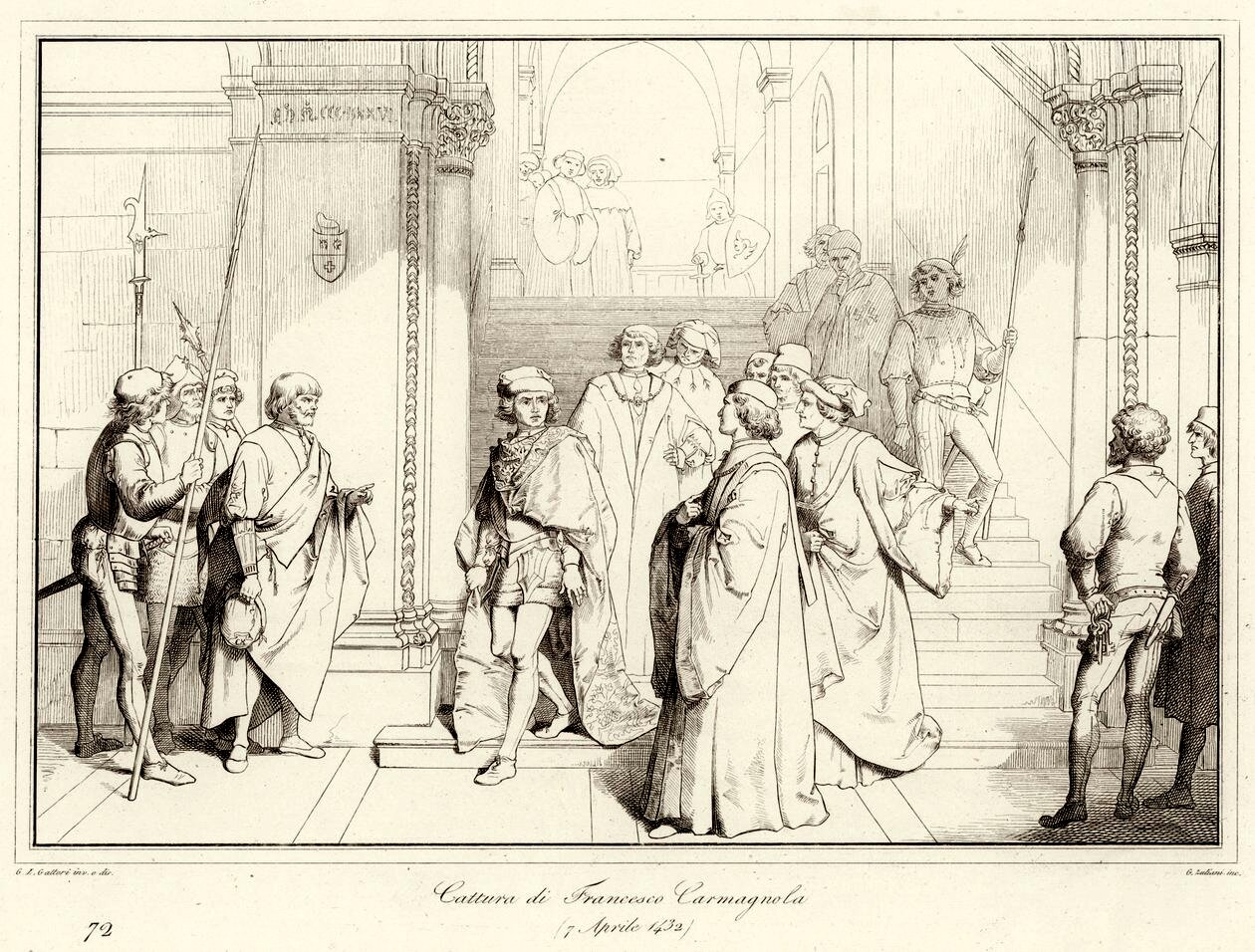
The capture of the Count of Carmagnola, drawing by Giuseppe Lorenzo Gatteri

Carmagnola's most important success was the battle of Maclodio (1427), but he did not follow it up. The republic, impatient of his dilatoriness, raised his emoluments and promised him immense fiefs including the lordship of Milan, so as to increase his ardour, but in vain. At the same time, Carmagnola was perpetually receiving messengers from Visconti, who offered him great rewards if he would abandon the Venetians. The general trifled with his past as with his present employers, believing in his foolish vanity that he held the fate of both in his hand. But the Venetians were dangerous masters to trifle with, and when they, at last, lost all patience, the Council of Ten determined to bring him to justice.

Summoned to Venice to discuss future operations on 29 March 1432, he came without suspicion. On his arrival at the ducal palace, he was seized, imprisoned and brought to trial for treason against the republic. Although the doge befriended him he was condemned to death and beheaded on 5 May. A man of ability, his great mistake was that he failed to see that he could not do with a solvent and strong government what he could with bankrupt tyrants without military resources, and that the astute Visconti meant to ruin him for his abandonment.

In 1416, Carmagnola ordered for military reasons the destruction of the Trezzo Bridge, the largest single-arch bridge in the medieval world. His daughter Luchina was married to the condottiero Luigi dal Verme. He met with Giovanni Fontana.

== Culture ==
Alessandro Manzoni made Francesco Bussone the subject of a poetical drama, Il Conte di Carmagnola (1820).

An opera Le Comte de Carmagnola with a libretto by Eugène Scribe and music by Ambroise Thomas was staged at the Paris Opéra on 19 April 1841. A soprano showpiece from the opera has been recorded by Elizabeth Vidal on Talent DOM 2910 77.

Carmagnola is a character in Rafael Sabatini's Bellarion, though he is portrayed as swaggering and self-important, and becomes a minor antagonist.

A sculpted porphyry head widely thought to represent Justinian, on the exterior facade of St Mark's Basilica in Venice, has been nicknamed Carmagnola following Bussone's beheading.
