= Treaty of Lodi =

1454 Italian peace treaty which ended the Wars in Lombardy

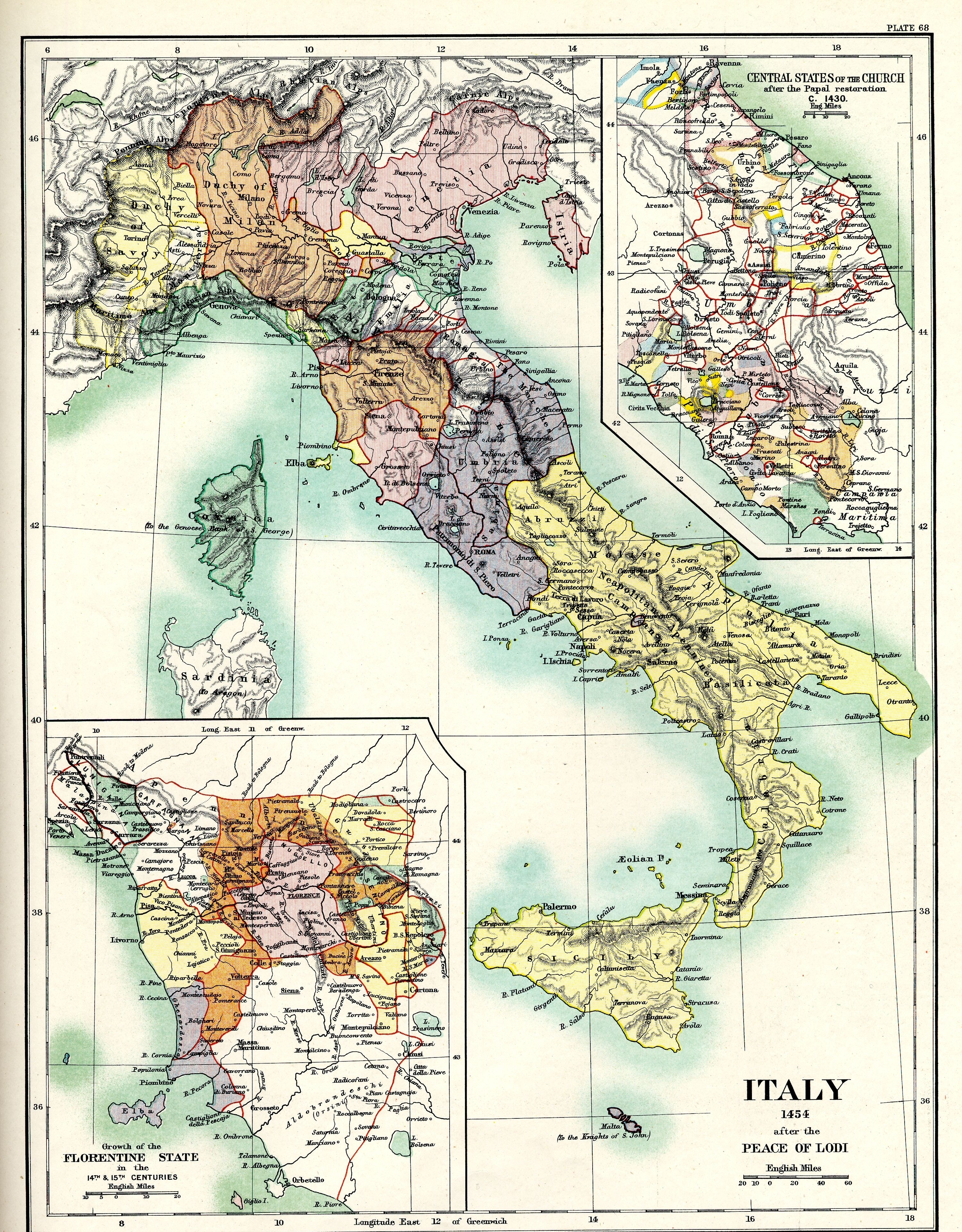
- Context: Conflict between the Duchy of Milan and the Republic of Venice with their respective allies.
- Signed: 9 April 1454
- Location: Broletto Palace, Lodi, Duchy of Milan (present-day Lombardy, Italy)
- Parties: Duchy of Milan; Republic of Venice; Republic of Florence; Kingdom of Naples

The Treaty of Lodi, or Peace of Lodi, was a peace agreement which brought to an end the Wars in Lombardy between the Venetian Republic and the Duchy of Milan, signed in the city of Lodi on 9 April 1454.

== Political background ==
After the death of the Duke of Milan Filippo Maria Visconti in 1447, the Golden Ambrosian Republic was proclaimed in Milan. The rulers decided to entrust the defense of the newborn state to Francesco I Sforza. The latter, after three years, proclaimed himself duke of Milan. In fact, for some time Venice had not abandoned its ambitions to expand into Lombardy and thus forged an alliance with Alfonso V of Aragon, king of Naples, and the emperor Frederick III of Habsburg, against Francesco Sforza and his allies. But the fall of Constantinople endangered the safety of the Venetian possessions in the Aegean Sea, so the Serenissima decided to put an end to its wars in the peninsula.

== The treaty ==
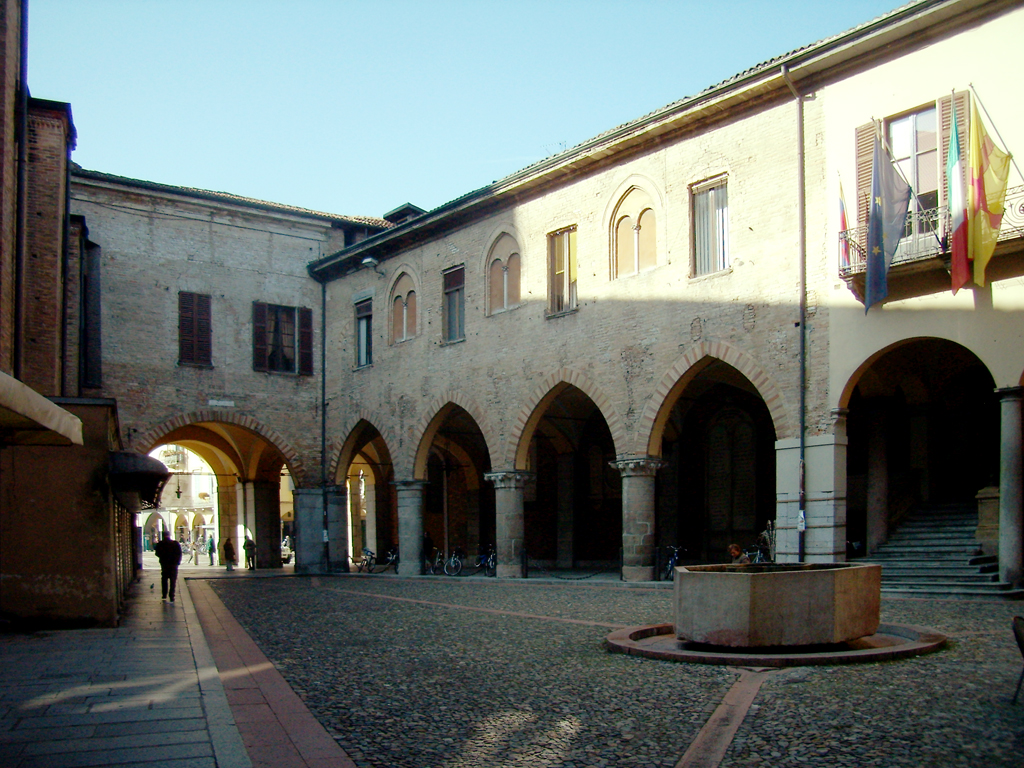
Broletto Palace, the location where the treaty was signed.

Venice and Milan concluded the final peace on 9 April 1454 at the residence of Francesco Sforza in Lodi. The Venetian signatories were Simone da Camerino and Paolo Barbo. The treaty was ratified by the most powerful Italian states, first of all Florentine Republic, which had sided with Milan thanks to the long-standing relationship between Cosimo de' Medici and Francesco Sforza.

After the treaty, Northern Italy was practically divided between the two states, despite the fact that some other powers persisted: the House of Savoy, the Republic of Genoa, the House of Gonzaga and the House of Este. It also established the succession of Francesco Sforza to the Duchy of Milan, the movement of the frontier between the aforementioned states on the Adda river, the affixing of border signs along the entire demarcation line and the beginning of the Italic League. The lands of Asola, Lonato and Peschiera came under the dominion of the Venetian Republic, disappointing the expectations of the Gonzagas, who had always aimed for these places.

== Historical significance of the treaty ==
The importance of the Treaty of Lodi consists in having given the peninsula a new political-institutional structure which - by limiting the particular ambitions of the various states - ensured a balance of power for 40 years and the development of the Renaissance.

Wars that took place in this period in Italy include the War of Ferrara, the Ottoman invasion of southern Italy, the conflicts related to the Pazzi conspiracy, and the wars related to the Conspiracy of the Barons.

Some scholars have argued that the treaty provided a proto-Westphalian model of an inter-city-state system (as opposed to an inter-nation-state system) following a century of warfare in Northern Italy. The treaty functioned to temporarily institutionalize a regional balance of power in which outright warfare gave way to diplomacy.

Lorenzo the Magnificent - in the second part of the fifteenth century - became the guarantor of this political equilibrium, implementing his famous "equilibrium policy".

== See also ==
- Duchy of Milan
- Republic of Florence
- Francesco I Sforza
- Republic of Venice
