= Erasmo of Narni =

Italian condottiero

Gattamelata
- Detail of Donatello's equestrian statue of Gattamelata
- Born: Erasmo da Narni; 1370; Narni, Umbria, Papal States
- Died: 16 January 1443 (aged 72–73); Padua, Venetian Republic
- Occupation: Condottiero
- Children: Polissena

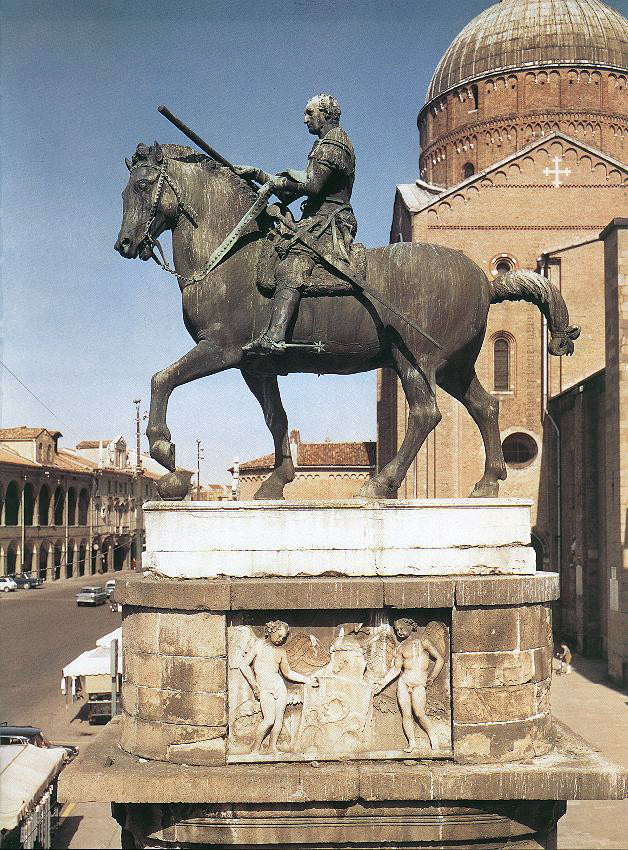
Donatello's equestrian statue of Gattamelata

Erasmo Stefano of Narni (1370 – 16 January 1443), better known by his nickname of Gattamelata (meaning "Honeyed Cat"), was an Italian condottiero of the Renaissance. He was born in Narni, and served a number of Italian city-states: he began with Braccio da Montone, served the Papal States and Florence, as well as the Republic of Venice in 1434 in the battles with the Visconti of Milan.

He was the subject of Donatello's equestrian bronze sculpture in Piazza del Santo in Padua, the same city over which he became podestà in 1437.

In Narni, the farmhouse in which Gattamelata was born bears a plaque reading "Narnia me genuit Gattamelata fui" ("I was born in Narni, I was Gattamelata").

== Biography ==
Erasmo of Narni was born in Narni, in Umbria, into a poor family. His station in life led him to the military, initially under the Assisi lord Cecchino Broglia. Later, together with his friend Brandolino Brandolini, he served under Braccio da Montone, one of the leading Italian condottieri of the 15th century, lord of Perugia from 1416.

With Braccio, he participated in the conquest of Todi, Rieti, Narni, Terni and Spoleto, and, in 1419, in the battle of Viterbo against Muzio Attendolo. At the War of L'Aquila (June 1424), Braccio's army was utterly defeated, and the condottiero himself killed; Erasmo led the remaining troops into the service of the Republic of Florence. In 1427 Pope Martin V hired him to regain the lands captured by Braccio da Montone. Città di Castello fell in 1428, but Erasmo had moved to the northern Papal States to counter the rebellion of Imola, Forlì and Bologna. He entered the latter in 1431 as the General Captain of the Papal States, and he also suppressed Antonio Ordelaffi's rebellion in Forlì.

Mostly because of his discontent with late wages, Erasmo abandoned the Papal services in 1434. He was subsequently hired by the Republic of Venice. In the course of the war against the Filippo Maria Visconti of Milan, he defended Bologna and fought against Niccolò Piccinino. The latter defeated him at Castelbolognese on 28 August 1434, in a battle in which Gattamelata was wounded. After a series of clashes and counter-manoeuvers, often lost by the anti-Visconti league (Gattamelata's side), he successfully defended Brescia and Verona in 1438. For this he was granted the title of General Commander of the armies of the Republic of Venice. However, the following year the Venetians lost numerous cities, including Legnago, Soave and finally Verona itself. This defeat led to strong criticism of Gattamelata. The Venetian Republic then called on Francesco Sforza to fight alongside Gattamelata, and the two re-entered Verona on 9 July 1439.

In 1440, while mustering a flotilla on Lake Garda, Gattamelata was struck down by a cerebral haemorrhage. He never fully recovered, nor led further substantial military campaigns. He died at Padua in 1443.

== Personal life ==
Erasmo's daughter Polissena Romagnola married Tiberto Brandolini, the son of his best friend Brandolino Brandolini of Bagnacavallo, a descendant of the lords of Brandenburgh, and Giovanna dei Signori della Tela. Polissena and Tiberto had two sons Sigismondo and Leonello. Therefore, the counts of Brandolini d'Adda appear to be the only known descendants of Erasmo of Narni. On the 8th of February 1458, Sigismondo married Antonia, daughter of Annibale Bentivoglio. His second marriage was to Margherita Scotti, which showed that Sigismondo was a sufficiently important personality to be able to form an alliance with the most notable family in Piacenza.

== Sources ==
- Giovanna Baldissin Molli, Erasmo da Narni, Gattamelata, e Donatello: storia di una statua equestre; con l'edizione dell'inventario dei beni di Giovanni Antonio Gattamelata (1467) a cura di Giulia Foladore, Padua, 2011.
- Joachim Poeschke, Reiterbilder und Wertesymbolik in der Frührenaissance – Zum Gattamelata-Monument Donatellos, in: Joachim Poeschke, Thomas Weigel, Britta Kusch-Arnhold (eds.), Praemium Virtutis III – Reiterstandbilder von der Antike bis zum Klassizismus. Rhema-Verlag, Münster 2008. ISBN 978-3-930454-59-4.
- Raphael Beuing: Reiterbilder der Frührenaissance – Monument und Memoria. Rhema-Verlag, Münster 2010. ISBN 978-3-930454-88-4.
- Antonio Menniti Ippolito, "Erasmo da Narni (Gattamelata)", in Dizionario Biografico degli Italiani, XLIII, Rome 1993, pp. 46–52.
