= Niccolò Piccinino =

Italian condottiero (1386–1444)

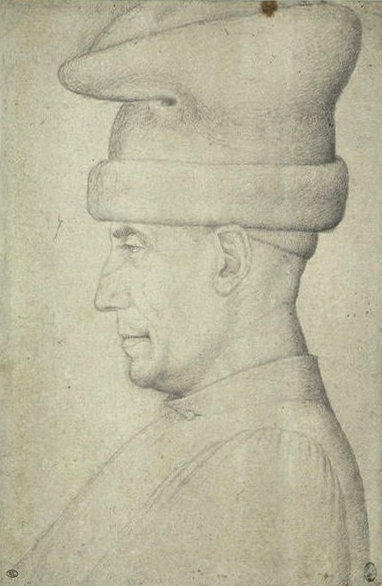
- 15th century portrait by Pisanello
- Born: 1386; Perugia, Papal States
- Died: 15 October 1444 (aged 57-58); Milan, Duchy of Milan
- Military career
- Allegiance: Republic of Florence; Duchy of Milan
- Service years: 1406-1444
- Conflicts: Battle of Sant'Egidio; Wars in Lombardy; Battle on the Po; Battle of Delebio; Battle of Anghiari

Niccolò Piccinino (1386 – 15 October 1444) was an Italian condottiero. He began his career in the mercenary company of Braccio da Montone, reaching the rank of commander of the company after Braccio’s death in 1424. He spent most of his career as a soldier of fortune in the service of The Duchy of Milan, fighting on their behalf in the Wars in Lombardy.

== Biography ==
He was born in Perugia, the son of a butcher. Piccinino was introduced in the guild of Perugia's butchers. He was later scornfully called "son of a butcher" by Pope Pius II. However, Piccinino's family actually owned a house with a nearby butchery, and were part of the landed middle class, and, according to tradition, one of his uncles had been podestà of Milan.

He began his military career in the service of Braccio da Montone, who at that time was waging war against Perugia on his own account, and at the death of his chief, shortly followed by that of the latter's son Oddo, Piccinino became leader of Braccio's condotta. After serving for a short period under the Florentine Republic, he went over to Filippo Maria Visconti, duke of Milan (1425), in whose service together with Niccolò Fortebraccio he fought in the Wars in Lombardy against the league of Pope Eugene IV, Venice and Florence.

After an outstanding victory over the Venetians at the battle of Delebio (19 November 1432), he defeated the papal forces at Castel Bolognese (1434). When another papal army under Francesco Sforza defeated and killed Fortebraccio at Fiordimonte, Piccinino was left in sole command of the Visconti army, and in a series of campaigns against Sforza, he seized a number of cities in Romagna by treachery.

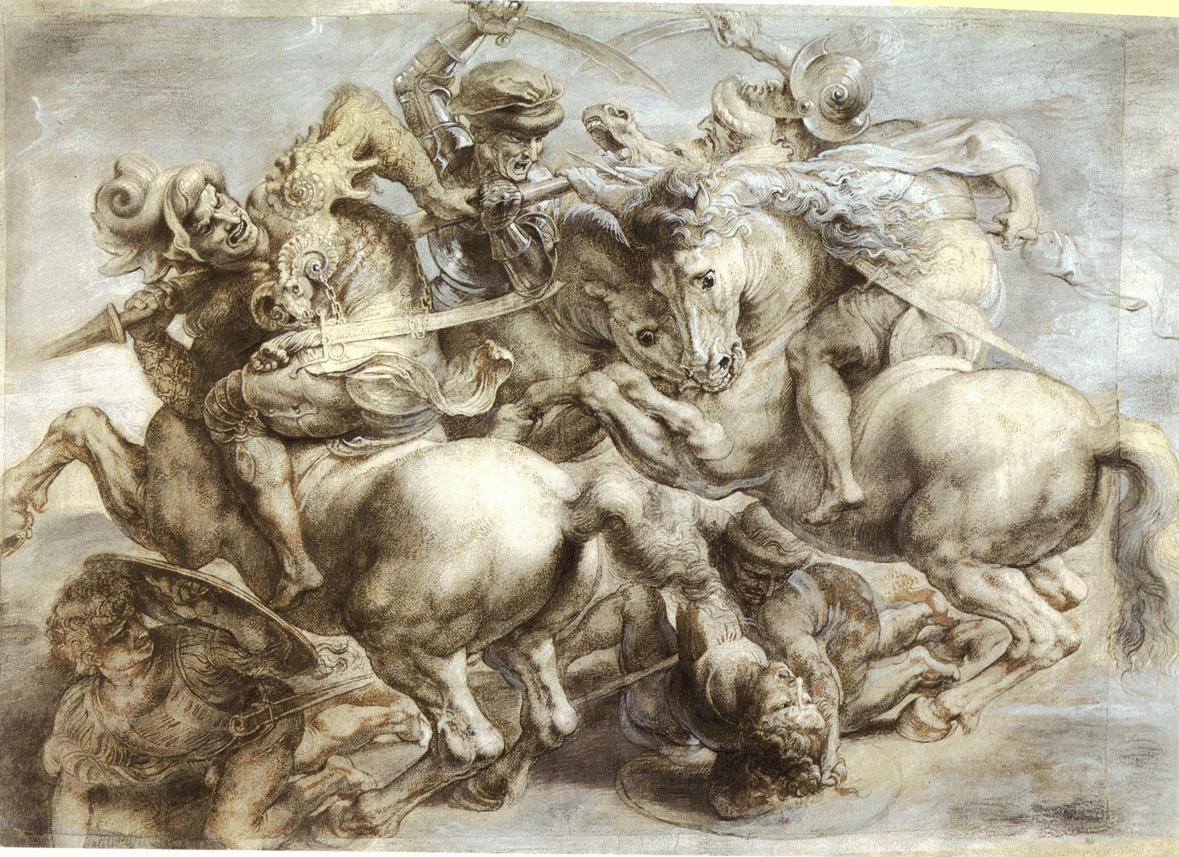
Peter Paul Rubens's copy of The Battle of Anghiari by Leonardo da Vinci. Allegedly Niccolò Piccinino is the horseman 2nd from left.

In 1438, during the war between Venice and Milan, Piccinino, fighting for Milan, tried to take the city of Brescia, but Scaramuccia da Forlì, fighting for Venice, intervened successfully to raise the siege. In 1439 Piccinino again fought in Lombardy with varying success against Sforza, who had now entered the Venetian service.

Piccinino then induced the duke of Milan to send him to Umbria, where he hoped, like so many other condottieri, to carve out a dominion for himself. He was defeated by Sforza at the Battle of Anghiari (1440), but although a number of his men were taken prisoner, they were liberated at once, as was usually done in wars waged by soldiers of fortune. Again the war shifted to Lombardy, and Piccinino, having defeated and surrounded Sforza at Martinengo, demanded of the Visconti the lordship of Piacenza as the price of Sforza's capture.

The duke by way of reply concluded a truce with Sforza; but the latter, who, while professing to defend the Papal States, had established his own power in the Marche, aroused the fears of the pope and the king of Naples, as well as of the Visconti, who gave the command of their joint forces to Piccinino. Sforza was driven from the Marche but defeated Piccinino at Montelauro, and while the latter was preparing for a desperate effort against Sforza he was suddenly recalled to Milan, his army was beaten in his absence, and he died of grief and of his wounds in 1444. Piccinino left two sons, Jacopo and Francesco, both condottieri.
