= Siege of Brescia (1438–1440) =

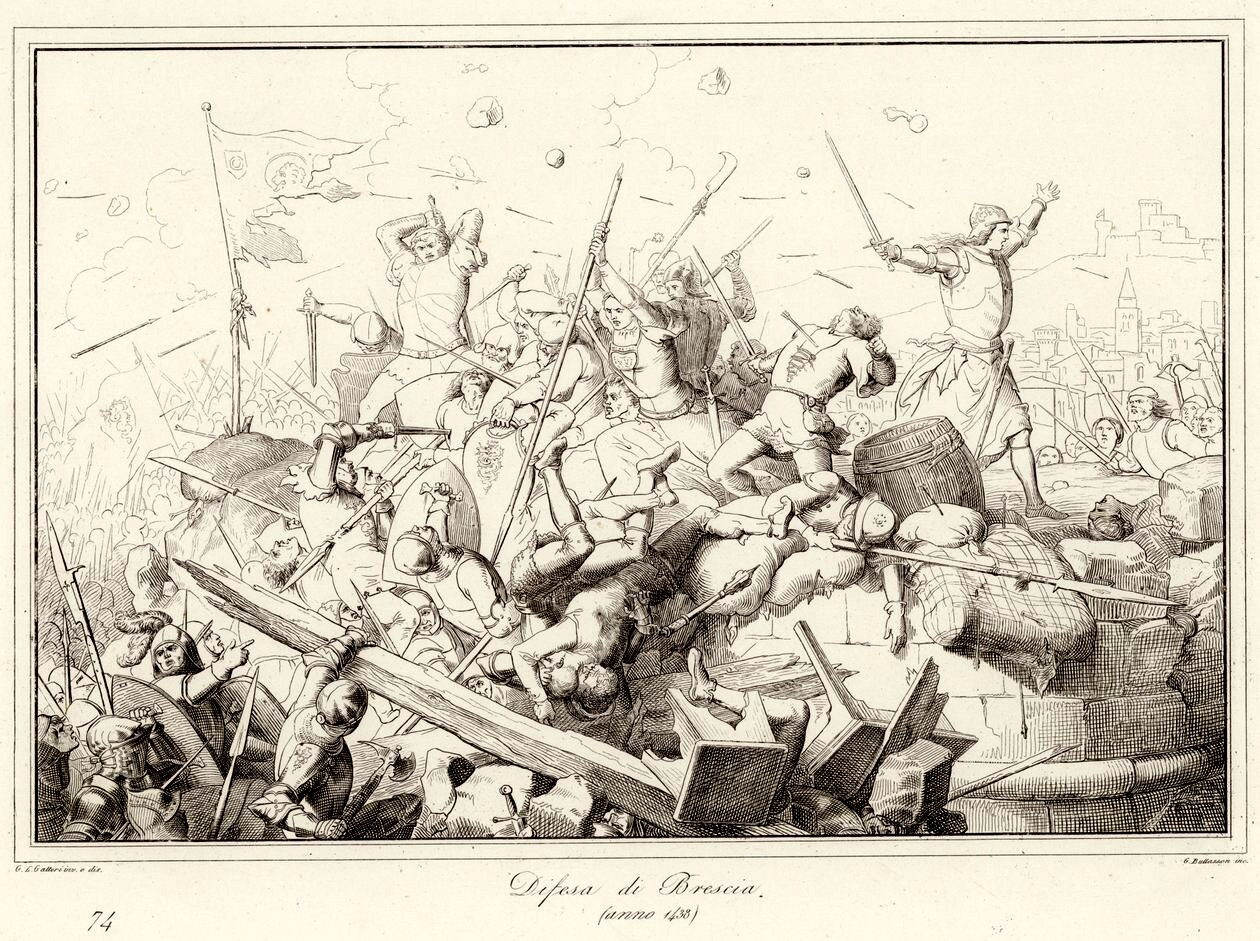
Scene from the defence of Brescia, by Giuseppe Lorenzo Gatteri

The siege of Brescia in 1438–1440 was an attempt by the Duchy of Milan to capture the city of Brescia, annexed in 1428 by the Republic of Venice, during the Wars in Lombardy. The long siege of Brescia was lifted after the Venetians successfully transported galleys overland into Lake Garda, overcoming the Milanese ships there. The successful defence of Brescia helped Venice preserve its recently acquired mainland dominions in the face of Milanese expansion.

== Sources ==
- Lane, Frederic Chapin (1973). Venice, A Maritime Republic. Baltimore, Maryland: Johns Hopkins University Press. ISBN 0-8018-1445-6.
- Mallett, M. E.; Hale, J. R. (1984). The Military Organisation of a Renaissance State: Venice c. 1400 to 1617. Cambridge University Press. ISBN 978-0-521-24842-6.
- Romano, Dennis (2007). The Likeness of Venice: A Life of Doge Francesco Foscari. Yale University Press. ISBN 978-0-300-11202-3.
- Soranzo, Giovanni (1957). "L'ultima campagna del Gattamelata al servizio della Republica Veneta (luglio 1438 - gennaio 1440)". Archivio veneto. 5. 60/61: 79–114.
