= Annunciation (Uccello) =

c. 1425 painting by Paolo Uccello

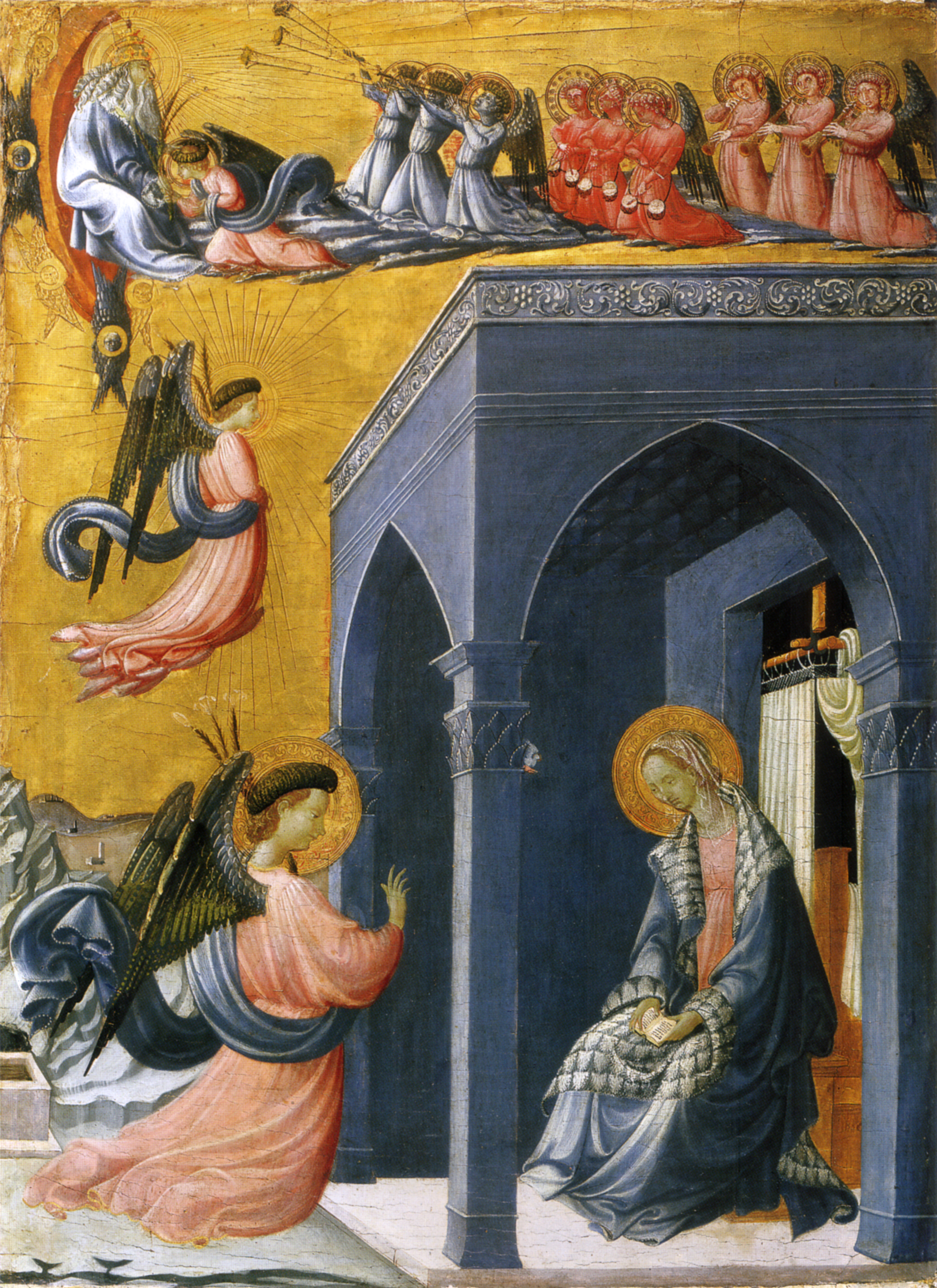
- Artist: Paolo Uccello
- Year: c. 1425
- Medium: Gold and tempera on panel
- Dimensions: 52.1 cm cm × 42.5 cm cm ( ×)
- Location: Ashmolean Museum, Oxford

Annunciation is a gold and tempera on panel painting by Paolo Uccello executed c. 1425. It is now in the Ashmolean Museum in Oxford, England, to which it was given by William Thomas Herner Fox-Strangways in 1850.

An 18th-century label on the reverse links the painting to Pesello and gives it the catalogue number 22. Van Male attributed to the Master of the Castello Nativity in 1929, but three years later Bernard Berenson instead attributed it to Pietro di Giovanni d'Ambrogio from Siena. In 1938 Mario Salmi attributed it to Dello Delli, while in 1975 Parronchi argued it was an early work by Alesso Baldovinetti. Georg Pudelko and John Pope-Hennessy first noted Uccello's strong influence on the work in 1935 and 1939 respectively by comparison with his Saint George (now in Melbourne). However, it took until 1980 for Carlo Volpe to prove conclusively that it was an early work by Uccello by comparison with his Beccuto Madonna, although in 2002 Boskovits argued it came slightly later in Uccello's career, possibly the mid-1420s and his stay in Venice.
