= Palais Lanckoroński =

Palace in Vienna, Austria

Coordinates: 48°11′21″N 16°23′00″E

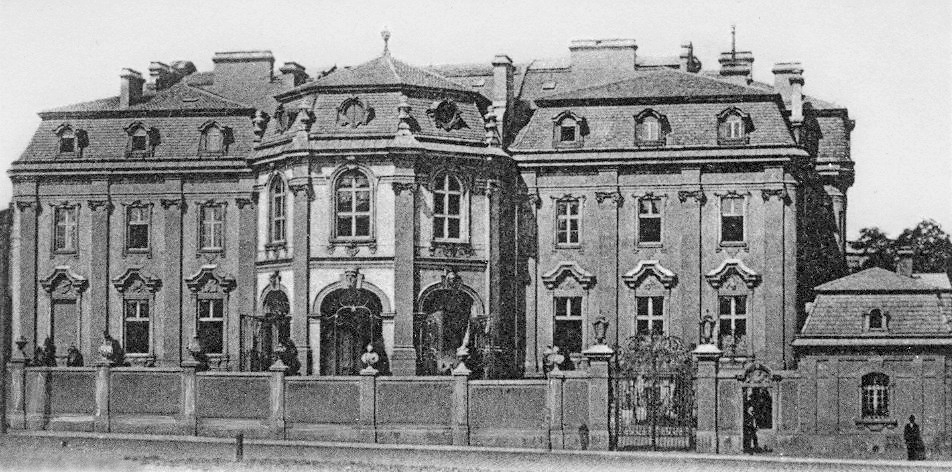
Palais Lanckoroński as seen from the street in 1895.

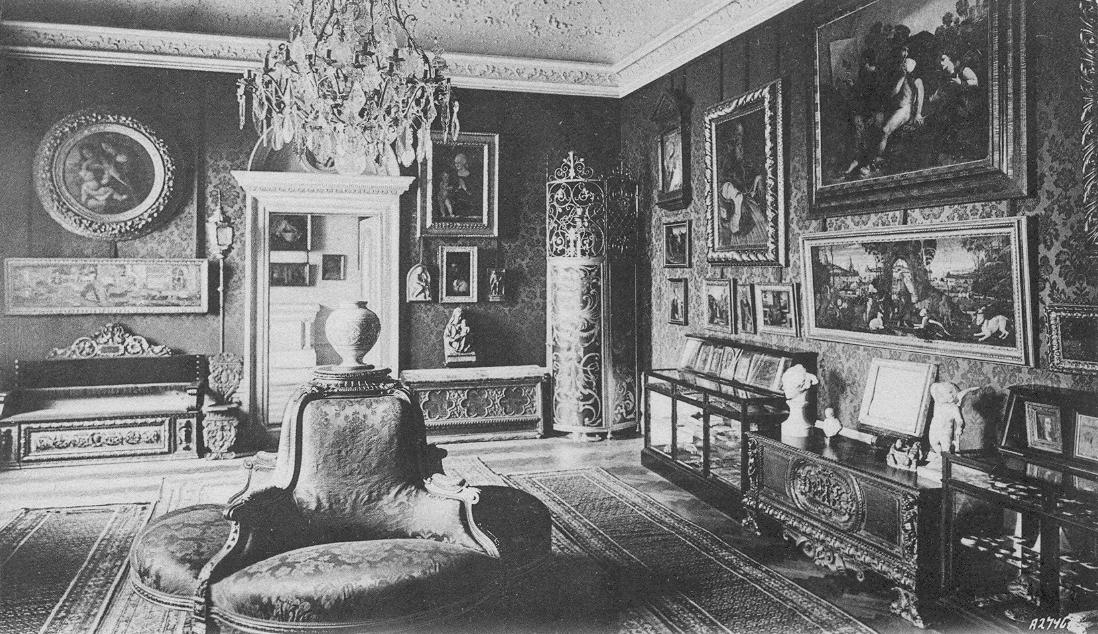
The Italian Salon.

The Palais Lanckoroński was a palace in Vienna, Austria, located at Jacquingasse 16-18, in the Landstraße District. It was constructed in 1894-95 for Count Karol Lanckoroński and his family as a personal residence, and it housed the count's enormous art collection. The palace was built in a neo-baroque style by the theatre architects Ferdinand Fellner and Hermann Helmer. The building was three stories high, set back from the street, and protected by a wall with double gates. The entrance hall was wood panelled, two stories high, and decorated with portraits of the family. Other festive halls were decorated with frescoes and luxurious gobelin tapestries from the 17th century. Precious paintings, furniture and sculpture from different eras were arranged to form themed ensembles in the various rooms, with the rooms named to reflect the collection housed within. The palace was severely damaged in World War II, and was torn down in the 1960s.

== History ==
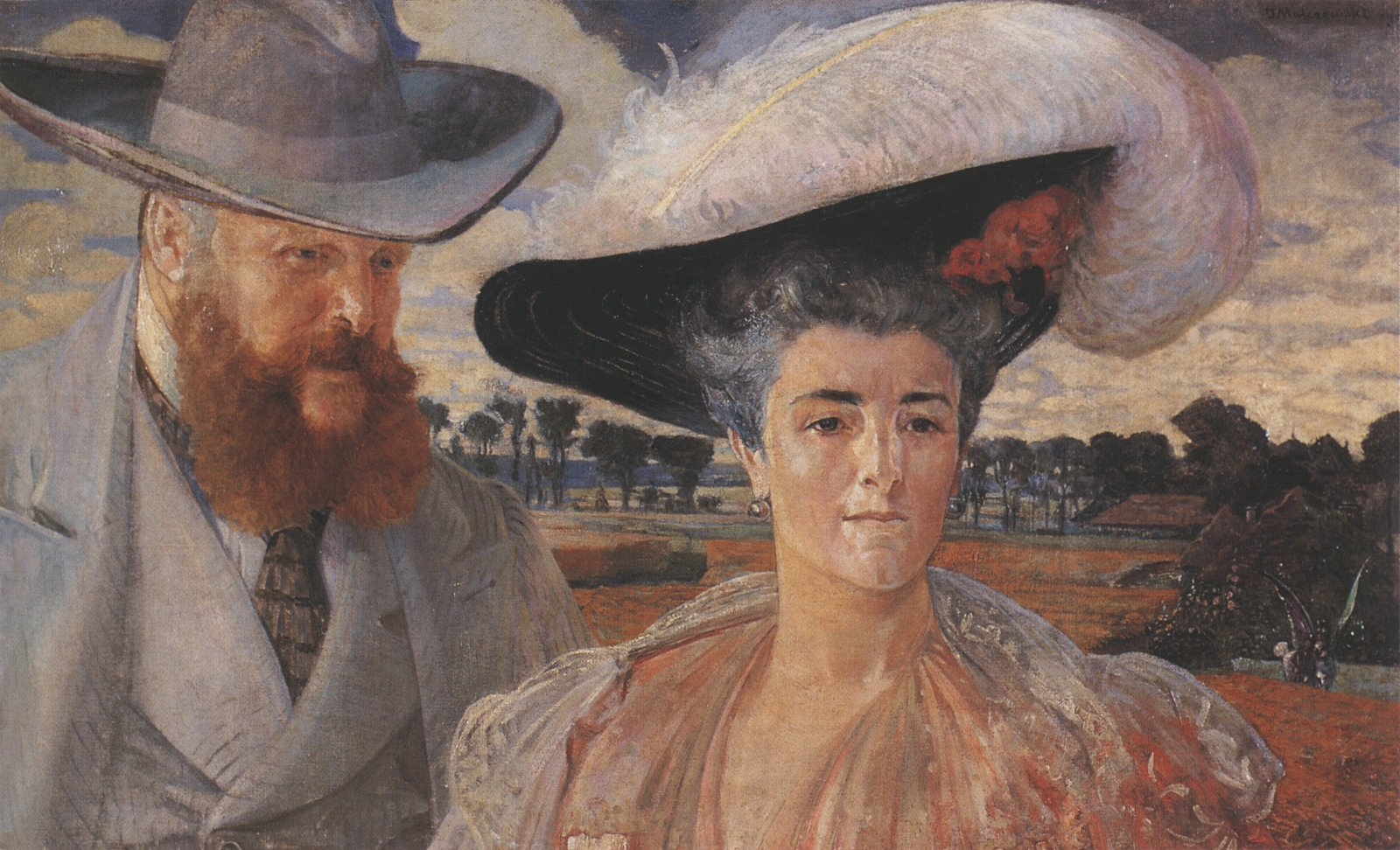
Portrait of Count Karol Lanckoroński and his wife Małgorzata.

The noble Lanckoroński family, aristocrats originally from Poland, assembled a major art collection through the generations, including Italian Renaissance paintings as well as German, French, and Dutch pictures, antique sculptures, bronzes, glass miniatures and porcelain. Count Karol Lanckoroński continued his family’s interest in the collection. He was a collector, archaeologist, art patron, author and conservator and also served as chamberlain to emperor Franz Joseph I. His additions to the collection included antique sculptures, as well as paintings by Tintoretto, Canaletto and Rembrandt. The art collection in the Lanckoroński Palais became one of the largest in Vienna under his stewardship. Frequent visitors to the palace were the artists Hans Makart, Viktor Oskar Tilgner, Arnold Böcklin, Kaspar von Zumbusch and Auguste Rodin. Writers and authors such as Hugo von Hofmannsthal and Rainer Maria Rilke also paid visits. After the end of the Austro-Hungarian Empire, the Count decided to return to Poland and began to move a large part of his collection to the family’s ancestral estate in Galicia.

With the annexation of Austria to Nazi Germany in 1938, the Nazis confiscated the palace. Since the heir Count Anton Lanckoroński was a Polish citizen, he was treated under the new regulation "Regulation on treatment of assets of nationals of the former Polish State". The remaining art collection was confiscated in 1939 after the outbreak of war with Poland.

Adolf Hitler decreed that all works confiscated in Austria should remain within the country, although items purchased could be exported. This measure was introduced as a result of the acquisition by Reichsmarschall Hermann Göring of two paintings from the Lanckoroński collection. Göring kept the pictures despite an order from Hitler to return them; nevertheless, the decree prevented the loss of the majority of Austria's works of art beyond its borders.

Many art objects were brought to Schloss Hohenems in the state of Vorarlberg for safekeeping during World War II. Unfortunately most of the objects brought there fell victim to fire. Palais Lanckoroński itself was looted in the aftermath of the war and also suffered a fire. The palace was temporarily repaired, but then abandoned and fell into a state of disrepair. Financial costs for a renovation were deemed too high, so during the 1960s the palace was completely torn down, and a modern office block was built on the site for Hoffmann-La Roche. Today this office block serves as Austrian headquarter of Motorola. The surviving art collection is scattered among various museums and private collections.

== Lanckoroński Collection ==
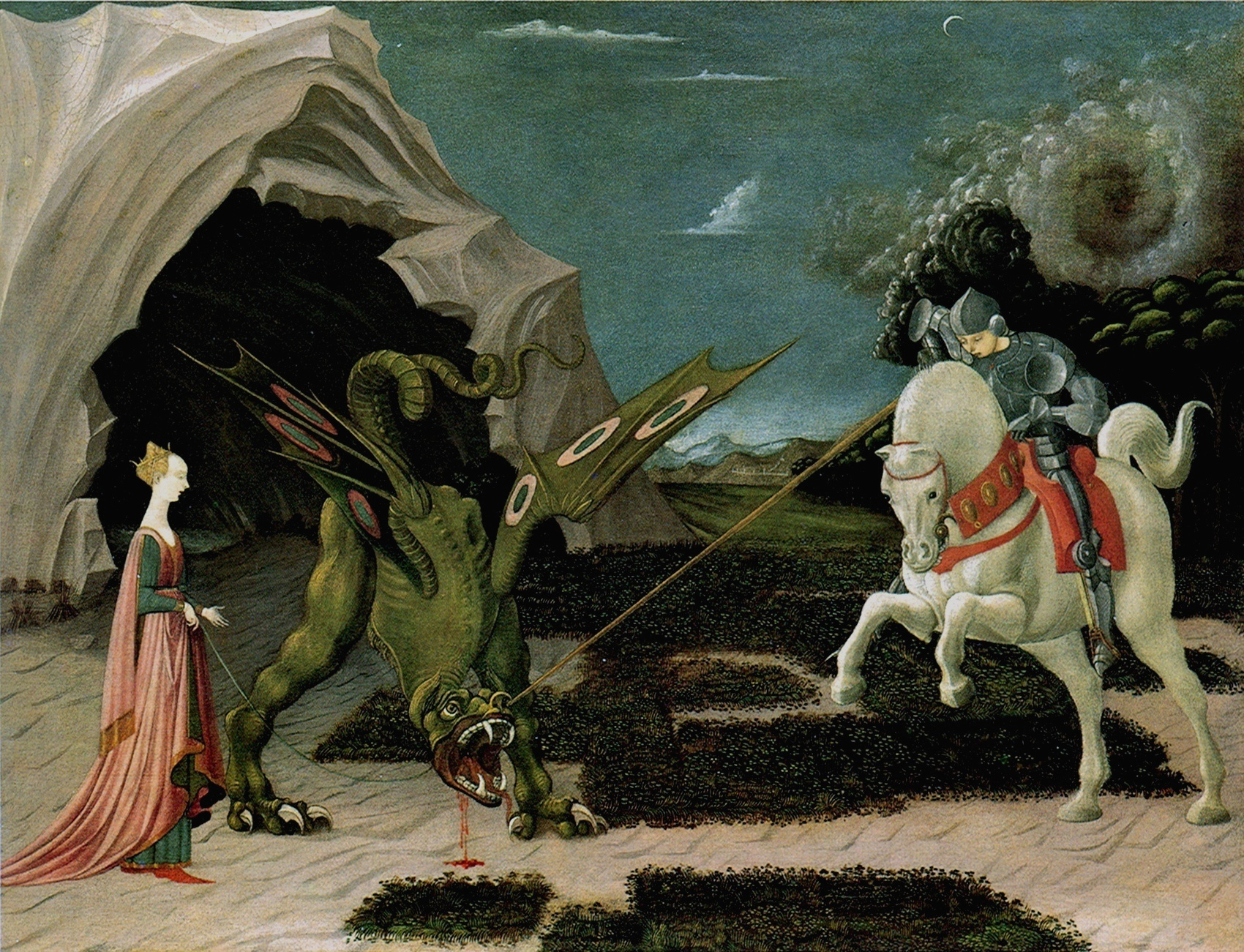
Saint George and the Dragon, by Paolo Uccello, today in the National Gallery, London.

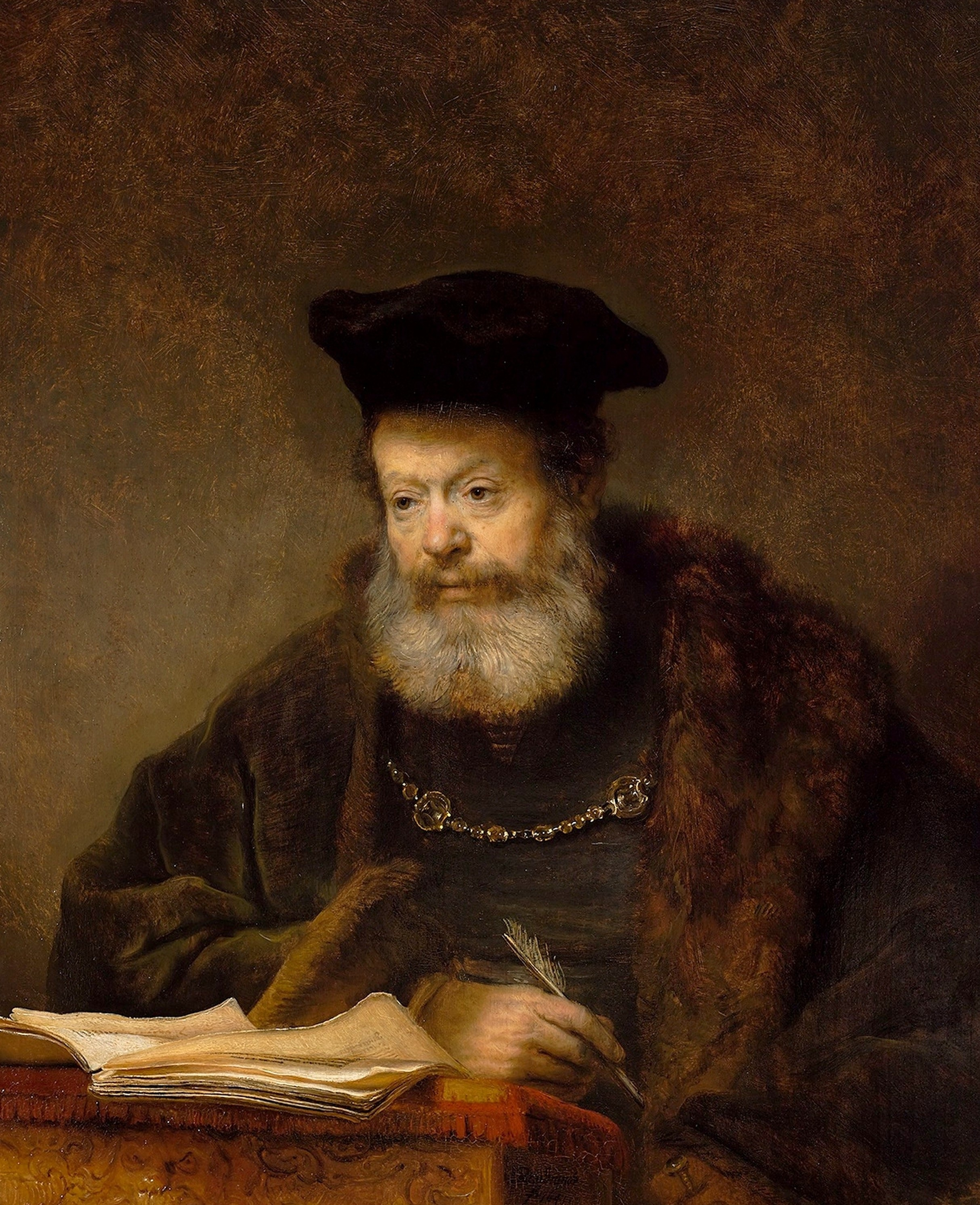
The Scholar at the Lectern (known as The Father of the Jewish Bride), by Rembrandt

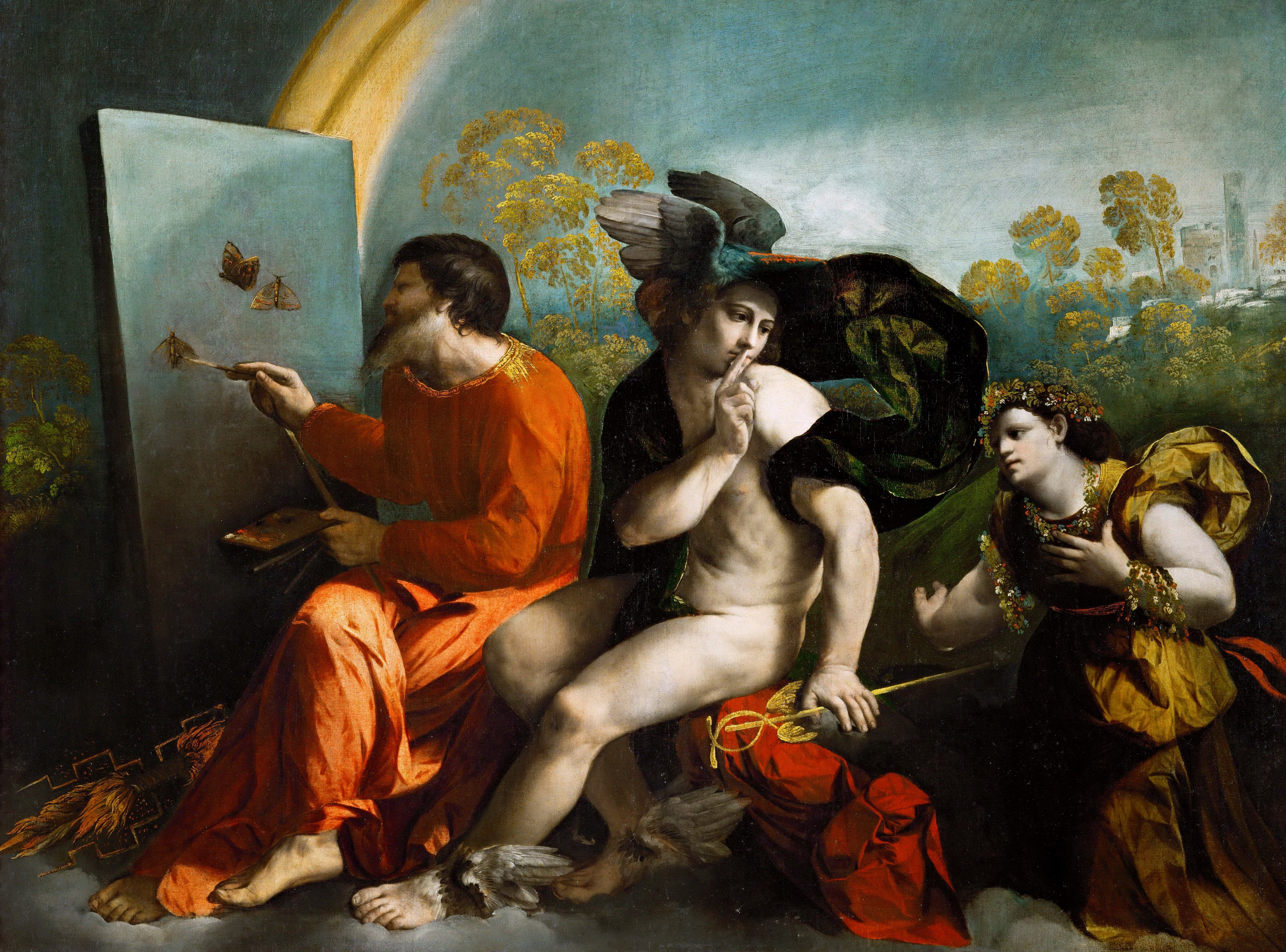
Jupiter, Mercury and Virtue, by Dosso Dossi

Many of the objects in the collection originally came from the Royal Castle in Warsaw. They consisted of a large number of paintings which hung in the "Gallery of Stanisław August", named after King Stanisław August Poniatowski. After the partition of Poland in 1795, many of the objects in the Royal Castle that were sold off were bought by Polish noble families, including the Lanckoroński. Other pieces acquired included sculptures, textiles, and silver-ware. The art objects that remained after World War II were sold by the three heirs to the National Gallery, London as well as the Kunsthistorisches Museum in Vienna. Some objects were also presented as a gift to Poland by Count Lanckoroński's youngest daughter Countess Karolina Lanckorońska in the 1990s. Items from the Lanckoroński collection can be seen in the Wawel Royal Castle in Kraków and the Royal Castle in Warsaw.

=== Paintings in the Royal Castle, Warsaw ===
Paintings from the collection formerly housed in Vienna, today in the Royal Castle in Warsaw, include:

- Adriaen van Ostade, The Smoker and the Drunkard
- Anton von Maron, The Brothers Franciszek and Kazimierz Rzewuski with Roman Buildings in the Background
- David Teniers the Younger, Country Doctor
- Rembrandt van Rijn, The Scholar at the Lectern (known as The Father of the Jewish Bride) and The Girl in a Picture Frame (known as The Jewish Bride),

other pieces are by Ludolph Backhuysen and Philips Wouwerman.

=== Paintings in the Wawel Royal Castle, Kraków ===
82 works from the Lanckoroński collection that were donated by the heiress Countess Karolina Lanckorońska are now in Kraków. These include works by Simone Martini, Bernard Daddi, Bartolo di Fredi, Apollonius di Giovanni, Jacopo del Sellaio, Vittore Crivella, Dosso Dossi, Garofalo.:

- Bartolo di Fredi, Saint Augustine
- Niccolo di Tommaso, Madonna and Child with Saints and Angels
- Simone Martini, Angel
- Bernardo Daddi, Enthroned Madonna and Child
- Sano di Pietro, Madonna
- Rossello di Jacopo Franchi, Madonna and Child
- Dosso Dossi, Jupiter, Mercury and Virtue (Donated by Dr. Anton Lanckoronski to the Kunsthistorisches Museum in Vienna. The piece was restituted to the heir in 2000, and then given to the Wawel Museum)

=== Paintings in the Österreichische Galerie ===
Pieces in the Österreichische Galerie Belvedere in Vienna include:

- Heinrich Angeli, Margarethe Gräfin Lanckoronska
- Carl von Blaas, Leonie Gräfin Lanckoronska, geb. Gräfin Potocka, mit ihrem Sohn Karl

=== Rudolf von Alt paintings ===
The realist painter Rudolf von Alt met Count Lanckoronski in Nuremberg on August 29, 1881. In the autumn of that year, he executed a series of ten interiors of the Count’s apartments. The paintings sometimes get confused as being interior depictions of the count's Palais at Jacquingasse. The paintings, however, are of his former residence at Riemergasse 8, in Vienna's Innere Stadt.

The watercolour series represent various rooms decorated with paintings and sculptures of the 17th and 18th century. In some, the Count can be seen sitting in one of the armchairs, reading a book. Using a refined technique, von Alt very precisely depicted all works of art, which are easy to identify. For example, the bust of Friedrich von Schiller, done by Johann Heinrich Dannecker, can be seen, as well as paintings by Thomas Gainsborough, Anton von Maron, Jacob Isaakszoon van Ruisdael, and Ferdinand Georg Waldmüller.

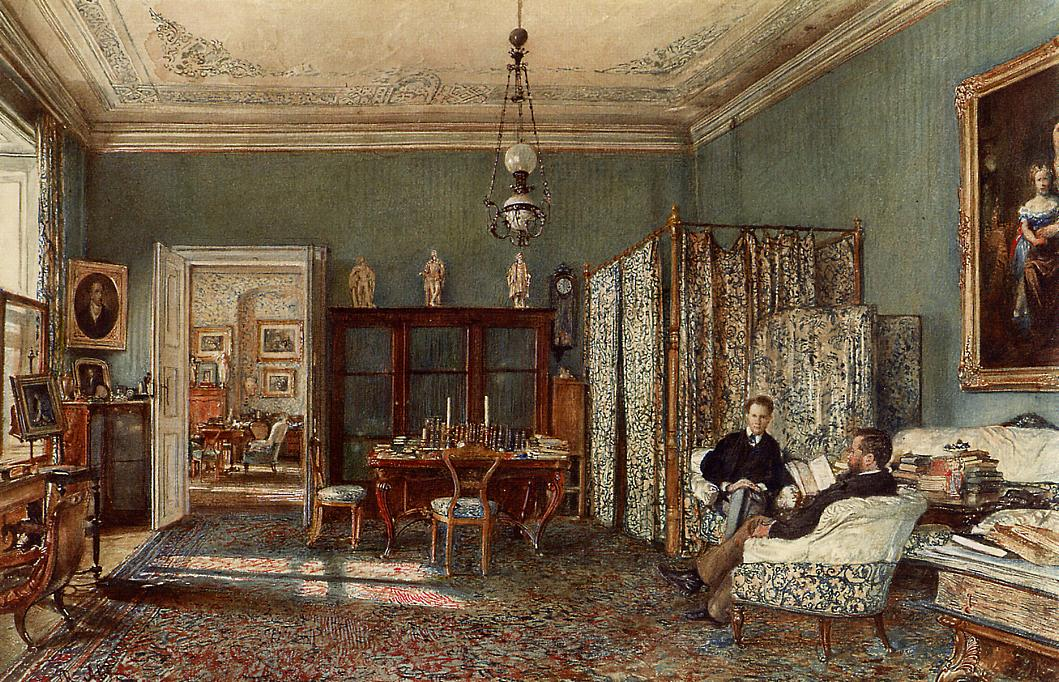
The morning room in the Lanckoronski apartments, painted by Rudolf von Alt

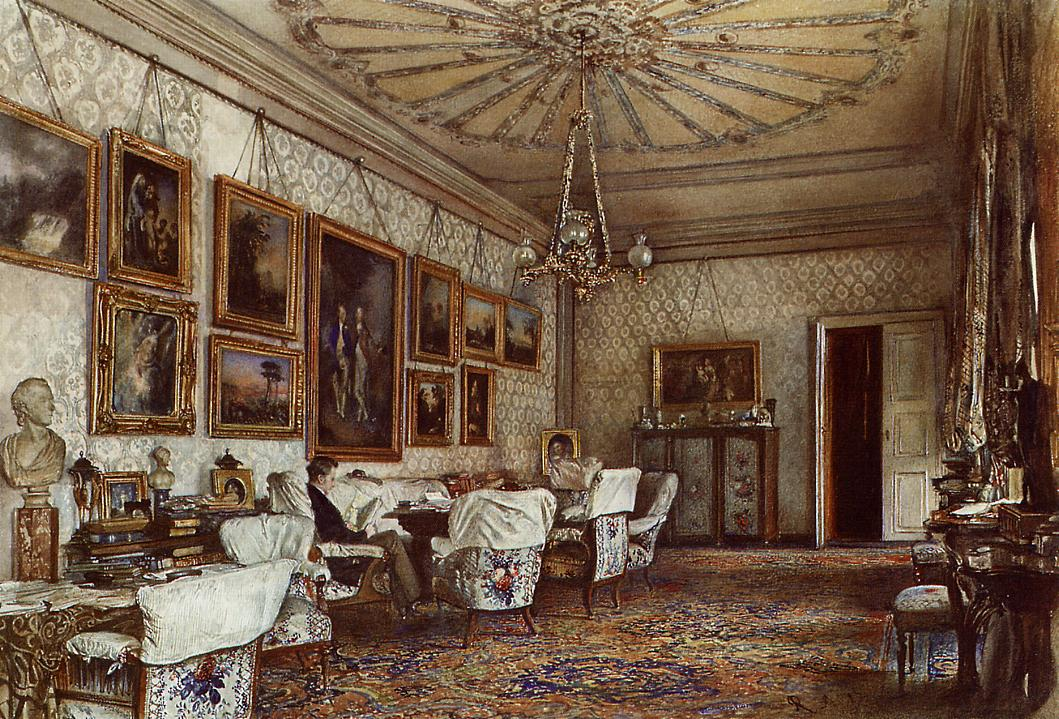
One of the drawing rooms

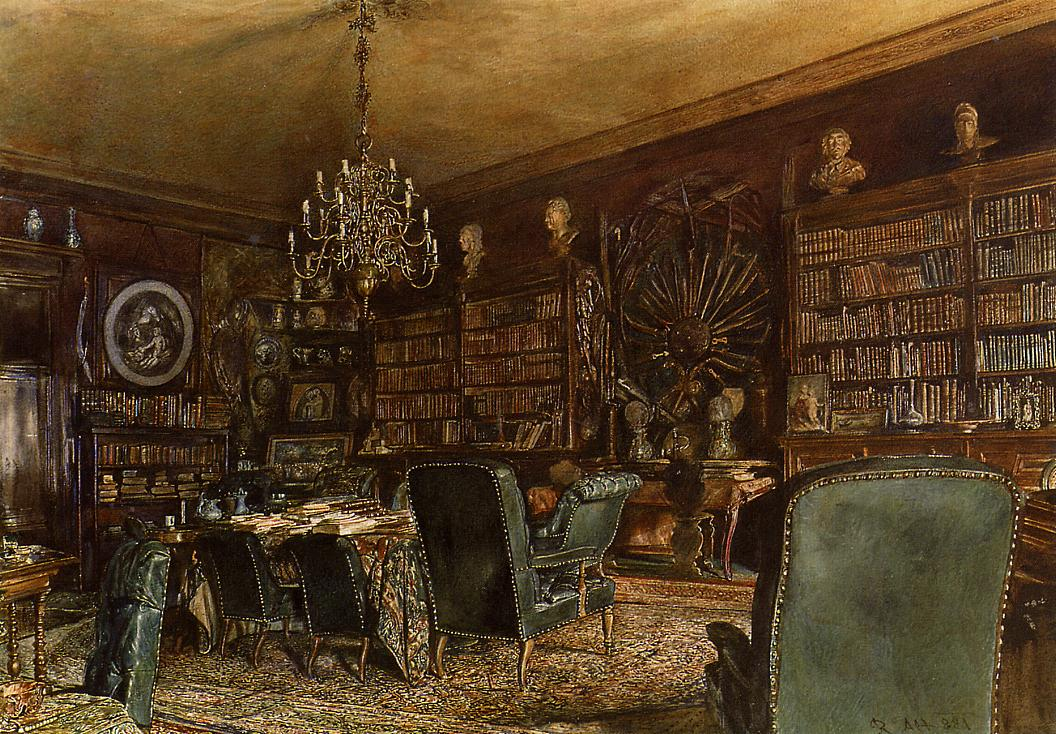
The library

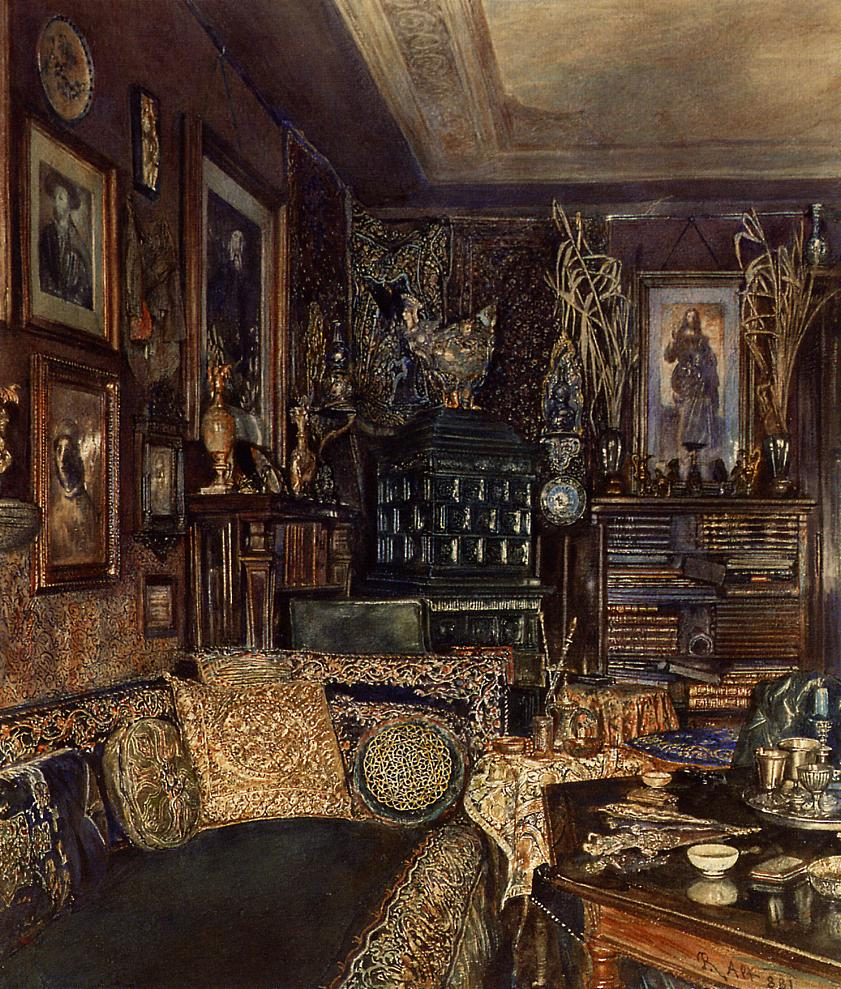
The office of the count

== Sources ==
- Mieczyslaw Paszkiewicz. Jacek Malczewski in Asia Minor and Rozdol: The Lanckoroński Foundation. Polish Library (1972). ASIN B00154PE5Q
- Karolina Lanckoronska. Those Who Trespass Against Us: One Woman's War Against the Nazis. Da Capo Press. 2007. ISBN 0-306-81537-0
