= Communion of the Apostles (Justus van Gent) =

Painting by Justus van Gent

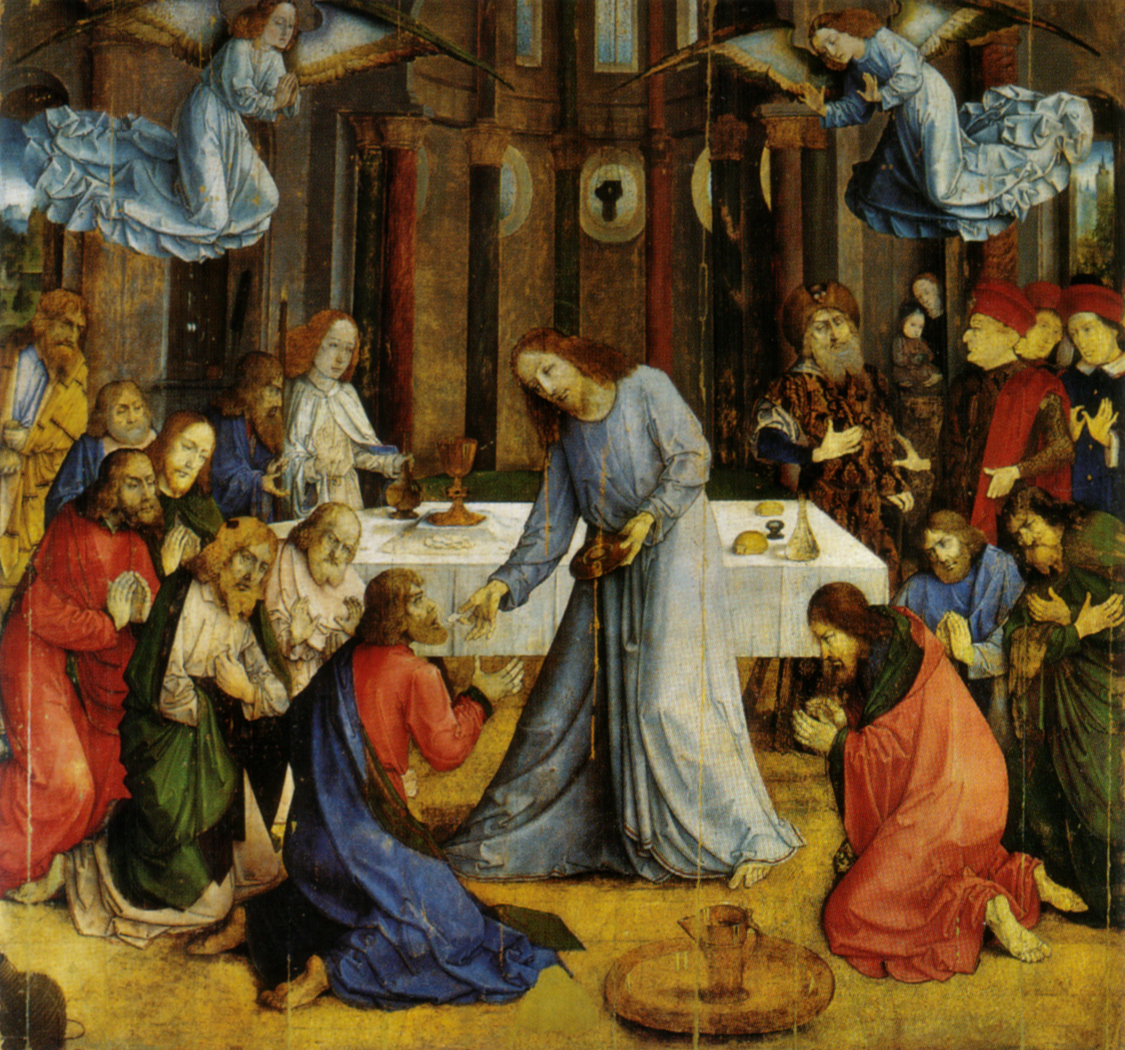
Communion of the Apostles (1472–\474) by Justus van Gent

The Institution of the Eucharist or Communion of the Apostles is a 1472–1474 tempera on panel painting by Justus van Gent. Commissioned as an altarpiece, it post-dates its 1460s predella, The Miracle of the Desecrated Host by Paolo Uccello. Both Institution and Miracle are now in the Galleria nazionale delle Marche in Urbino.

== History ==
The altarpiece as a whole was originally commissioned for the Urbino confraternity of the Corpus Domini from the local painter Fra Carnevale, but in 1456 he was released from his contract due to other commitments and asked to return the deposit of 40 gold ducats he had already received and spent on pigments, but this had still not been returned nine years later.

In 1467 the commission was transferred to Uccello, just arrived in Urbino and at that time not considered a top-ranking painter, perhaps due to his obsessive study of perspective. His pay was only 21 21 bolognini a month (compared to 18 bolognini for a pair of shoes at the time), from which the Confraternity deducted all expenses sustained by the artist. He completed the predella, but for unknown reasons had abandoned the commission by 1469, when it was instead offered in vain to Piero della Francesca (the first definite evidence for that artist's residence in Urbino) before passing to Justus van Gent, who completed the main work in 1474.

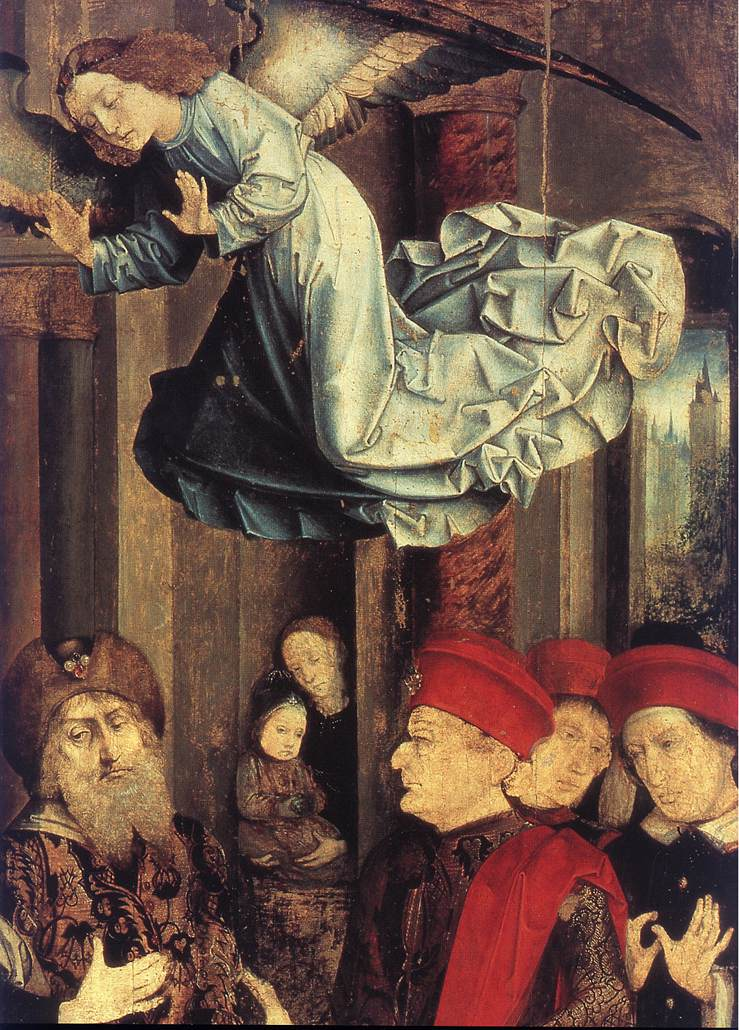
Detail with a portrait of Federico da Montefeltro
