= Saint George and the Dragon (Uccello) =

Painting by Paolo Uccello

- Artist: Paolo Uccello
- Year: c. 1470
- Medium: Tempera
- Dimensions: 55.6 cm × 74.2 cm (21.9 in × 29.2 in)
- Location: National Gallery, London

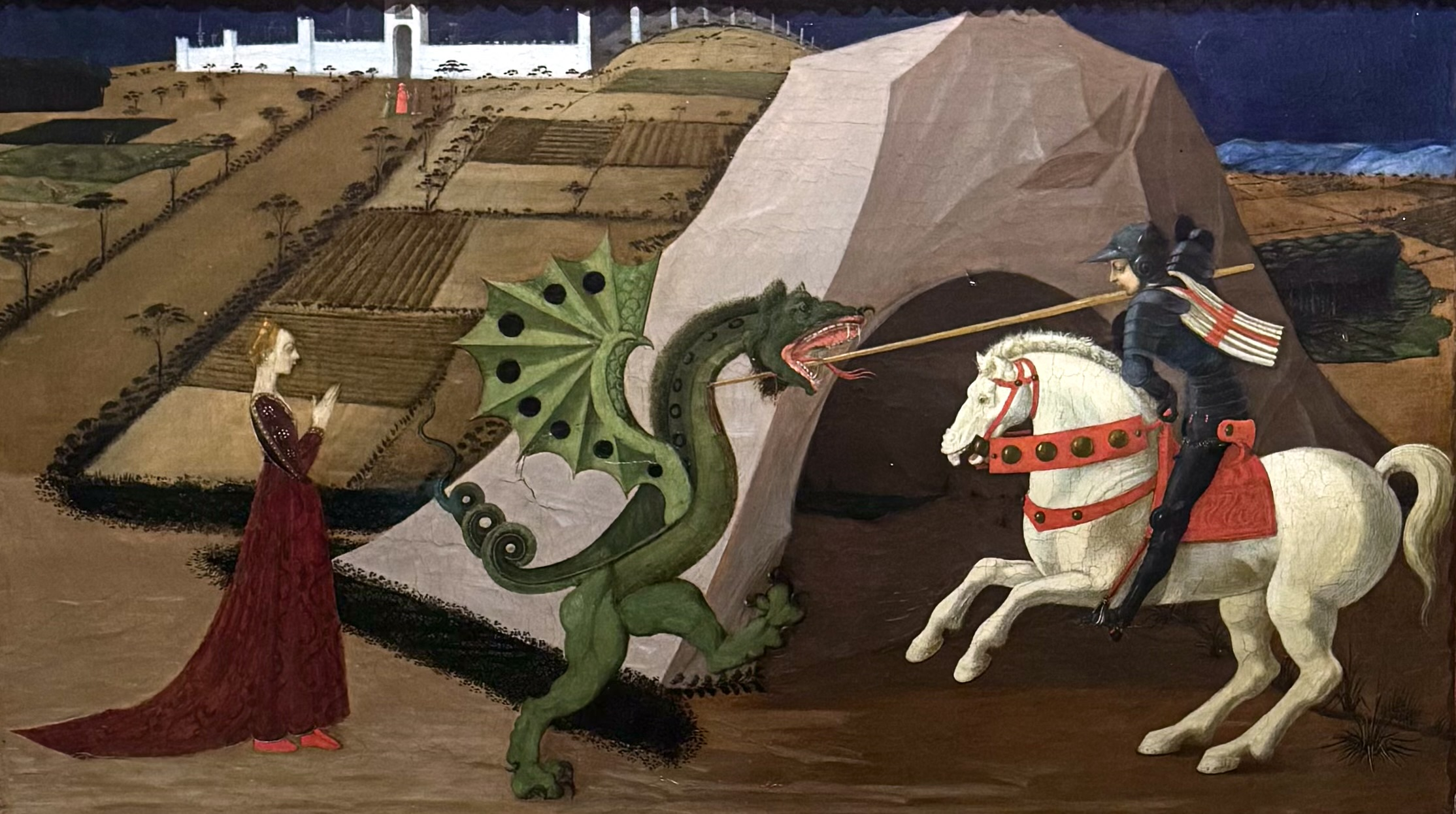
Saint George and the Dragon (1465), Musée Jacquemart-André, Paris

Saint George and the Dragon is a painting by Paolo Uccello dating from around 1470. It is on display in the National Gallery, London, United Kingdom. It was formerly housed in the Palais Lanckoroński in Vienna, belonging to Count Karol Lanckoroński and sold by his son and heir Anton in 1959 through Mr. Farago. The first mention of its being there is 1898.

Gothicizing tendencies in Paolo Uccello's art are nowhere more apparent than in this painting. It shows a scene from the famous story of Saint George and the Dragon. On the right, George is spearing the beast, and on the left, the princess is using her belt as a leash to take the dragon up to the town.

The eye in the storm gathering on the right of Saint George is lined up with his spear showing there has been divine intervention.

The painting is commonly interpreted as an illustration of the legend of St. George as recounted in the Golden Legend. However, Stanford professor Emanuele Lugli has suggested an alternative reading: that the work functions as propaganda, encouraging Florentine elites to adopt agriculture. According to him, the dragon was a symbol of pollution, and St. George's slaying of the creature can be seen as a metaphorical reclamation of the land, leading to a pure water source located in a cave.

An earlier, less dramatic version of the same subject by the Italian artist is in the Musée Jacquemart-André, Paris and an even earlier (c. 1430) is in the National Gallery of Victoria, Melbourne.

The painting is used as the basis for the U. A. Fanthorpe poem, Not My Best Side, and may have served as inspiration for Sir John Tenniel's illustration of the Jabberwock in Through the Looking-Glass, and What Alice Found There.
