= The Hunt in the Forest =

c. 1470 painting by Paolo Uccello

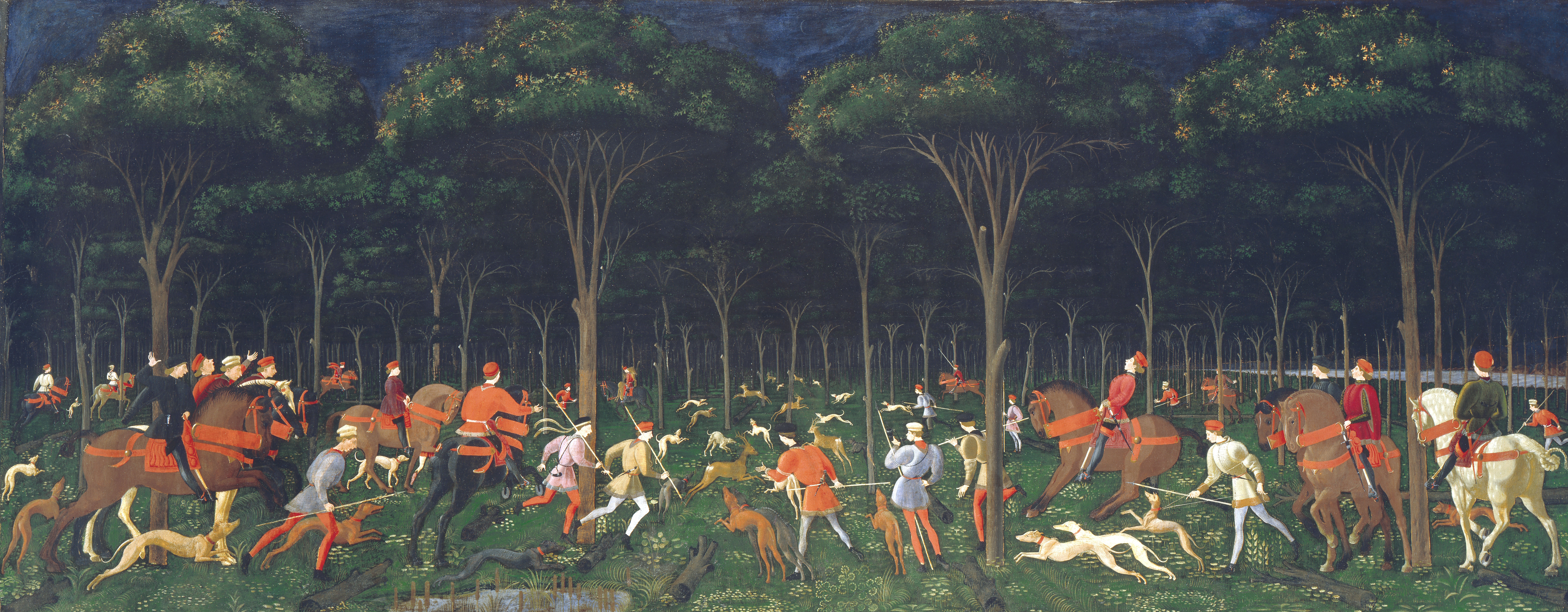
- Artist: Paolo Uccello
- Year: c. 1470
- Type: Tempera and oil on panel
- Dimensions: 65 cm × 165 cm (26 in × 65 in)
- Location: Ashmolean Museum, Oxford

The Hunt in the Forest (also known as The Hunt by Night or simply The Hunt) is a painting by the Italian artist Paolo Uccello, made around 1470. It is in the collection of the Ashmolean Museum, Oxford, England.

The painting is an example of linear perspective in Renaissance art, a mathematical system developed to create the appearance of depth on a flat surface. To do this, Uccello created a grid on the panel and diminished the scale of the figures, animals, and objects in relation to a central vanishing point.

Paolo Uccello was known for perspective work and his paintings of animals and landscapes. Due to this his nickname, Uccello('Bird') alludes to his depictions of the natural world. He was also known to be a versatile artist who also worked on mosaic or stained glass commissions.

The panel was probably part of a cassone, a painted chest associated with marriage in the Italian Renaissance.

It was Uccello's last known work before his death in 1475.

== In popular culture ==
Uccello's painting is featured in the "Point of Vanishing" episode of the British TV series, Lewis. A postcard of the painting is discovered as a clue to a murder. Lewis and his colleague visit the painting at the Ashmolean Museum on more than one occasion and are instructed on its significant features by a museum expert. The painting provides Lewis with an insight that allows him to solve the case.

John Fowles mentions the painting twice, in The Ebony Tower and The Collector: "...the design hits you the moment you see it. Apart from all the other technical things. You know it's faultless."

Brian Catling also mentions the painting in his 2017 novel The Erstwhile, describing a "hunt where men ran into darkness, sending dogs and spears darting lie violets into the vanishing point of flickering trees."

A Roblox game titled Frozen Soul/Dream Game used a part of this painting for a badge titled The World as an Idea.
