= Crucifixion (Uccello) =

c. 1457 painting by Paolo Uccello

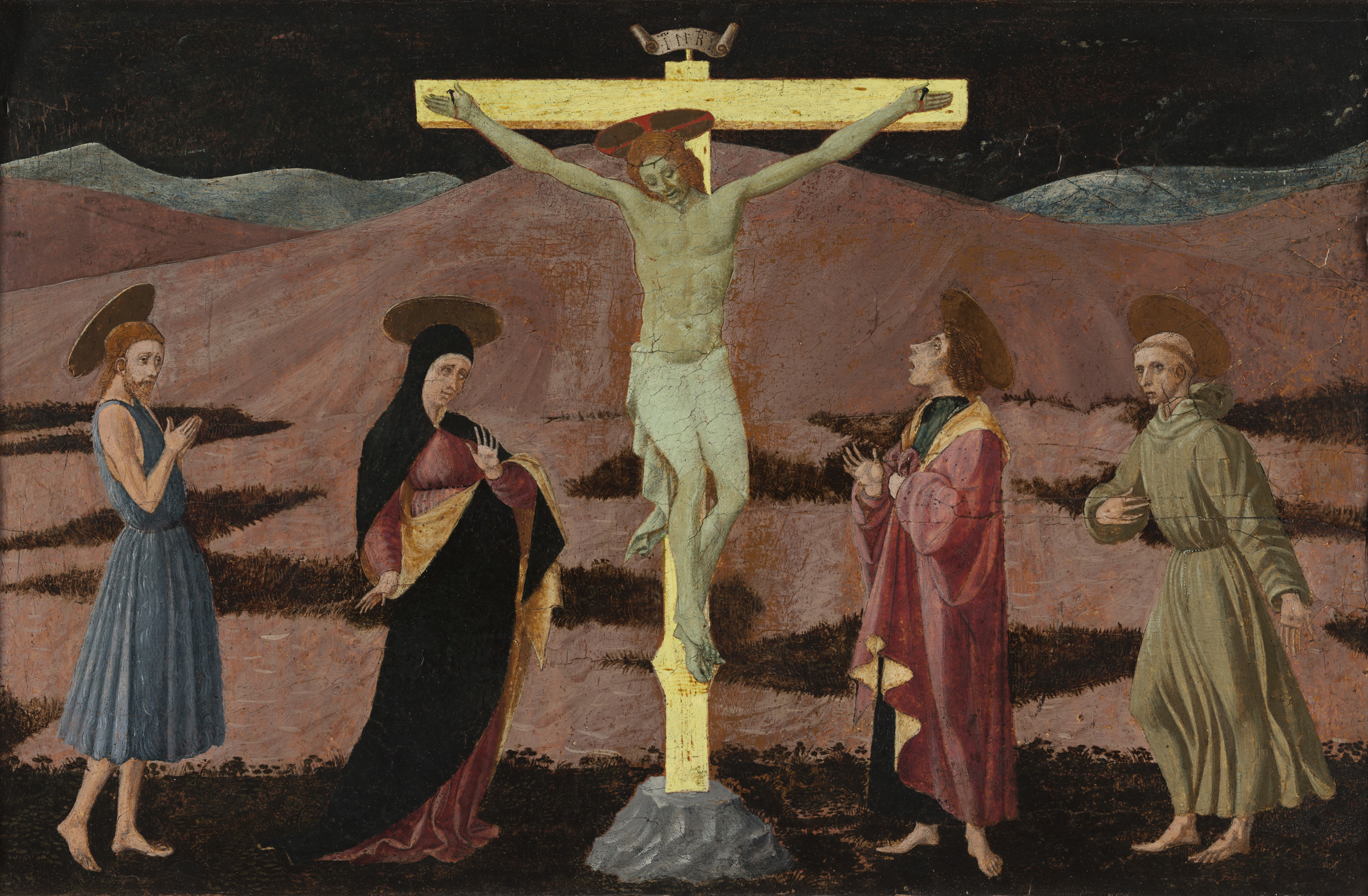
- Artist: Paolo Uccello
- Year: c. 1457-1458
- Medium: tempera on panel
- Dimensions: 46 cm × 67 cm (18 in × 26 in)
- Location: Museo Thyssen-Bornemisza, Madrid

Crucifixion is a c. 1457–1458 tempera painting on panel by Paolo Uccello, now in the Museo Thyssen-Bornemisza, in Madrid. Its dating is debated – some date it to the same period in the Cappella dell'Assunta (1435) due to the similarities between the pose of the Virgin Mary in Crucifixion and the woman climbing the stairs in the chapel fresco of The Birth of the Virgin, whilst others date it to a later period after his return to Padua, where he was influenced by the work of Donatello.
