= Crucifixion with Two Angels =

c. 1423 painting by Paolo Uccello

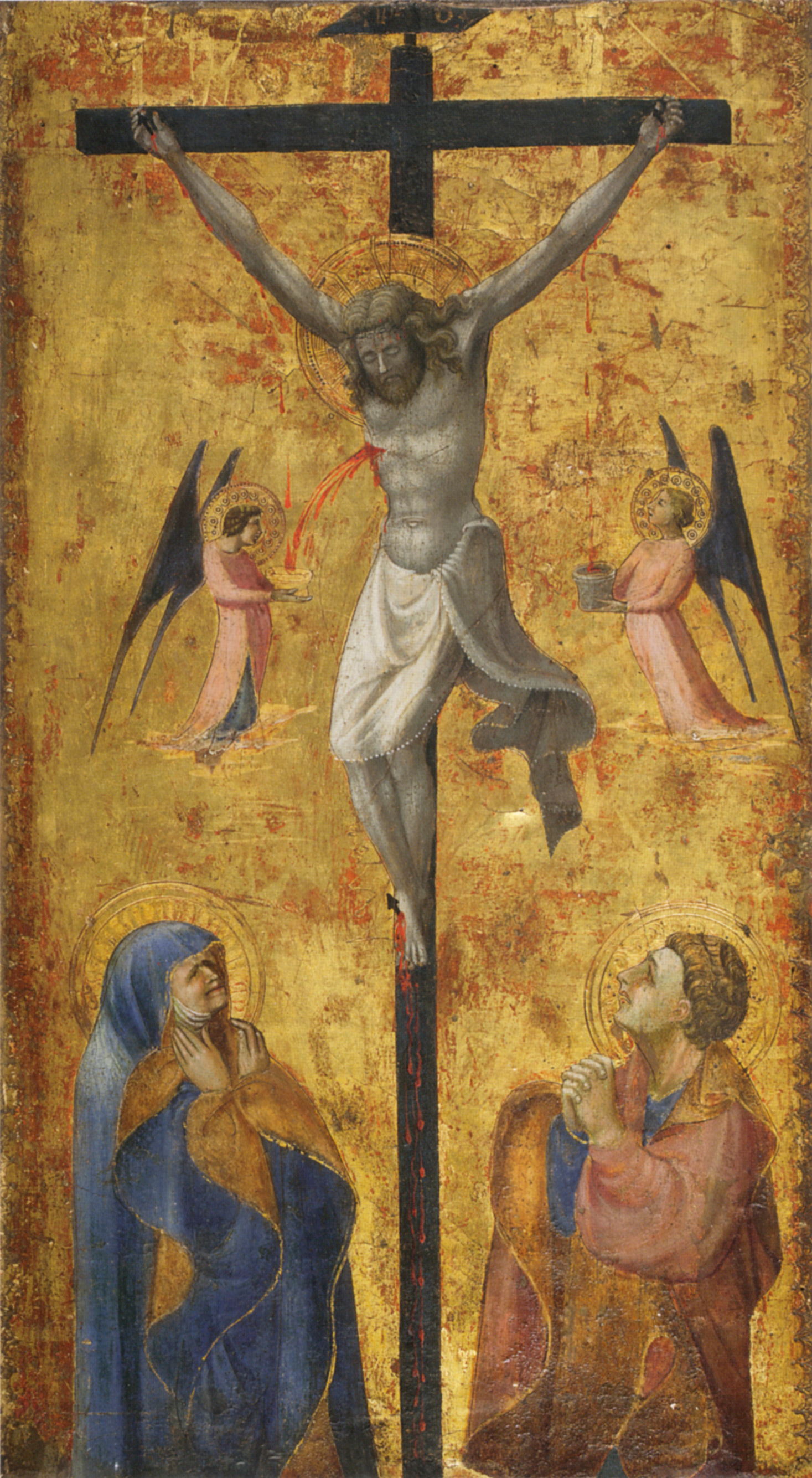
Crucifixion with Two Angels (c. 1423) by Paolo Uccello

Crucifixion with Two Angels is a tempera and gold on panel painting by Paolo Uccello, executed c. 1423. It now in a private collection.
