= Beccuto Madonna =

1420s fresco by Paolo Uccello

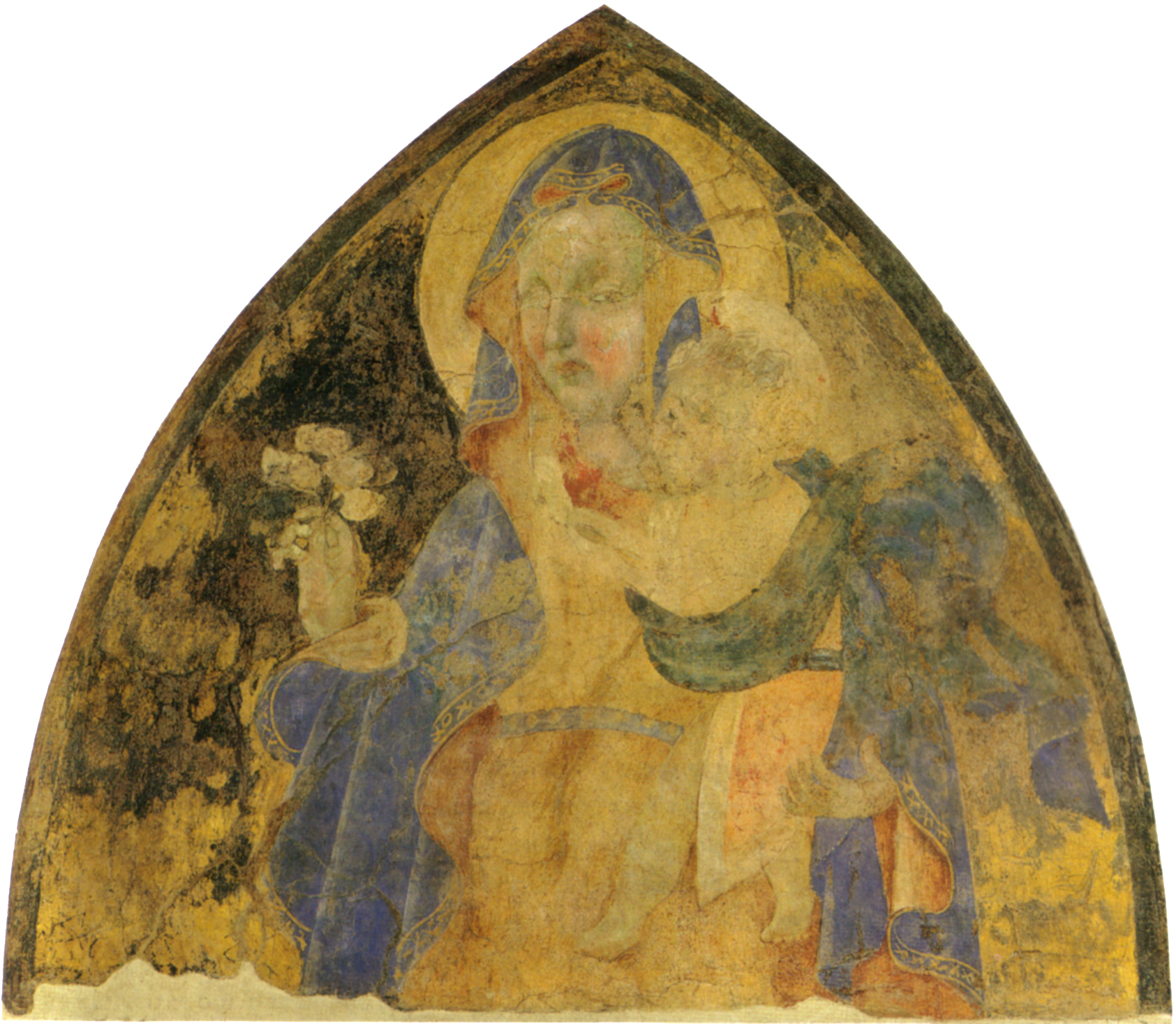
Beccuto Madonna (c. 1420–1425) by Paolo Uccello

Beccuto Madonna is a c.1420-1425 fresco fragment by Paolo Uccello, now in the Museo nazionale di San Marco in Florence, Italy.

It was originally sited in one of the Del Beccuto family's houses between Via dei Vecchietti and Via Teatina, not far from the Church of Santa Maria Maggiore. It was rediscovered during the building's demolition in 1894 to create the Piazza della Repubblica.
