= The Miracle of the Desecrated Host =

c. 1467 painting by Paolo Uccello

The Miracle of the Desecrated Host (Also known as The Miracle of the Profaned Host) (c. 1467-1469) by Paolo Uccello

The Miracle of the Desecrated Host (also known as The Miracle of the Profaned Host) is a six-panel tempera-on-panel predella by Paolo Uccello, painted between 1467 and 1469 for the Confraternity of the Corpus Domini and their oratory in the Corpus Domini church in Urbino. The predella was completed before van Wassenhove's work and Uccello received his last payment on 17 October 1469 (folio 37v) and the rules made by folio 38r (a total of 18 florins and 16 bolognini).

Uccello had also originally been commissioned to paint the altarpiece to which this predella would be attached, but that work was instead entrusted to Justus van Gent, who completed the main altarpiece Communion of the Apostles in 1474.

Measuring 42 cm by 361 cm, the predella was moved to Santa Agatha then to the Scolopi College. It was then lost until 1858, when it was rediscovered in a barn and moved to the Ducal Palace. It had probably been used as a masons' bench and had been damaged, with the colours altered by traces of lime. It was restored in 1954, revealing previous repainting and repairs. It is now in the Galleria Nazionale delle Marche in Urbino.

== Description ==
It shows a story of host desecration, possibly inspired by Bernardino of Siena's sermons, running from left to right and with each scene separated from the next by separately-painted half-balustrades. From left to right these show

1. a woman exchanges a host with a Jewish merchant for a mantle or a Jewish usurer for money
2. the Jew tries to burn the host, but it starts to bleed, alerting the guards
3. a procession is organised to re-consecrate the host
4. despite repenting, the woman is going to be hanged from a tree, however an angel descends from heaven to save her soul
5. the Jew and his family are burned at the stake
6. two angels and two devils argue over the woman's body
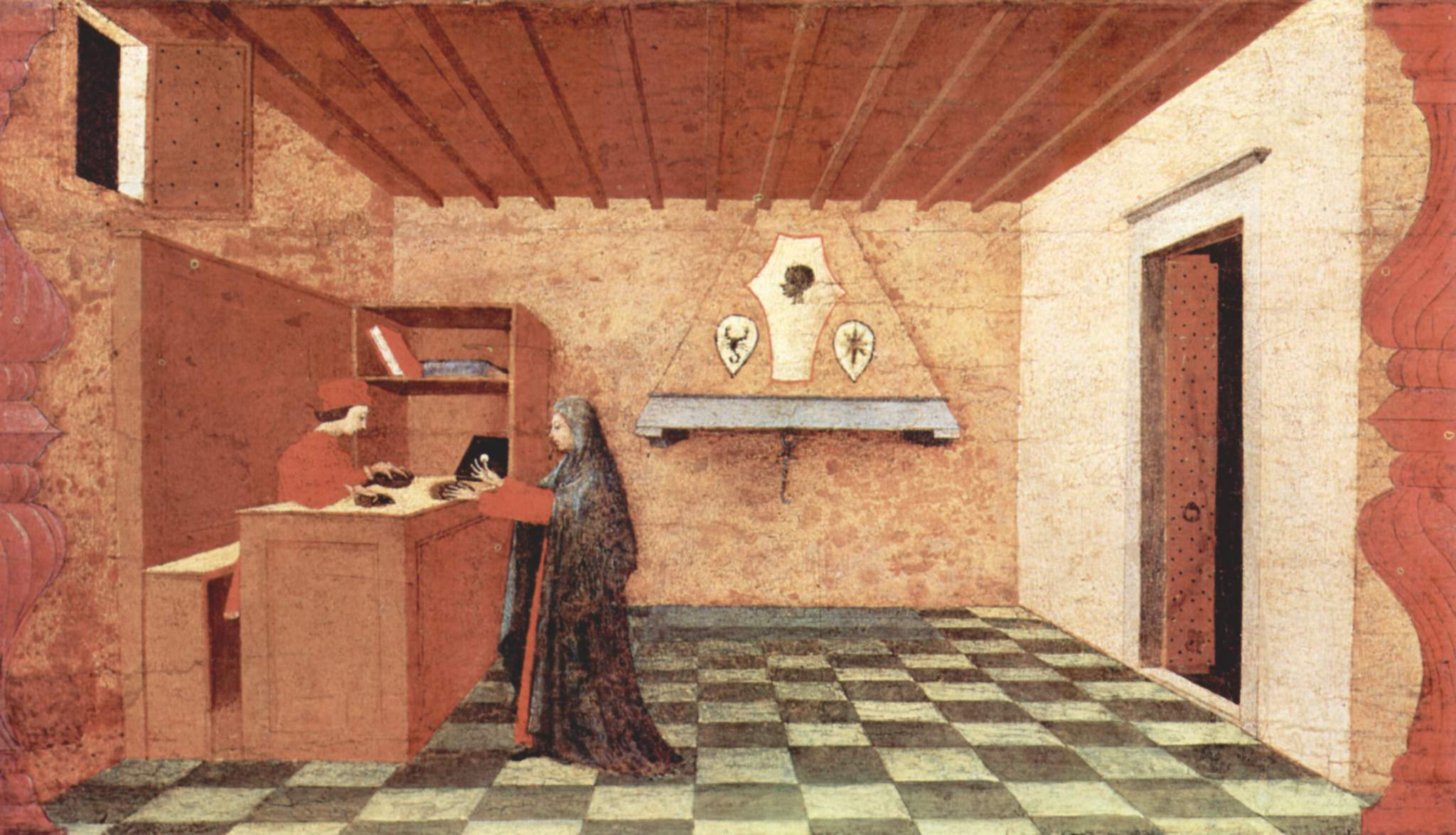
Scene 1

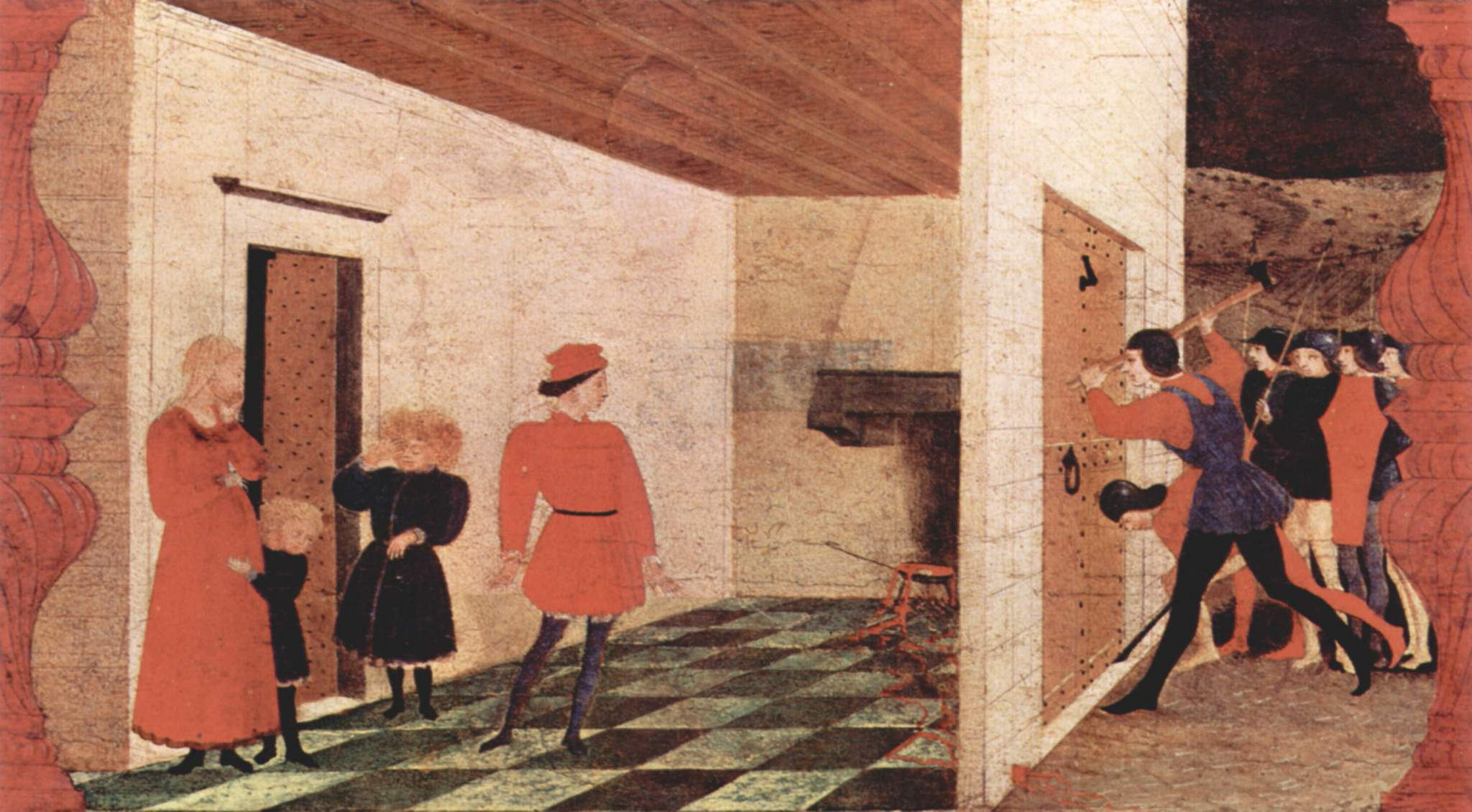
Scene 2

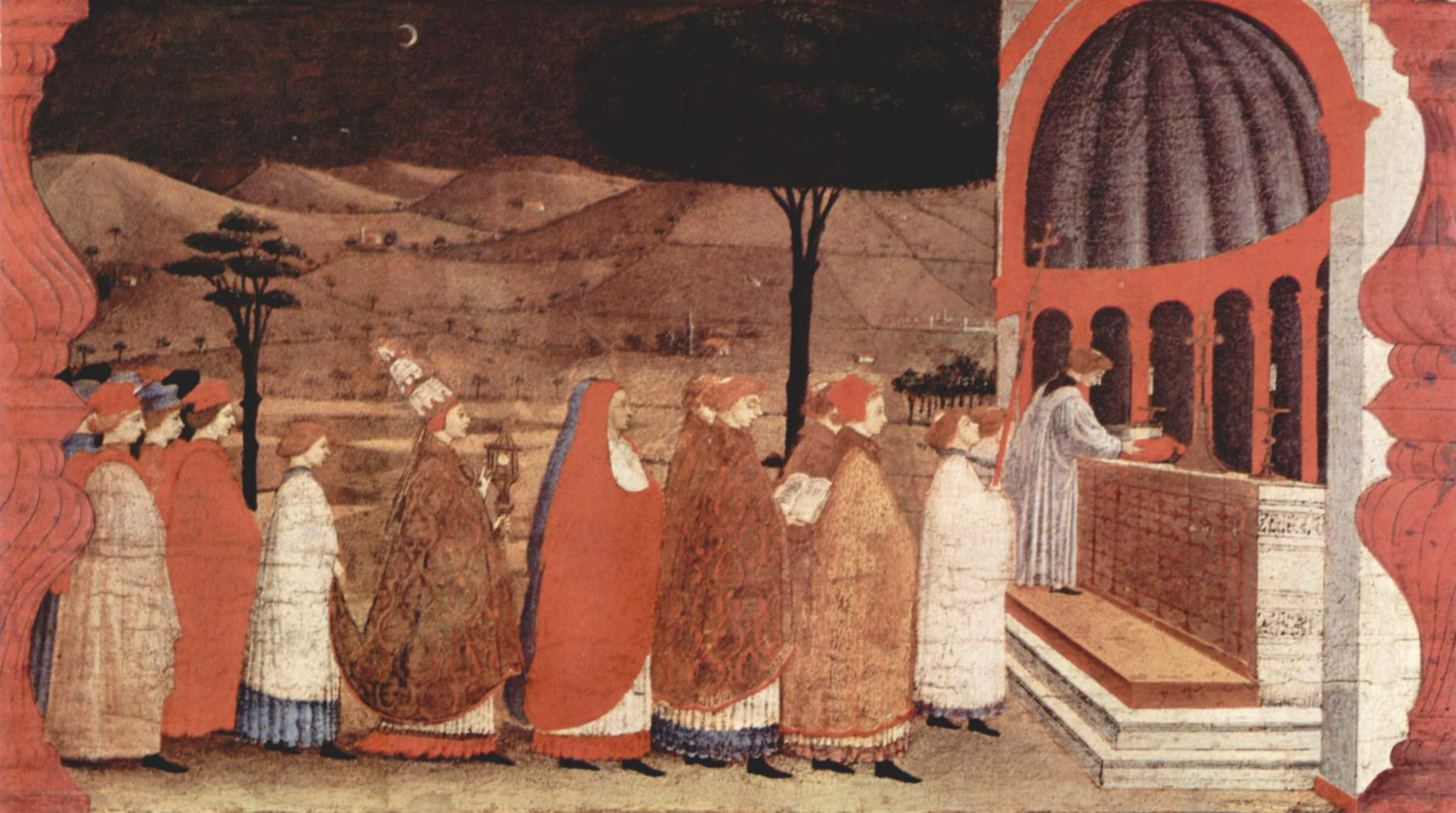
Scene 3

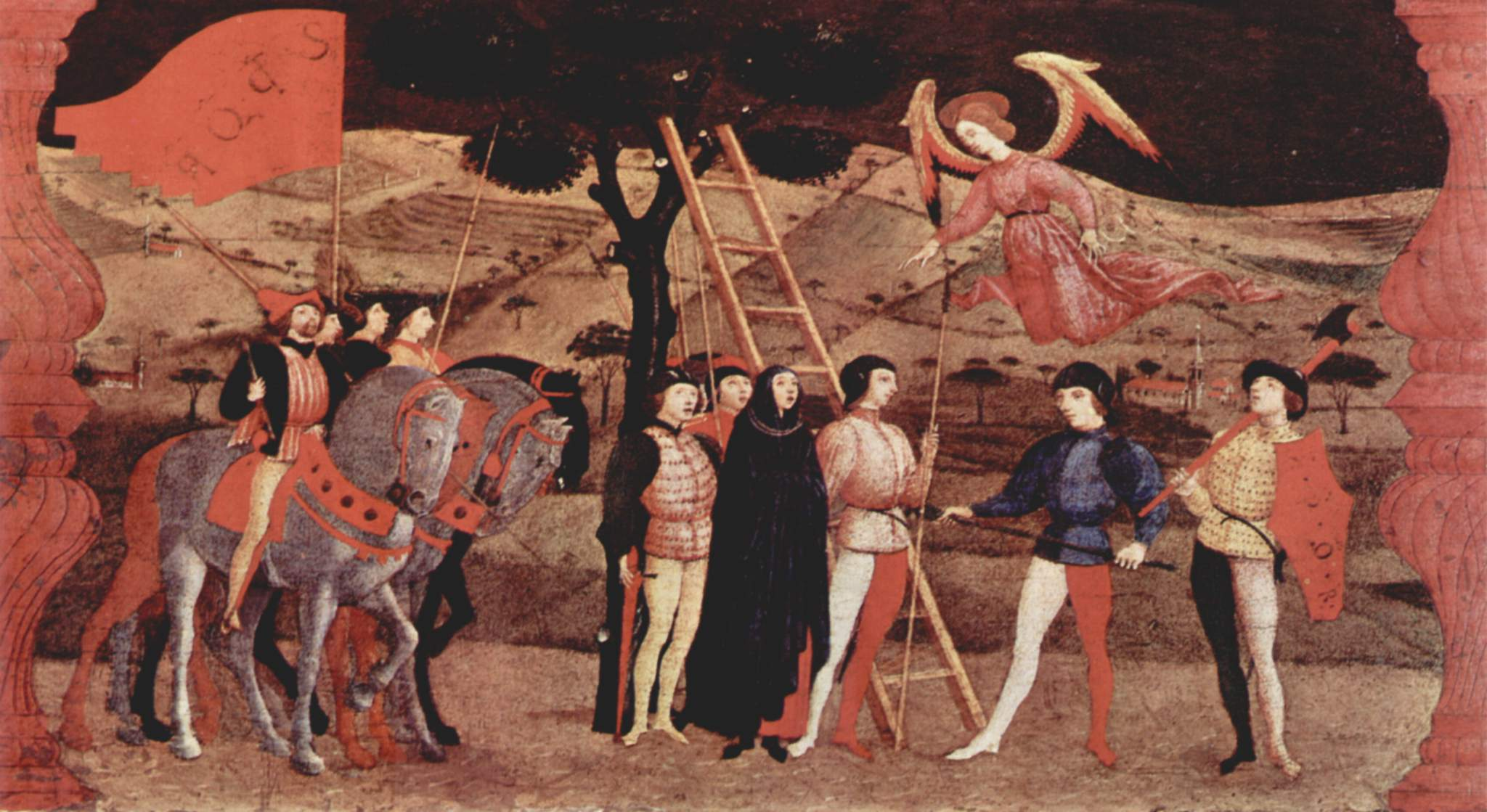
Scene 4

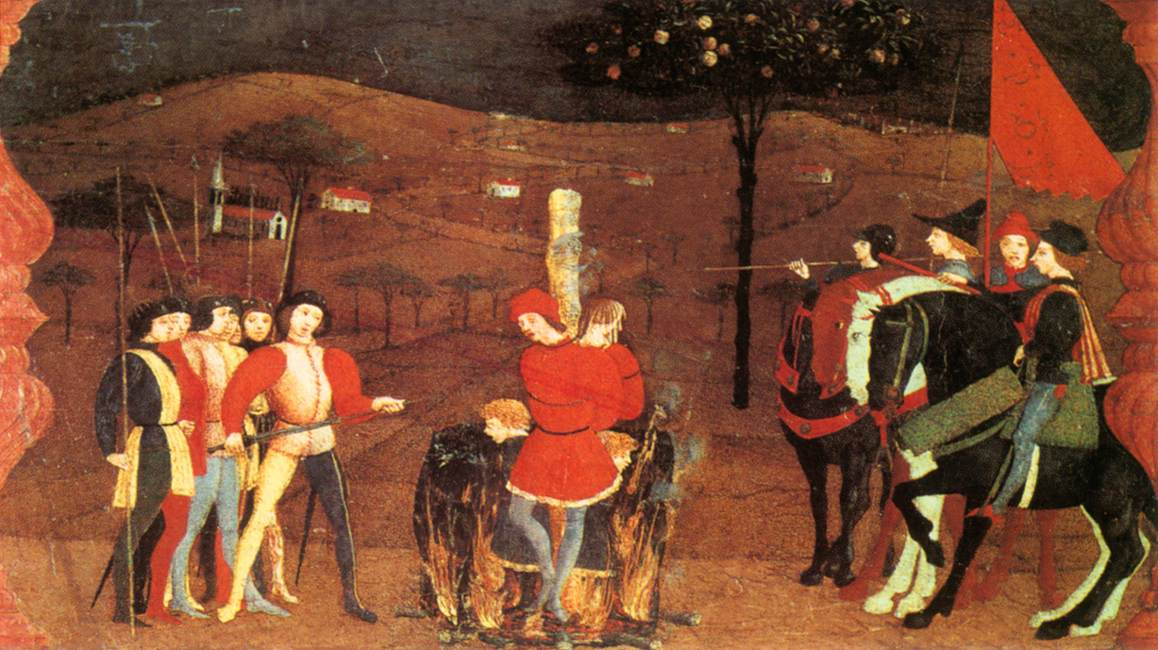
Scene 5

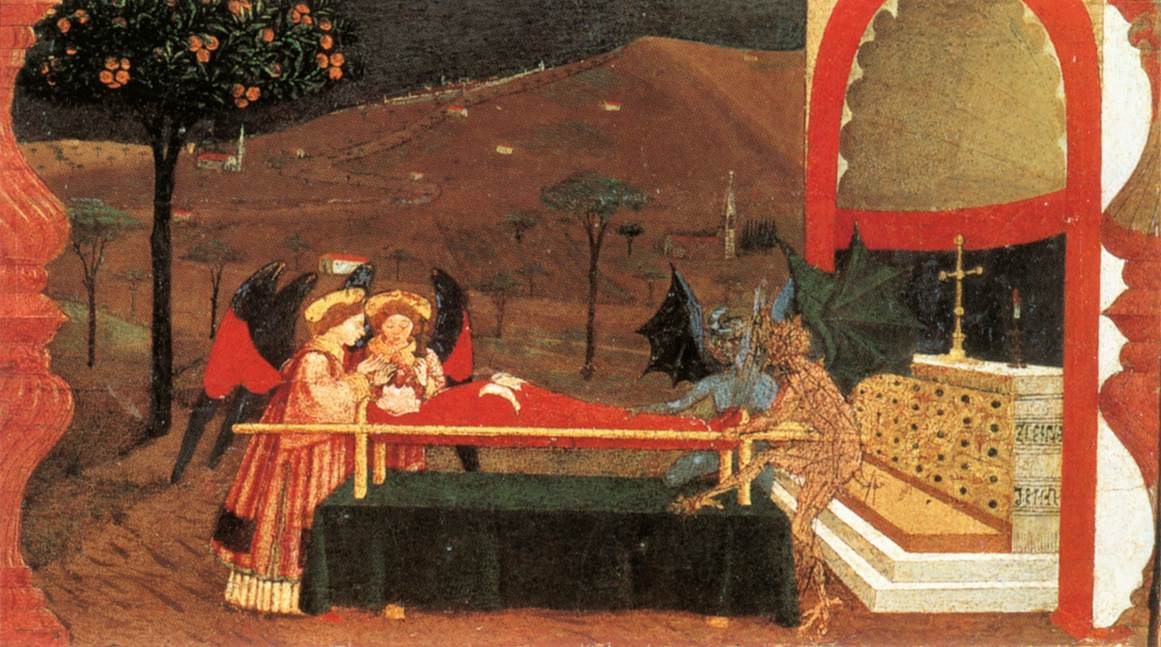
Scene 6

== Bibliography ==
- (in Italian) Franco Borsi and Stefano Borsi, Paolo Uccello, p. 260
- (in French) Jean-Louis Schefer, L’Hostie profanée - histoire d’une fiction théologique, Éditions P.O.L, 2007, ISBN 978-2-84682-208-4
- (in French) Camille Salatko Petryszcze, mémoire de Master, Le Mistere de la Saincte Hostie
- (in French) Introductory summary to the work of Jean-Louis Schefer
