= Karol Lanckoroński =

Polish art collector (1848–1933)

Karol Lanckoronski
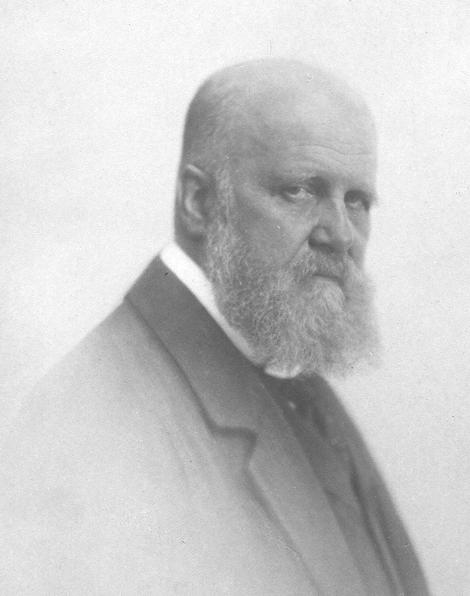
- Born: 4 November 1848; Vienna, Austria
- Died: 15 July 1933 (aged 84); Vienna, Austria
- Occupations: Writer; art collector; patron; historian; book and manuscript collector; traveller; land owner; vice president for the Society of Cultural Protection
- Family: Countess Karolina Lanckoronska

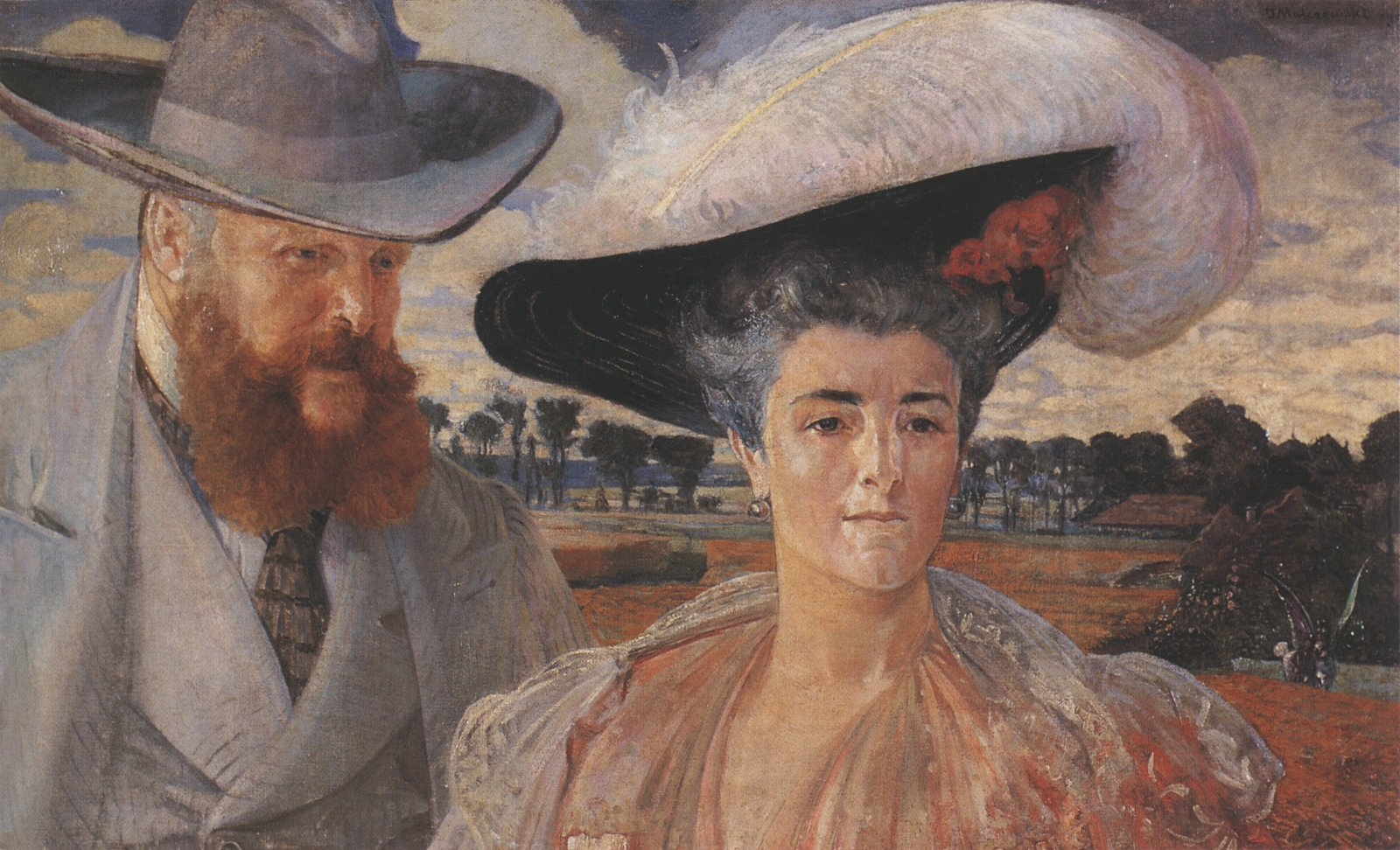
Count Lanckoroński and his wife Małgorzata (née Princess Lichnowsky), portrait by Jacek Malczewski.

Coat of arms of Counts Lanckorońskis

Count Karol Lanckoroński (German: Karl Lanckoronski) (born 4 November 1848 in Vienna; died 15 July 1933 in Vienna) was a Polish writer, art collector, patron, historian, traveler, and vice-president of the Society for Cultural Protection in his native Galicia. He was one of the wealthiest and most cultivated magnates in Austrian partition of Poland and in the whole of the Austro-Hungarian Empire. He was a member of the Polish Academy of Learning.

== Biography ==
Count Lanckoroński studied art history and law, but because of his family's wealth never had to work for a living. In 1882 he participated with Otto Benndorf in an expedition to Lycia in Turkey. In 1885–86 he organised his own exploratory mission to Pamphylia and Pisidia. Further travels took him to East Asia, where he was accompanied by the painter Hans Makart, as well as Spain and Portugal.

He kept his enormous art collection in his city palace in Vienna, the Palais Lanckoronski.

He was Grand Steward to the emperor Franz Joseph I of Austria. After World War I, he spent more time at his family estate in Galicia, in newly independent Poland. He became engaged in art conservation.

He was the father of Countess Karolina Lanckorońska, who became a well-known historian and Polish anti-Nazi resistance fighter during the German occupation of Poland.
