= Paolo Uccello =

Italian painter and mathematician (1397–1475)

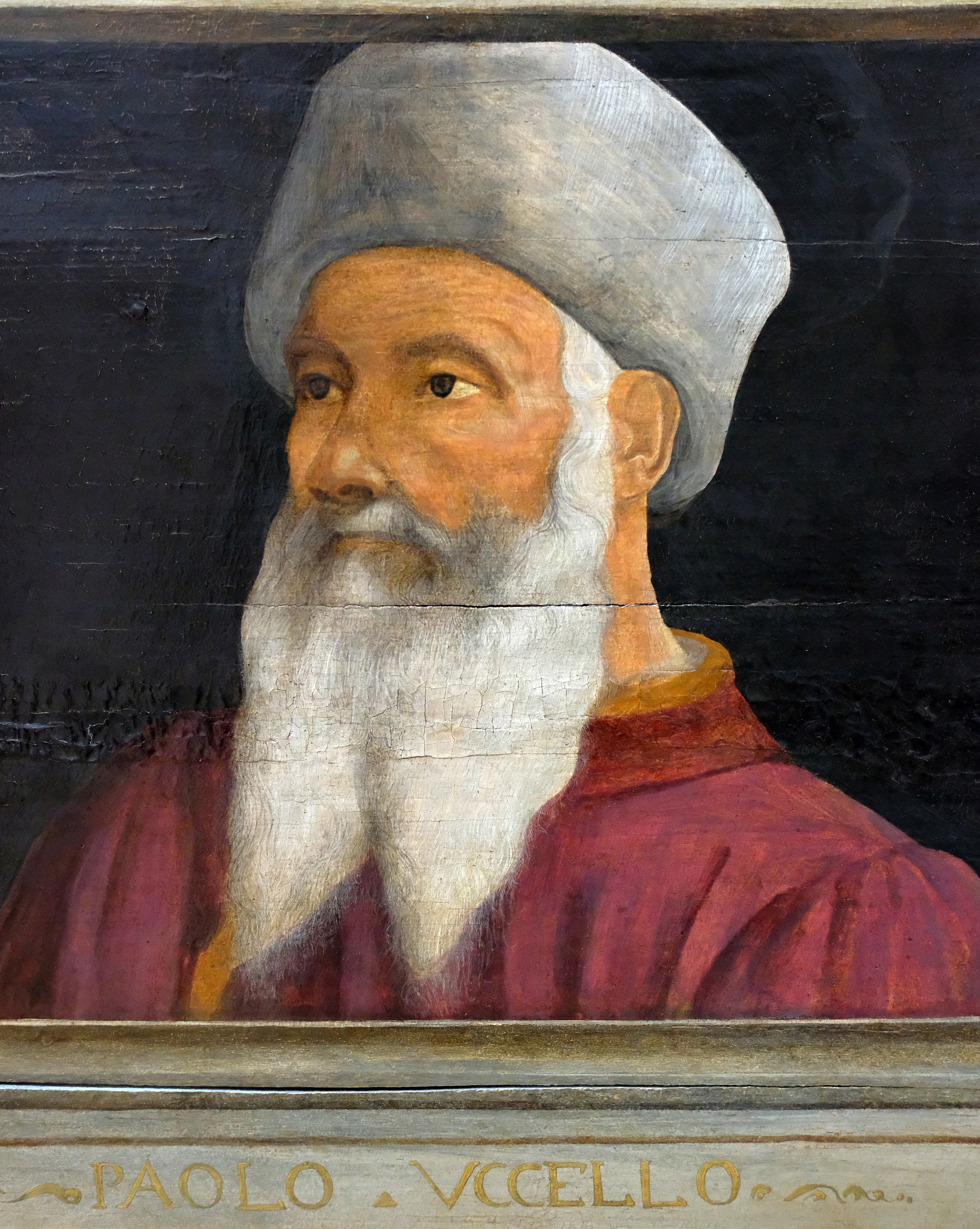
- Portrait of Paolo Uccello (unknown artist); Louvre Museum, Paris
- Born: Paolo di Dono; 1397; Pratovecchio, Republic of Florence
- Died: 10 December 1475 (aged 77–78); Florence, Republic of Florence
- Education: Lorenzo Ghiberti
- Known for: Painting, fresco
- Notable work: Funerary Monument to Sir John Hawkwood, Saint George and the Dragon, The Battle of San Romano
- Movement: Early Renaissance

Paolo Uccello (/uːˈtʃɛloʊ/ oo-CHEL-oh, Italian: [ˈpaːolo utˈtʃɛllo]; 1397 – 10 December 1475), born Paolo di Dono, was an Italian Renaissance painter and mathematician from Florence who was notable for his pioneering work on visual perspective in art. In his book Lives of the Most Excellent Painters, Sculptors, and Architects, Giorgio Vasari wrote that Uccello was obsessed by his interest in perspective and would stay up all night in his study trying to grasp the exact vanishing point. Uccello used perspective to create a feeling of depth in his paintings. His best known works are the three paintings representing the battle of San Romano, which were wrongly entitled the Battle of Sant'Egidio of 1416 for a long period of time.

Paolo worked in the Late Gothic tradition, emphasizing colour and pageantry rather than the classical realism that other artists were pioneering. His style is best described as idiosyncratic, and he left no school of followers. He has had some influence on twentieth-century art and literary criticism (e.g., in the Vies imaginaires by Marcel Schwob, Uccello le poil by Antonin Artaud and O Mundo Como Ideia by Bruno Tolentino).

== Early life and training ==
The sources for Paolo Uccello's life are few: Giorgio Vasari's biography, written 75 years after Paolo's death, and a few contemporary official documents. Uccello probably was born in 1397 in Pratovecchio (near Arezzo), the hometown of his father, Dono di Paolo, a barber-surgeon. His mother, Antonia, was a high-born Florentine. His nickname Uccello ("little bird") came from his fondness for painting birds.

From 1412 until 1416 he was apprenticed to the famous sculptor Lorenzo Ghiberti. Ghiberti was the creator of the doors of the Florence Baptistery and his workshop was the premier centre for Florentine art at the time. Ghiberti's late-Gothic, narrative style and sculptural composition greatly influenced Paolo. It was also around this time that Paolo began his lifelong friendship with Donatello. In 1414, Uccello was admitted to the painters' guild, Compagnia di San Luca, and just one year later, in 1415, he joined the official painter's guild of Florence Arte dei Medici e degli Speziali. Although the young Uccello had probably left Ghiberti's workshop by the mid 1420s, he stayed on good terms with his master and may have been privy to the designs for Ghiberti's second set of Baptistery doors, The Gates of Paradise. These featured a battle scene "that might well have impressed itself in the mind of the young Uccello," and thus influenced The Battle of San Romano.

== Career ==
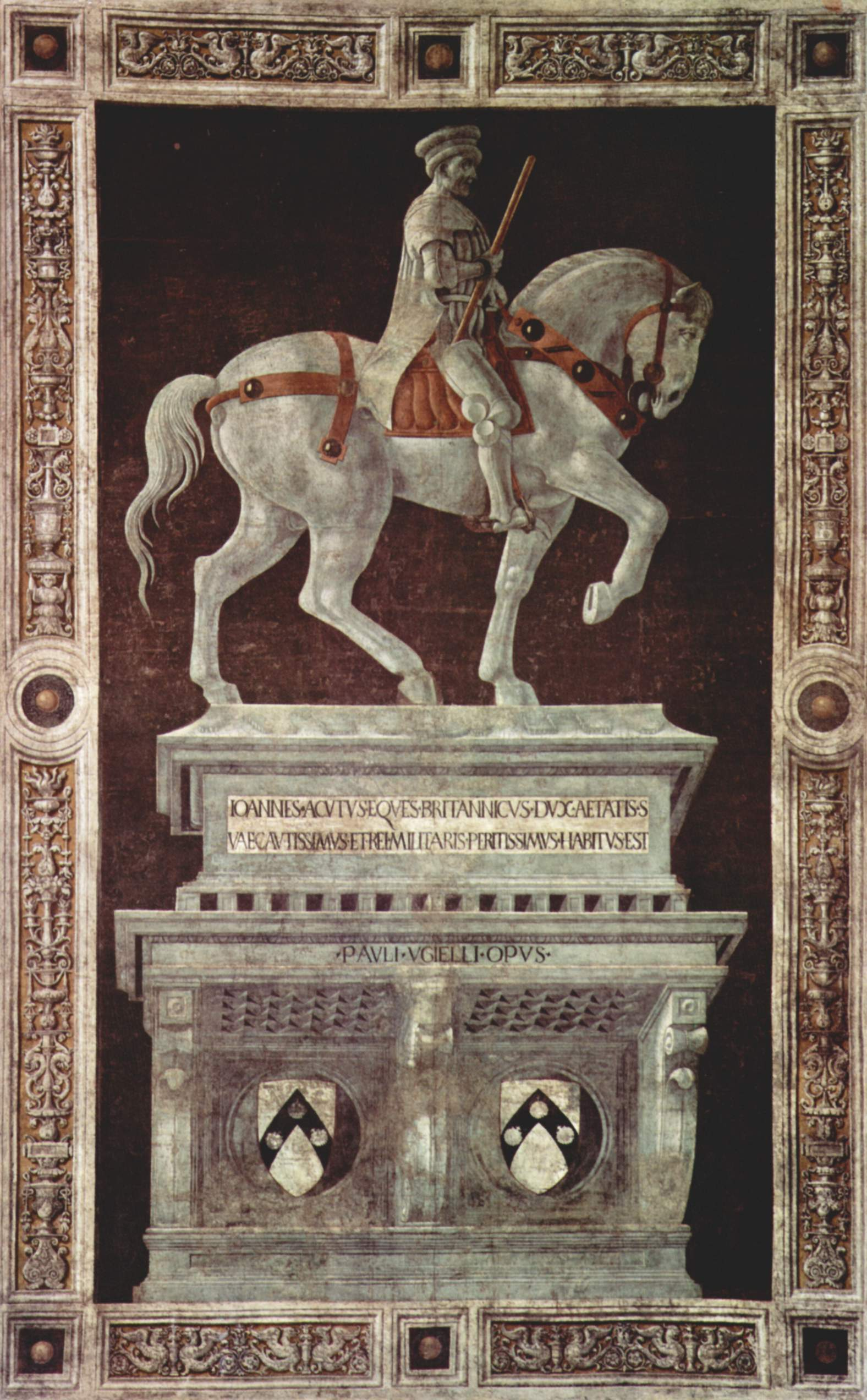
Funerary Monument to Sir John Hawkwood

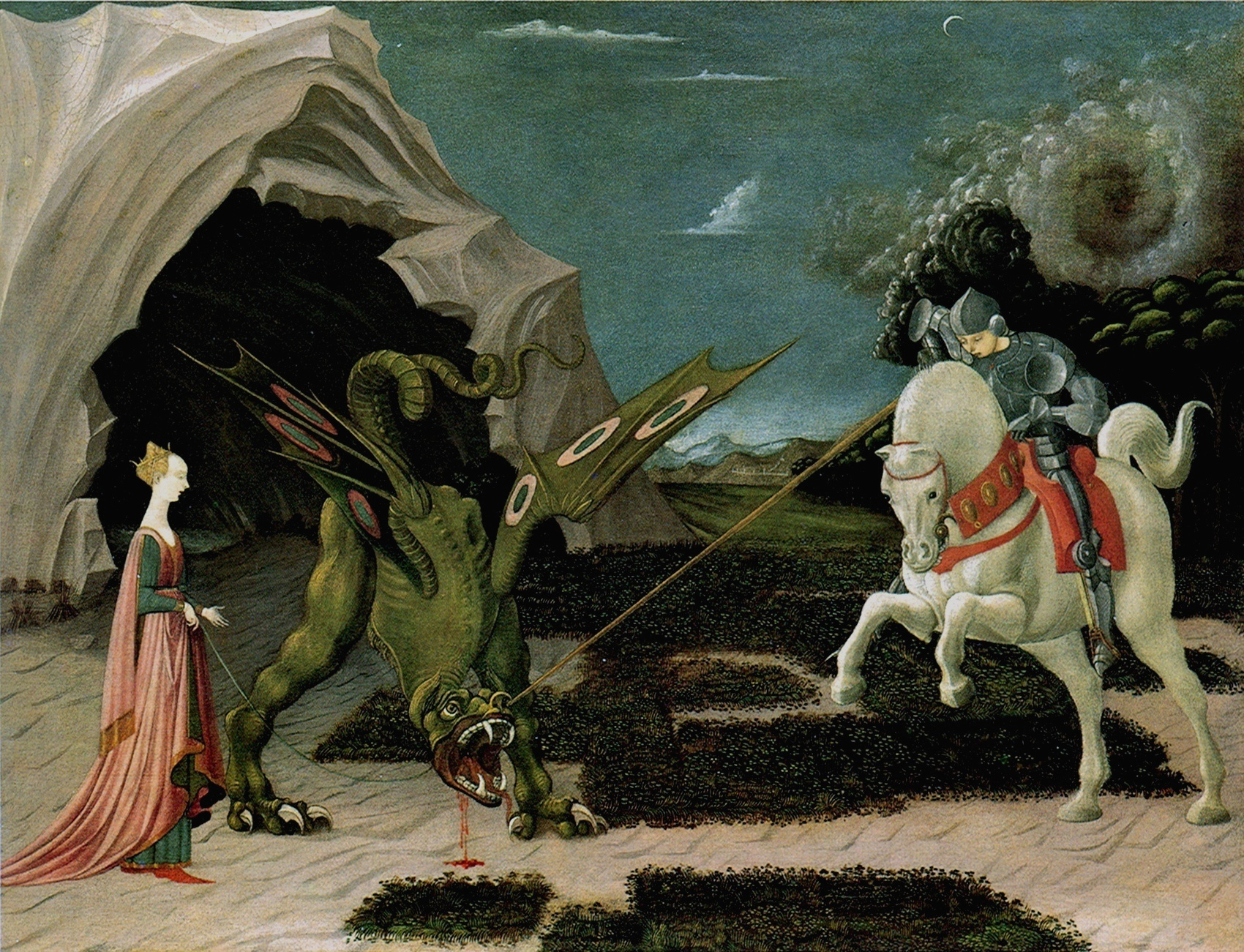
Saint George and the Dragon (c. 1470), showing Uccello's Gothic influences

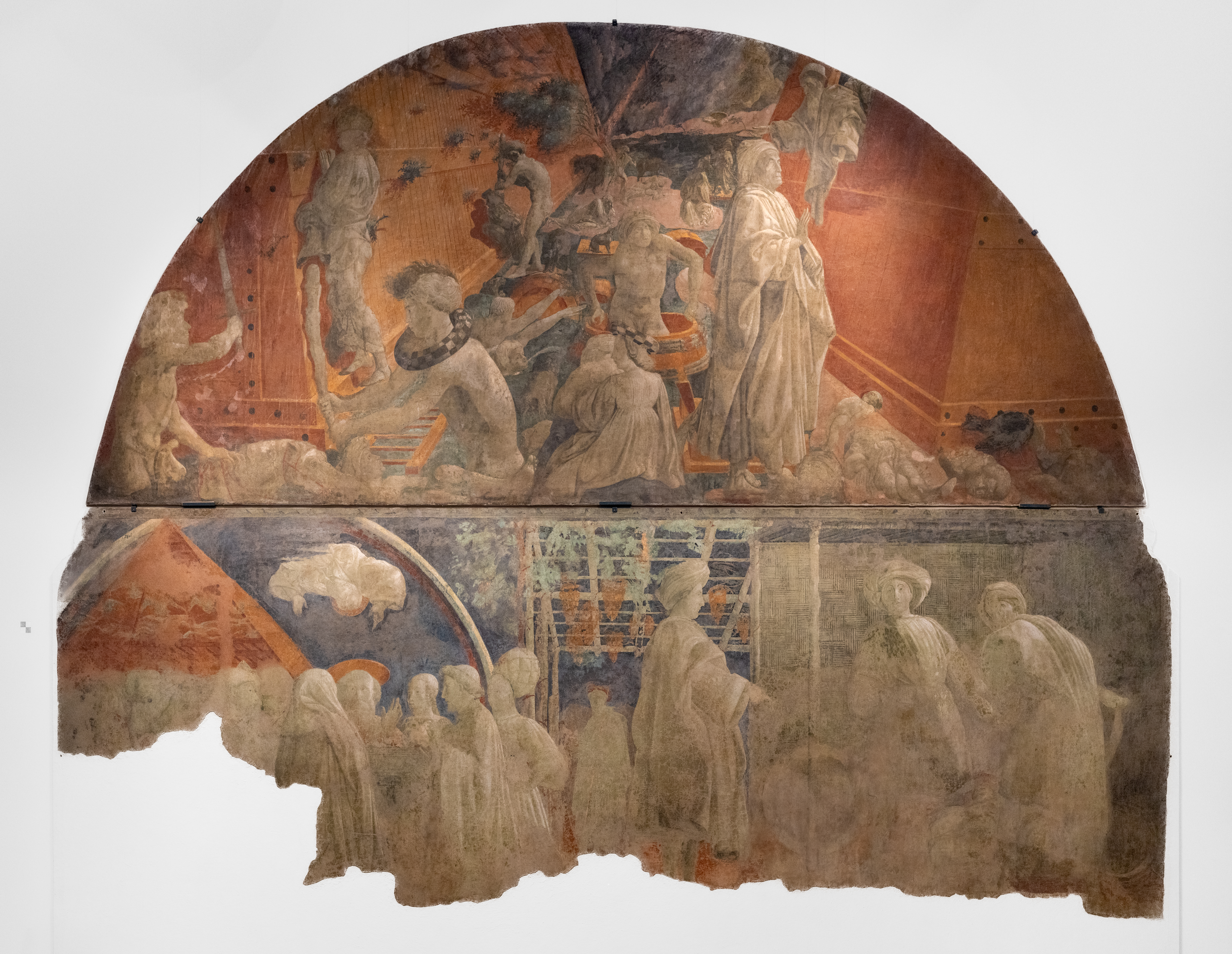
Story of Noah, c. 1447, in the refectory of Santa Maria Novella, Florence

According to Vasari, Uccello's first painting was a Saint Anthony between the saints Cosmas and Damianus, a commission for the hospital of Lelmo. Next, he painted two figures in the convent of Annalena. Shortly afterwards, he painted three frescoes with scenes from the life of Saint Francis above the left door of the Santa Trinita church. For the Santa Maria Maggiore church, he painted a fresco of the Annunciation. In this fresco, he painted a large building with columns in perspective. According to Vasari, people found this to be a great and beautiful achievement because this was the first example of how lines could be expertly used to demonstrate perspective and size. As a result, this work became a model for artists who wished to craft illusions of space in order to enhance the realness of their paintings.

Paolo painted the Lives of the Church Fathers in the cloisters of the church of San Miniato, which sat on a hill overlooking Florence. According to Vasari, Paolo protested against the monotonous meals of cheese pies and cheese soup served by the abbot by running away, and returned to finish the job only after the abbot promised him a more varied diet.

Uccello was asked to paint a number of scenes of distempered animals for the house of the Medici. The scene most appreciated by Vasari was his depiction of a fierce lion fighting with a venom-spouting snake. Uccello loved to paint animals and he kept a wide variety of pictures of animals, especially birds, at home. This love for birds is what led to his nickname, Paolo Uccelli (Paul of the birds).

By 1424, Paolo was earning his own living as a painter. In that year, he proved his artistic maturity by painting episodes of the now-badly-damaged Creation and the Fall for the Green Cloister (Chiostro Verde) of Santa Maria Novella in Florence. Again, this assignment allowed him to paint a large number of animals in a lively manner. He also succeeded in painting trees in their natural colours. This was a skill that was difficult for many of his predecessors, so Uccello also began to acquire a reputation for painting landscapes. He followed this with Scenes from the Life of Noah, also for the Green Cloister. These scenes brought him great fame in Florence.

In 1425, Uccello travelled to Venice, where he worked on the mosaics for the façade of San Marco, which have all since been lost. During this time, he also painted some frescoes in the Prato Cathedral and Bologna. Some suggest he visited Rome with his friend Donatello before returning to Florence in 1431. After he returned, Uccello remained in Florence for most of the rest of his life, executing works for various churches and patrons, most notably the Duomo.

Despite his leave from Florence, interest in Uccello did not diminish. In 1432, the Office of Works asked the Florentine ambassador in Venice to enquire after Uccello's reputation as an artist. In 1436, he was given the commission for the monochromatic fresco of Sir John Hawkwood. This equestrian monument exemplified his keen interest in perspective. The condottiere and his horse are presented as if the fresco was a sculpture seen from below.

It is widely thought that he is the author of the frescoes Stories of the Virgin and Story of Saint Stephen in the Cappella dell'Assunta, Florence, so he likely visited nearby Prato sometime between 1435 and 1440. Later, in 1443, he painted the figures on the clock of the Duomo. In that same year and continuing into 1444, he designed a few stained glass windows for the same church. In 1444 he was also at work in Padua, and he travelled to Padua again in 1445 at Donatello's invitation.

Back in Florence in 1446, he painted the Green Stations of the Cross, again for the cloister of the church Santa Maria Novella. Around 1447–1454 he painted Scenes of Monastic Life for the church San Miniato al Monte, Florence.

== Battle of San Romano paintings ==
Around the mid-1450s, he painted his three most famous paintings, the panels depicting the Battle of San Romano for the Palazzo Medici in Florence, commemorating the victory of the Florentine army over the Sienese in 1432. The extraordinarily foreshortened forms extending in many planes accentuate Uccello's virtuosity as a draftsman, and provides a controlled visual structure to the chaos of the battle scene.

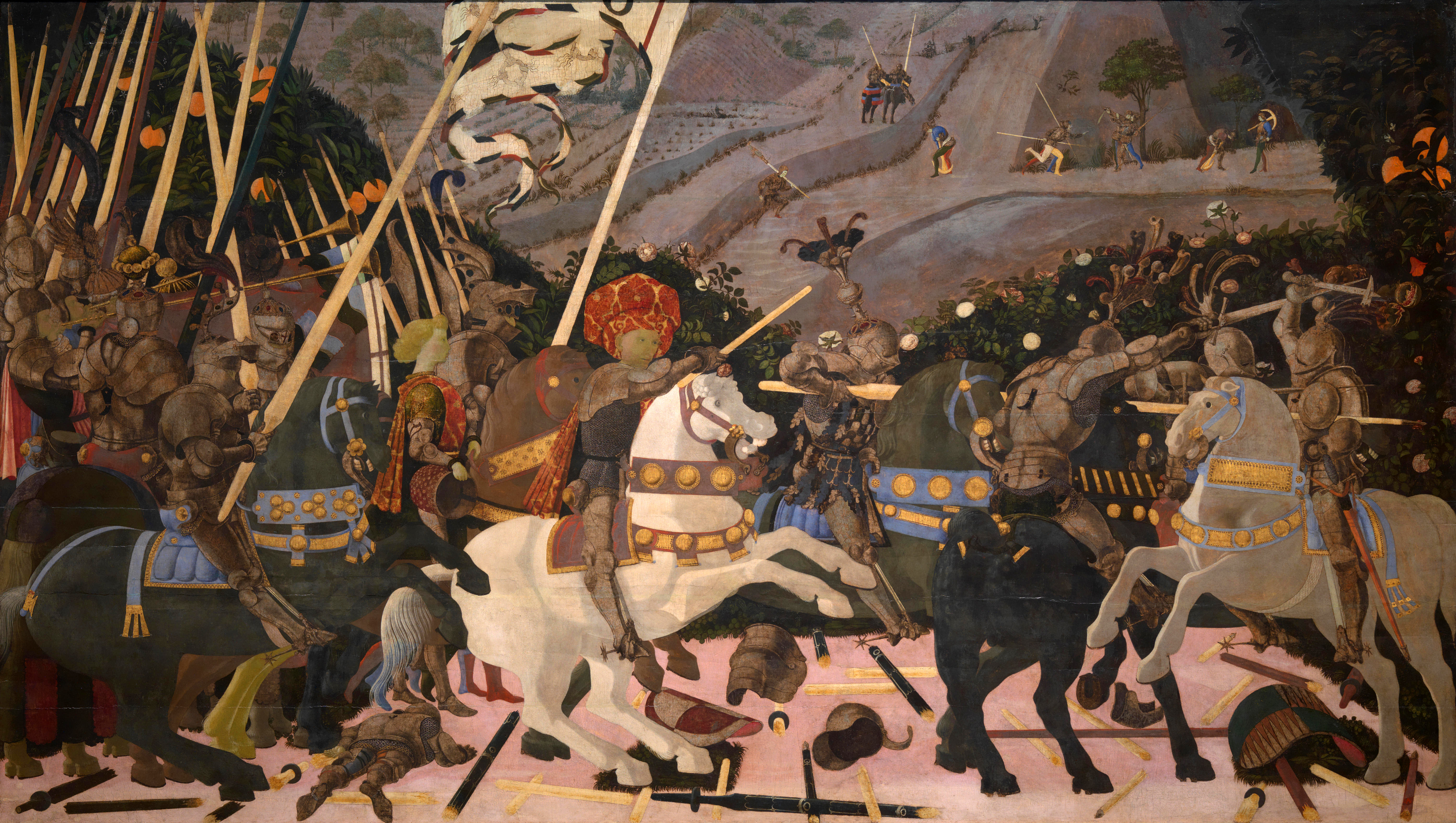
Niccolò Mauruzi da Tolentino at the Battle of San Romano (probably c. 1438–1440), egg tempera with walnut oil and linseed oil on poplar, 182 × 320 cm, National Gallery, London.

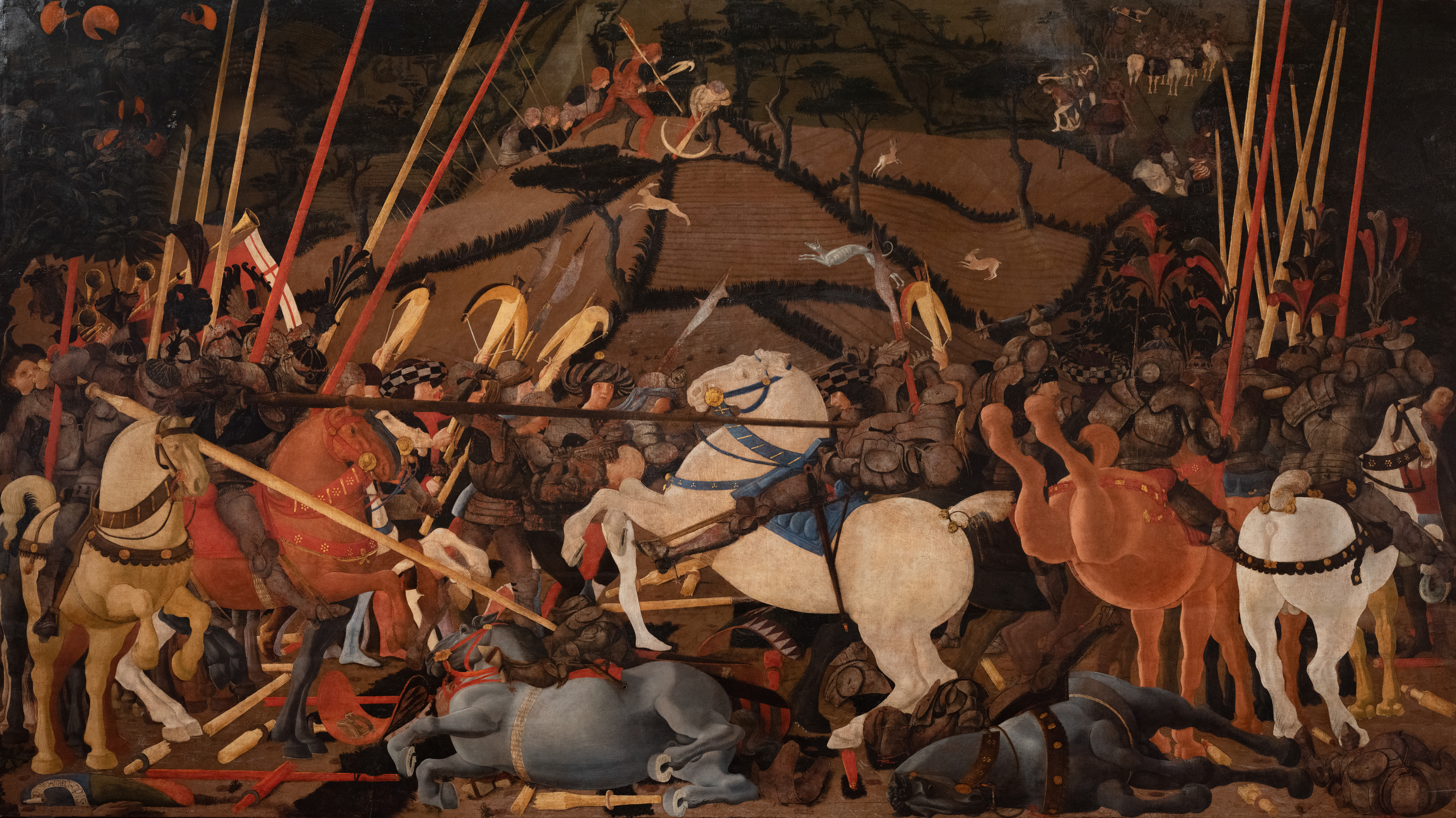
Niccolò Mauruzi da Tolentino unseats Bernardino della Carda at the Battle of San Romano (dating uncertain, c. 1435–1455), tempera on wood, 182 × 320 cm, Galleria degli Uffizi, Florence

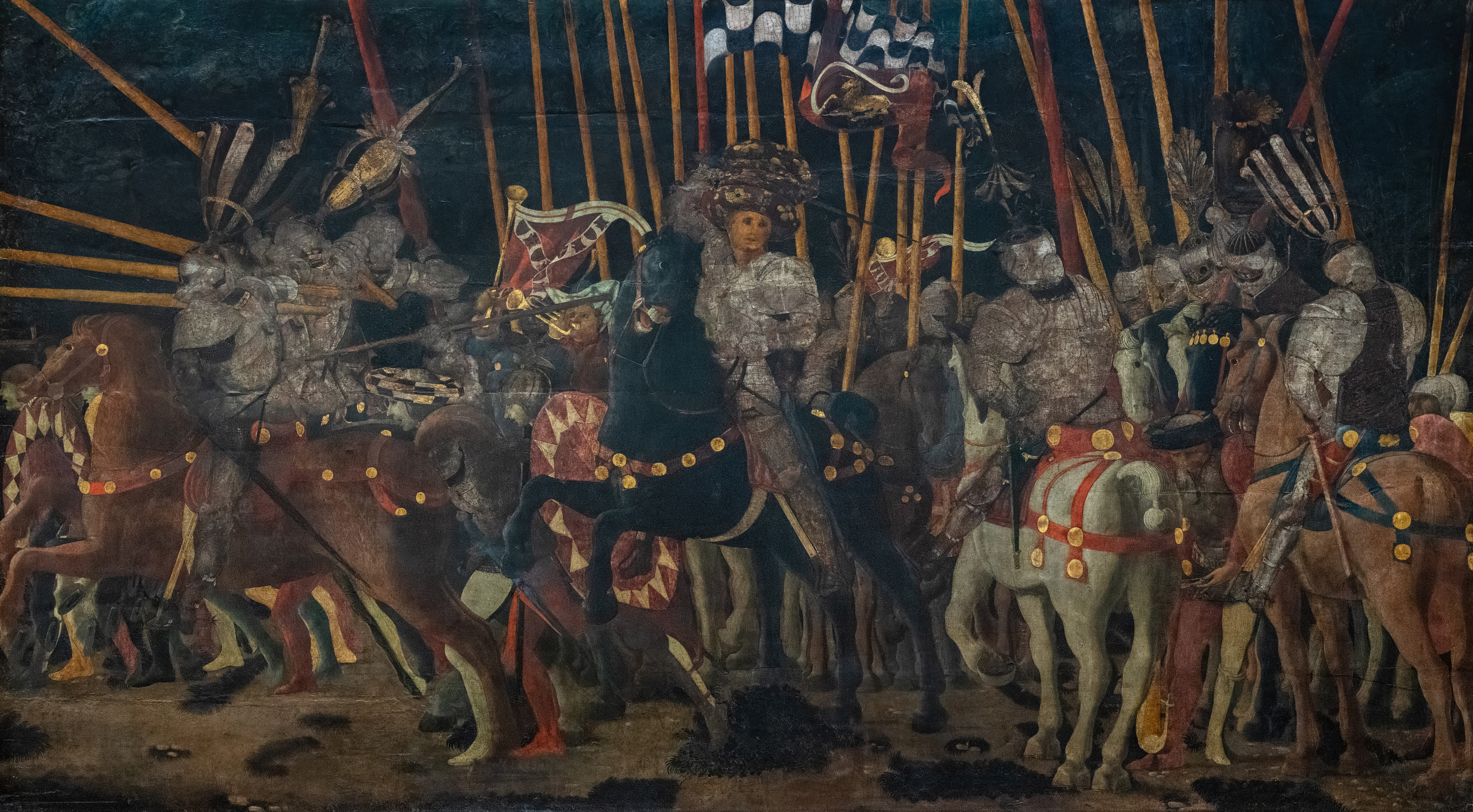
The Counterattack of Michelotto da Cotignola at the Battle of San Romano (c. 1455), wood panel, 182 × 317 cm, Musée du Louvre, Paris

== Later life ==
By 1453, Uccello was married to Tommasa Malifici. This is known because in that year Donato (named after Donatello), was born. Three years later, in 1456, his wife gave birth to their daughter, Antonia. Antonia Uccello (1456–1491) was a Carmelite nun, whom Giorgio Vasari called "a daughter who knew how to draw." She was even noted as a "pittoressa", a painter, on her death certificate. Her style and her skill remains a mystery as none of her work is extant.

From 1465 to 1469, Uccello was in Urbino with his son Donato working for the Confraternity of Corpus Domini, a brotherhood of laymen. During this time, he painted the predella for their new altarpiece with the Miracle of the Profaned Host. (The main panel representing the "Communion of the Apostles" was commissioned to Justus van Ghent and finished in 1474). Uccello's predella is composed of six meticulous, naturalistic scenes related to the antisemitic myth of host desecration, which was based upon an event that supposedly occurred in Paris in 1290. It has been suggested that the subject of the main panel, on which Duke Frederick of Montefeltro of Urbino appears in the background conversing with an Asian, is related to the antisemitic intention of the predella. However, Federico did allow a small Jewish community to live in Urbino and not all of these scenes are unanimously attributed to Paolo Uccello.

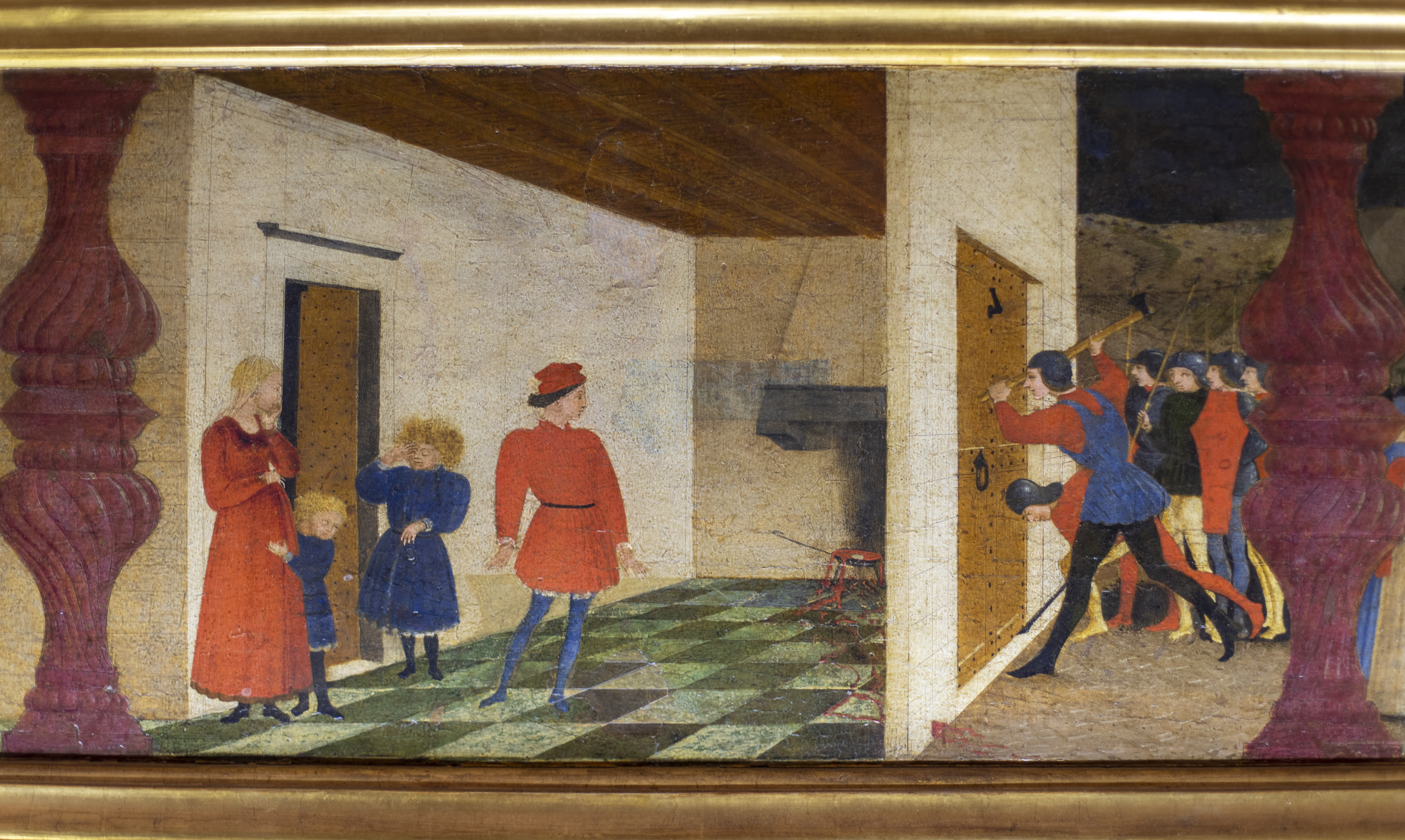
A scene in Paolo Uccello's Corpus Domini predella (c. 1465–1468), set in a Jewish pawnbroker's home. Blood in the background emanates from the Host, which the moneylender has attempted to cook, and seeps under the door. This story first entered the Italian literary tradition via Giovanni Villani (c. 1280–1348) and his Nuova Cronica.

In his Florentine tax return of August 1469, Uccello declared, "I find myself old and ailing, my wife is ill, and I can no longer work." In the last years of his life, Paolo was a lonesome and forgotten man who was afraid of hardship in life. His last known work is The Hunt, c. 1470. He made his testament on 11 November 1475 and died shortly afterwards on 10 December 1475 at the hospital of Florence, at the age of 78. He was buried in his father's tomb in the Florentine church of Santo Spirito.

With his precise and analytical mind, Paolo Uccello tried to apply a scientific method to depict objects in three-dimensional space. In particular, some of his studies of the perspective foreshortening of the torus are preserved, and one standard display of drawing skill was his depiction of the mazzocchio. In the words of G. C. Argan: "Paolo's rigour is similar to the rigour of Cubists in the early 20th century, whose images were more true when they were less true to life. Paolo constructs space through perspective, and historic event through the structure of space; if the resulting image is unnatural and unrealistic, so much the worse for nature and history." The perspective in his paintings has influenced many famous painters, such as Piero della Francesca, Albrecht Dürer and Leonardo da Vinci, to name a few.

== Works ==
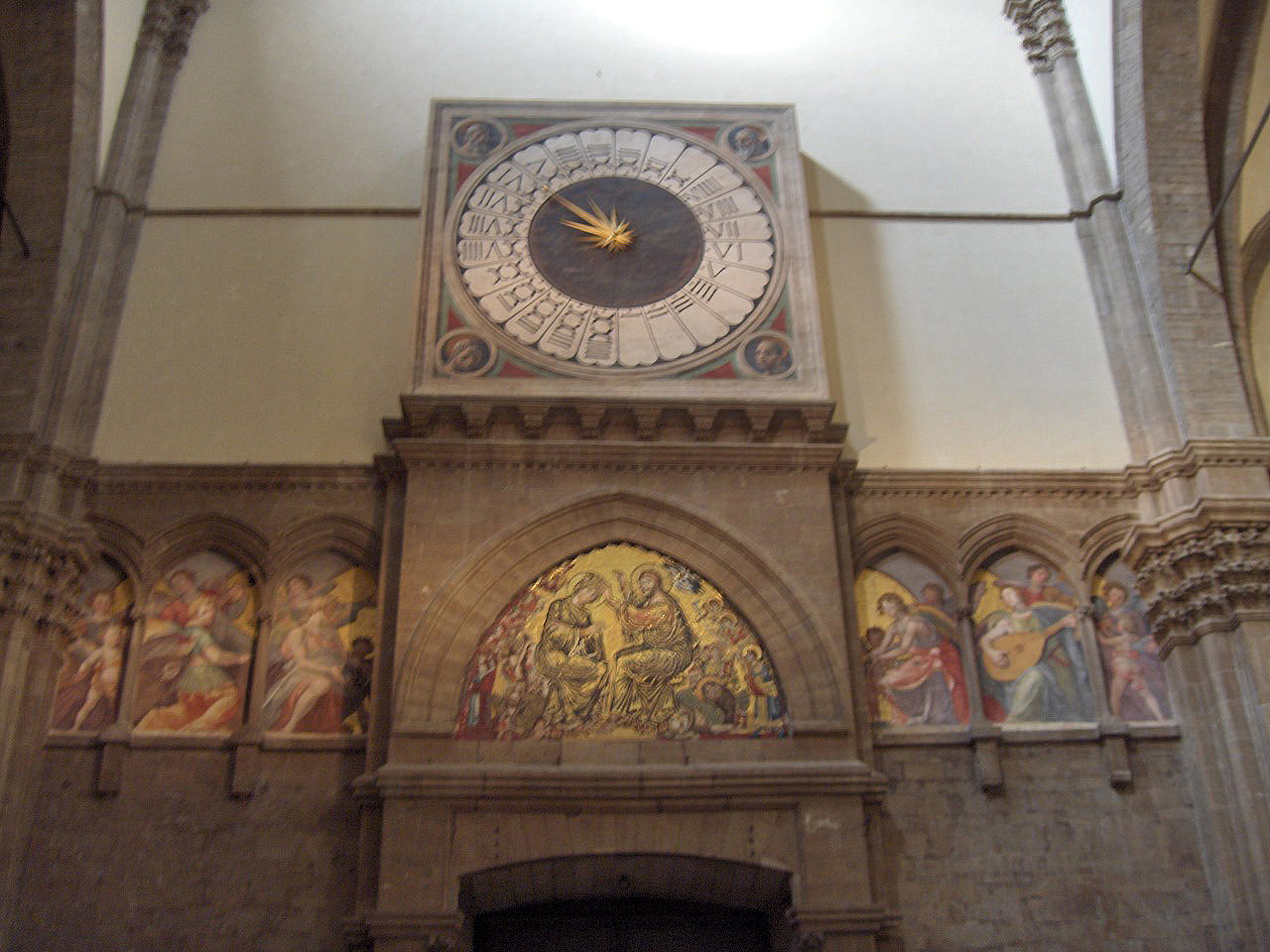
Clock in the Duomo, Florence

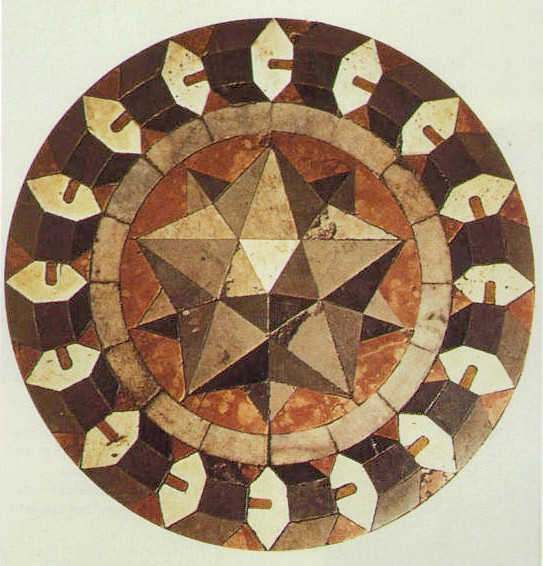
Marble mosaic showing a small stellated dodecahedron and a ring of hexagonal prisms, on the floor of St Mark's Basilica, Venice

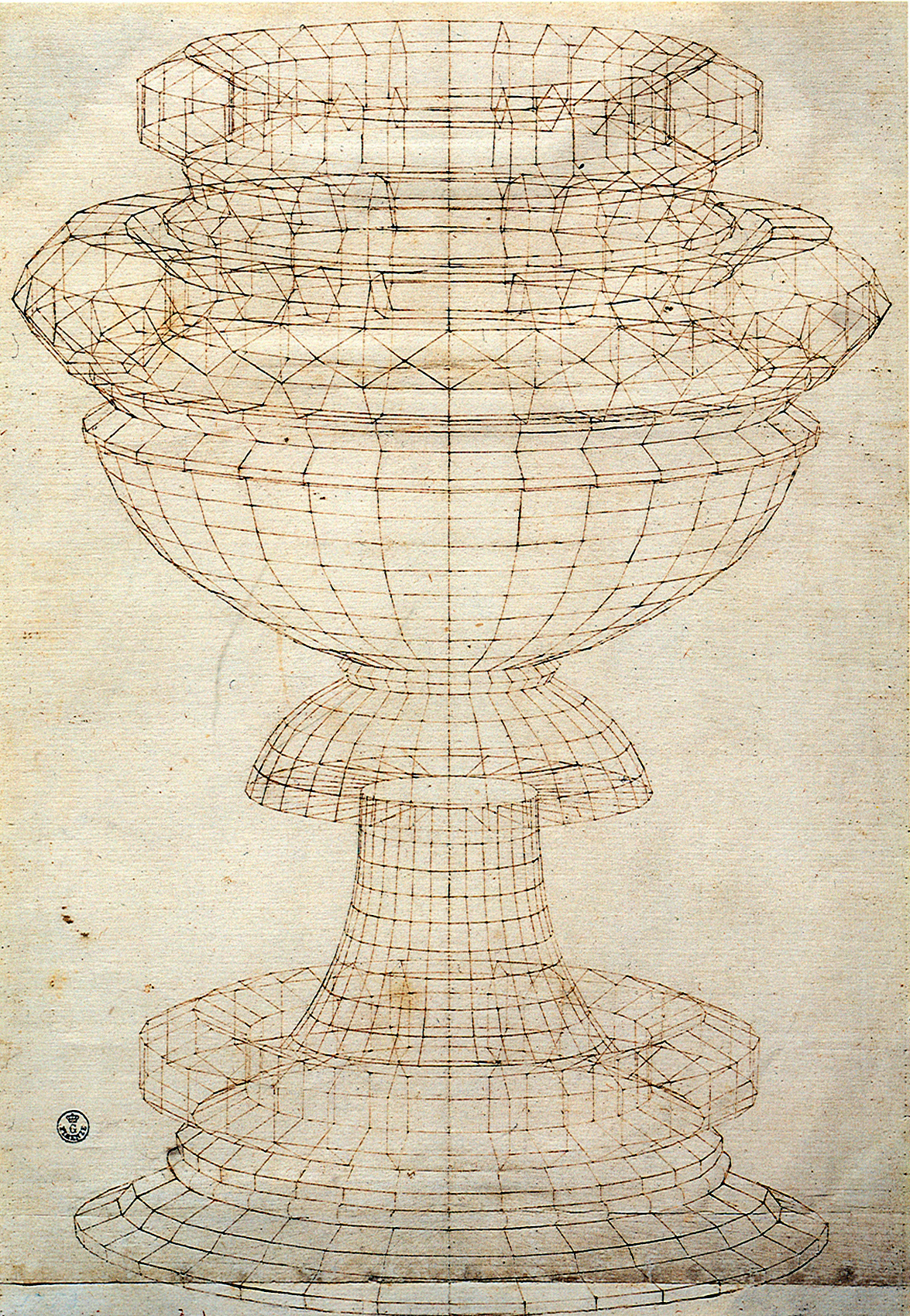
Perspective study of a vase

Pope-Hennessy is far more conservative than the Italian authors: he attributes some of the works below to a "Prato Master" and a "Karlsruhe Master". Most of the dates in the list (taken from Borsi and Borsi) are derived from stylistic comparison rather than from documentation.

- Annunciation (c. 1420–1425) - Ashmolean Museum, Oxford
- Crucifixion with Two Angels (c. 1423) - Private collection
- Creation and Fall (c.1424–1425) - Lunette and lower section, Chiostro Verde, Santa Maria Novella, Florence
- Adoration of the Magi (c. 1431–1432) - Staatliche Kunsthalle, Karlsruhe
- Perspective Study of a Vase (c. 1430) - Uffizi Gallery, Florence
- Saint George Slaying the Dragon (c. 1430) - National Gallery of Victoria, Melbourne
- Quarate Predella (c. 1433) - Museo diocesano di Santo Stefano al Ponte, Florence
- Frescoes in the Capella dell' Assunta (c. 1434–1435) - Duomo, Prato
- Nun-Saint with Two Children (c.1434–1435) - Contini-Bonacosi Collection, Florence
- Funerary Monument to Sir John Hawkwood (c. 1436) - Duomo, Florence
- The Battle of San Romano, consisting of:

- Battle of San Romano: Niccolò da Tolentino (c. 1450–1456) - National Gallery, London
- Battle of San Romano: Bernadino della Ciarda unhorsed (c. 1450–1456) - Galleria degli Uffizi, Florence
- Battle of San Romano: Micheletto da Cotignola (c. 1450) - Musée du Louvre, Paris

- St George and the Dragon (c. 1439–1440) - Musée Jacquemart-André, Paris
- Clock Face with Four Prophets/Evangelists (1443) - Duomo, Florence
- Resurrection (1443–1444) - stained glass window, Duomo, Florence
- Nativity (1443–1444) - stained glass window, Duomo, Florence
- Story of Noah (c. 1447) - lunette and lower section, Chiostro Verde, Santa Maria Novella, Florence
- Scenes of Monastic Life (c. 1447–1454) - S. Miniato al Monte, Florence
- Saint George and the Dragon (c. 1450–55) - National Gallery, London
- Crucifixion (c. 1457–1458) - Thyssen-Bornemisza Collection, Madrid
- Life of the Holy Fathers (c. 1460–1465) - Accademia, Florence
- Miracle of the Profaned Host (1467–1468) - predella, Galleria Nazionale delle Marche, Palazzo Ducale, Urbino
- The Hunt in the Forest (c. 1470) -- Ashmolean Museum, Oxford
- The Battle of Greeks and Amazons Before the Walls of Troy; Allegories of Faith and Justice; and Reclining Nude (c. 1460) - chest, Yale University Art Gallery, New Haven, Connecticut

== Sources ==
- Giorgio Vasari's life of Paolo Uccello translated by George Bull in Lives of the Artists, Part 1. Penguin Classics, 1965.
- D'Ancona, Paola. Paolo Uccello. New York: McGraw Hill, 1961.
- Barolsky, Paul. "The Painter Who Almost Became a Cheese". Virginia Quarterly Review, 70/1 (Winter 1994).
- Borsi, Franco & Borsi, Stefano. Paolo Uccello. London: Thames & Hudson, 1994. (a massive monograph)
- Borsi, Stefano. Paolo Uccello. Art Dossier. Florence: Giunti, nd.
- Carli, Enzo. All the Paintings of Paolo Uccello. The Complete Library of World Art. London: Oldbourne, 1963. (originally published in Italian in the 1950s)
- Hudson, Hugh. Paolo Uccello: Artist of the Florentine Renaissance Republic. Saarbrücken: VDM Verlag Dr. Mueller, 2008.
- Hudson, Hugh. "From Via della Scala to the Cathedral: Social Spaces and the Visual Arts in Paolo Uccello's Florence". Place: An Interdisciplinary e-journal, 2007.
- Lavin, Marilyn Aronberg (1967). "The Altar of Corpus Domini in Urbino: Paolo Uccello, Joos Van Ghent, Piero della Francesca". Art Bulletin. 49 (1): 1–24. doi:10.2307/3048425. JSTOR 3048425.
- Manescalchi, Roberto. Paolo Uccello: un affresco dimenticato?. Florence: Grafica European Center of Fine Arts, 2006. ISBN 978-88-95450-19-3
- Paolieri, Annarita. Paolo Uccello, Domenico Veneziano, Andrea del Castagno. Library of Great Masters. New York: SCALA/Riverside, 1991.
- Pope-Hennessy, John. Paolo Uccello: Complete Edition. 2nd ed. London: Phaidon, 1969. (the other important English-language monograph)
- Singh, Iona (2012). "Visual Syntax". Color, Facture, Art & Design. United Kingdom: Zero Books. pp. 65–82.
