= Castle of Pontevico =

Castle in Pontevico, Italy

- Pontevico, Lombardy in Italy
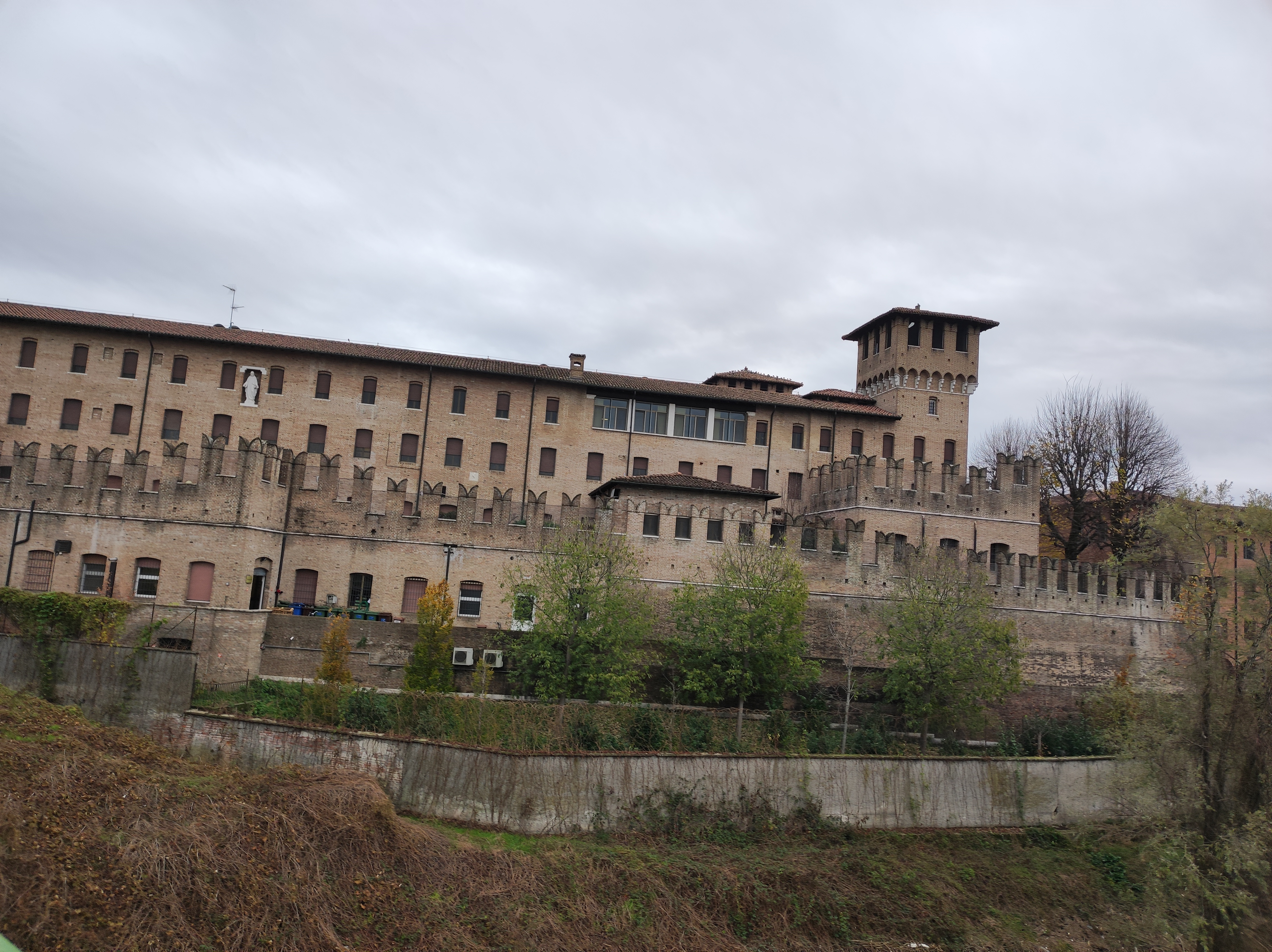
- Pontevico Castle as seen from the bridge over the Oglio River, which connects the Province of Brescia with the Province of Cremona.

Site information
- Owner: Bassano Cremonesini Institute
- Controlled by: Kingdom of Italy; Free municipality of Brescia; Seignory of Milan; Duchy of Milan; Seigniory of Brescia; Republic of Venice; French First Republic; First French Empire; Austrian Empire; Kingdom of Italy
- Condition: Restored, used as a neuropsychiatric institute

Location
- Coordinates: 45°16′17″N 10°05′06″E

Site history
- Built: 9th century, subsequently rebuilt and restored several times
- Demolished: 1260, 1362, 1453, 1844
- Battles/wars: Battle of Cortenuova; Wars in Lombardy: First siege of Pontevico; Second siege of Pontevico; Third Siege of Pontevico; War of Ferrara; Italian Wars of 1499–1504; War of the League of Cambrai

The Castle of Pontevico is a former fortification built at the height of the early Middle Ages in Pontevico, Province of Brescia, currently used as a neuropsychiatric institute. It has also been remodeled several times over the centuries, due to the continuous sieges suffered over time. It was completely rebuilt in 1844, and the current version dates from the second half of the 20th century.

== History ==
=== The origins of the fortress ===
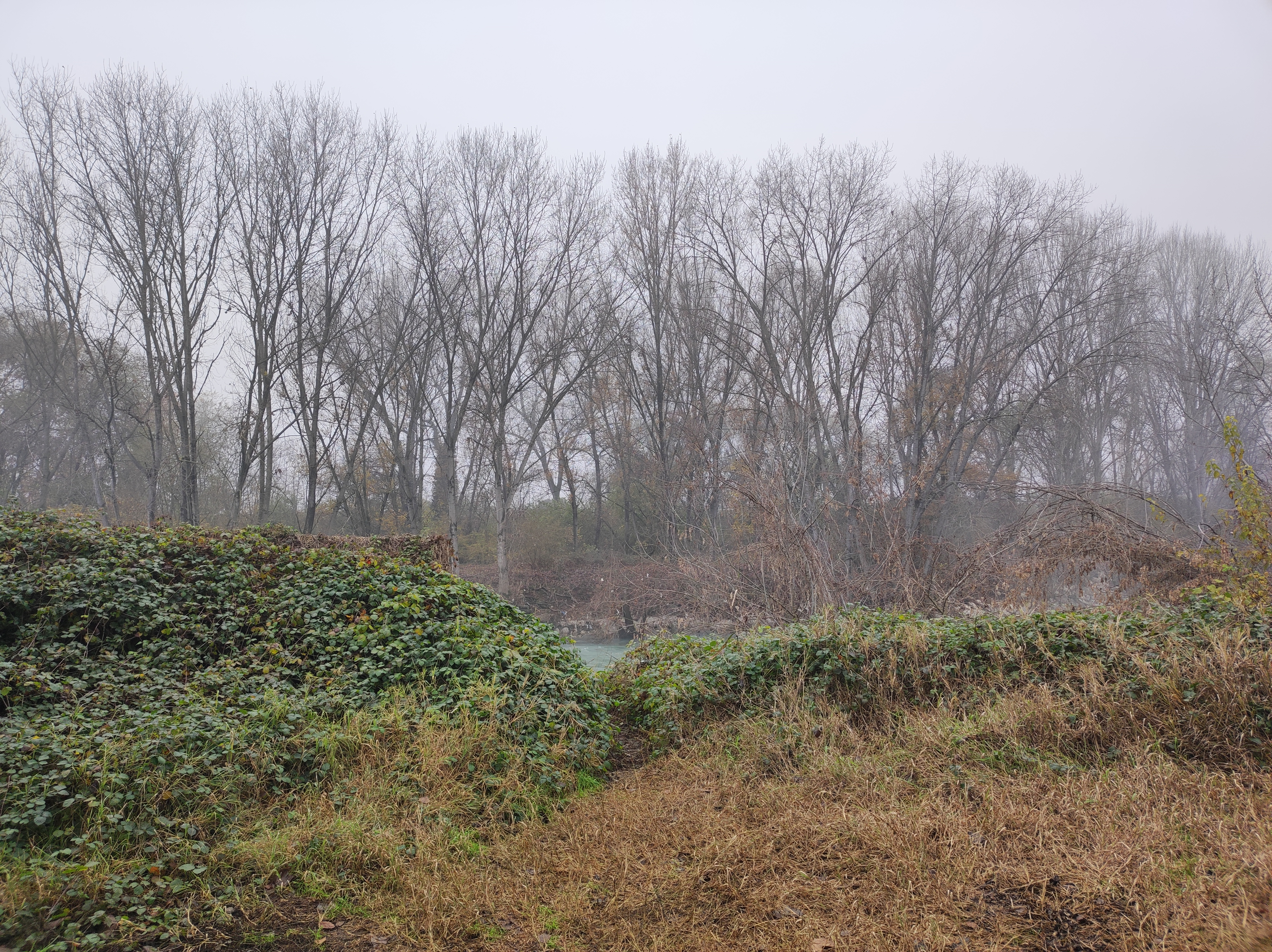
The Oglio River in front of the castle.

With the Frankish conquest of the territory at the hands of Charlemagne, dating back to the 9th century, feudal struggles began (first between bishoprics and then between communes) and Pontevico found itself placed in an important strategic position along the course of the Oglio River.

The first construction of a castle dates back to the end of the 9th century due to the continuous raids carried out by the Hungarians at that time, being remembered in the chronicles of the time as a colossal stronghold, called munitissimum castrum. A wide moat equipped with drawbridges surrounded the fortress and encircled its forts. It is thought of the ancient presence of an underground road that, starting from the castle, connected Pontevico to nearby Robecco d'Oglio.

=== The long conflict between Guelphs and Ghibellines ===
==== 12th century ====
On July 26, 1127, Count Goizone Martinengo granted the investiture of Pontevico Castle to Bishop Villano and the consuls of the Commune of Brescia.

In 1191, Pontevico Castle had been, at the hands of Emperor Henry VI, ceded to the people of Cremona. However, it is known for certain that, in January of the following year, it immediately returned to Brescian hands, so much so that along with it came under Pontevico's control not only the waters of the Oglio River, but also the 100 trabucchi (170 meters) starting from the right bank of the Oglio, in Cremonese territory, and with them plantations, pastures and every building located in that area.

Also by the end of the 12th century, the fortress was one of the most important in the Brescian area, so much so that in the same period it was further renovated and enlarged as part of the grandiose military measures of the Commune of Brescia to deal with the growing threat from Cremona. On the occasion of the laying of the foundation stone of the new fortress, a special ceremony was held, in which the three most influential men in the town, after touching the pole of the public banner with their right hand, bowed and kissed the foundation stone, with the bishop's blessing.

The conflict between Guelphs and Ghibellines was developing during the century: Cremona was a city of Ghibelline traditions and bargained for the Empire, while Brescia was Guelph and bargained for the Church. The contadi of the two cities were divided by the Oglio River, and at the center of the border was Pontevico, which became the bulwark of the defense of Brescia's territory.

==== 13th century ====
The fortress of Pontevico was, during this period, the target of Brescian outlaws who, out of spite against the city, tried to take possession of the fortress and cede it to the Cremonese. In 1208, the most egregious case happened: the Marquis Guido Lupo, commanding an army reinforced by soldiers from Parma and Cremona, besieged the castle and took possession of it, though it is not known whether by force or through the surrender or betrayal of the garrison commanders. The fort was then ceded to the Cremonese. However, due to Milanese help, the Brescians managed in the same year to retake the fortress, commanded by the then podestà of Brescia Obizone Pusterla. Guelph soldiers managed to penetrate the castle during the night with the enemy sentries half-asleep, so much so that with that event the mocking phrase Dormono i cremonesi nel castello di Pontevico (The Cremonese sleep in Pontevico Castle) was born.

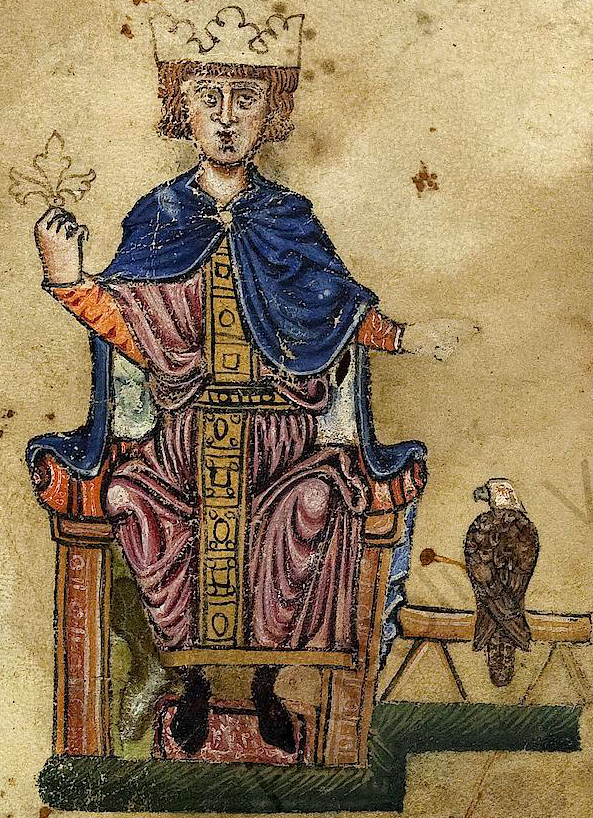
Frederick II of Swabia in Pontevico found no resistance from the Guelphs, managing to take possession of the castle on the eve of the Battle of Cortenuova.

In 1237, on the eve of the Battle of Cortenuova, the army of the Lombard League was stationed in the fortress. The army made the mistake of moving northwest, leaving Frederick II to cross the Oglio River right at Pontevico, where he found no resistance. The Emperor gave a military parade in the town, in which not only the Alemannic soldiers took part, but also the Saracens, who paraded their war elephants through the streets of the town. The following year, with the defeat suffered in the siege of Brescia, Frederick was forced to leave Pontevico (which he set on fire on the way to the town), which returned to the hands of the Brescians. However, in 1242 the Malessardi outlaws managed to seize the castle and cede it to the Cremonese. The Brescians managed to retake Pontevico in 1248, following the defeat suffered by the emperor in Parma. On March 8, 1252, Brescia and Cremona reached a settlement.

In this period, as a document signed by Alberto Notaio indicates, there were two castles in the town. In addition to this one, the larger one located in the upper part of the town, there was another one defending the lower part of the town, still called borgo, which disappeared during this century.

In 1260, Uberto Pelavicino conquered the Brescia area; however, the people of Brescia dismissed the governors imposed by the marquis, who, in quick response, razed many castles in the Lower Brescian area, including that of Pontevico. Despite this, the town returned to Brescian hands, while the fortress was rebuilt over the next few years.

==== 14th century ====
In 1308, the episode of Bishop Nicholas of Butrint is notable. The prelate was the bearer of an important letter and was in Soncino, subsequently being taken prisoner in Pontevico, garrisoned by 300 Guelphs. However, the religious man, after destroying the incriminated letter, ordered his servants to arrange everything as best he could and invited all the soldiers who were holding him to lunch in the military compound. As can be deduced from his diary, the bishop asked to be allowed to go to Robecco d'Oglio for wine, which was then in short supply at the castle:

The river could not be traversed without a boat, so, having set the tables, I asked without fail to go, accompanied by a friar preacher known to the people of Pontevico, to Robecco to provide the necessary wine.

— Nicholas of Butrint, diary

Thus, having crossed the Oglio, he did indeed keep his promise to send wine to the castle, but he did so by sending back the friar of Pontevico and pretending, in agreement with the castellan of Robecco, to be detained in the village. He thus managed to free himself by an ingenious stratagem.

In 1311, the fortress was passed into the possession of the Ghibelline Giberto da Correggio, following the faction's success in the Siege of Brescia, which brought the entire Brescia area under the Lordship of Milan. During much of the 14th century, Brescia and Cremona being subjugated by the Visconti, it was precisely the Visconti and the Scaligeri, lords of Verona, who fought over the territory.

The coat of arms of the Della Scala family, which during the 14th century opposed the hegemony of the Visconti family.

In 1362, the anti-Visconti League took possession of the village but the castellan managed to maintain control of the fortress, calling Bernabò Visconti to his aid. The armies of the League, formed by the Lords of Verona, Ferrara, Mantua and Carrara, with the support of the local population (the fortress did not contain any inhabitants of Pontevico), besieged the castle with 28 companies of knights and a large number of foot soldiers.

The Allies placed in front of the castle twenty-eight cavalrymen's insignia, as well as a large number of foot soldiers.

— Matteo Villani, Historie

Bernabò, having gathered a good number of knights, headed for the fortress. Meanwhile, the besiegers, not knowing what aid the Visconti had sent, ended up putting the conquest of the fortress on the back burner; thus, the castellan warned Bernabò, who had arrived near Pontevico, of the Guelphs' lack of vigilance.

Having taken the lower part of the Castle, those in the Fortress bargained to surrender in case no help arrived within a few days. The Allies placed many soldiers in the Castle, who, not being aware of the amount of reinforcements arriving, were placed haphazardly. The very shrewd castellan understood their lack of vigilance and reported this to M. Bernabò.

— Matteo Villani, Historie

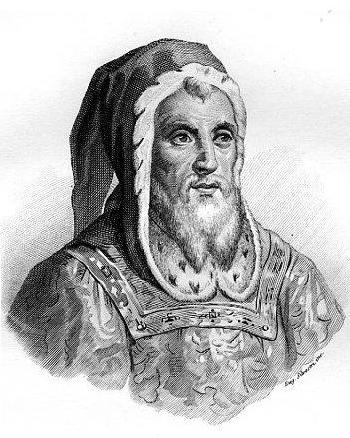
Bernabò Visconti, Lord of Milan from 1354 to 1385, proved particularly ruthless toward the castle of Pontevico, whose walls were torn down.

Thus it was that, at night, Visconti and his troops managed to sneak inside the fortress through the drawbridges. By day, the army broke out of the fortress and attacked the League, who responded in large numbers with the support of the people of Pontevico, armed with stones and spears. Despite initial resistance, the League army could not hold out for long and was forced to surrender. Pontevico was sacked and its inhabitants massacred or imprisoned, and the city walls were torn down.

=== The century of the condottieri ===
In 1404, the presence of Ugolino Cavalcabò is recorded inside the fortress, which he employed as a base for his own military operations, gathering there about 7,000 infantrymen and 200 horses. Also at the beginning of the 15th century, a truce with an exchange of prisoners was signed in the castle between Cabrino Fondulo (who requested to visit the fortress personally) and Pandolfo Malatesta, who later took refuge in the fortress, which he had fortified and then used it on several occasions against Cremona. The fifteenth century is remembered as the century of the condottieri (or captains of fortune), and during this period the Fortress of Pontevico hosted many of them.

In 1426, in the early stages of the Wars of Lombardy, the Republic of Venice, led by Carmagnola, invaded the Brescian area and took control of Pontevico Castle. The Serenissima erected and renovated the main fortresses on the Oglio River, therefore those of Orzinuovi, Asola and precisely Pontevico, entrusting their care to a provveditore and a castellan. According to a description from this period, the castle was surrounded by walls and ditches and equipped with bastions and watchtowers, while the town stretched around it, around the provincial road and the ancient parish church named after St. Andrew.

In the early stages of the conflict, no major events are recorded near Pontevico: despite being used by many generals as a base for military operations, its size and armament discouraged captains of fortune, who hesitated to besiege its fortress.

It was with the fifth and final phase that the castle again became the scene of clashes. On June 8, 1452, following a two-day siege, Francesco Sforza succeeded in bringing the fortress back under the control of the Duchy of Milan, being able to rely on a large number of men and the use of bombards.

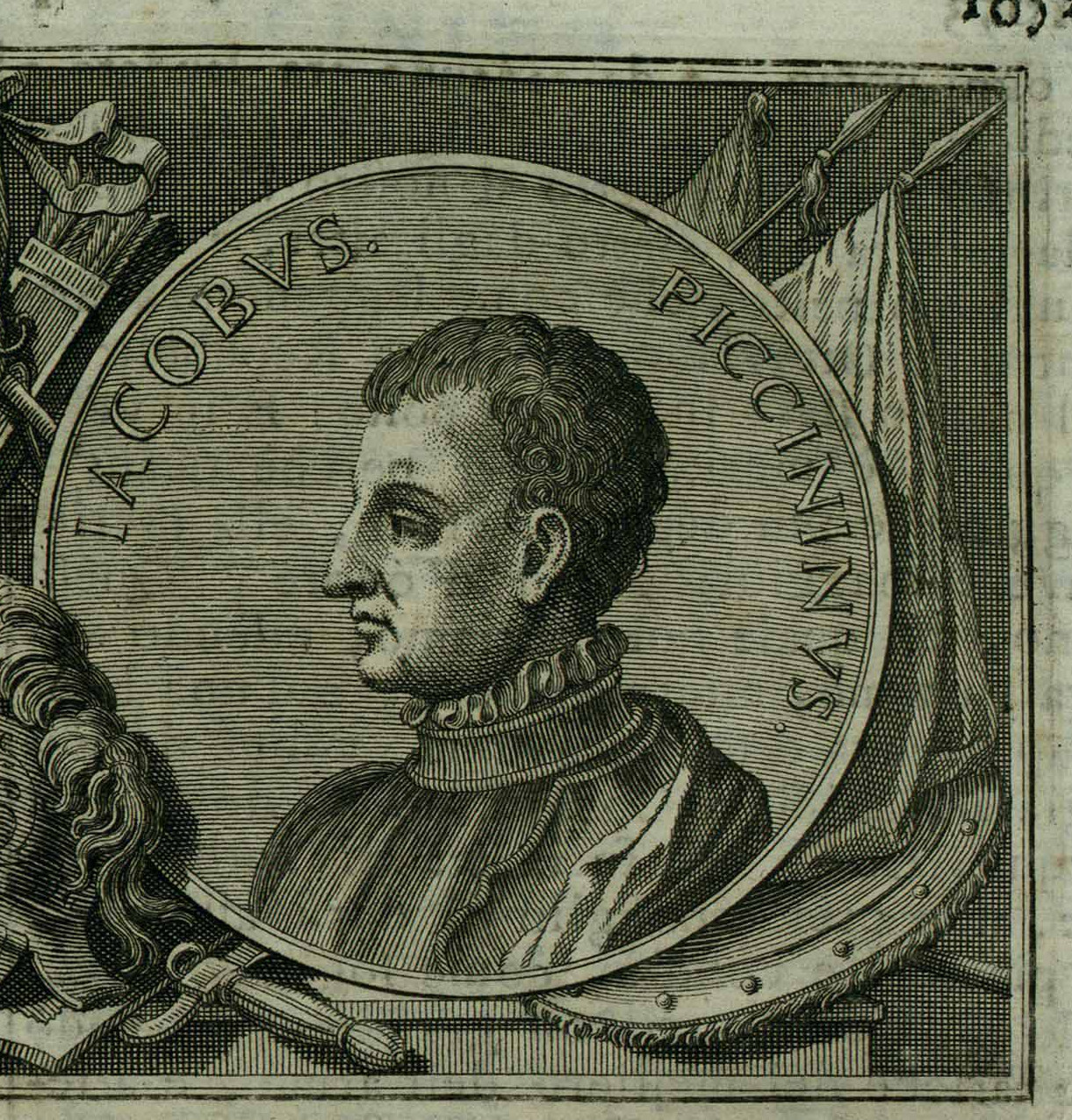
Jacopo Piccinino, commanding the Venetian Army during the last phase of the Wars of Lombardy. Previously, he also served the Duchy of Milan and the Kingdom of Naples.

In May 1453, Jacopo Piccinino, commanding the Venetians, besieged the fortress, trying to make use of the surprise-effect employed by Sforza the previous year. However, after three days of siege, the castle was still in the hands of the five hundred garrison men placed in the fortress. Thus, Piccinino on the morning of the 29th incited the people to the undertaking, who, by moving all their weapons in the direction of a single bulwark, succeeded in opening a breach there and penetrating the castle. At this point, in June, after several skirmishes consummated in the woods near Pontevico, the Venetian general tried, starting from Pontevico, to attack the Sforza, placed with his men on the right bank of the Oglio. Thus he again incited the people:

Now is the time, O captains, now is the time, that with the help of Heaven we put an end to this war, finally attacking our enemies, while the unwary do not expect it. Nothing can prevent us from advancing against them, penetrating into their quarters, shooting them down and setting them on fire: there is no doubt that all soldiers and captains will become our prisoners: what more! Sforza himself, if fortune comes our way, will be ours; and returning victorious to our tents we shall fill them all with abundant enemy spoils. I know well, that if the Duke foresaw what determination we have, and our arrival there at his camp, he would be willing to receive us with arms: but are we not far more valiant than his soldiers? Would we for that reason hesitate to burst boldly against his people? By us all rushing together against them, we also know that they will undoubtedly be vanquished, and almost crushed.

— Jacopo Piccinino, speech

Of the 52 cohorts he possessed in the camp, he armed 36, which at night crossed the Oglio and penetrated the Cremonese countryside. Later, Piccinino himself crossed the river with an army consisting of 5,000 infantrymen, 1,000 archers, and 500 riflemen, slingers, and other artillerymen. The assault proved unsuccessful and the Venetians were pushed back across the river, finding themselves forced to return to Pontevico.

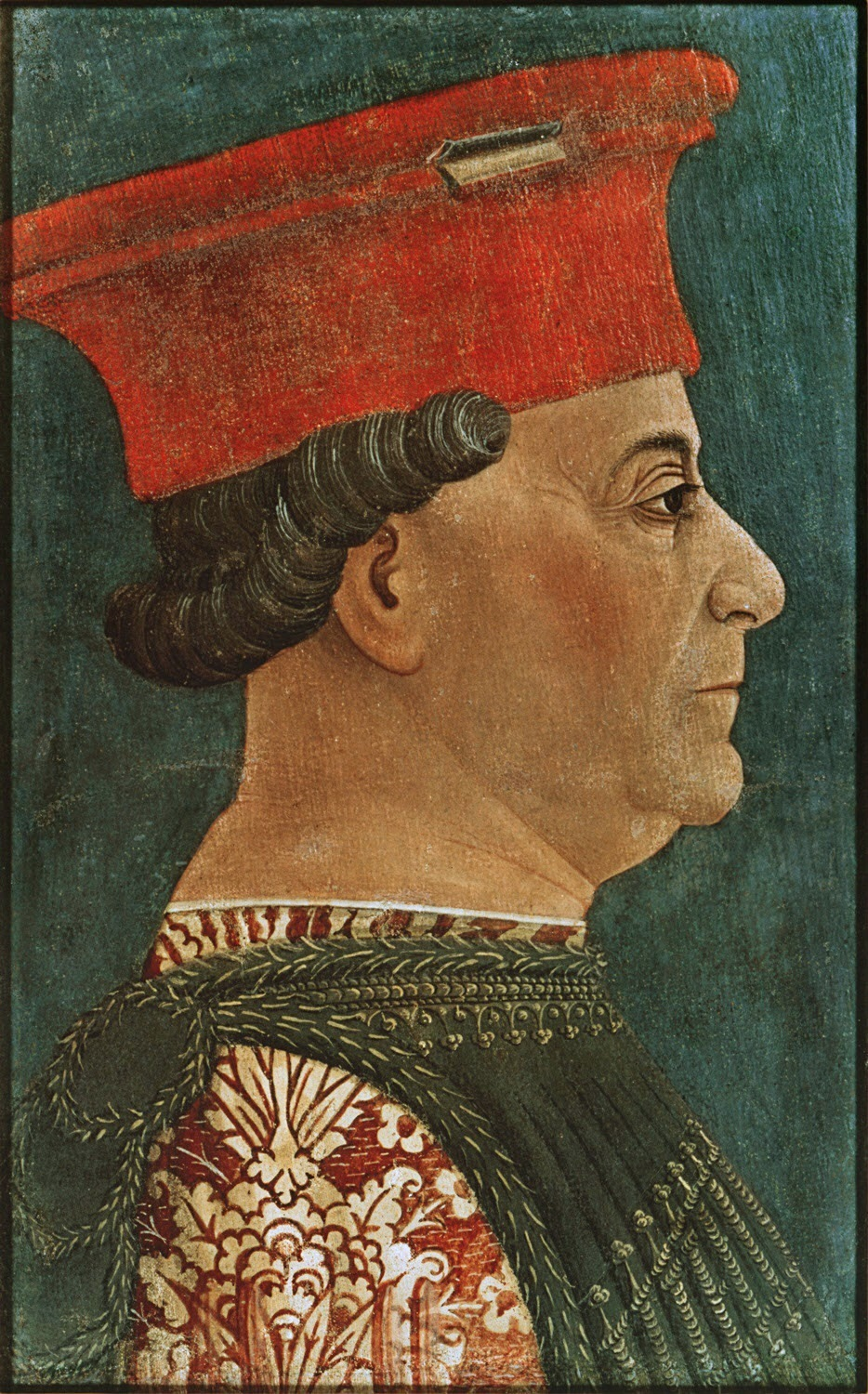
Francesco Sforza, Duke of Milan from 1450 to 1466, victoriously besieged Pontevico twice. Previously, he also served the Kingdom of Naples, the Papal States, the Republics of Lucca and Florence, and Venice itself.

In August, from Pontevico (which had become his base for military expeditions) Jacopo Piccinino moved to defend Ghedi, to no avail as it was conquered by Milanese forces.

In the fall, Francesco Sforza received reinforcements from Tuscany and France, rejoining his ally René of Anjou. In all, the army of the Franco-Milanese encamped at Seniga rose to a total of about twenty thousand infantrymen and three thousand five hundred cavalrymen. Armed with an overwhelming numerical superiority, the men led by the Duke and Count of Anjou quickly encircled and, on October 16, besieged Pontevico. The castle fell into Franco-Milanese hands at 10 p.m. on October 19, after more than three days and two nights of siege. The occupiers (especially the Transalpines) were particularly ruthless toward the vanquished: having carried out looting, marked by brutal cruelty against civilians, the town, including the castle, was burned and razed to the ground.

With the Peace of Lodi, Pontevico returned as part of the Republic of Venice, which rebuilt the town and the castle in the following years, starting the construction of two new towers on May 18, 1457. Precisely because of the loyalty shown by the people of Pontevico to the Serenissima, the town was nicknamed Castello.

In 1483, during the Salt War, there were armed incidents near Pontevico, between Sanseverino (a Venetian general) and the Duke of Calabria Alfonso of Aragon. However, the forces captained by the Duke of Calabria, being aware that Pontevico Castle was heavily fortified and well defended, did not attack it. On the contrary, they headed for the fortresses of Ghedi, Bagnolo, Montechiaro and Asola, which were conquered, albeit briefly; the Venetian army regained the lost castles and, by building a bridge across the river at Pontevico, invaded the Cremona countryside. The war closed the following year with a peace signed at Bagnolo.

=== The Modern Age ===
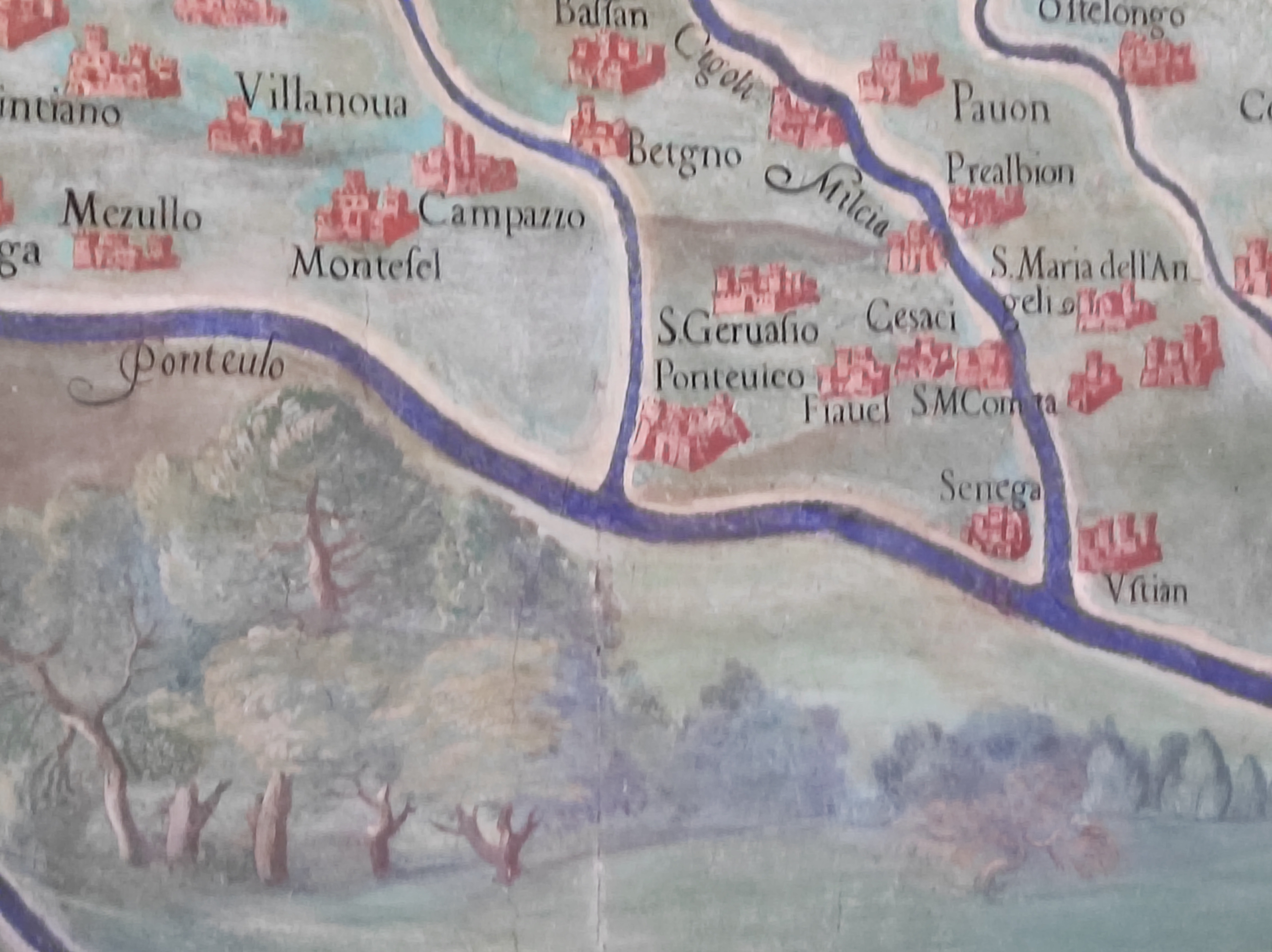
Pontevico Castle depicted in the Gallery of Maps, made between 1581 and 1583 in the Vatican Museums.

==== Italian wars ====
In 1498, because of Louis XII's dynastic claims on the Duchy of Milan, Duke Ludovico il Moro decided to send 400 men inside the Cremonese castles in order to defend Robecco d'Oglio.

In 1499, almost half a century after its destruction, the bridge over the Oglio was rebuilt. That same year, because of the oppressive behavior of the Milanese government toward the Cremonese, several times the latter came to Pontevico to talk with the castellan or chaplain about a hypothetical Invasion of Cremona, for the latter's passage to the Serenissima. The invasion took place, however, not starting from Pontevico but rather from Soncino, and quite smoothly the entire County of Cremona became part of the Serenissima, to the point that on September 10, 1499, the raising of the gonfalon of Saint Mark in the city is remembered. The favorable moment was short-lived and, in January 1500, the Duke explicitly declared that he wanted to retake Cremona; in prompt response, however, the Rectors of Brescia sent 22,000 soldiers to Pontevico, ready to march to the city if necessary. More than ten thousand infantrymen, archers, crossbowmen, riflemen and bombardiers moved toward Cremona, entering and restoring calm to the city.

Realizing that Venetian expansion in the Italian peninsula was a problem for their expansionist aims, King Louis XII of France, King Ferdinand II of Spain and Emperor Maximilian I, with the support of Pope Julius II, on December 10 came together in the League of Cambrai, aimed at defeating the Serenissima. The danger to the Venetian Republic was imminent, so the Venetian Senate immediately ordered the land army to assemble right in Pontevico, while inside the Castle, which by now for centuries had been the most fortified and defended in the Brescian area, the army leaders gathered, including Nicolò Orsini, Bartolomeo di Alviano, Andrea Gritti, Giorgio Cornaro and Vincenzo Valier. Beginning in April 1509, a massive number of soldiers, between 40,000 and 60,000, assembled in Pontevico, which left the fortress on May 2, aimed at attacking the Milanese.

Despite an initial advance into enemy territory with the capture of Pagazzano Castle, the defeat at Agnadello sent the Venetian army into such a crisis that it seemed that the Venetian Republic was destined to subjugate. As the French troops entered Bergamo, Brescia and Cremona, Pontevico Castle, to show its dedication to the Serenissima, welcomed every escapee, however not for long as it was occupied by the French in June. On the journey from Ghedi to Cremona, the King of France with his court stopped to sleep in Pontevico Castle on June 22.

In 1510, the people of Pontevico, with the support of the castellan, started a major revolt, to the point that the French fled and managed to capture only 14 rioters. The town thus returned to Venetian hands, however, for a short time since as soon as word reached Bologna (headquarters of the French army) of the Venetian reconquest of the Brescian area, the transalpines sent Gaston of Foix-Nemours to conquer Brescia and Gian Giacomo Trivulzio to conquer Pontevico Castle. On February 19, 500 of Trivulzio's lancers managed to penetrate the fortress, which was sacked along with the town; on the same day Brescia suffered an even worse fate, so much so that in addition to the looting it also saw numerous massacres towards civilians and priests in the temples, in what is remembered as the Sack of Brescia.

Meanwhile, as a result of the formation of the Holy League (formed by the Papal State, the Republic of Venice, the Spanish Empire and the Swiss Cantons), the fortunes of the war reversed and France found itself in defensive position, placing the bulk of its army just inside the fortress of Pontevico. However, Ludovico's army soon learned that it was being pursued by a massive Venetian army, abandoning the castle which was set on fire and leaving behind the ruins of the bridge over the Oglio, which was destroyed to keep the Venetians from passing, and they rebuilt it as soon as they reached the town. Pontevico, again, was used by the Serenissima as a base for the reconquest of Brescia, to the point that the commander Leonardo Emo regrouped 2,000 infantrymen and 500 cavalrymen there, to which the entire army of the Seignory was later added. During this period, the Milanese and Swiss attempted to cross the Oglio at Pontevico but were repelled by the castellans.

After an alliance between France and Venice had been signed on March 24, 1513, troops destined for the Invasion of Cremona were assembled in the castle in May, and on May 27, under the command of Bartolomeo di Alviano, they brought the city back under the control of the Serenissima, while Brescia and Bergamo were recaptured and the French took control of Soncino and Lodi.

However, defeat at the Battle of Novara reversed the fortunes of the war, so much so that the Venetians abandoned Bresciano, which was completely occupied by the Spanish army. The Fortress of Pontevico, defended by 300 men, managed to resist the Spaniards led by Antonio de Leyva. Not even in July, as the Iberians rejoined their Milanese and German allies, did the castle fall, to the point that the besiegers were driven from the fortress. At that point, the besiegers decided to apply the tactic of isolation, with the aim of forcing the Pontevichesi to surrender for lack of food and supplies. And, despite a resistance that lasted until mid-August, so it happened. The castellan was forced, partly because of the plague that was spreading through the territory, to come to terms, as Marin Sanudo the Younger recalls:

[...] and they say they could no longer hold on, because the plague was already inside. [...]

— Marino Sanuto the Younger, Diaries of Marino Sanuto

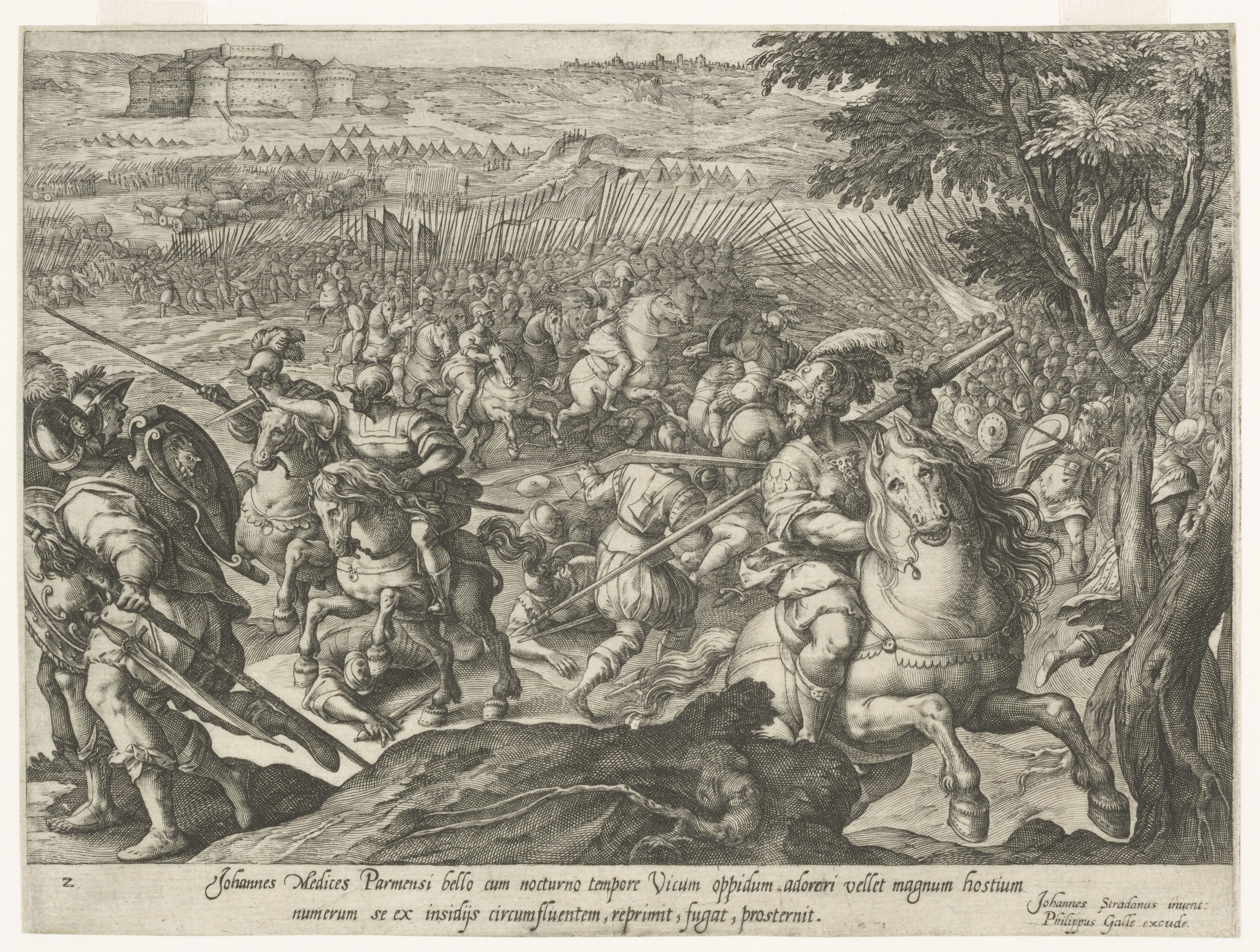
Painting by Jan van der Straet: 1520s, Giovanni dalle Bande Nere fights near Pontevico. However, the clash did not involve the castle.

For three years Pontevico was under Spanish rule, when in May 1516 the Venetians, led by Odet of Foix (sent by King Francis I of France), reconquered Brescia and with it its territory, which had been completely abandoned by the occupants.

The castle was no longer affected by fighting until the end of the conflict, reached with the Peace of Cambrai.

In 1529, a descent into the Brescian area by the Landsknechts is recorded, who sacked the province and caused damage to the castles of the Bassa, including that of Pontevico.

==== 16th-18th century ====
A work of enhancement and restoration of the fortress is recorded in the year 1560. It is known that it was particularly appreciated by the people of Brescia due to a decree of the then Captain of the City Giovanni Matteo Bembo:

Since many works have been done for the Municipality of Pontevico to the Fortress of this Land for the benefit of our Most Illustrious Lordship, and since it is an honorable thing that they be satisfied, by the terms of the present decree we order the Agents and Mayors of this Territory, that having seen the present decree they should do to the said Municipality of Pontevico all the works that they will legitimately show they have done in this Fortress.

— Giovanni Matteo Bembo, decree of May 30, 1560

In 1571, it is recorded that the Serenissima founded the school of bombardiers within the castle.

However, the advancement of military technologies and the increasing introduction of artillery increasingly reduced the importance of castles, which were increasingly vulnerable to new weapons, during this period, and certainly the castle of Pontevico was no exception.

From a description of Pontevico contained in a documentation made in the early 17th century (more precisely, in 1610), it can be deduced what the fortress looked like at that time:

[...] the Bridge is guarded by a very strong Fortress with guards of soldiers, Bombardiers, and a Noble Castellan, where he is dwelling together with all the militia [...] Surrounding this fortress passes N.800, with pits, towers and other things [...] In the land there is a corps of Bombardiers for the service of the saltpeter Fortress.

— Giovanni Dalezze, Brescian Cadastre

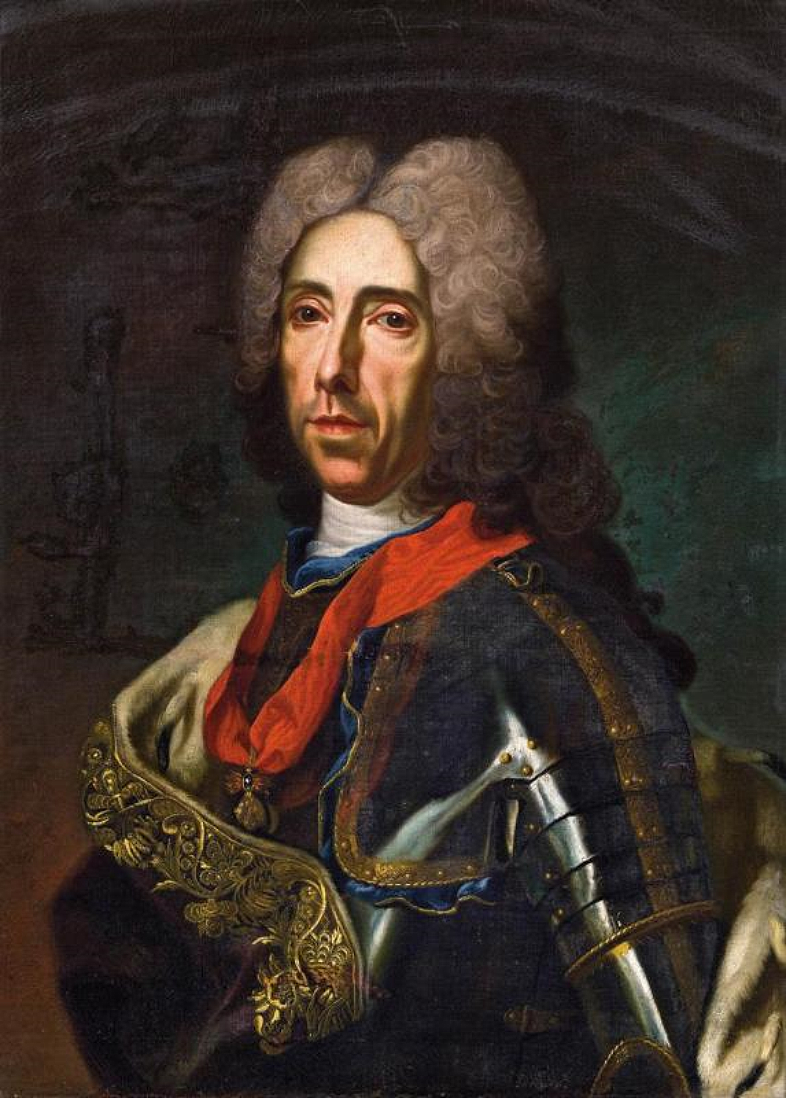
Prince Eugene of Savoy, who stopped at Pontevico, commanded the armed forces of the Archduchy of Austria during the War of the Spanish Succession.

After the castle had not been affected by major clashes for almost two centuries, in 1702, after the victory obtained at Chiari, Eugene of Savoy camped there, with the aim of facing the French forces blockaded in Cremona. Regarding the stopover of the commander of the imperial army, an interesting anecdote exists. The Prince had connected with Don Cozzoli, a Cremonese parish priest, for him to signal the right moment to move his attack toward the city, with the aim of annihilating the French. When the right moment came, the parish priest sent one of his trusted men to Pontevico, placing the letter directed toward Eugene inside the seam of his shoes, prepared for the occasion. In this way, the imperial general was able to enter Cremona in a timely manner, routing the French troops and capturing the commander François de Villeroy, who had been taken right to Pontevico.

=== The end of the strategic function and the 19th century ===
With the fall of the Serenissima in 1797 and the ensuing territorial changes, the castle, already unused for some time, permanently lost its strategic importance.

In 1804, the structure was purchased by Gaetano Pietro Cadolini of Cremona, who opened a foundry there, the first to be opened in Italy after the French Revolution, and had 600,000 weights of hard coal brought in from Istria, recasting more than 400,000 pounds of iron. The forge was equipped with five reverberatory furnaces, used mainly for the production of bullets and tools of war.

At that time the peninsula was under the control of Napoleon, who crowned himself in 1805 in Milan, creating the Kingdom of Italy. For that very occasion, on May 5, 1805, an iron plate was produced in the Pontevico foundry surmounted by a medal depicting the Emperor with his head girded with laurel and around it the inscription Napoleon Emperor of the French and King of Italy. On either side of the medal, a figure of a spearman resting his right foot on the globe and a swaddled woman holding in her hands a cornucopia facing the ground are depicted. An imperial eagle holding a bundle of lightning in its talons surmounts the medal, while on the iron plate is the inscription:

TO THE UNCONQUERED AND IMMORTAL NAPOLEON P.F.A - EMPEROR OF THE FRENCH - KING OF ITALY -
DEITY OF INDEPENDENCE AND CREATOR - G.P. CADOLINO CREMONESE - FIRST WHO DARED TO RECAST IRON IN ITALY -
FOR THE DEFENSE OF THE KINGDOM - THIS UNIQUE INSCRIPTION - DEDICATES AND CONSECRATES

Currently, the slab is stored in the Museums of the Sforza Castle.

In 1816, following the Congress of Vienna, Pontevico became part of the Kingdom of Lombardy-Venetia, dependent on the Austrian Empire. In the same year, the former fortress was visited by the Archduke of Austria.

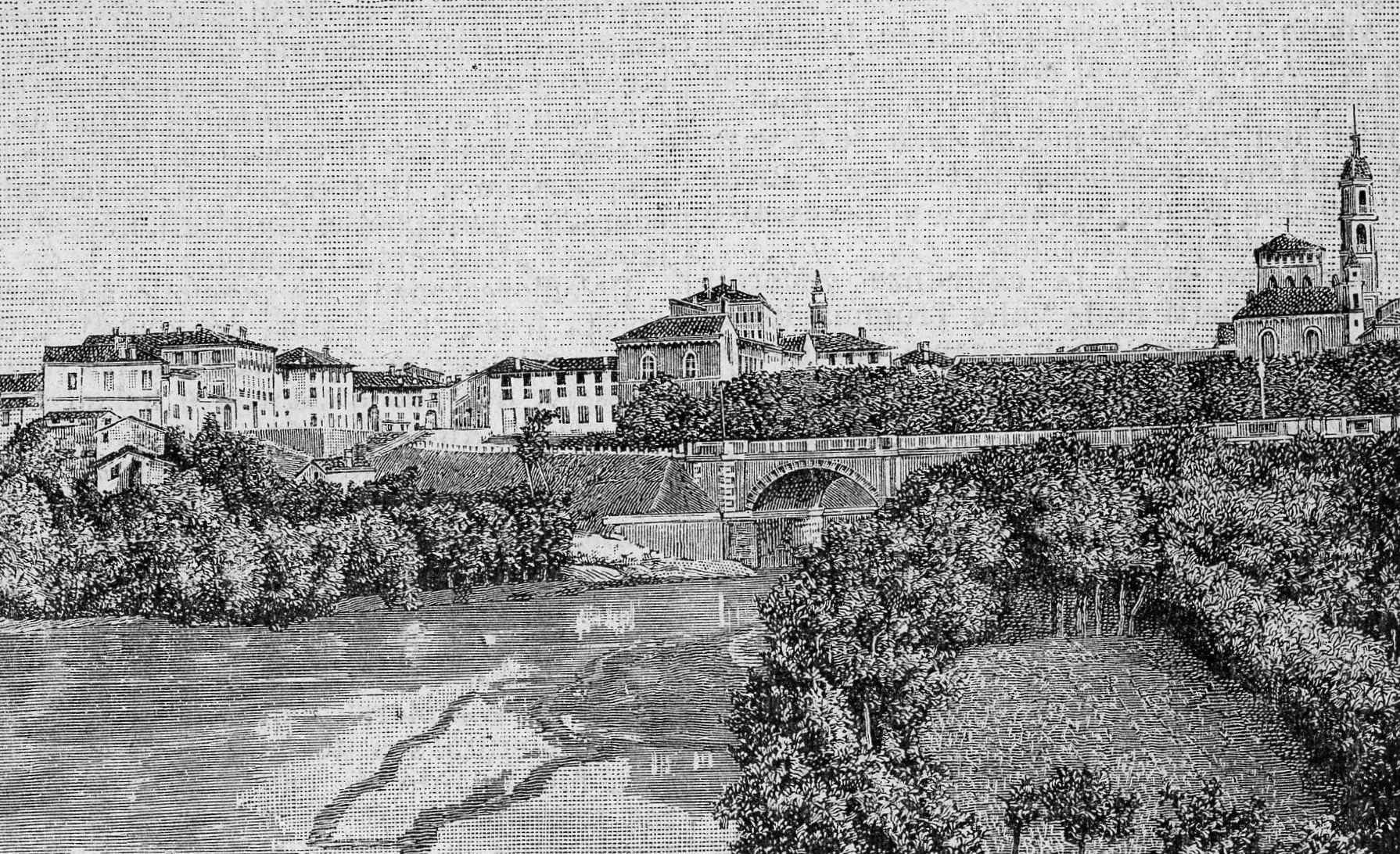
A 19th-century woodcut depicts Pontevico as seen from the other side of the Oglio River: the castle is visible in the incomplete form that has marked it for more than half a century.

During the 1840s, after the foundry ceased operations at the end of the following decade, the German Kewmüller purchased the castle, which he had completely demolished in the spring of 1844; during the demolition work, the old secret passageway that passed under the bed of the Oglio River was obstructed. Work on the construction of a new castle in neo-Gothic forms, intended to house commercial and industrial activities, proceeded with great urgency; however, with the 1848 Riots, work came to a halt. With the death of Prince Kewmüller, his successors did not care to continue the work. Only two of the four wings had been erected; the others were never built again.

=== The Bassano Cremonesini Neuropsychiatric Institute ===
On Feb. 6, 1900, for 26,200 liras, Monsignor Cremonesini, together with Don Paolo Roda and Don Luigi Fossati, purchased the castle and placed his institute headquarters there. At that time, decades of economic shortages had spread cretinism and pellagra in the area, especially toward the peasant population. Therefore, the abbot's idea was precisely to set up premises for the reception of sick persons who, because of the nature of their ailments and the supervision they needed, were rejected by other institutes. On March 18, 1901, the Institute was officially opened, in what for centuries went down in history for massacres and battles.

In the course of time, an increasing number of villagers devoted themselves to charity, succeeding in providing the institute's residents with a decent life. This was to the point that in 1911, what until then was recognized as a Home became a foundation, named the Rest Home for Phrenastenics and Epileptics in Pontevico. In addition, between 1911 and 1912 the abbot had the castle quadrangle completed.

Bassano Cremonesini's activity continued (and still continues) with his successors. In particular, in the Second Postwar period, Abbot Giuseppe Miglioli had a series of two-story buildings erected, expanding the structure with the aim of accommodating residents suffering from TB and creating new spaces dedicated to services. Under the presidency of Angelo Crescenti, in 1962 the pavilion erected by Miglioli was replaced with a more spacious one, circular in shape and on three floors; it was designed to be completely autonomous from the other wards and is still equipped with radiology, clinical analysis laboratory, physical therapy room and E.E.G. laboratory.

However, during the 1960s, the problem related to the shortage of nuns within the facility led to a drastic reduction in the number of admissions (which numbered about six hundred in 1962), with the simultaneous hiring of specialized lay health personnel. At the same time, due to alarming signs of subsidence in the foundations, mainly related to the bombing suffered during World War II, the demolition and reconstruction of the central building took place, with the simultaneous renovation of the entire building.

Meanwhile, in 1966 the then President of the Republic Giuseppe Saragat renamed the facility to the A. Cremonesini Neuropsychiatric Institute:

The Home for Phrenastenic and Epileptic Hospitalization based in Pontevico assumes the name: "A. CREMONESINI" NEUROPSYCHIATRIC INSTITUTE.

— Giuseppe Saragat, decree of november 8, 1966

In 2003, privatization of the facility took place, renamed to Bassano Cremonesini Institute for the Mentally Disabled-Onlus. What had been a foundation since 1911 was thus established as a Private Law Entity, in fulfillment of National Law 328 and Regional Law 1/2003.

== Description ==
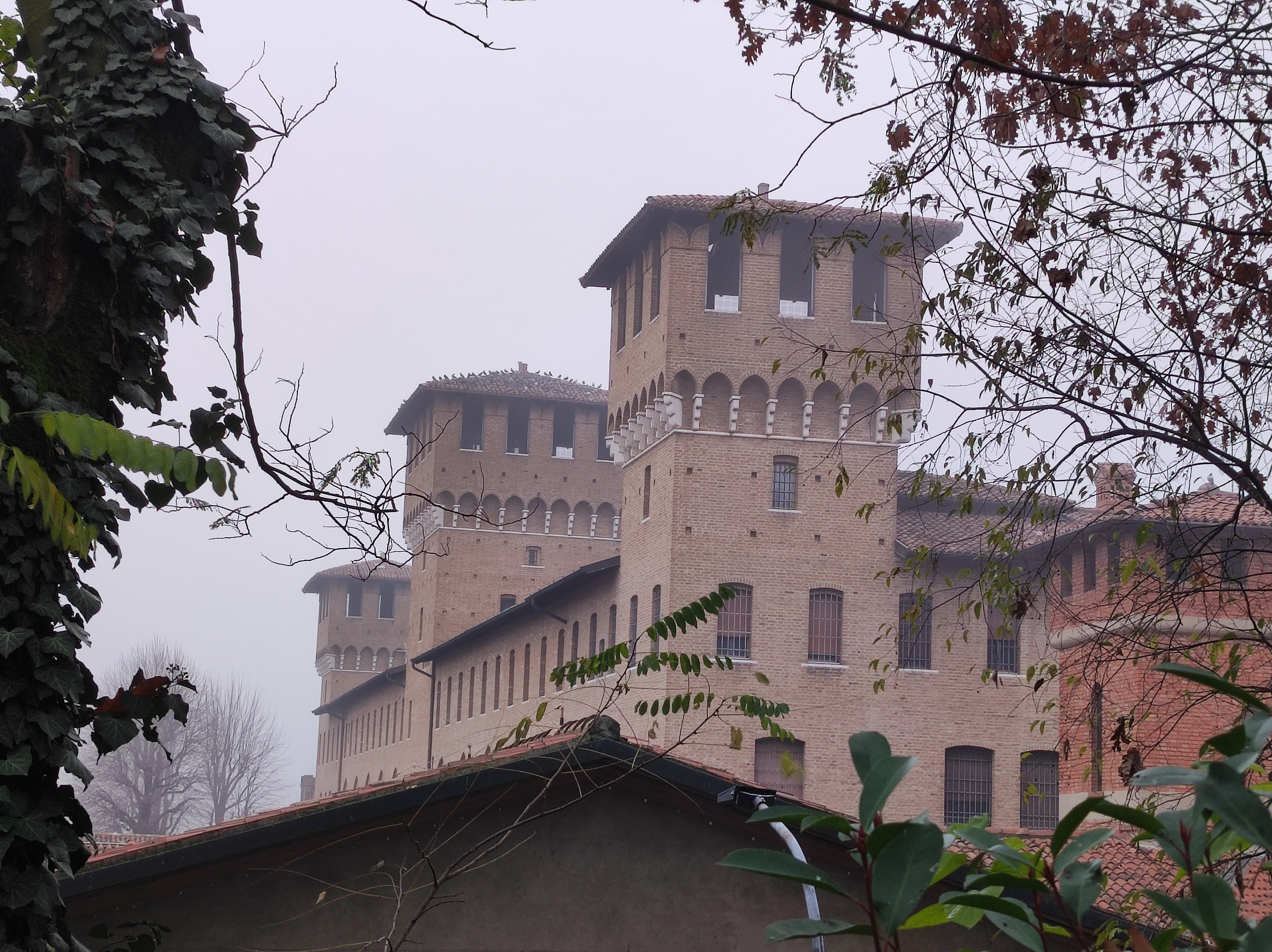
The three towers of the Castle as seen from the public gardens of Mazzini Square.

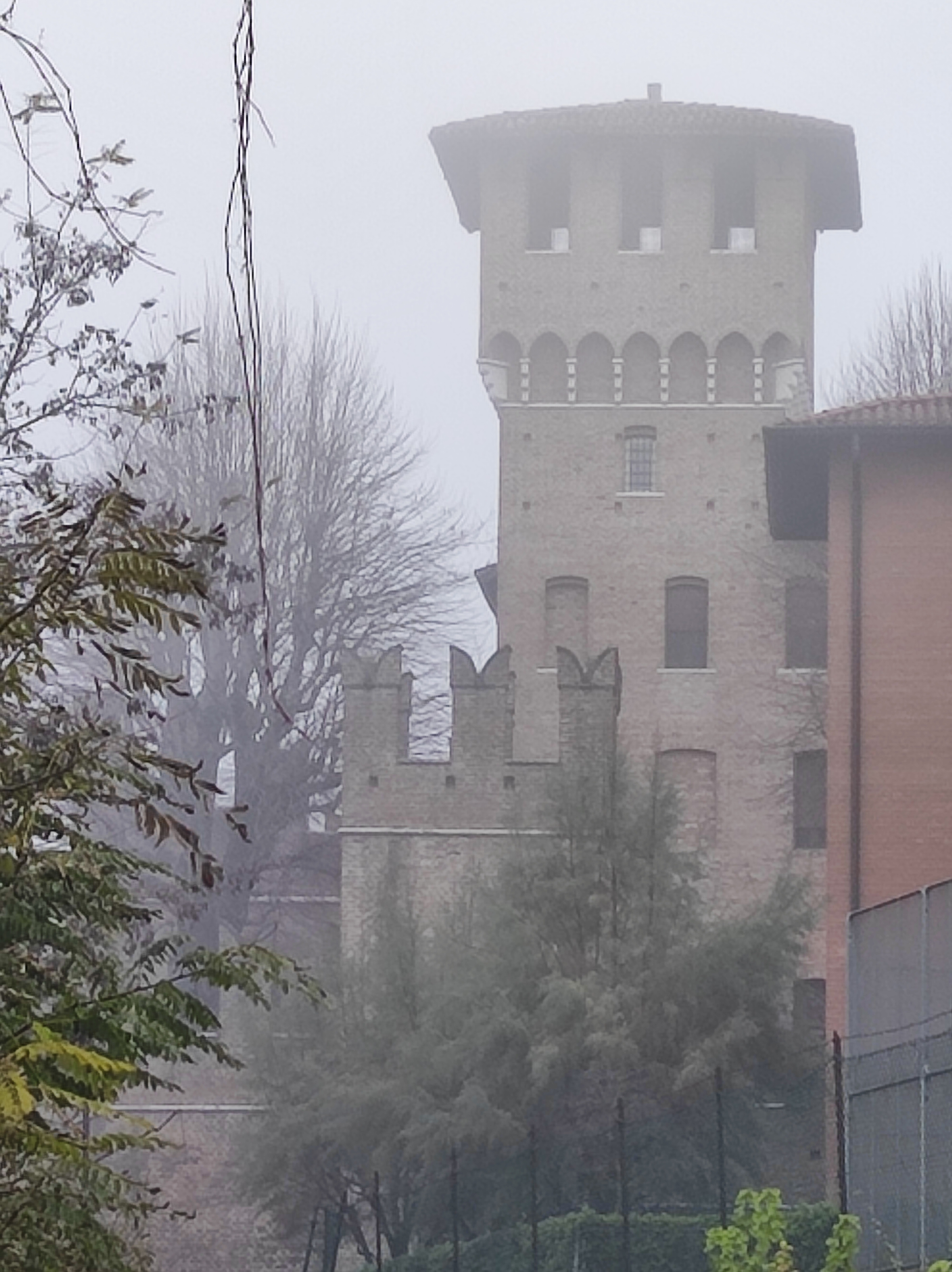
Detail on the merlons of the fortress: note how they are made "dovetailed," and not square-shaped, as they must have looked like during the Middle Ages.

In its present form, the castle possesses its medieval appearance, in Romanesque style and with a quadrangular shape. However, perhaps due to an oversight during the last restoration in the second half of the 20th century, the merlons were made "dovetailed," thus in Ghibelline style, while in the original form they were supposed to be squared, in Guelph style. Positioned toward the Oglio River is a plaque depicting the coat of arms of Pontevico and dating from 1560.

The inner courtyard, surrounded by porticoes around the perimeter, with a loggia, consists of several gardens and contains a small church inside.

=== The church of the Institute ===
It is known that since the time of the Venetian Republic, the castle had a chapel dedicated to St. Mark, the patron saint of the Serenissima; however, since 1815, due to the demolition of the ancient structure, the relics of the shrine have been in a side chapel of the Church of St. Thomas and St. Andrew. The new church dates from 1909, erected at the behest of Monsignor Cremonesini.

The religious structure is placed in the center of the courtyard and is dedicated to the Holy Family; the high altar, on the other hand, is dedicated to Mary of Nazareth, whose simulacrum is placed in the center of the apse.

The small brick church has a gabled facade with a central marble rose window, on which is placed a small bell gable, equipped with two bells. Inside, the main decoration consists of an altarpiece, by Brescian painter Vittorio Trainini, depicting the blessed nun in prostration before Mary holding the child to her.

=== The crypt-monument ===
Next to the small church is a Romanesque-style crypt containing the remains of Bassano Cremonesini, author of the rebirth of the castle, which he transformed into a neuropsychiatric institute.

A trifora provides access to the crypt, whose illumination is made possible by a stained-glass window, on which are two angels bearing a ribbon on which is the inscription Deus caritas est.

The monument consists of a secluded room, the ceiling of which consists of a framed inlay finished in bright colors and intersected by angels bearing inscriptions reflecting the concept of suffrage and eternal repose of the soul; the walls, on the other hand, are decorated with graffiti. The decoration and frescoing of the structure were entrusted to Trainini. On the back wall, Trainini reproduced, on a gold background, the scene of the Resurrection of Christ; on the same wall, there is a depiction representing four Angels holding up the four main works accomplished by the Monsignor, the Abbey Church, the Neuropsychiatric Institute, the Cemetery Obelisk and the Canossian Institute, as if to invoke the resurrection of the one who accomplished so many beneficial works.

The vault of the central part of the crypt is a single fresco depicting Gospel symbols on the sides and a large crucifix in the center on a gilded cross. In this area of the monument is the sarcophagus: it is a block of red Verona marble, solemn in its simplicity, as its only ornament is a cross worked with precious pearls and the gilded inscription:

To Monsignor Abbot Bassano Cremonesini.

By the work of sculptor Claudio Botta, the image of the venerable Priest is recalled on the sarcophagus, depicted as gently sleeping and smiling.

== See also ==
- Pontevico

== Bibliography ==
- Giuseppe Fusari (1999). L'ISTITUTO NEUROPSICHIATRICO CREMONESINI. Manerbio.
- Angelo Berenzi (1888). Storia di Pontevico. Cremona.
- Carla Milanesi (1980). Storia di Pontevico. Brescia.
- A. Muzzi; B. Tomaselli; A. Tori (1990). "III". Sigilli di Enti Civili. Firenze.
- Giuseppe Fusari (2008). FILANTROPIA E CARITA'.
