= Third siege of Pontevico =

Coordinates: 45.271389°N 10.085°E

- Part of Wars in Lombardy
| Date | 16–19 October 1453 |
| Location | Pontevico, Lombardy |
| Result | Milanese victory |

Belligerents
| Duchy of Milan; Kingdom of France | Republic of Venice |

Commanders and leaders
| Francesco Sforza; René of Anjou | Jacopo Piccinino |

Units involved
| 20,000 infantrymans 3,500 knights | Some hundred of soldiers Inhabitants of Pontevico |

The third siege of Pontevico was fought between 16 and 19 October 1453 at Pontevico (Lombardy) between the armies of the Duchy of Milan and that of Republic of Venice, an episode of the Wars in Lombardy.

== Background ==
During the fifth and last phase of the Wars in Lombardy, in 1452 the Province of Brescia was invaded and conquered by the Milanese army, commanded by Francesco Sforza, the Duke of Milan. In the next year, Jacopo Piccinino (at the head of the Serenissima's army), brought back Pontevico after four days of siege.

During the summer, the Venetian army, camped at Pontevico, attacked many time the Milanese one, situated in his strongholds of Seniga and Robecco d'Oglio, without ever getting an important win. Then, in August after the Battle of Ghedi the Duke got an important win against Piccinino before the autumn, taking control of Ghedi and the Bassa Bresciana Orientale.

In October, Francesco Sforza conjoined with René of Anjou, King of Naples and Count of Anjou, in addition to being commander of the French Army. So, the combined Franco-Milanese army could count on about 25,000 soldiers, and started encircling Pontevico.

== Order of Battle ==
=== Duchy of Milan ===
The combined army of the Duke of Milan and the Count of Anjou counted 20,000 infantrymen and 3,500 knights.

=== Republic of Venice ===
Jacopo Piccinino could count on few hundreds of soldiers located into the Castle of Pontevico to which were added the Pontevico inhabitants, who supported Serenissima.

== Battle ==
On October 16, the combined Franco-Milanese army started besieging the Castle of Pontevico. The milanese bombards hit hard the fortress' bastions, indeed after two days of siege some Sforza's soldiers saw an opening in the defensive walls and tried to enter in the castle, failing. In the same day, the French, until then placed on the right bank of the Oglio, passed the river and intervened on the front line: so, they climbed the steep shore of the river, being in front of the access to the fortress. However, they found the fierce castellans, who pushed them on the other bank of the river after a sword clash.

On October 19, under the Sforza's order, the milanese soldiers launched a heavy assault on a single bastion. Then, when a breach has been opened, the soldiers penetrated in the stronghold and, equipped with all kinds of projectiles, they clashed with the castellans, winning the clash. So, after hours of clash, at 22 P.M. Pontevico fell again under the Duchy of Milan.

== Aftermath ==
After the siege, Pontevico get squab looted, burnt and then razed to the ground. The French soldiers were particularly evil, committing many brutal cruelties over the inhabitants. The word spread throughout the territory and in the next 8 days many towns located in province of Brescia surrendered.

In the early 1454, the situation get upset: the French soldiers, jaded by the war, peeved due to the continuous clashes with the milanese ones and aware of the fact that their tactics were inferior to the Italian ones, decided to leave the war, with the accord of the Count of Anjou. So, the French army left the war and Milan and Venice decided to achieve peace. In April, they reached the Treaty of Lodi, who put an end to the wars in Lombardy.
