= First siege of Pontevico =

Coordinates: 45.271389°N 10.085°E

- Part of Wars in Lombardy
Date	6–8 June 1452
Location	Pontevico, Lombardy
Result	Milanese victory

Belligerents
Duchy of Milan	Republic of Venice

The first siege of Pontevico was fought between 6 and 8 June 1452 at Pontevico (Lombardy) between the armies of the Duchy of Milan and that of Republic of Venice, an episode of the Wars in Lombardy.

== Background ==
During the Wars in Lombardy, Brescia and its province was conquered by the Republic of Venice. In 1448, Venice and Milan stipulated a truce: then, Francesco Sforza, a Milanese commander, besieged Milan and took the power on February 26, 1452. Due to his past service for the Republic of Venice, he knew the strategic importance of Pontevico, located long the Oglio river and he decided to besiege his castle.

== Order of Battle ==
=== Duchy of Milan ===
Francesco Sforza could count on a big part of his army.

=== Republic of Venice ===
The Venetian forces in Pontevico were exiguous. However, the people of Ponteviche, trusting in their own valor, wanted to attempt resistance in any way.

== Battle ==
After having built a bridge over the river and set up a camp on both Oglio shores, on June 6 the Milanese began the siege of the fortress; the bombardments were aimed against the bastions of the castle while Sforza ordered the guerrillas not to give the castle lords any respite. In fact, the duke feared that reinforcements would arrive from Venice in the future. This was, on the contrary, the hope of the castellans, which vanished after two days of repeated attacks, when the Pontevichesi signed the surrender with the Milanese.

== Aftermath ==
During the siege of Pontevico, the venetian army passed the Oglio river near Soncino and conquered the County of Cremona. After a winter rest, in March 1453 the war started again. On May 29th, Jacopo Piccinino brought back Pontevico under Serenissima. In October, Francesco Sforza joined with René of Anjou and his army, besieged the castle again, which fell on the third day and was destroyed with the whole village.

In the end, with the Peace of Lodi Pontevico returned under Republic of Venice which rebuilt the town and his fortress.
