= Persico Dosimo =

Persico Dosimo Pérsec Dóseem (Lombard)
- Comune
- Comune di Persico Dosimo
- Coat of arms

- Location within Italy Location within Lombardy
- Coordinates: 45°11′N 10°6′E
- Country: Italy
- Region: Lombardy
- Province: Cremona (CR)
- Frazioni: Bettenesco, Dosimo (municipal seat), Persichello, Persico, Quistro

Government
  - Mayor: Fabrizio Superti

Area
  - Total: 20.61 km^{2} (7.96 sq mi)
- Elevation: 48 m (157 ft)

Population (28 February 2017)
  - Total: 3,368
  - Density: 163.4/km^{2} (423.2/sq mi)
- Demonym: Persichesi
- Time zone: UTC+1 (CET)
  - Summer (DST): UTC+2 (CEST)
- Postal code: 26043
- Dialing code: 0372
- Website: Official website

Persico Dosimo (Cremunés: Pérsec Dóseem) is a comune (municipality) in the Province of Cremona in the Italian region Lombardy, located about 80 kilometres (50 mi) southeast of Milan and about 8 kilometres (5 mi) northeast of Cremona.

Persico Dosimo borders the following municipalities: Castelverde, Corte de' Frati, Cremona, Gadesco-Pieve Delmona, Grontardo, Pozzaglio ed Uniti.

Among the local churches are:

- San Lorenzo, Quistro
- Santi Cosma e Damiano, Persico
- San Giovanni Battista Decollato, Dosimo
