= Felice Guarneri =

Italian economist and politician (1882–1955)

Minister for Exchanges and Currencies
- In office 1937–1939
- Prime Minister: Benito Mussolini

Personal details
- Born: 6 January 1882 Pozzaglio, Kingdom of Italy
- Died: 3 April 1955 (aged 73) Rome, Italy
- Party: National Fascist Party
- Occupation: Academic; Economist

Felice Guarneri (1882–1955) was an Italian economist and politician who served in the cabinet led by Benito Mussolini as the minister for exchanges and currencies between 1937 and 1939.

== Biography ==
Guarneri was born in Pozzaglio on 6 January 1882. In 1906, he graduated in economics from Ca' Foscari University of Venice, with a thesis titled Le basi della rendita ricardiana ed il progresso agricolo, which was published in 1907. He was the professor of economic policy at the University of Genoa from 1909 to 1914. Then he was appointed secretary general of the Union of Chambers of Commerce. In 1920, he was named as the general secretariat of the association of Italian joint-stock companies and later, became its general manager. At the beginning of the 1930s Guarneri was the editor-in-chief of a scholarly journal entitled Rivista di politica economica which supported corporatism. In 1935, he served as the superintendent for exchanges and currencies institution. Next he was appointed its undersecretary and named as the minister for exchanges and currencies which he held between 1937 and 1939. From 1940 to 1944 he was the president of the Banco di Roma.

Guarneri died in Rome on 3 April 1955.

== Views and work ==
Guarneri was a supporter of Fascism, Catholicism, modernity and social conservatism. He published several book on the Italian economy.
