= Second siege of Pontevico =

Coordinates: 45.271389°N 10.085°E

- Part of Wars in Lombardy
Date	25–28 May 1453
Location	Pontevico, Lombardy
Result	Venetian victory

Belligerents
Duchy of Milan	Republic of Venice

Units involved
Around 500 soldiers in the castle	Over 5,000 infantrymen

The second siege of Pontevico was fought between 25 and 29 May 1453 at Pontevico (Lombardy) between the armies of the Duchy of Milan and that of Republic of Venice, an episode of the Wars in Lombardy.

== Background ==
During the fifth phase of the Wars in Lombardy, in June 1452 Pontevico had been besieged and occupied by Francesco Sforza, Duke of Milan. However, before the winter, the Venetian army passed the Oglio river. In March 1453, the Venetians commanded by Jacopo Piccinino started the reconquest of the Bassa Bresciana, reaching the town on 25 May, when the Duke was in Cremona.

== Order of battle ==
=== Duchy of Milan ===
In the Castle of Pontevico was located a garrison of around 500 men.

=== Republic of Venice ===
Jacopo Piccinino could count on over 5000 infantrymen.

== Battle ==
On 25 May Piccinino placed the bombards in front of the castle and he made his men camp along the two banks of the Oglio river, then he started the siege of the fortress. His intention was take the castle before the arrival of Francesco Sforza. The duke, as soon as he learned of the siege, gathered an army in Cremona and headed towards the Castle of Seniga, which was still under his control and where were located many Milanese soldiers, to move to Pontevico encircling the besiegers. But, when Sforza left Cremona, four days of siege had already passed. On the fourth day of siege, 29 May, Jacopo Piccinino decided to incite his soldiers, promising them that, in case of victory, they could loot the town and take revenge on their enemies. So, the Venetians soldiers moved their heavy weapons in front of the castle bastion, launching an attack against that single point of the fortress and opening an opening, where joined the besiegers.

== Aftermath ==
The Venetian soldiers who came into the town, plundered it. The Milanese soldiers were taken prisoner and more unlucky has been thrown in the river.

In the next days, Jacopo Piccinino attempted to launch new attacks over Duke but he never get a win. On 15 August the Milanese army conquered Ghedi Then, in autumn, Francesco Sforza get numerous military reinforcements from France and Florence, conjoining with Renè of Anjou forming an army of around 25.000 among knights and infantrymen: they encircled the town and sieged his castle between 16 and 19 October, conquering it after three days of siege.
