= Pozzaglio ed Uniti =

- Comune
- Comune di Pozzaglio ed Uniti
- Location within Italy Location within Lombardy
- Coordinates: 45°12′N 10°3′E
- Country: Italy
- Region: Lombardy
- Province: Cremona (CR)

Government
  - Mayor: Biondo Caruccio

Area
  - Total: 20.4 km^{2} (7.9 sq mi)
- Elevation: 60 m (200 ft)

Population (28 February 2017)
  - Total: 1,473
  - Density: 72.2/km^{2} (187/sq mi)
- Demonym: Pozzagliesi
- Time zone: UTC+1 (CET)
  - Summer (DST): UTC+2 (CEST)
- Postal code: 26010
- Dialing code: 0372

Pozzaglio ed Uniti (Cremunés: Pusài) is a comune (municipality) in the Province of Cremona in the Italian region Lombardy, located about 80 kilometres (50 mi) southeast of Milan and about 8 kilometres (5 mi) north of Cremona.

Pozzaglio ed Uniti borders the following municipalities: Casalbuttano ed Uniti, Castelverde, Corte de' Frati, Olmeneta, Persico Dosimo, Robecco d'Oglio.

== History ==
During the Roman era Pozzaglio ed Uniti (lat. Plaxanus) was crossed by the Via Brixiana, a Roman consular road which connected Cremona (lat. Cremona) to Brescia (lat. Brixia), from which Roman roads passed and then branched out towards the entire Cisalpine Gaul.

== Churches ==
- San Lorenzo
