= Corte de' Frati =

Corte de' Frati Curt de Fràat (Lombard)
- Comune
- Comune di Corte de' Frati
- Location within Italy Location within Lombardy
- Coordinates: 45°13′N 10°06′E
- Country: Italy
- Region: Lombardy
- Province: Cremona (CR)
- Frazioni: Alfiano, Aspice, Grumone, San Sillo

Government
  - Mayor: Giuseppe Rossetti (lista civica)

Area
  - Total: 20 km^{2} (7.7 sq mi)
- Elevation: 51 m (167 ft)

Population (31 December 2019)
  - Total: 1,359
  - Density: 68/km^{2} (180/sq mi)
- Demonym: Cortefratensi
- Time zone: UTC+1 (CET)
  - Summer (DST): UTC+2 (CEST)
- Postal code: 26010
- Dialing code: 0372
- Patron saint: Ss. Filippo e Giacomo
- Website: Official website

Corte de' Frati (Cremunés: Curt de Fràat) is a municipality (comune) in the province of Cremona, in the Lombardy Italian region.

== History ==
The main history of Corte de' Frati is related to the establishment of the Court of Alfiano. In fact, the original name of the municipality was Court of Alfiano, a name referring to a patrician family who owned these lands.

=== 10th century ===
After the extinction of the Carolingian and the Saxon dynasty, the 10th century was the era of castles and fortress, and the population had to face wars provoked by the Counts. From 950 to 1000, the Bresciani and Cremonesi Counts fought among the lands of the river Oglio, near Bordolano and Canneto, because the Bresciani imposed taxes on the Cremonesi's lands. During this period, the castle of Corte De' Frati was born, but now it does not exist anymore.

On 1004, Henry II conquered Brescia and the Court of Alfiano belonged to the Santa Giulia Monastery in Brescia.

=== 13th century ===
During the 13th century, a bridge was built by the Cremonesi people near Grumone, a frazione of the nowadays Corte de' Frati, in order not to pay the toll bridge enforced by the Bresciani on the bridge of Pontevico. This new project gave life to a war between the two dynasties: in 1213 the Bresciani ordered to the Cremonesi that the bridge was to be destroyed because it was built on the Brescian territory. The bridge, however, was not destroyed until 1228, when Alfiano was assaulted by an armed conflict between Bresciani and Cremonesi, during which the majority of warriors died and those who survived were imprisoned. Afterwards, the two dynasties did not resume their hostilities for a long time because in 1237 the territory was occupied by Frederick II, who used the contested bridge to move easily around Cremonese territory.

In the first half of the 13th century, under the pontificate of Pope Innocent III, the Italian religious order of Humiliati was born and in 1246 they held the Saint Abbondio Church in Cremona. The Humiliati also took possession of Alfiano, whose name was transformed into Corte de' Frati.

=== 14th century ===
During the 14th century, the raids by the Bresciani on the territory started again, and the Cremonesi's raids were mostly done in Pontevico. The city of Cremona strengthened the cities near the Oglio river to avoid new conflicts.

In 1324, Louis IV reconfirmed to the Cremonesi all the privileges and rights previously granted by their predecessors. This event led to new hostilities and disagreements with the Bresciani. Facing a rivalry that was never going to end, the archbishop of Milan Giovanni Visconti issued a law stating that the toll fee of Pontevico's bridge was unmodifiable.

=== 15th century ===
The beginning of the 15th century faced a new armed conflict between the lord of Brescia Pandolfo Malatesta, and the lord of Cremona Cabrino Fondulo. Pandolfo came to the Cremonese territory with an army and took possession of Robecco, Alfiano, Corte de' Frati and other villages near the Oglio river. In 1413 a peace treaty was signed and the Cremonesi reclaimed their lands. At the end of the century, however, the Republic of Venice conquered Brescia and Cremona.

=== 17th century ===
After the suppression of the Humiliati at the beginning of the 17th century, in 1614 the pope Paul V ordered the establishment of the Perpetual Vicar. In this period the world was facing the bubonic plague, and in 1630 Corte de' Frati registered 253 deaths, which was a high number considering that the inhabitants were only 1,000. Facing a high number of deaths, the parish decided to build a new cemetery, because the bodies used to be buried near to the church.

In 1648, a trench called "Trincerone" was built by the Marquis Caracena, governor of Milan, to avoid the siege of Cremona by the French. It started from Cremona and ended in Grumone, and it was 10 miles long. In the same year, however, the Cremonesi managed to free the city from the French siege.

The municipality of Pontevico persisted with the toll bridge, and this inevitably led people coming from the Cremonese territory to use the river from Alfiano to avoid the tax fee. In April 1671 the city of Brescia issued a proclamation suspending the use of the river as a way to avoid the Pontevico's bridge.

In 1683 the present-day church of Corte de' Frati was built above the old castle's foundation.

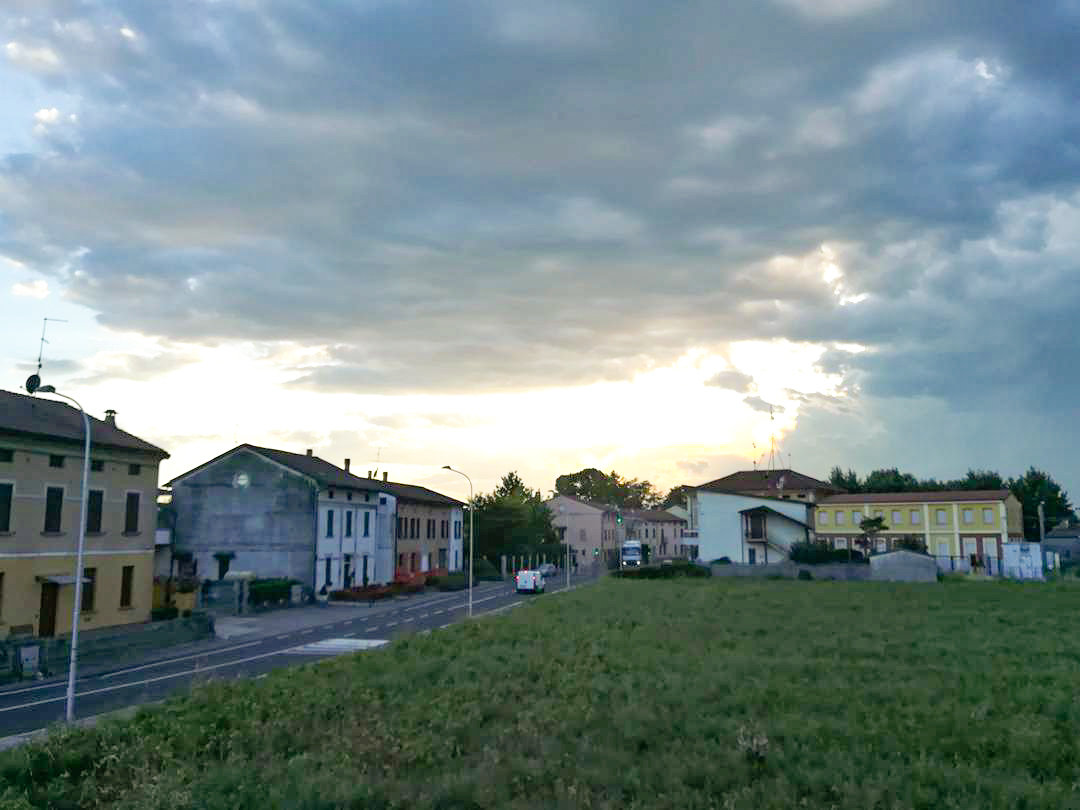
Corte de' Frati.

=== 18th century ===
At the beginning of the 18th century, the municipality was hit by a very high mortality rate of bovine animals. Meanwhile, the lands of Grumone, Corte de' Frati and Robecco were continuously damaged by the raids. From 1777 to 1780 there was a high rate of famine, and the century ended again with an epizootic.

=== 19th century ===
The 19th century started with the French conquering Cremona and its territories, and they also took refuge on Corte de' Frati for three months. In 1802 an earthquake hit the municipality and the church was damaged. During these period, thanks to Napoleon, the streets were fixed and a postal service was activated. Corte de' Frati, Alfiano, and Aspice relied on the municipality of Robecco.

In 1816 there was a high rate of drought that led to famine, and the following year the petechial typhus was spreading through the peasants. This disease was probably caused by the previously mentioned famine, and the deaths were almost 150. In 1867 a cholera outbreak was registered once again. In the same year, the rail line Cremona-Brescia was built, and the river Oglio lost his main function of trade exchange.

== Economy ==
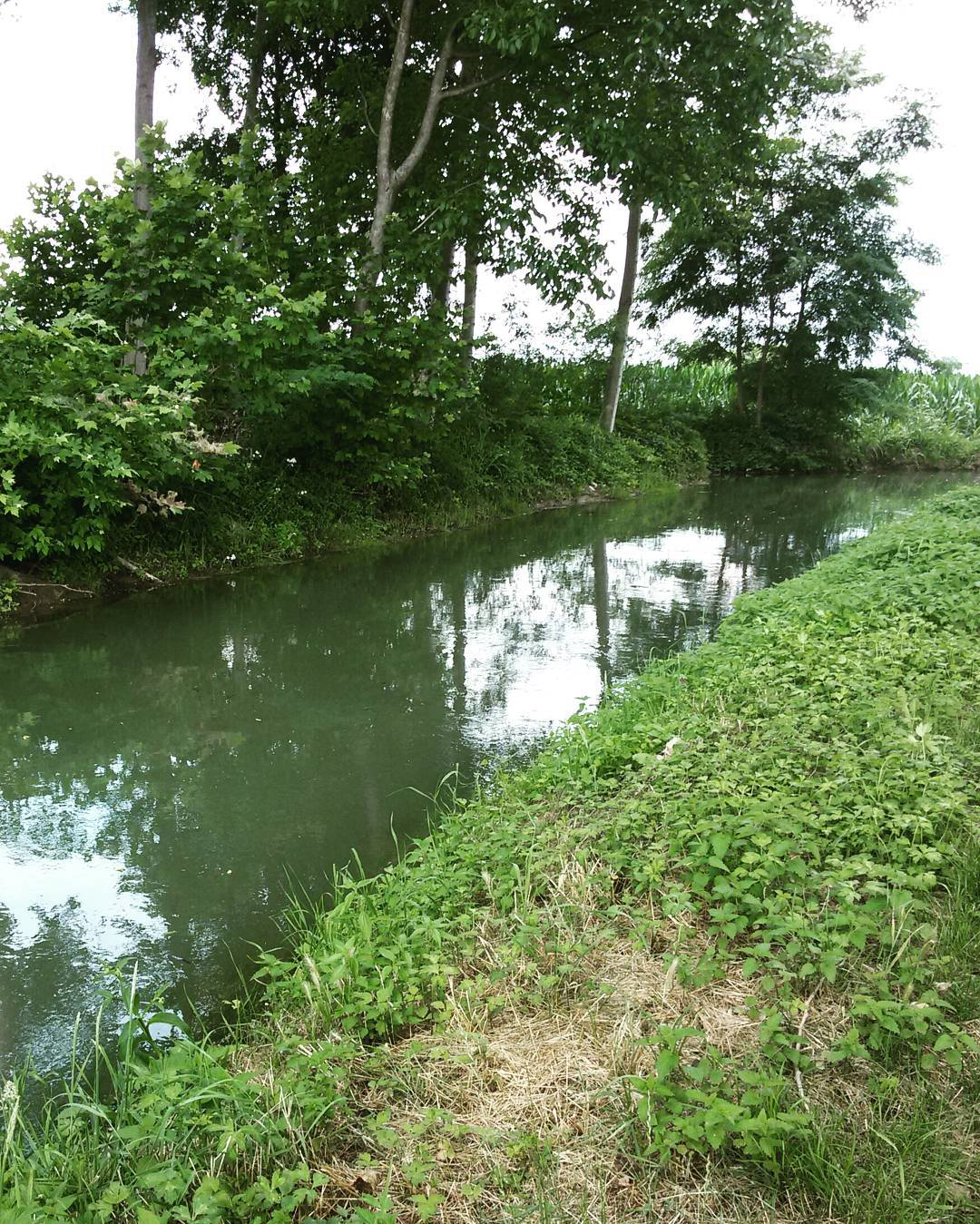
Creek in Corte de' Frati

The local economy is mostly based on agriculture and industrial activities. The territory is well known for its dairy farms and for its metal industry. Food is related to the city of Cremona, including salted meat, Grana Padano and different types of local fruits and vegetables coming from the local farms.

== Transport ==
Corte de' Frati is linked both to the city of Cremona and to the city of Brescia, thanks to the bus service offered in the area.

== Government ==
| Period | Mayor | Party |
|---|---|---|
| 1985–1990 | Italo Feraboli | Partito Socialista Italiano |
| 1990–1995 | Franco Guindani | Partito Socialista Italiano |
| 1995 | Giuseppe Rossetti | centro |
| 1995–2005 | Giuseppe Rossetti | centro |
| 2005–2015 | Rosolino Azzali | lista civica |
| 2015–2020 | Rosolino Azzali | lista civica |
| 2020–present day | Giuseppe Rossetti | lista civica |

== Notes ==
1. Bresciani and Cremonesi are two demonyms identifying people living in the province of Brescia or Cremona.

== Bibliography ==
- Bonometti, Dante (1978). Storia di Corte de' Frati. Biblioteca Comunale di Corte de' Frati.
