= Pontevico =

Pontevico Puntìch
- Comune
- Comune di Pontevico
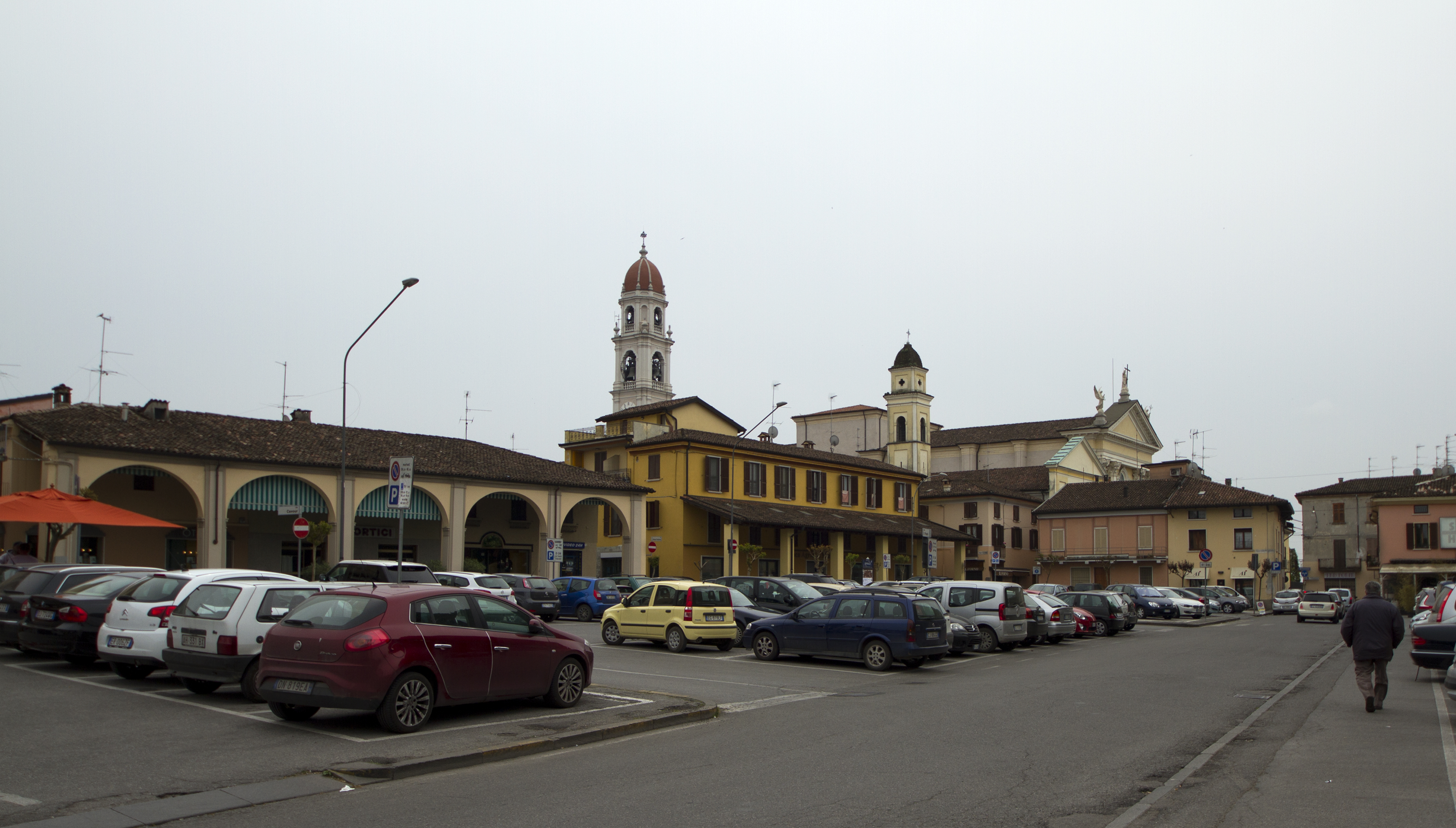

- Location within Italy Location within Lombardy
- Coordinates: 45°16′20″N 10°5′30″E
- Country: Italy
- Region: Lombardy
- Province: Brescia (BS)
- Frazioni: Bettegno, Campazzo, Chiesuola, Gauzza, Torchiera

Area
  - Total: 29 km^{2} (11 sq mi)
- Elevation: 55 m (180 ft)

Population (2021)
  - Total: 6,931
  - Density: 240/km^{2} (620/sq mi)
- Demonym: Pontevichesi
- Time zone: UTC+1 (CET)
  - Summer (DST): UTC+2 (CEST)
- Postal code: 25026
- Dialing code: 030
- ISTAT code: 017149
- Patron saint: San Pancrazio
- Saint day: 12 May
- Website: Official website

Pontevico (Brescian: Puntìch) is a comune in the province of Brescia in Lombardy, Italy. It is on the left bank of the river Oglio. As of 2021, Pontevico had a population of 7,038.

== Toponymy ==
The name Pontevico derives from the Latin Pontis Vicus, which means "town of the bridge", because the bridge had a great strategic importance: crossed by the Via Brixiana and built on the Oglio river, it connects the province of Brescia to the province of Cremona.

== History ==
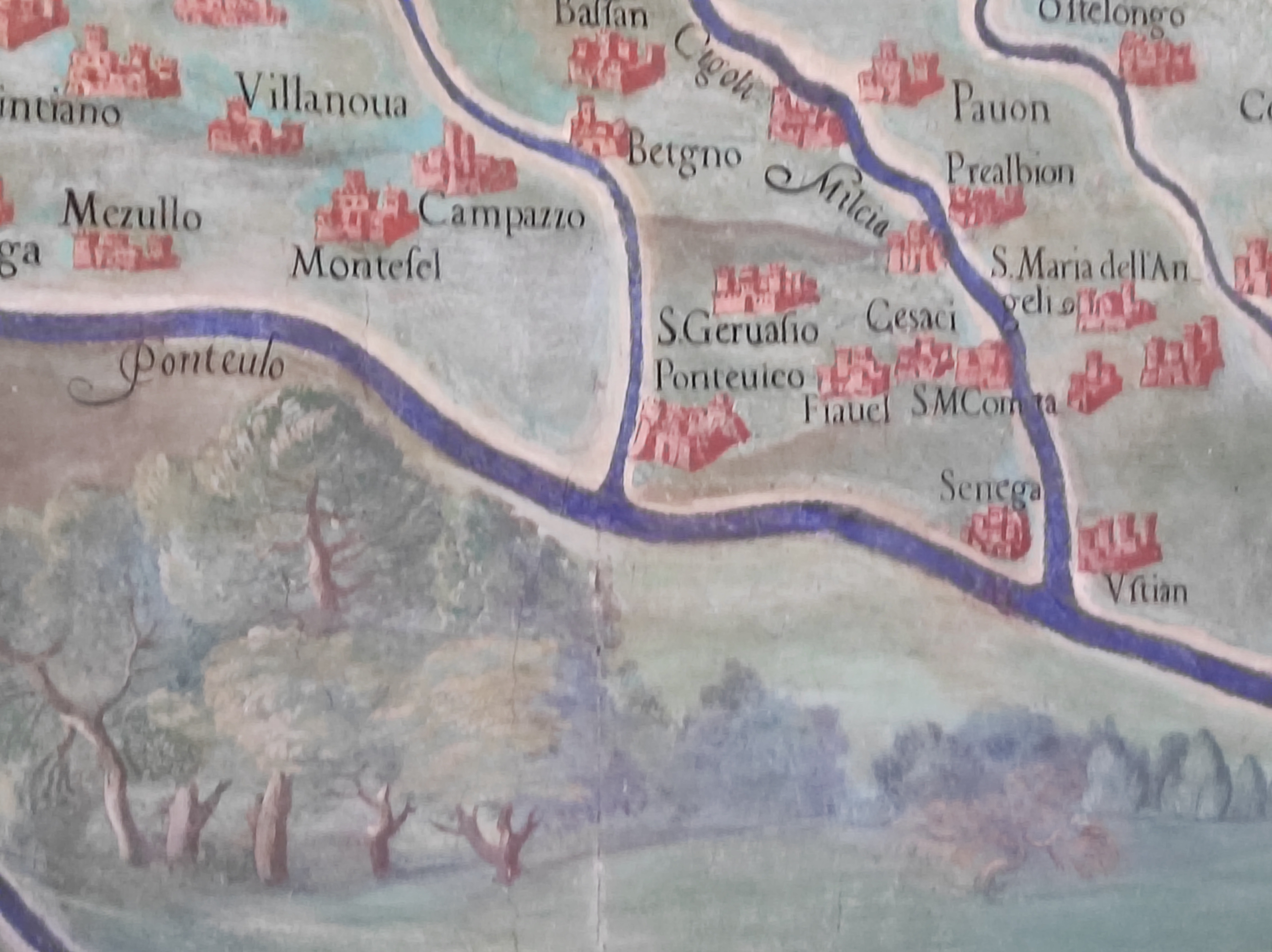
Pontevico depicted in the Gallery of Maps, made between 1581 and 1583 in the Vatican Museums.

Before the Roman-Gallic wars, Pontevico was inhabited by the Cisalpine Gauls. However, the town was probably founded under the Roman Empire: looking at the town from above, the centuriation of the original nucleus is clearly visible. Pontevico was crossed by the Via Brixiana, a Roman consular road which connected Cremona (lat. Cremona) to Brescia (lat. Brixia), from which Roman roads passed and then branched out towards the entire Cisalpine Gaul.

In the 6th century the navigation had a high importance, so Theodoric imposed a removal of the fishing equipment along the river to not impede the passage of boats. Due to the Magyars invasions, between the 9th and 10th century a castle in the town was built, called munitissimum castrum due to its great size.

Until the 13th century, the town was divided into the New and the Old ones, which had its own church and its own castle. The first hospices for pilgrims and the sick were opened during this period. The Hospitale, which has been continually present since 1170, gives the name to its street.

During the High Middle Ages, Pontevico immediately sided with Guelphs and its castle became the theater of battles between the two factions. In 1237, on the eve of the Battle of Cortenuova, the Guelph army was camped in the local fortress but it made the mistake of leaving the castle, leaving uncovered the left bank of the Oglio river. So, Federico II could pass the river and entered the castle, starting his march to Cortenuova.

Until the Wars in Lombardy, Pontevico was a part of the Duchy of Milan, when in 1426 it was conquered by the Republic of Venice. In the last phase of the wars, in 1452 Francesco Sforza regained the town after a two days-siege, but the next year Jacopo Piccinino brought back Pontevico under the Serenissima. The decisive clash was between 16 and 19 October 1453: the Duke of Milan's army conjoined with the Renè of Anjou's, King of Naples, one for a total of 20,000 infantrymen and 3,500 knights; after three days of siege, Pontevico fell under the Milanese army. Then, the town was razed to the ground and especially the French soldiers were very heavy with the population. However, the town after the Treaty of Lodi was brought back under the Republic of Venice which rebuilt Pontevico and its castle.

Under the Venetian rule Pontevico was a very important port and stronghold for the Serenissima which granted privileges to the town which were named Curia, Castello and Borgo. In the local port there was a trading station where colonial products were sold and fodder, linen, iron and wood was imported.

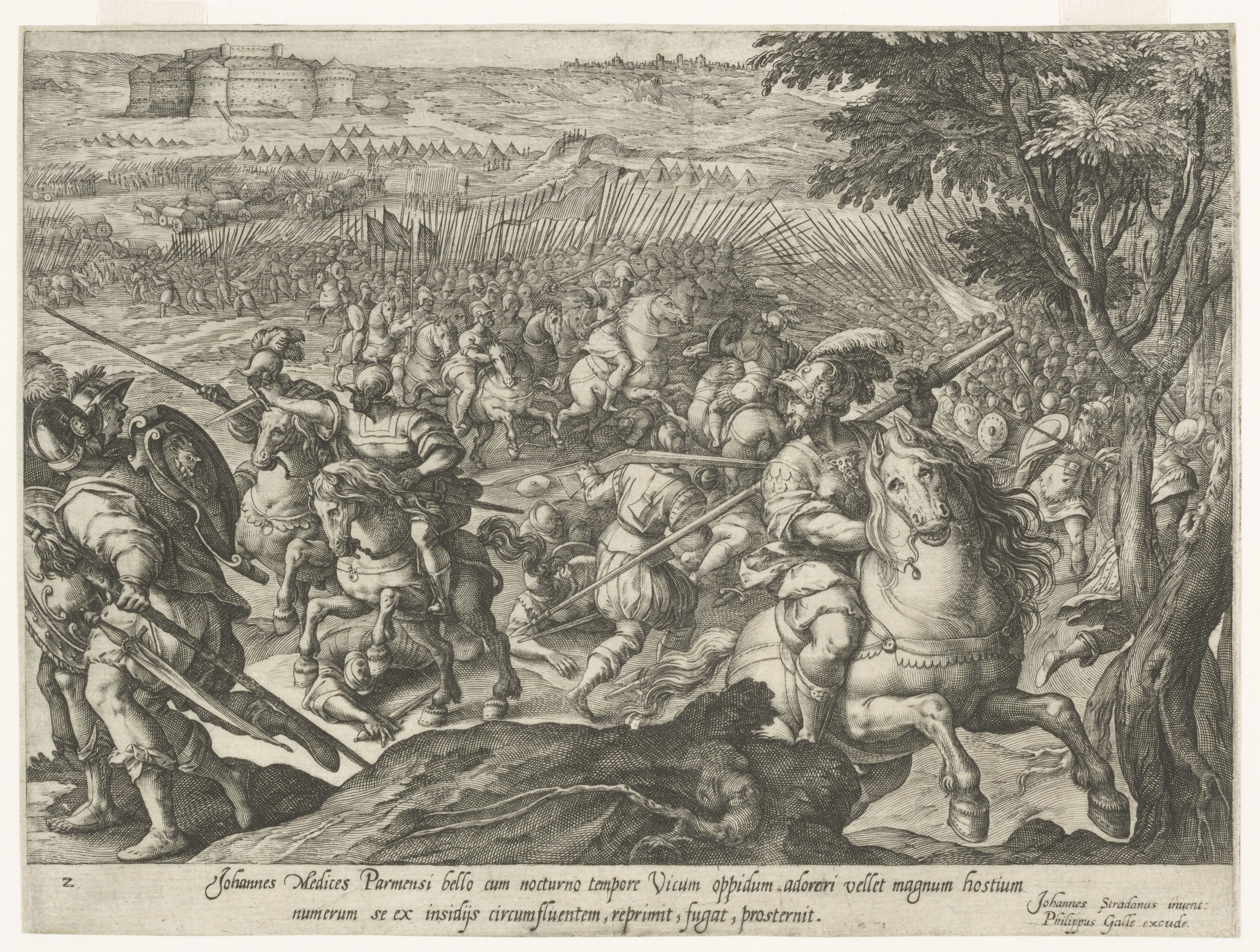
Giovanni dalle Bande Nere combats near Pontevico, 16th century.

Due to the big importance which Venetians gave to Pontevico, its inhabitants especially during the War of the League of Cambrai proved to be very loyal to the Republic, to the point of organizing a revolt against the French where Serenissima was alone against France, Spain and the Holy Roman Empire, in 1510. During that war, in April 1509 Venice, alone against Papal States, Kingdom of France, Holy Roman Empire and Spanish Empire, decided to reunite an army of about 50,000 soldiers right in Pontevico, whose Castle hosted the leaders of Venetian Army - Niccolò Orsini, Andrea Gritti and Bartolomeo di Alviano.

During this period, in Pontevico the weekly market was established (1559) and an abbey church was built (1584). In 1630, due to the plague of 1629, the local noble Francesco Capparino founded the Pio Luogo Poveri.

With the fall of the Republic of Venice (1797) and the disappearance of the fluvial market, caused by the appearance of the rail transport, the town during the 19th century experienced a phase of decline and the agriculture became the main activity. Due to this transformation, the poverty and the pellagra were very widespread. To solve this problem, during this period on the territory were founded lots of charitable organizations, the biggest one was the Istituto per Frenasteriche ed Epilettiche (1901), founded by Bassano Cremonesini and placed in the castle and still operating.

The town industrialization was so low and the first important industrial center was opened in 1908: it was called Società Filatura di Lino e Canape. But the mass industrialization only occurred during the Italian economic miracle. However the first factory got closed in 1956, in the 1960s its area became an artisan settlement.

Then, between the 1960s and the 1970s, the town expansion began (which still continues) when modern neighborhoods and numerous public works were created: the municipal library (1970), the methane network, the new nursery school (1977) and the new primary one (1983), the new and bigger aqueduct, later placed side by side to the wastewater purifier (1986) and the sports center with palasport (1980). During this years, the castle, which was destroyed in 1844 and transformed into a tenement, was profoundly restored and brought back to his medieval form. But are also dated back to that period the closure of the Ospedale Civile Gorno Ruffoni, an important hospital located in the Frazione of Chiesuola, in 1977 and the crash of the bridge on the Oglio river, which fell in the same year and was rebuilt in 1978.

== Main sights ==
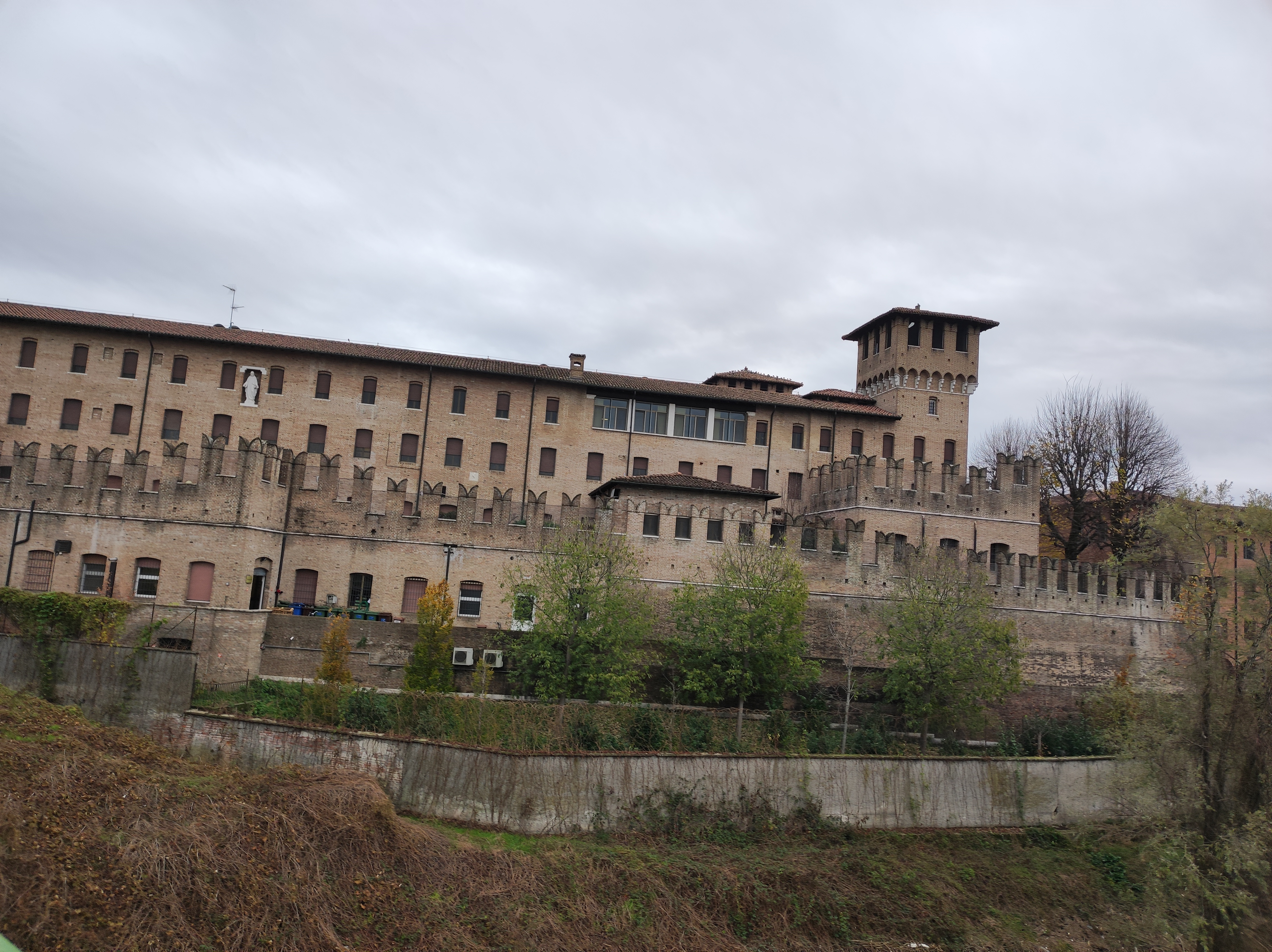
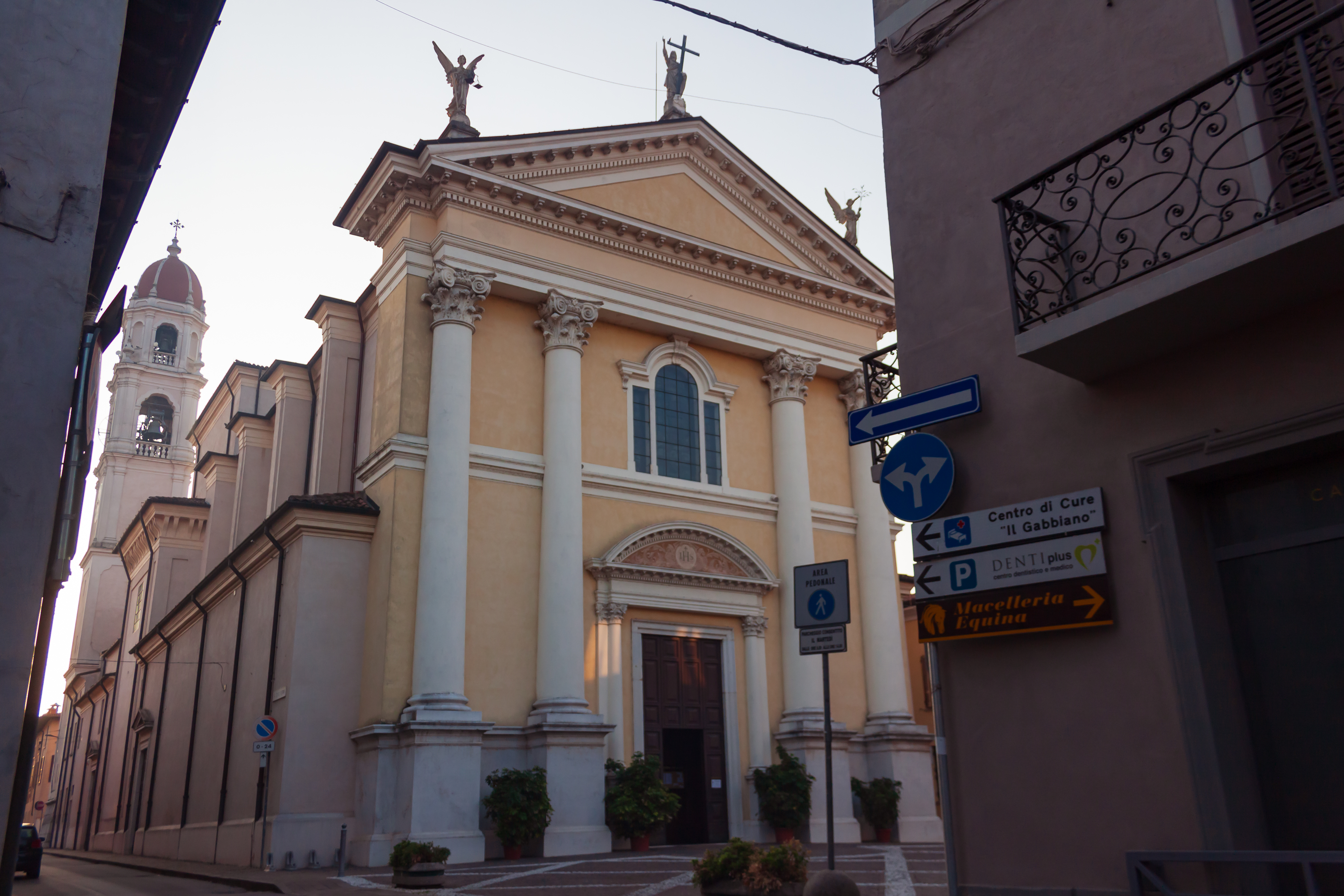
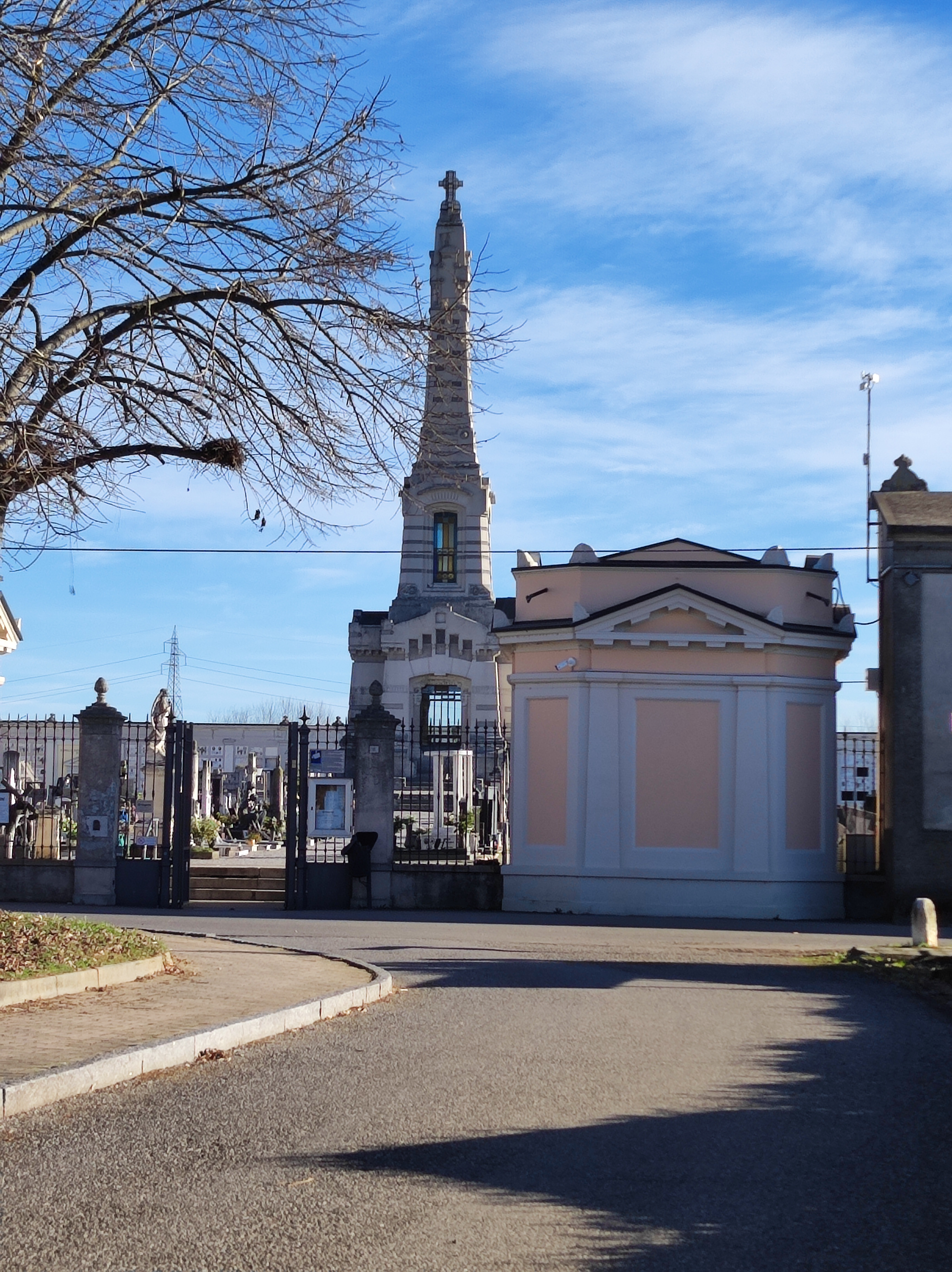
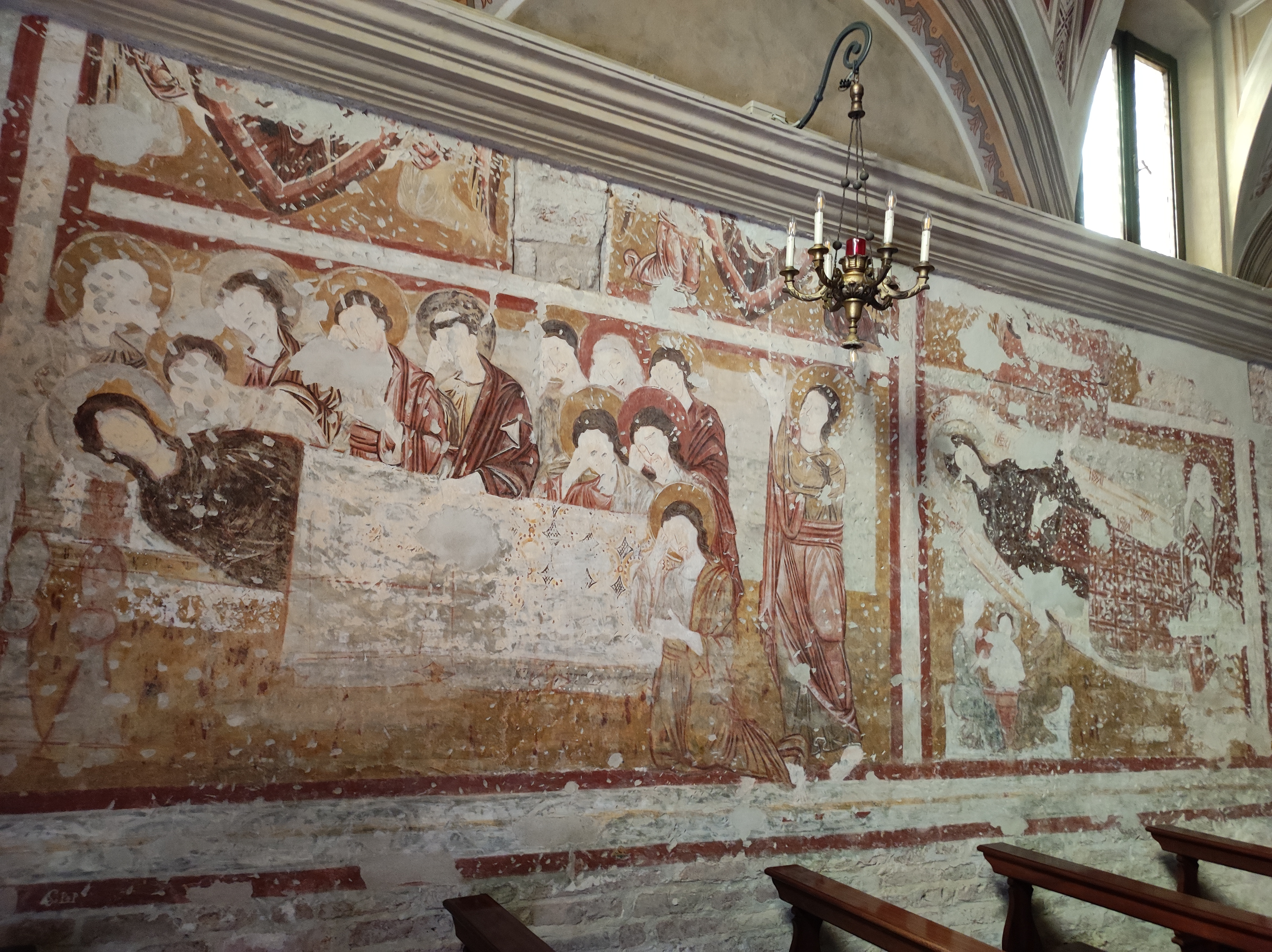
From left to right: the Castle of Pontevico, Tommaso e Andrea Apostoli church with its bell tower, Monumental cemetery with its obelisk and romanesque frescos made during the 13th century in Santa Maria in Ripa d'Oglio church.
- Castle of Pontevico: a romanesque-styled early Middle Ages castle built during the 9th century and remodeled several times over the centuries due to the continuous sieges suffered over the time. Since 1901, it's a neuropsychiatric institute.
- Tommaso e Andrea Apostoli: an Abbey church built during the 16th century and restored and expanded several times until the 1960. Its bell tower is the highest building in Pontevico due to its 52 meters-weight.
- Monumental cemetery: the local cemetery, in which there's a tall obelisk used as an ossuary hosting under its foundations a crypt.
- Santa Maria in Ripa d'Oglio: the oldest church and still standing building in Pontevico, built when Pontevico, at that time still called Pontis Vicus, was under Roman rule. Under the buildings there's an early christian baptistery made during the 5th century.
- Hospitale: an hospital built in 1170 near the defensive wall of the town, still operating as a nursing home called Hospice. The street in front of its main access is still called via Ospitale.
- Maglio Museum: a museum located in a watermill, one of the eleven that the town had in 1255, where there's a trip hammer made in 1883, the last operating in the town and closed during the 1960s.

=== Natural sights ===
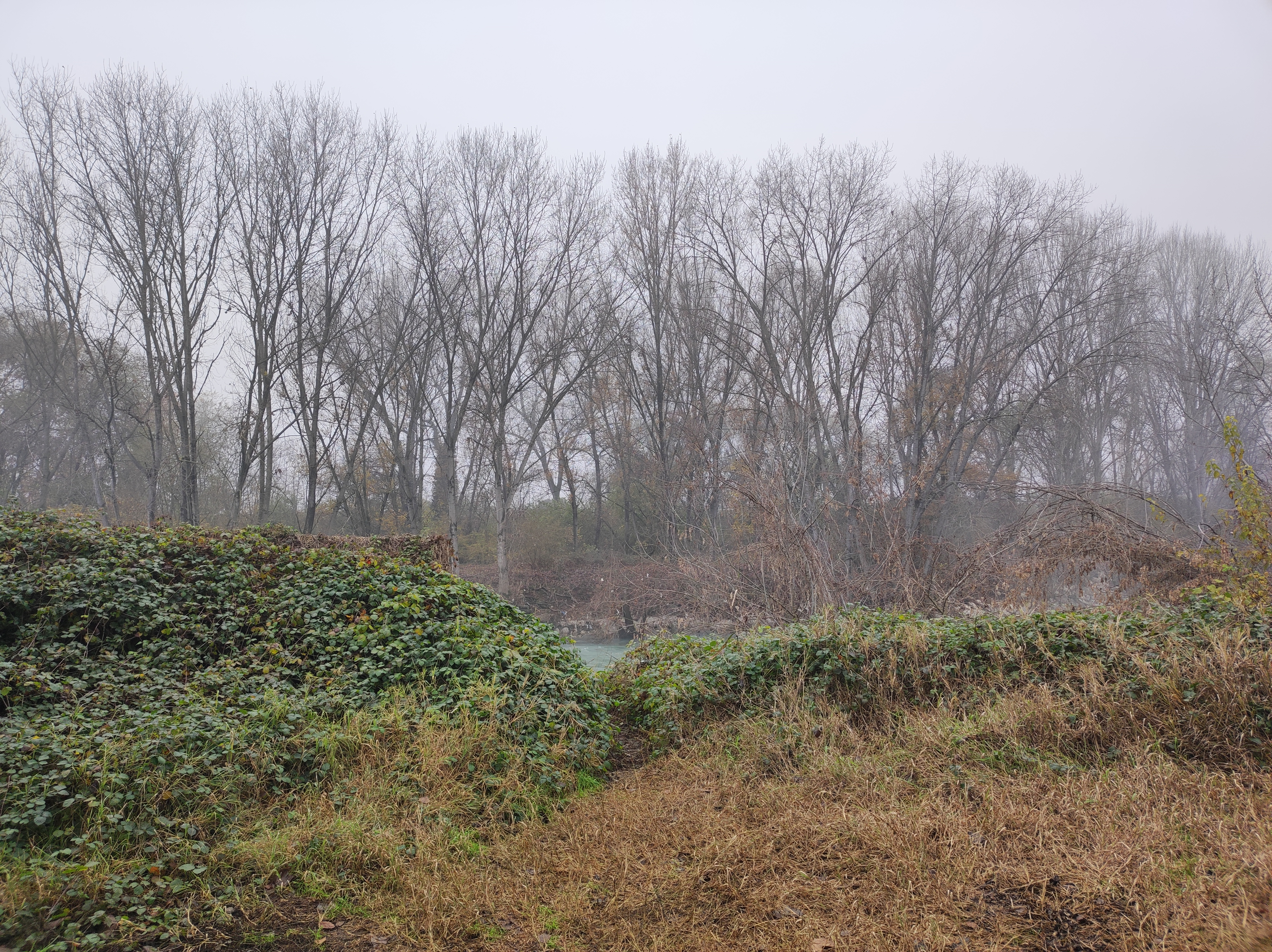
The Oglio river near Pontevico.
- Northern Oglio Regional Natural Park
- Strone Natural Park

== Notable people ==
- Giovanni Ducco (circa 1425-1496): former Bishop of Coron between 1479 and 1496
- Bernardino Gadolo (1463-1499): former literary man who worked with many humanists of the time such as Bernardo Bembo, Poliziano and Giovanni Pico della Mirandola. He was a Camaldolese prior in San Michele in Isola, Venice, between 1487 and 1491.
- Ferdinand Bruhin (1908-1986): former swiss midfielder who played for Olympique de Marseille between 1933 and 1942
- Angelo Bagnasco (1943): Cardinal of the Catholic church, former Arcibishop of Genoa between 2006 and 2020, President of the Italian Episcopal Conference between 2007 and 2017 and President of the Council of the Bishops' Conferences of Europe between 2016 and 2021.
- Domenico Rinaldi (1959): a former italian diver for SS Lazio Nuoto who competed at the 1984 and 1988 Summer Olympic Games and won a Bronze medal in the 1985 European Aquatics Championships.

== Transportation ==
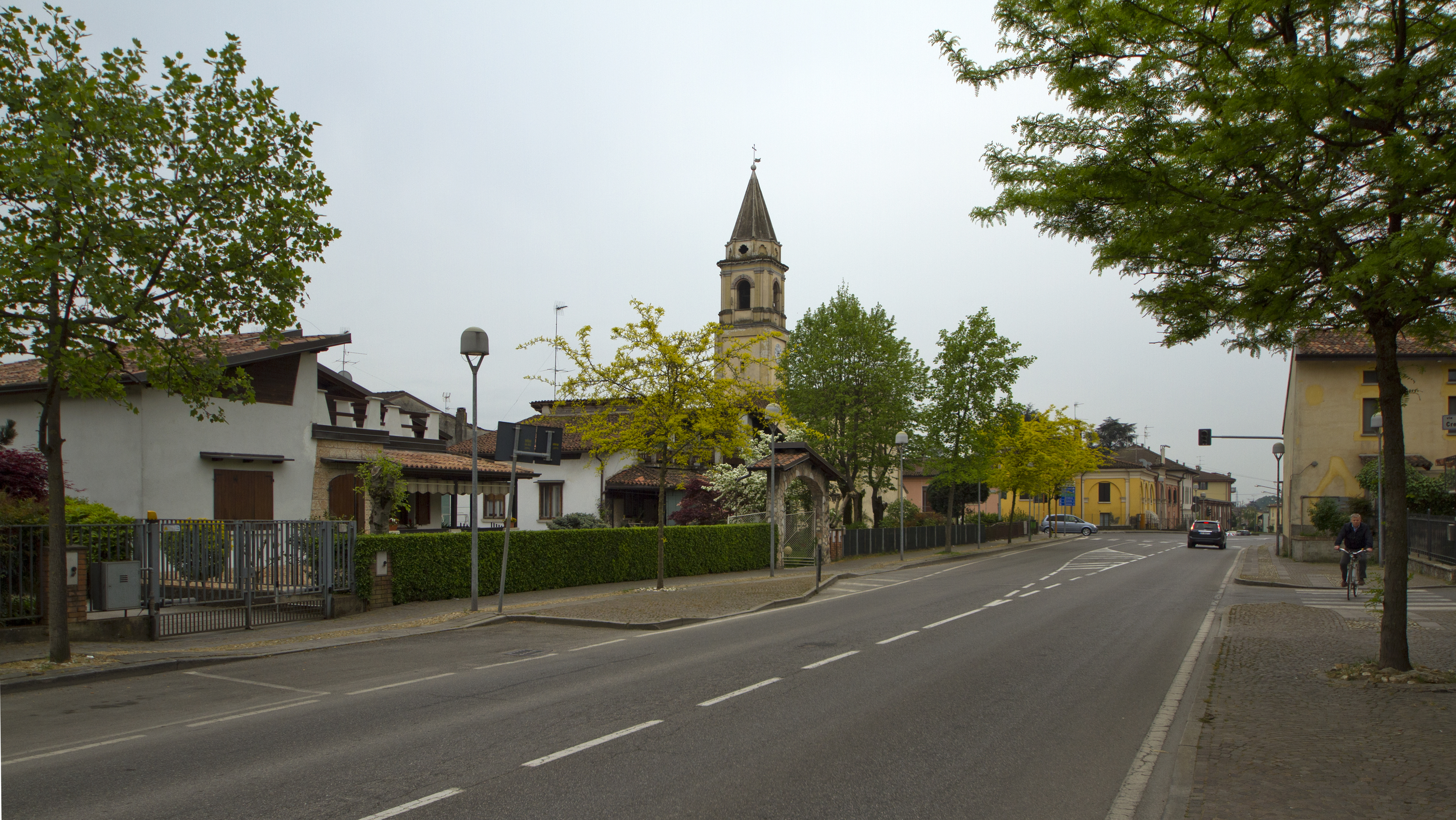
A view of Via Brescia in Pontevico, a part of Strada Statale 65bis Gardesana Occidentale built where under the Roman rule Via Brixiana crossed the town.

Pontevico is crossed from south to north by the Strada Statale 65bis Gardesana Occidentale and from east to west by a provincial road.

The town is served together with Robecco d'Oglio by a motorway tollbooth, located near the Pontevico's Frazione of Chiesuola long the Torino-Brescia highway, and by Robecco-Pontevico railway station, located near Robecco on the Brescia–Cremona line.
