= Santi Cosma e Damiano, Persico =

Church in Persico Dosimo, Italy

Santi Cosma e Damiano is a Roman Catholic church, located onv Via Persichello in the district of Persico in the comune of Persico Dosimo in the province of Cremona, region of Lombardy, Italy.

== History ==
This church was erected from the 17th to 18th centuries. The prior church was destroyed by an earthquake in 1694. The slender and tall bell-tower was erected in 1904 by the architect Adelchi Barbieri. In 2014, the church was closed due to damage to the roof.
