= Via Brixiana =

Roman road in Italy

Brixian Way
- Via Brixiana
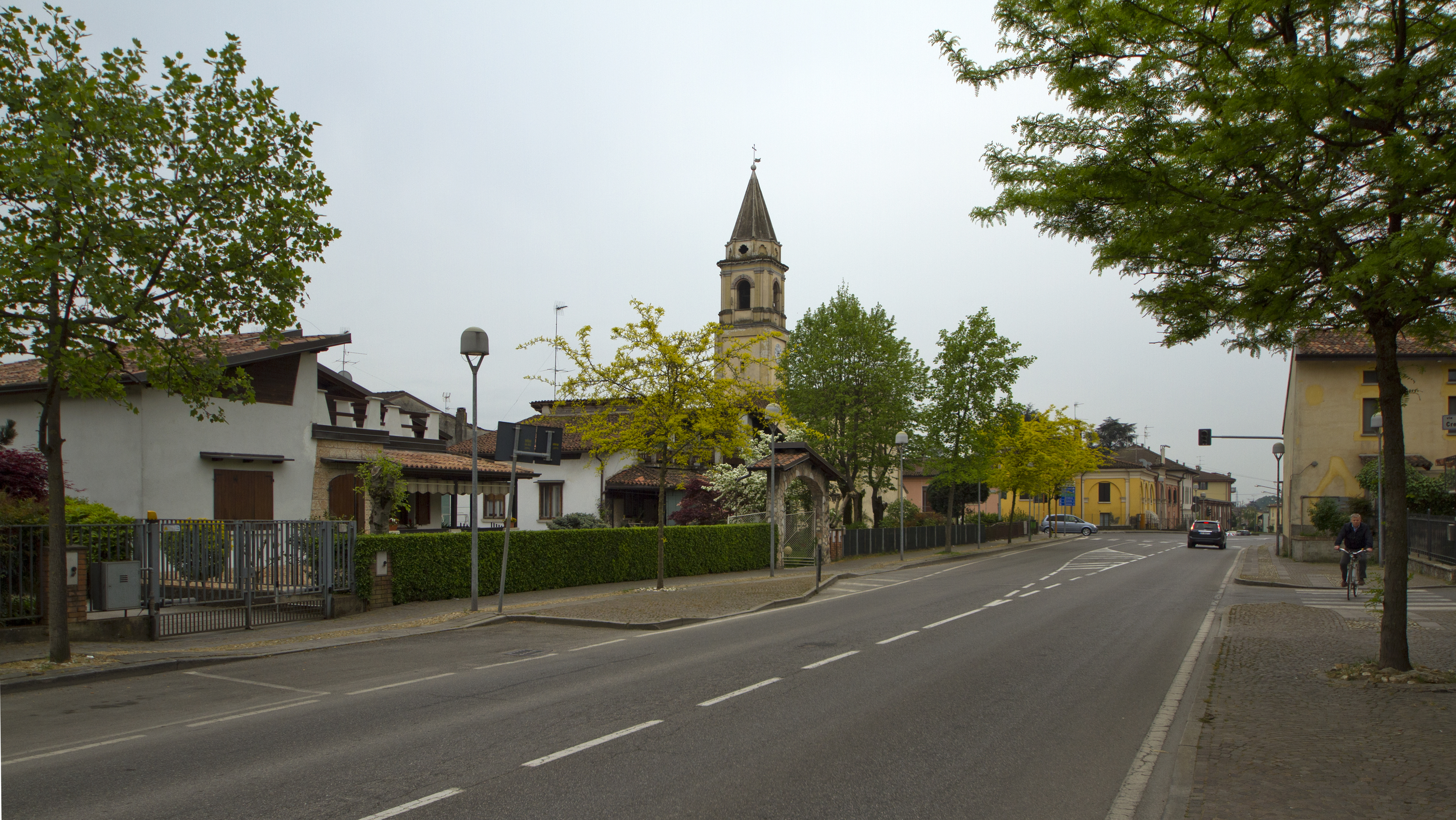
- Glimpse of via Brescia in Pontevico (Brescia), which follows the route of the ancient via Brixiana.
- Type: Roman road
- Location: Eastern Lombardy, Brescia to Cremona

Site notes
- Condition: No longer exists
- Owner: Roman Empire; Western Roman Empire

The Via Brixiana, or Via Cremonensis, was a Roman road created during the Roman-Gallic wars in the Roman province of Cisalpine Gaul. It connected Cremona to Brescia, from which Roman roads passed and then branched out towards the entire Northern Italy.

== Route ==
The Via Brixiana started in Cremona, an important inland port long the Po and ended in Brixia (Brescia), traversed by Via Gallica, connecting the city to the other roman consular roads. Due to Cremona fedelissima et nobilissima colonia de Romani (1585), the road, left Cremona (Cremona), intersecting Via Postumia, Via Regina, and traversed the Bassa Cremonese, continuing through Plaxanum (Pozzaglio ed Uniti), Brazzuoli, a Plaxanum's frazione, and Rubeccum (Robecco d'Oglio). Then, the road traversed the Ollius (Oglio) in Pontis Vicus (Pontevico) by a bridge who gave the name to the town, traversing Bassa Bresciana through Bassianum (Bassano Bresciano), Minervium (Manerbio), Balneolum (Bagnolo Mella) and Brixia (Brescia).
