= San Lorenzo, Pazzaglio ed Uniti =

Church in Pozzaglio ed Uniti, Italy

Coordinates: 45°12′07″N 10°02′48″E

San Lorenzo Martire is a Roman Catholic parish church located in the town of Pozzaglio ed Uniti in the province of Cremona, region of Lombardy, Italy.

== History ==
A church was originally built prior to the 14th century, by a Confraternity of the Order of the Umiliati, subsidiary to the Monastery of San Giacomo in Braida in Cremona.

After the suppression of the Umiliati order in 1570, the church was assigned to the Barnabite order of Benedictines, linked again the San Giacomo in Cremona. In 1587, construction of a new church began using materials from the old pieve, and the church was reconsecrated in 1592 again to St Lawrence.
