= San Giovanni Battista Decollato, Dosimo =

Church in Dosimo, Italy

Coordinates: 45.184491°N 10.104517°E

San Giovanni Battista Decollato is a Roman Catholic church, located in the neighborhood of Dosimo in the comune of Persico Dosimo in the province of Cremona, region of Lombardy, Italy.

== History ==
This church was rebuilt in 1756 in an eclectic Rococo and Neoclassical-style, with a single nave. In 1773, the belltower was erected, though restored in 1838 by the architect Luigi Voghera. In 1896, the church was widened to accommodate three naves. The interior putatively houses the relics of Santa Colomba.
