= Ferdinand Bruhin =

Swiss footballer (1908–1986)

Personal information
- Date of birth: 19 July 1908
- Place of birth: Pontevico, Italy
- Date of death: 7 May 1986 (aged 77)
- Place of death: Marseille, France
- Position: Midfielder

Senior career*
Years	Team	Apps	(Gls)
1932–1933	Cremonese		
1933–1942	Marseille	96	(4)
1942–1943	Lyon OU		
- * Club domestic league appearances and goals

Ferdinand Bruhin (19 July 1908 – 7 May 1986) was a Swiss footballer who spent most of his career with Olympique de Marseille
