= Visconti Castle (Pagazzano) =

Castle in northern Italy

- Castello Visconteo di Pagazzano
- Pagazzano, Lombardy, Northern Italy
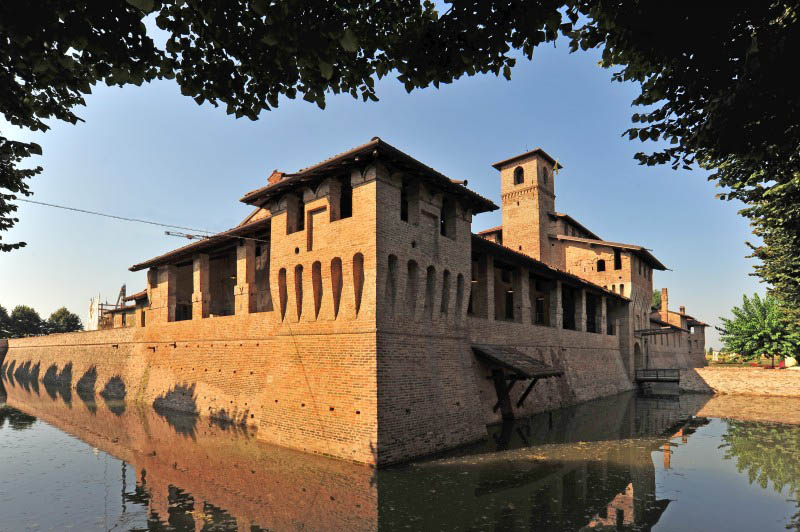
- The castle seen from the northeast corner

Site information
- Type: Medieval castle
- Owner: Pagazzano municipality
- Open to the public: Yes
- Condition: Good

Location
- Location within Northern Italy
- Coordinates: 45°31′53″N 9°40′12″E

Site history
- Built: 12th-15th centuries
- Built by: Visconti, Visconti di Brignano
- Materials: Bricks

The Visconti Castle of Pagazzano (Castello Visconteo di Pagazzano) is a moated, late-medieval castle located in Pagazzano, a town in the Province of Bergamo in the Italian region of Lombardy. The castle in the current form was probably erected between 1450 and 1475, at the initiative of the Visconti di Brignano transforming the previous 14th-century quadrangular fortification with a surrounding moat.

== History ==
A document from 1186 already mentions the existence of a fortress on the site. In the 14th century, the castle came to Bernabò Visconti, lord of Milan, and then to Gian Galeazzo Visconti, who donated it to his wife, Caterina Visconti. In 1357 and 1358, Petrarch resided for some time in the castle. In 1364, he interceded with Bernabò to preserve and improve the building.

In 1442 Filippo Maria Visconti donated the castle to the noble De-Isacchi family from Treviso. Shortly after, it passed to the Visconti di Brignano, who gave it the present form. The castle then had several owners: the Visconti-Aimi di Brignano, who resided in the nearby Palazzo Visconti di Brignano Gera d’Adda, the Marquises Bigli, and finally, the Marquises Crivelli.

The Pagazzano territory was disputed over the centuries by surrounding ruling forces, and various Visconti descendants. In the 19th century, the castle was owned by the Crivelli family.

In 2000, the castle was sold to the Comune di Pagazzano.

== Sources ==
- Beltrami, Luca (1907). "Il Castello di Pagazzano del Marchese Crivelli". Ville e Castelli d’Italia. Lombardia e laghi (in Italian). Milan: Edizioni della Tecnografica. pp. 223–224.
- Conti, Flavio; Hybsch, Vincenzo; Vincenti, Antonello (1993). I castelli della Lombardia. Provincie di Bergamo e Brescia (in Italian). Novara: Istituto Geografico de Agostini. ISBN 88-415-0161-8.
- Wilkins, Ernest Hatch (1958). Petrarch's eight years in Milan. Cambridge, MA, US: Mediaeval Academy of America. hdl:2027/heb.31117. OCLC 926390871.
