= Battle of Ghedi =

1453 between Venice and Milan

- Part of the Wars in Lombardy and the Milanese War of Succession
Date	15 August 1453
Location	Ghedi, Lombardy
Result	Milanese victory

Belligerents
Duchy of Milan Margraviate of Mantua	Republic of Venice

Commanders and leaders
Francesco Sforza; Roberto Sanseverino d'Aragona; Tiberto Brandolini	Jacopo Piccinino; Paolo dalla Rossa †; Antonello da Palermo †

Casualties and losses
Unknown	High

The Battle of Ghedi was a battle during the long conflict between the Republic of Venice and the Duchy of Milan which lasted between the years 1425 and 1454 (the year in which the Peace of Lodi was signed).

This battle took place on 15 August 1453 near the Lombard town of Ghedi. The clash allowed the Duchy of Milan to recover a big part of Bassa Bresciana. The battle resulted in the deaths of many Venetians and, as a result of the defeat the Serenisima Republica removed Jacopo Piccinino from command of its armies. The Treaty of Lodi was signed the next year in April. In order to secure his lands and avoid further conflict with Milan Piccinino married Drusiana Sforza, the illegitimate daughter of the Milanese Duke Francesco Sforza in 1464.
