= Robecco d'Oglio =

- Comune
- Comune di Robecco d'Oglio
- Coat of arms

- Location within Italy Location within Lombardy
- Coordinates: 45°16′N 10°5′E
- Country: Italy
- Region: Lombardy
- Province: Cremona (CR)

Government
  - Mayor: Marco Romeo Pipperi

Area
  - Total: 18.1 km^{2} (7.0 sq mi)
- Elevation: 48 m (157 ft)

Population (2007)
  - Total: 2,285
  - Density: 126/km^{2} (327/sq mi)
- Time zone: UTC+1 (CET)
  - Summer (DST): UTC+2 (CEST)
- Postal code: 26010
- Dialing code: 0372

Robecco d'Oglio (Cremunés: Rubèch) is a comune (municipality) in the Province of Cremona in the Italian region Lombardy, located about 80 kilometres (50 mi) southeast of Milan and about 15 kilometres (9 mi) north of Cremona.

== History ==
During the Roman era, Robecco d'Oglio (lat. Rubeccum) was crossed by the Via Brixiana, a Roman consular road which connected Cremona (lat. Cremona) to Brescia (lat. Brixia), from which Roman roads passed and then branched out towards the entire Cisalpine Gaul.

== Transportation ==
Robecco is served together with Pontevico by a railway station (named Robecco-Pontevico) on the Brescia–Cremona line.
