= Jacopo Piccinino =

Italian condottiero and nobleman

Jacopo Piccinino (1423 – July 1465) was an Italian condottiero and nobleman, the son of military leader Niccolò Piccinino. A native of Perugia, he was the feudal lord of Sulmona, Sterpeto, Assisi, Chieti, Città Sant'Angelo, Francavilla al Mare, Varzi, Fiorenzuola d'Arda, Atessa, Fidenza, Pandino, Penne, Borgonovo Val Tidone, Castell'Arquato, Frugarolo, Borgo Val di Taro.

== Military career ==
After a period as lieutenant of his father in Bologna, he fought in the Battle of Anghiari (1440). In his early career he fought mainly against Francesco Sforza, in Lombardy and central Italy, eventually, after the death of his brother Francesco Piccinino, becoming the commander-in-chief of the Repubblica Ambrosiana (1449). After abandoning the Milanese to their fate, in 1450 he became a general of the Venetian Army.

Later, in 1463, after being under pressure by Alessandro Sforza in the Abruzzi, where he was supporting John II, Duke of Lorraine, in the course of one of the dynastic wars which tore apart the Kingdom of Naples in that period, he agreed to sign a treaty: Piccinino married to Drusiana, Francesco Sforza's natural daughter, and obtained the confirmation of his lands as well as the title of chancellor of the Kingdom of Naples.

== Death ==
In 1465 Piccinino was called to Naples to receive the position as viceroy of Abruzzi and serve as leader of King Ferdinand I of Naples's troops. Here, however, he was treacherously arrested by order of the king, and was murdered while imprisoned.
