= Funerary Monument to Sir John Hawkwood =

Fresco by Paolo Uccello

Coordinates: 43.773232°N 11.255992°E

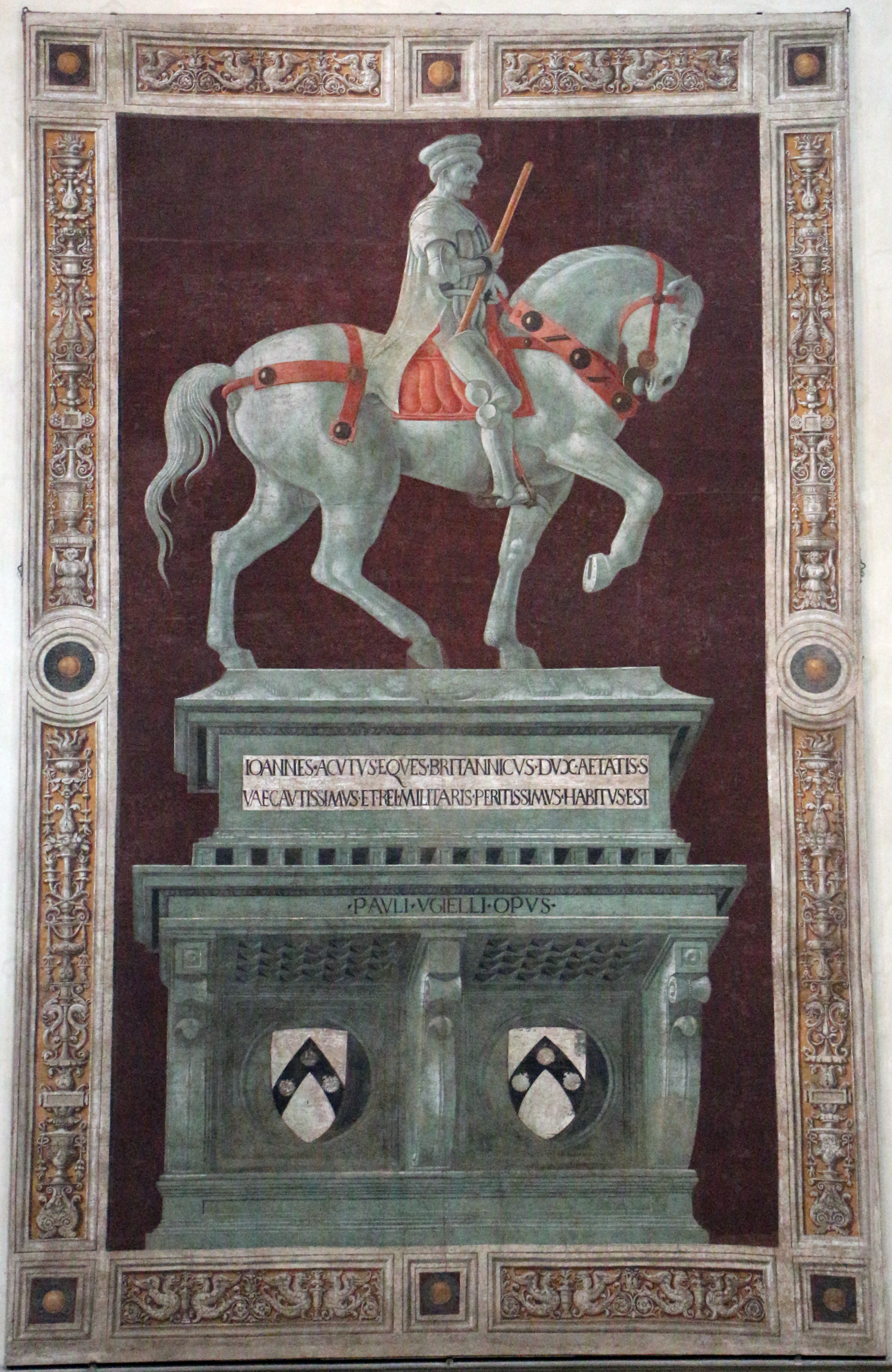
Funerary Monument to Sir John Hawkwood: the figure is larger than life-size, central panel (1436), measures 732 × 404 cm (288 × 159 in); with Trompe-l'œil grotto-esque frame added in 1524, 820 × 515 cm (323 × 203 in).

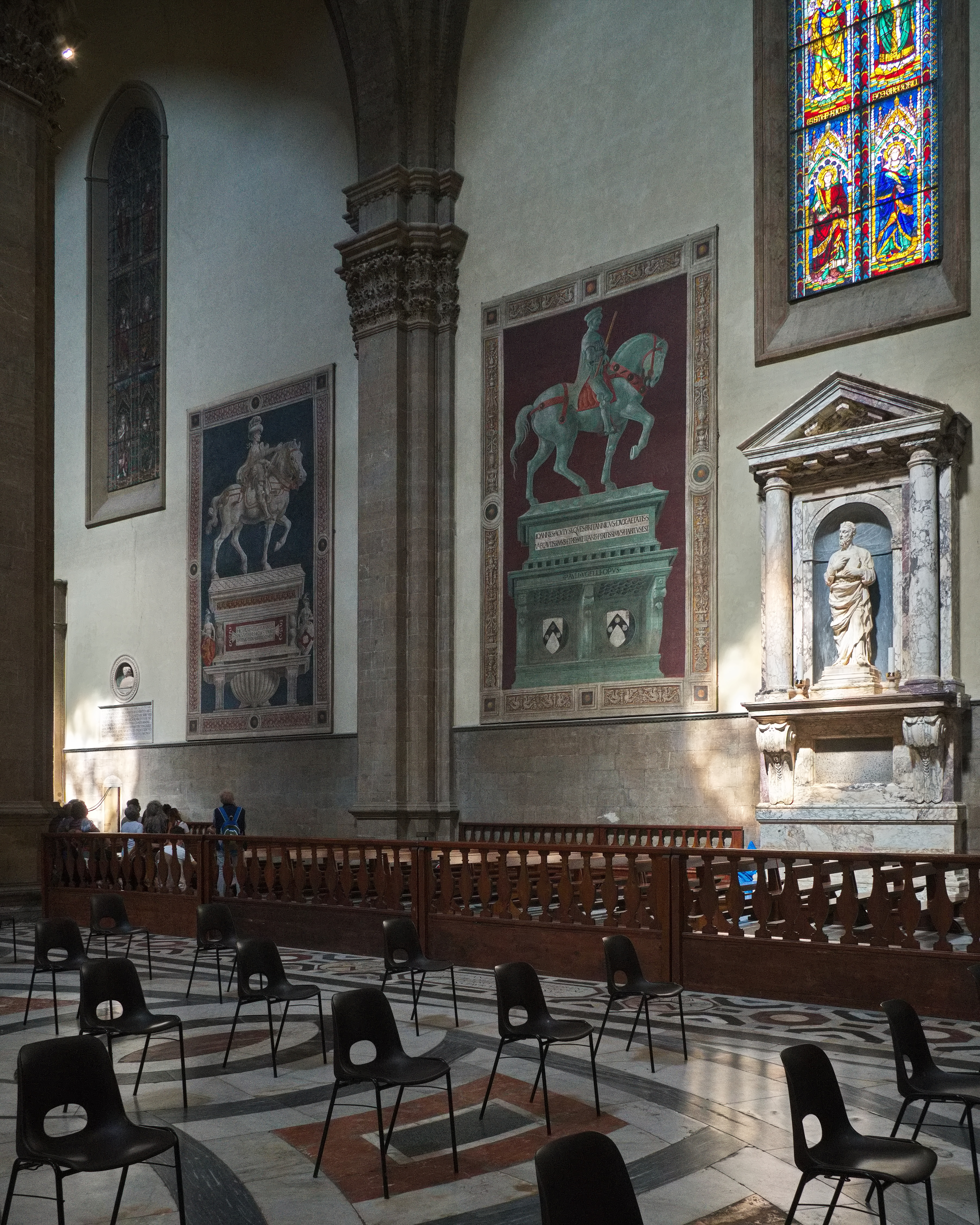
Fresco of Sir John Hawkwood (right) shown in situ in the Duomo, Florence, beside a similar depiction of fellow condottiero Niccolò da Tolentino (d.1435) by Andrea del Castagno

The Funerary Monument (or Equestrian Monument) to Sir John Hawkwood is a fresco by Paolo Uccello, commemorating English condottiero John Hawkwood, commissioned in 1436 for Florence Cathedral. The fresco is an important example of art commemorating a soldier-for-hire who fought in the Italian peninsula and is a seminal work in the development of perspective.

The politics of the commissioning and recommissioning of the fresco have been analyzed and debated by historians. The fresco is often cited as a form of "Florentine propaganda" for its appropriation of a foreign soldier of fortune as a Florentine hero and for its implied promise to other condottieri of the potential rewards of serving Florence. The fresco has also been interpreted as a product of internal political competition between the Albizzi and Medici factions in Renaissance Florence, due to the latter's modification of the work's symbolism and iconography during its recommissioning.

The fresco is the oldest extant and authenticated work of Uccello, from a relatively well-known aspect of his career compared to the periods before and after its creation. The fresco has been restored (once in 1524 by Lorenzo di Credi, who added the frame) and is now detached from the wall; it has been repositioned twice in modern times. It is now on the north wall of the nave, beside a similar depiction of fellow condottiero Niccolò da Tolentino (d.1435) by Andrea del Castagno.

== John Hawkwood ==
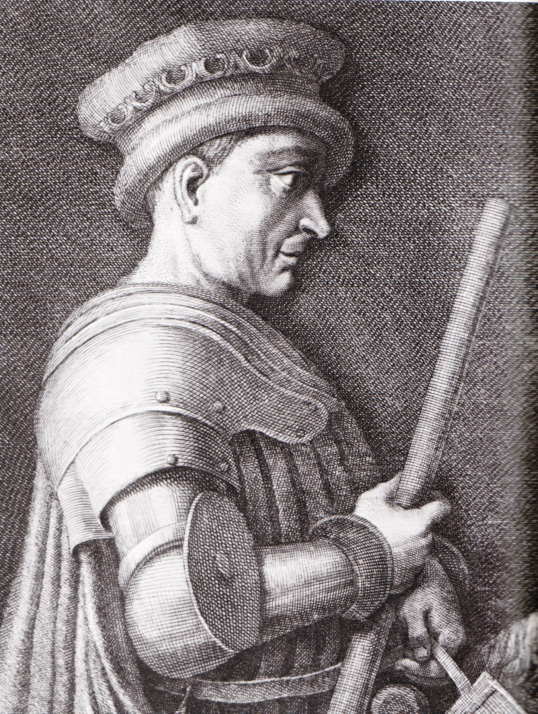
Engraving of John Hawkwood, based on the fresco

Hawkwood had a long military career and a complicated relationship with Florence. He fought for England during the Hundred Years War and then with the "Great Company" which had harassed the Avignon Papacy. After gaining command of the "White Company" from Albert Sterz in the 1360s, Hawkwood led the company across the Alps in 1363 in the employ of John II, Marquess of Montferrat, to take part in his war against Milan. Hawkwood and the "White Company" remained in Italy, accepting money from many city-states, both to wage war and to refrain from it. Hawkwood's reputation as one of the ablest condottieri in the peninsula developed in the ensuing decades, during which he was employed (by both sides) in the Pisan–Florentine War (1363–1364), notably winning the Battle of Cascina (1364) for Florence, in the wars of Perugia against the Pope (1369), and in the service of Bernabò Visconti in his war against a coalition that included Pisa and Florence, and even (in 1372) the Marquis of Monteferrato.

Hawkwood then entered the service of Pope Gregory XI in his wars against Milan (1372–1375) and in the War of the Eight Saints (1375–1378), during which Hawkwood helped put down the Florentine-instigated rebellions in the Papal States. During the conflict, Hawkwood was paid 130,000 florins—which was extracted from local clergy, bishops, abbots, monasteries, and ecclesiastical institutions—to confine his activities to suppressing the rebellions in the Papal States, rather than directly attacking Florence. Hawkwood also received a 600 florin annual salary for the next five years and a lifetime annual pension of 1,200 florins.

Hawkwood married Donnina, the illegitimate daughter of Bernabò Visconti, in 1377. In that same year he defected to Florence. Hawkwood's 1377 massacre at Cesena during the twilight of his papal employment in the War of the Eight Saints continues to tarnish his legacy. Thus, until 1377, Hawkwood had principally served the Visconti of Milan and their allies in Pisa, Lucca, and Siena, usually against the interests of Florence, making him an ironic candidate for a monument in the Duomo of Florence. At the bidding of Pisa, Hawkwood attacked the Brunelleschi family's Villa Petraia in Castello, burned Florentine subject territories around Incisa after defeating Florentine condottiero Ranuccio Farnese il Vecchio, and even taunted Florence from outside the city walls.

However, Hawkwood was the de facto commander-in-chief (Captain-General) of Florence's military from 1377 until immediately prior to his death in 1394. Hawkwood won many victories for Florence, including his suppression of the Ciompi revolt in January 1382, but contemporary Florentines would have regarded Hawkwood's successful retreat from Milan late in his career, across three rivers—including the notorious Oglio—and across a barren countryside, as his "greatest military feat".

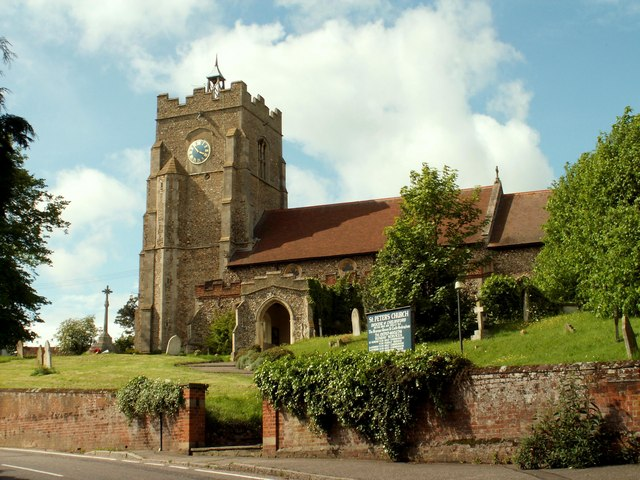
A tomb was prepared for Hawkwood in St. Peter's in Sible Hedingham, but it is unknown whether his body was repatriated.

Hawkwood, now in his seventies, made preparations to return to England, where he had been sending money to acquire land, and set up a chantry. Just as he was liquidating his affairs in Italy, he died, on March 17, 1394.

In 1395, Richard II of England petitioned Florence for the return of Hawkwood's body, as he had done for Robert de Vere, Duke of Ireland, the local magnate to the Hawkwood family in England, in whose service he had begun his military career. Florence acquiesced to Richard II's request in a June 3, 1395 letter:

Our devotion can deny nothing to the eminence of your highness. We will leave nothing undone that is possible to do, so that we may fulfill your good pleasure. So, therefore, although we consider it reflected glory on us and our people to keep the ashes and bones of the late brave and most magnificent captain John Hawkwood, who, as commander of our army, fought most gloriously for us and who at public expense was interred in the principal church of Santa Reparata ... nevertheless, according to the tenor of your request, we freely concede permission that his remains shall return to their native land.

However, it remains an open question whether Hawkwood's remains were ever transferred to England, to the tomb prepared for him at St. Peter's in Sible Hedingham, or whether his remains were reburied in 1405 under the old choir of the Duomo, of which record has been lost since it was repaved in the 16th century. In any case, the tomb monument would have run into difficulty, as a ban on tombs above floor level in the Cathedral was passed on April 5, 1400.

== Context ==
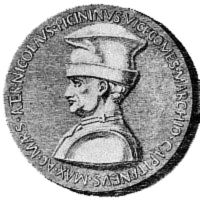
The commissioning of the fresco coincided with that of a monument to Niccolò Piccinino in Lucca, then at war with Florence.

In the Quattrocento, it was traditional for condottieri like Hawkwood to be buried in major public churches, even when their careers had produced mixed results for the city-state in question. The genre of the equestrian statue was revived during the Quattrocento for the purpose of commemorating condottieri; Donatello's Equestrian Statue of Gattamelata (c. 1447–1453) in Padua is the first surviving bronze equestrian statue since Ancient Rome ("probably with the Hawkwood in mind"). In Venice Tibertino Brandolino was interred at San Francesco; Jacopo de' Cavalli at Santi Giovanni e Paolo; Paolo Savelli at Basilica dei Frari, along with a wooden equestrian statue on a marble sarcophagus, which—along with the bronze horses on the façade of St. Mark—may have inspired Uccello's Hawkwood; and Konrad Aichelberg at a church in Pisa. When such burials were not possible, frescoes were an acceptable substitute: Guidoriccio da Fogliano was painted on horseback by Simone Martini in Palazzo Pubblico in Siena in 1328; Pietro Farnese was depicted in a papier-mâché equestrian monument atop a sarcophagus in the Florence Cathedral in 1363.

Holding ever more lavish funeral ceremonies for fallen condottieri was only one way in which Italian city-states competed with each other to attract the services of the most skilled mercenaries. Hawkwood's funeral was sandwiched between the funerals in Siena of Giovanni d'Azzo degli Ubaldini—who had been poisoned by the Florentines in the Visconti Wars—and Giovanni "Tedesco" da Pietramala. The commissioning of Uccello to repaint the fresco came at the "climax" of a war with Lucca, which had recently begun a monument to honor Niccolò Piccinino, in contrast to Piccinino's defaming portrait in the Palazzo della Signoria in 1428, depicting him hanging upside-down in chains, which was "depaint[ed]" in April 1430.

== Commissioning ==
=== Background ===
On August 20, 1393—when the Signoria, at the suggestion of Coluccio Salutati, voted to erect a marble statue of Hawkwood in the Duomo, "that brave men may know that the commune of Florence recompenses true service"—Hawkwood was liquidating his Tuscan properties and preparing to return to England. It was unprecedented for the Signoria to vote to erect a monument to a living person in the cathedral. The ambiguous plans of the Signoria—which likely was aware of Hawkwood's health status—might well have been for a tomb rather than a cenotaph; Hawkwood died soon after, on March 17, 1394. The Signoria went to great lengths (unsuccessfully) to entice Donnina to remain in the city—voting to transfer various sums of money to her (in exchange for Hawkwood's Tuscan fortress), despite "thorny legal issues" which required multiple acts of the city council—indicating to some extent the market value of Hawkwood's symbolic capital.

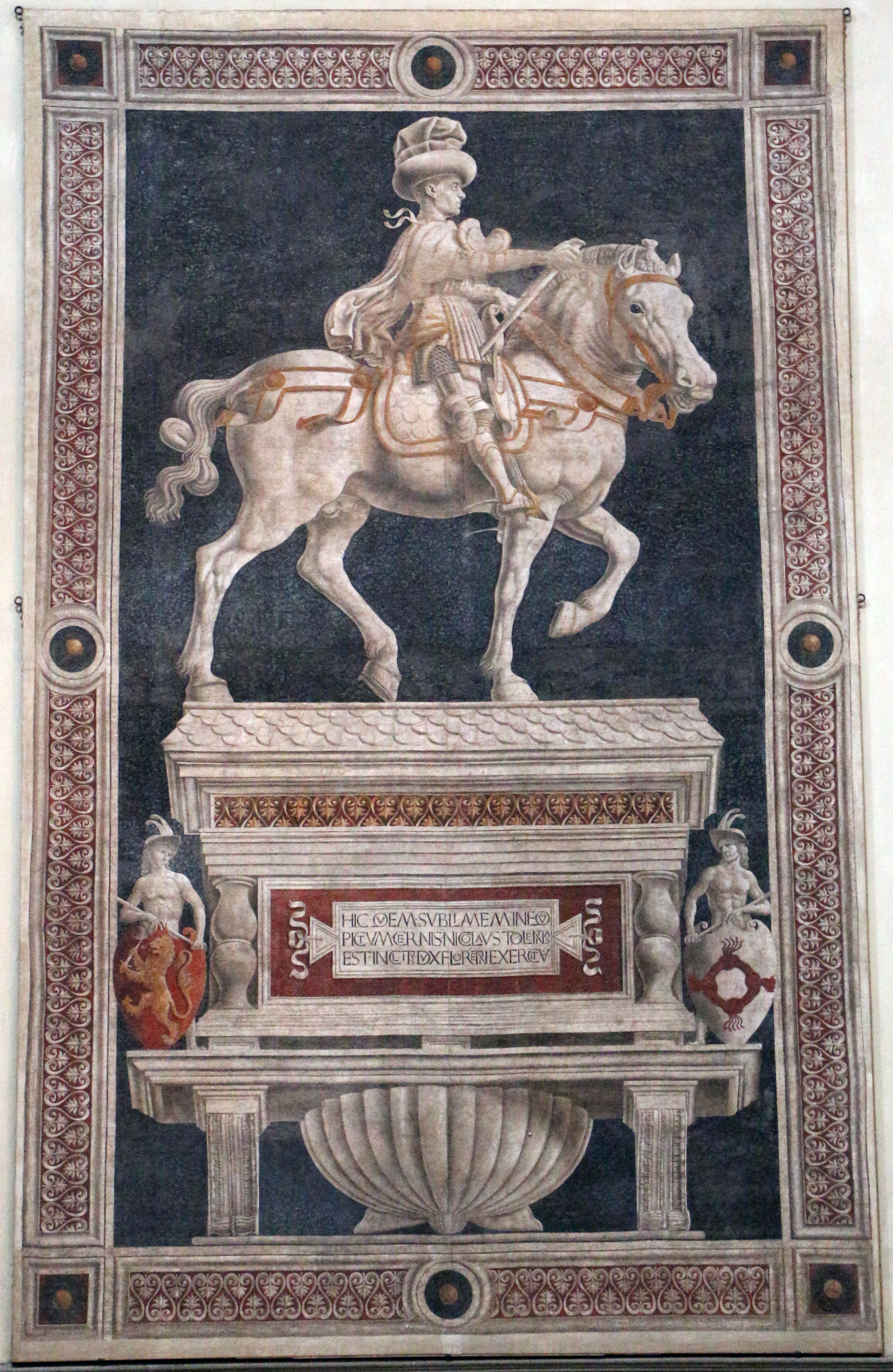
The fresco of fellow condottiero Niccolò da Tolentino is adjacent to the Hawkwood in the Florence Cathedral.

Hawkwood's March 20 funeral began in the Piazza della Signoria, continued to the Battistero di San Giovanni, where his body was placed on the baptismal font for public viewing, and culminated in the Cathedral, at a cost of 410 florins, not counting the substantial expenses of the Guilds.

The plans for Hawkwood's commemoration were modified on December 2, 1395, when it was decided to also rework the wooden monument of Pietro Farnese, the hero of the Pisan war, and to place marble tomb monuments to Farnese and Hawkwood on the north aisle, facing the high altar. Painters Agnolo Gaddi and Giuliano Arrighi were selected by a committee to sketch directly onto the Duomo wall models for the Hawkwood and Farnese tombs. Although neither tomb was realized, documentary evidence suggests that a painting of Hawkwood—with a figure of Hawkwood by Gaddi and a sarcophagus by Pesello—was completed by June 16, 1396. Historian Frances Stonor Saunders speculates that Uccello may have based his representation of Hawkwood on this early painting and that the earlier painting may have been based on a death mask of Hawkwood. The Hawkwood fresco is situated in the third bay of the northern wall, today flanked by paintings of Dante (c. 1455) and a similar fresco monument to fellow mercenary Niccolò da Tolentino (1456, by Andrea del Castagno); fictive tombs in fresco of two humanist ecclesiasts—Bishop Corsini (c. 1422, probably by Giovanni dal Ponte) and Fra Luigi de' Marsigli (c. 1439 by Bicci di Lorenzo), an Augustinian friar who founded a literary academy—are much smaller than those of the two condottieri. The fresco probably came to replace the tomb (rather than serving as a place marker for it), maybe for reasons of expedience and frugality, although there is little documentary evidence on this regard.

=== Fresco ===
The fresco was initially commissioned, decades after Hawkwood's death, in May 1433 by the Albizzi government, just months before the regime's collapse. Perhaps the project was an attempt by the Albizzi to hearken back to a time when the oligarchic elite of Florence had been more aligned with their own conservative interests. On July 13, 1433, design competition notices for the new monument were placed at the Duomo, the Baptistry, and Orsanmichele. The instigators of the renewed project were the grandsons of Guido di Soletto del Pera Baldovinetti, one of the ambassadors who (unsuccessfully) pleaded with Hawkwood to return to Florence's service in 1389, and Donato Velluti, a 14th-century military and political historian. It is almost inconceivable that the commissioners of the monument would not have regarded Hawkwood as a self-interested mercenary, knowing that he often acted against the interests of Florence. After the launching of the design competition, in September 1433, Cosimo and Averardo de' Medici were exiled from Florence, for—among other things—allegedly attempting to embroil Florence in a war with Lucca.

=== Recommissioning ===
After Cosimo's triumphant return to Florence, rather than scrapping the project, in May 1436 the Medici regime hired Uccello to replace the Gaddi and Pesello fresco. Hugh Hudson suggests that it would have been too risky for the Medici to cancel the Albizzi project, so they instead shrewdly modified it to fit their interests. There is, of course, some weakness to attributing the commissioning and recommissioning of the monument to Albizzi or Medici intrigues, as only two (maybe three) of the eight operai on July 13, 1433 were members of the Albizzi faction and only one was a Medici when it was resumed on May 18, 1436; yet the influences of both factions doubtlessly did not require blood relation. Around this time, documents attest to multiple repairs of a nearby window, opening the possibility that the original fresco had experienced water damage, and would have needed to be restored in any case. Others have suggested that the recommissioning was part of the "refurbishing" of the cathedral associated with its rededication as Santa Maria del Fiore by Pope Eugene IV in March 1436. Yet Franco Borsi concludes that "undoubtedly under pressure from the Medici" the operai discarded their plans for a straightforward restoration of the Gaddi fresco and opted for a completely new monument.

=== Uccello ===
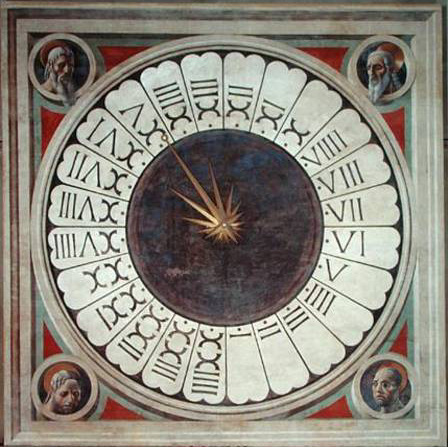
Clock Face with Four Heads of Prophets or Evangelists (1443) is also located in the Florence Cathedral.

The choice of Paolo Uccello (born in Florence in 1397), who had apprenticed for Lorenzo Ghiberti from June 1407, busying himself polishing the "Gates of Paradise", may have been an attempt to find a painter knowledgeable in bronze and statuary, which the fresco was to mimic. For centuries, art historians have regarded Uccello as a less-prominent artist at the time of the Hawkwood commission: he is not mentioned in the preface of Alberti's De Pictura, nor in Domenico Veneziano's 1438 letter to Piero di Cosimo de' Medici listing the major contemporary painters; nor have art historians even attempted to speculate that he studied the frescoes at the Brancacci Chapel. One difficulty for art historians attempting to gauge Uccello's reputation at the time of the Hawkwood's commissioning is the 10-year blind spot in the reconstruction of Uccello's career between 1415—when Uccello was made a member of the Guild of Doctors and Apothecaries (Arte dei Medici e Speziali)—and his trip to Venice in 1425. Similarly, all the works of Uccello's Venetian period are either missing or else of uncertain attribution: Uccello is thought to have made a no-longer-existing mosaic of St. Peter on the façade of St. Mark's Basilica, to have collaborated on the design of architectural structures for the mosaics in the Mascoli Chapel of St. Mark's by Michele Giambono, and possibly to have made some geometrical pattern decorations for the interior of St. Mark's.

Uccello was known to have been in Venice in 1427 and to have returned to Florence by 1431, allowing a second window for historiographical speculation: some say he may have gone to Rome; others say he went directly to Florence. Uccello probably painted the Creation of the Animals and Creation of Adam (c. 1431) in the upper part of one of the bays of the Chiostro Verde (the "Green Cloister") in Santa Maria Novella, which—like the Hawkwood, as specified in its commission—is in the "terra verde" grisaille manner. Perhaps Uccello worked on the stories from the life of the Virgin and St. Stephen in the Chapel of Our Lady of the Assumption in the Prato Cathedral around 1435, although Pope-Hennessy, Pudelko, and Salmi all dispute this attribution.

Thus, the Florence Cathedral is the repository of all the extant works of Uccello whose attribution is firmly rooted in contemporary documents: two murals—the Hawkwood and the Clock Face with Four Heads of Prophets or Evangelists (1443)—and two stained glass windows—Resurrection (1443–1444) and Nativity (1443–1444). The Hawkwood is Uccello's "earliest dated and fully authenticated extant work".

=== Modifications ===
Uccello's Hawkwood was completed, only to be ordered redone by the capo maestro of the Opera del Duomo, on June 28, 1436. Uccello was found not to have been at fault on July 6, and paid for both his first and second versions, the latter of which was finished before August 31. Incidentally, the second version—copied from the original, rather than direct observation—is the only true extant testimony to Hawkwood's appearance. The demanded redesign—which was ordered soon after post-Albizzi members secured a majority among the operai—is at the heart of any discussion about the political implications of the fresco. For centuries, art historians have argued that the rejection was rooted in questions of perspective and color, while more recent scholarship suggests it was the content of the fresco to which the capo maestro objected. The specific objections of the capo maestro are not documented—except that the fresco was "not painted as it should be", but it is clear that only the portion containing the horse and rider was to be erased and redone. A preparatory drawing in the Uffizi with the same static scene is the primary clue to the appearance of the original fresco, in which Hawkwood was apparently more armored, taller, and—along with his horse—in a more militaristic stance. The Hawkwood thus both participated in and reinforced the Quattrocento trend that every Florentine public monument to a soldier of fortune employ a parade horse rather than a battle charger, in less than complete armor, and at a pace more suited for reviewing troops than charging into battle. A study which subjected the drawing to ultraviolet rays confirmed that Uccello had originally depicted Hawkwood as "more threatening", with his baton raised and horse "at the ready".

The fresco's current appearance is not identical to the version redone by Uccello. The frame with Renaissance grotto-esque candelabra decoration was added by Lorenzo di Credi in 1524, when he restored the fresco. In 1688, it was restored again, in refurbishments celebrating the marriage of Ferdinand de' Medici and Violante of Bavaria. The fresco was restored and transferred to canvas in 1842 by Giovanni Rizzoli and moved to the west wall of the Duomo, only to be moved back to the north wall in 1947, after being mounted on a masonite and aluminum support. It has been argued, based on Uccello's alleged use of Masaccio's eye-point perspective, that the painting was originally five feet higher than it stands today. The fully restored fresco was also briefly taken down in 1953–1954 to be shown in the "Quattro Maestri" ("Four Masters") exhibition in Florence.

== Style ==
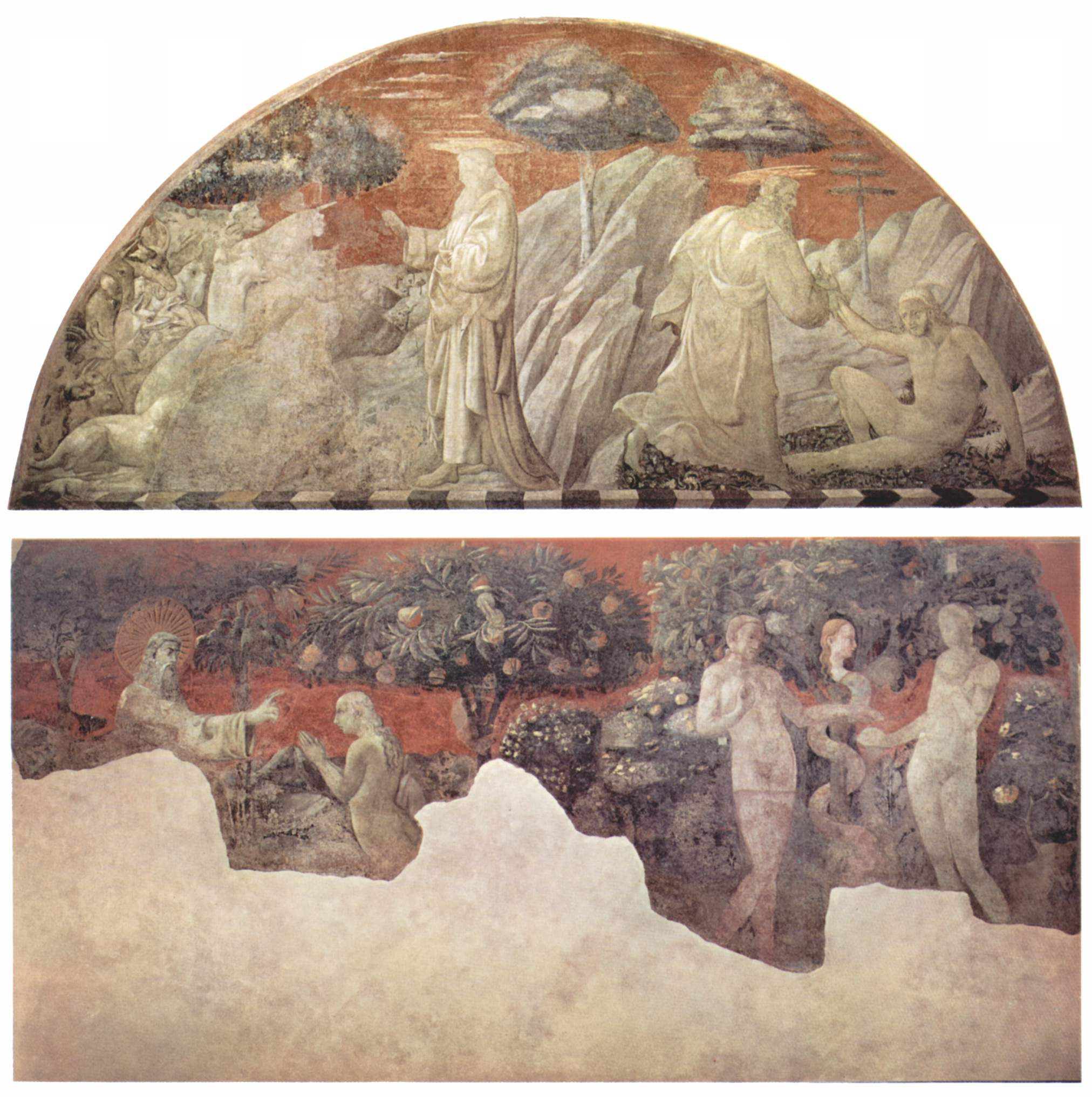
Uccello's Creation of the Animals and Creation of Adam (c. 1431, Above) is also in the "terra verde" style, as required by its commission.

The reworked fresco has been seen as "classicizing" the image of the condottieri, with the terra verde technique giving the conceit of an equestrian bronze statue. The horse's proportions are based loosely upon those prescribed by Alberti in De equo animante, which in turn is based upon the anonymous Sonetto del Cavallo Perfetto; however, in many ways the horse departs radically from Alberti's ideal of a harmonious and "lithe" creature in the style of Leonello d'Este's monument to Niccolò III d'Este, Arco del Cavallo in Ferrara. Furthermore, Uccello's perspective in the Hawkwood monument openly flouted Alberti's conception of perspective as demarcated in De Pictura (1435, translated into Italian as Della Pittura in 1436): the vanishing point is at the eye-level of the spectator rather than within the field of the fresco, for example. Alberti's De re aedificatoria also objected to statues of soldiers and/or lay burials in churches. Although the fresco is often called "monochrome", its background is dark red, the horse and tomb are accented in red, black, white, and orange. The Trompe-l'œil perspective from the base, the chiaroscuro relief-effect of the horse and the rider, and lighting from the left are similar to Masaccio's Holy Trinity. The connection to Masaccio is so strong (or so often reported) that Francesco Albertini actually attributed the work to Massaccio in 1510. However, Uccello's fresco has two viewpoints: the horse and rider are painted as if on level with the spectator, and the cenotaph is seen as if from below.

A variety of explanations have been proposed for this split perspective, which has even been suggested by Frederick Hartt to have been a practical joke. Entangled in these questions of perspective is Vasari's criticism of the horse's raising both its right legs at the same time, which would likely topple the horse, if accomplished. However, it is clear from Uccello's other works that he was not interested in using perspective simply for realism; rather, Uccello "placed in an unnatural, fantastic overall atmosphere, the fruit of this painter's complex and unique imagination". This style has even been cited as an example of synthetic realism in line with the late Gothic movement.

=== Inscription ===
Underscoring the classical elements of the fresco is the Latin inscription, added on December 17, 1436 and composed by Bartolomeo Fortini de Orlandini, son of Benedetto di Ser Landi Fortini, former treasurer of Florence and apprentice of Spinello Alberti, one of the chief negotiators of Florence during the War of the Eight Saints—the first such inscription on an antique sarcophagus in a Florentine painting. The inscription reads: "Ioannes Acutus eques brittanicus dux aetatis suae cautissimus et rei militaris peritissimus habitus est" (John Hawkwood, British knight, most prudent leader of his age and most expert in the art of war). The epitaph, likely a reference to Hawkwood's aforementioned cautissimus ("most prudent") retreat across the Oglio, is borrowed from the eulogy of Roman general Fabius Maximus, who wore down Hannibal by tactical retreat and avoiding battle. The eulogy of Fabius Maximus agrees so distinctly with Quattrocento humanism that some scholars have even dubbed it a "Renaissance fake".

== Interpretation ==
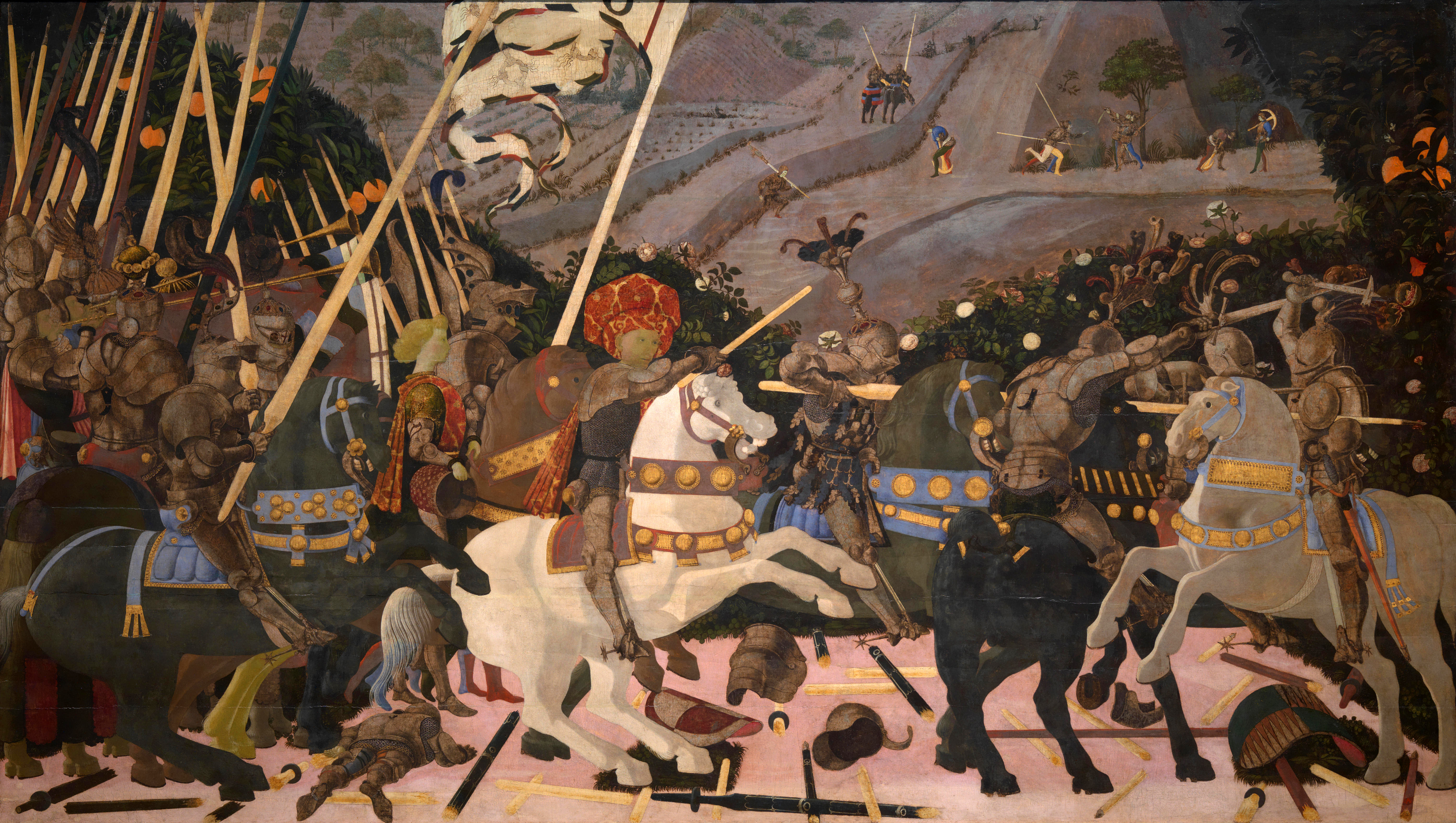
Uccello's paintings in tempera of the Battle of San Romano (pictured: Niccolò Mauruzi da Tolentino at the Battle of San Romano, c. 1438–1440) are also noted for their political implications.

By classicizing the condottieri, the portrait may have represented an opportunity to—as Leonardo Bruni had advocated—"revive the ancient form of tribute" by choosing a "long-dead and uncontroversial subject". Mallett has interpreted the fresco as a Medicean attempt to exalt "the praiseworthiness of condottieri to a populace with mixed feelings". In fact, Cosimo may have allowed the former Albizzi project to go through merely to pave the way for a similar honor for Niccolò da Tolentino (died 1435), a condottiero whom the Medici would have favored over Hawkwood. The Tolentino fresco was commissioned 20 years after the soldier of fortune's death, and was specified in its contract to be painted in "the same manner and form as the Hawkwood". Thus, the recommissioning of the portrait may be read as part of an ongoing debate over the appropriateness of condottieri for a Republic. Bruni raises this subject in De militia (1420), arguing for a standing Florentine militia, especially given the close ties between Tolentino and the Medici. Intending to depict Hawkwood as an "obedient captain conducting an inspection of troops", the conceit of Hawkwood patiently reviewing troops is "suggestive of a loyal communal servant".

The Medici may have wished to emphasize that point that any condottiero, no matter how hostile or fickle, could be bought off and manipulated to Florentine interests and truly Florentinized. Attempts to claim Hawkwood as Florentine were well underway even before his death; for example, Pier Paolo Vergerio the Elder wrote in 1391 that Hawkwood "no longer has any foreign blood ... and has become regenerated more strongly and more healthful in fiber and body under the moderating sky of Italy". Such a viewpoint has even crept into modern scholarship: the 19th-century Italian historian Ercole Ricotti called Hawkwood "the last of the foreign condottieri or the first of the Italian ones"; his 18th-century biography Domenico Maria Manni called him "general captain of Florentine armies" and virtually ignored two decades of Hawkwood's service to other city-states; even in the 20th century, Friedrich Gaupp attempted to characterize Hawkwood's direct attack on Florence as a "marriage proposal".
