= Albertini =

Albertini is an Italian surname. Notable people with the surname include:

- Demetrio Albertini (born 1971), Italian football (soccer) midfielder
- Edda Albertini (1926–1988), Italian actress
- Ellen Albertini Dow (1913–2015), American actress
- Francesco Albertini (died 1510), Italian priest and author
- Gabriele Albertini (born 1950), former mayor of Milano and Member of the European Parliament
- Ignazio Albertini (1644–1685), Italian Baroque musician and composer
- Jean-Benoît Albertini (born 1963), French civil servant
- Joachim Albertini (1748–1812), Polish-Italian composer
- Johannes Baptista von Albertini (1769–1831), German botanist
- Liliana Albertini (1946–2023), Italian politician
- Linda Albertini (born 1894?), Italian silent film actress
- Luigi Albertini (1871–1941), Italian newspaper editor and historian of World War I
- Mario Albertini (1885–1957), Italian swimmer and rower
- Nicolò Albertini (c. 1250 – 1321), medieval Italian Cardinal and statesman
- Paul-Rene Albertini (born 1964), French music executive
- Pierre Albertini (politician) (born 1944), French politician
- Pierre Albertini (judoka) (1942–2017), French judoka
- William Albertini (1913–1994), English cricketer
- Xavier Albertini (born 1971), French politician
