= Tolentino (disambiguation) =

Tolentino is a town and comune in the province of Macerata in the Marche region of central Italy.

Tolentino may also refer to:

== People ==
- Tolentino (surname)

== Other ==
- Battle of Tolentino, fought from 2–3 May 1815 near Tolentino, Kingdom of Naples
- U.S. Tolentino, an Italian association football club located in Tolentino, Marche

== See also ==
- Nicholas of Tolentino (disambiguation)
