= Fortebraccio =

Fortebraccio or Fortebracci may refer to:

- Andrea Fortebraccio, better known as Braccio da Montone (1368–1424), condottiero
- Niccolò Fortebraccio (1389–1435), condottiero
- Oddo Fortebraccio (1410–1425), son of Braccio, condottiero
- Carlo Fortebraccio (1421–1479), son of Braccio, condottiero
- Giampaolo Manfrone (1441–1527), nicknamed Fortebraccio, condottiero
- Mario Melloni (1902–1989), pen name Fortebraccio, journalist

== See also ==
- Fortinbras, known in Italian as Fortebraccio
