= Micheletto =

Micheletto is both an Italian surname and a diminutive of the masculine given name Michele (the Italian form of Michael). Notable people with the name include:

- Micheletto Attendolo (c. 1390 – c. 1451), Italian condottiero
- Micheletto Corella (? – 1508), Italian condottiero
- Giovanni Micheletto (1889–1958), Italian cyclist
