= Tolentino (surname) =

Tolentino is a Spanish surname. Notable people with the surname include:

- Abraham Tolentino (born 1964), Filipino politician
- Arturo Tolentino (1910–2004), Filipino politician and diplomat
- Arvin Tolentino (born 1995), Filipino basketball player
- Aurelio Tolentino (1869–1915), Filipino playwright, poet, journalist, and revolutionary
- Benjamin Tolentino (born 1973), Filipino rower
- Bruce Tolentino (born 1953), Filipino economist, author, professor, and economic policymaker
- Bruno Tolentino (1940–2007), Brazilian poet and intellectual
- Cristoforo da Tolentino (died 1462), Italian condottiero
- Elias Tolentino (1942–2017), Filipino basketball player
- Francis Tolentino (born 1960), Filipino politician and lawyer
- Guillermo Tolentino (1890–1976), Filipino sculptor
- Jhett Tolentino (born 1976), Filipino entertainment producer
- Jia Tolentino (born 1988), American writer and editor
- Jorge Tolentino (born 1963), Cape Verdean politician, writer, diplomat and lawyer
- José Tolentino (born 1961), baseball player
- José Tolentino de Mendonça (born 1965), Portuguese cardinal of the Catholic Church
- Julie Tolentino (born 1984), American visual and performance artist, dancer, and choreographer
- Kat Tolentino (born 1995), Filipino-Canadian volleyball player
- Lorna Tolentino (born 1961), Filipino actress, host and executive producer
- Manny Tolentino (born 1966), former tennis player from the Philippines
- Miggy Tolentino (born 1996), Filipino actor, model and television personality.
- Nicholas of Tolentino (c. 1246 – 1305), Italian saint and mystic
- Niccolò da Tolentino (c. 1350 – 1435), Italian condottiero
- Nicolau Tolentino de Almeida (1740–1811), Portuguese satirical poet
- Regine Tolentino (born 1978), Filipino corporate and TV host, actress, dancer, fashion designer, social media influencer, model and businesswoman
- Shirley Tolentino (1943–2010), New Jersey state court judge
- Thea Tolentino (born 1996), Filipino actress
- Thomas of Tolentino (c. 1255 – 1321), medieval Franciscan missionary
- Tots Tolentino (born 1959), jazz musician from the Philippines
- Wanda Soto Tolentino, Puerto Rican politician
- Wilbert Tolentino (born 1975), Chinese-Filipino entrepreneur from the Philippines
