= Micheletto Attendolo =

Italian condottiero

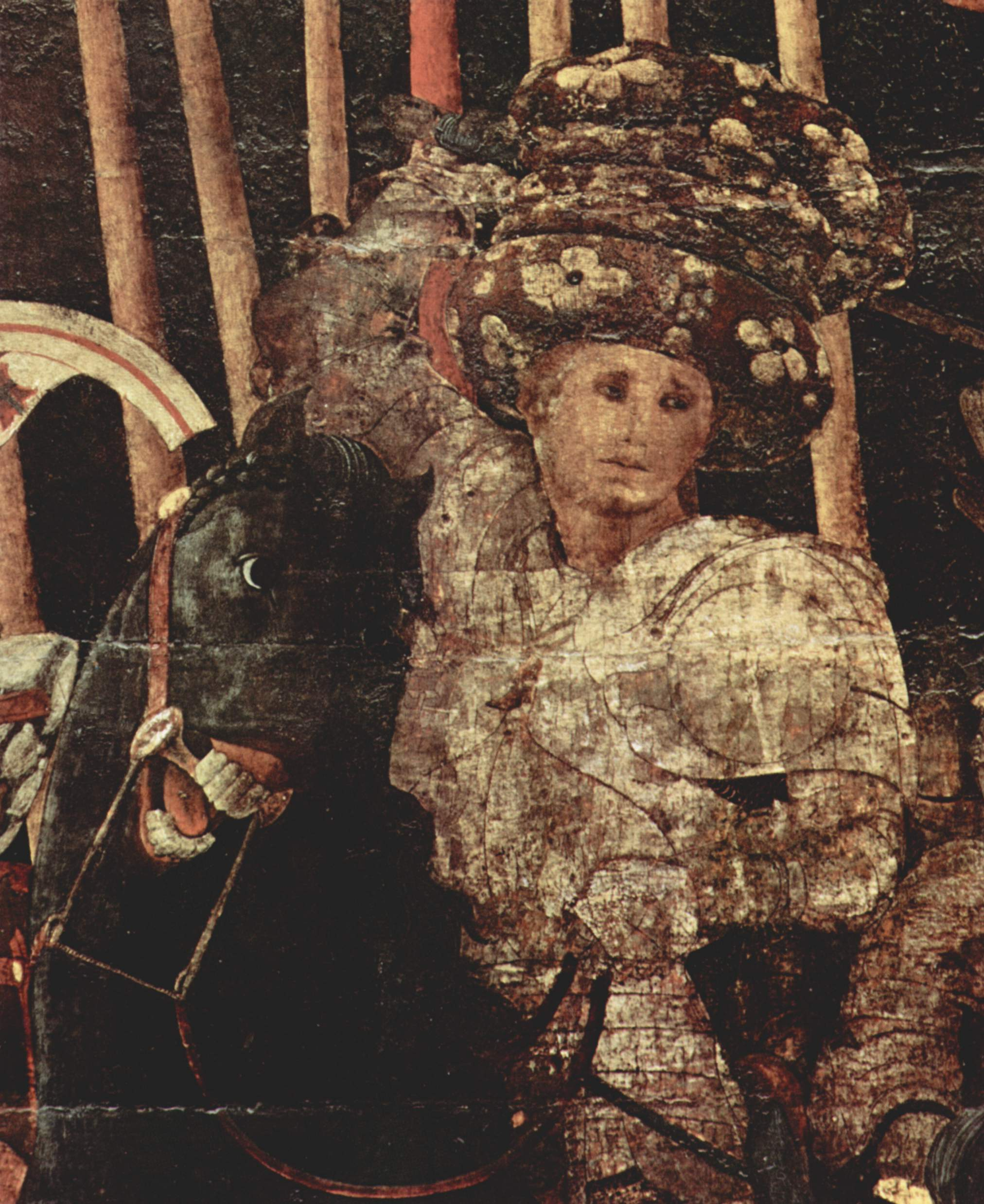
- Micheletto Attendolo in The decisive attack of Micheletto Attendolo at San Romano, part of The Battle of San Romano triptych by Paolo Uccello. Musée du Louvre, Paris.

Gran Connestabile of the Kingdom of Naples

Personal details
- Born: 1370 Cotignola
- Died: February 1463 (aged 92–93) Palazzolo sull'Oglio
- Children: Perino Attendolo; Raimondo Attendolo; Pietro Antonio Attendolo
- Parent: Bartolo Attendolo (father)
- Relatives: Lorenzo Attendolo; Muzio Attendolo Sforza; Olivo; Marco; Francesco Sforza; Niccolò Fortebraccio; Giacomo di Vico
- Occupation: Condottiero

Military service
- Allegiance: Republic of Florence
- Commands: Venetian army
- Battles/wars: Battle of Casalecchio; Battle of L'Aquila; Battle of San Romano; Battle of Anghiari; Battle of Caravaggio

Micheletto Attendolo, also called Micheletto da Cotignola, (c. 1370 – February 1463) was an Italian condottiero. He was seigneur of Acquapendente, Potenza, Alianello, Castelfranco Veneto and Pozzolo Formigaro.

Born in Cotignola, he was the cousin of the more famous Muzio Attendolo Sforza and Francesco Sforza. Together with the latter and Francesco Sforza, he was imprisoned in Naples by the Queen Joanna II of Naples in December 1415. Later he fought against Braccio da Montone for her, taking part in the conflict in the Abruzzi of 1424: after Muzio's drowning, he commanded the vanguard at the Battle of L'Aquila.

Later he was at the service of Pope Martin V and of the Republic of Florence, being decisive at the Battle of San Romano against the Sienese. In 1434, after the treaty between Pope Eugene IV and Joanna (1434), Attendolo was made Gran Connestabile (commander-in-chief) of the Kingdom of Naples. Later he fought for the Neapolitan pretender Rene of Anjou.

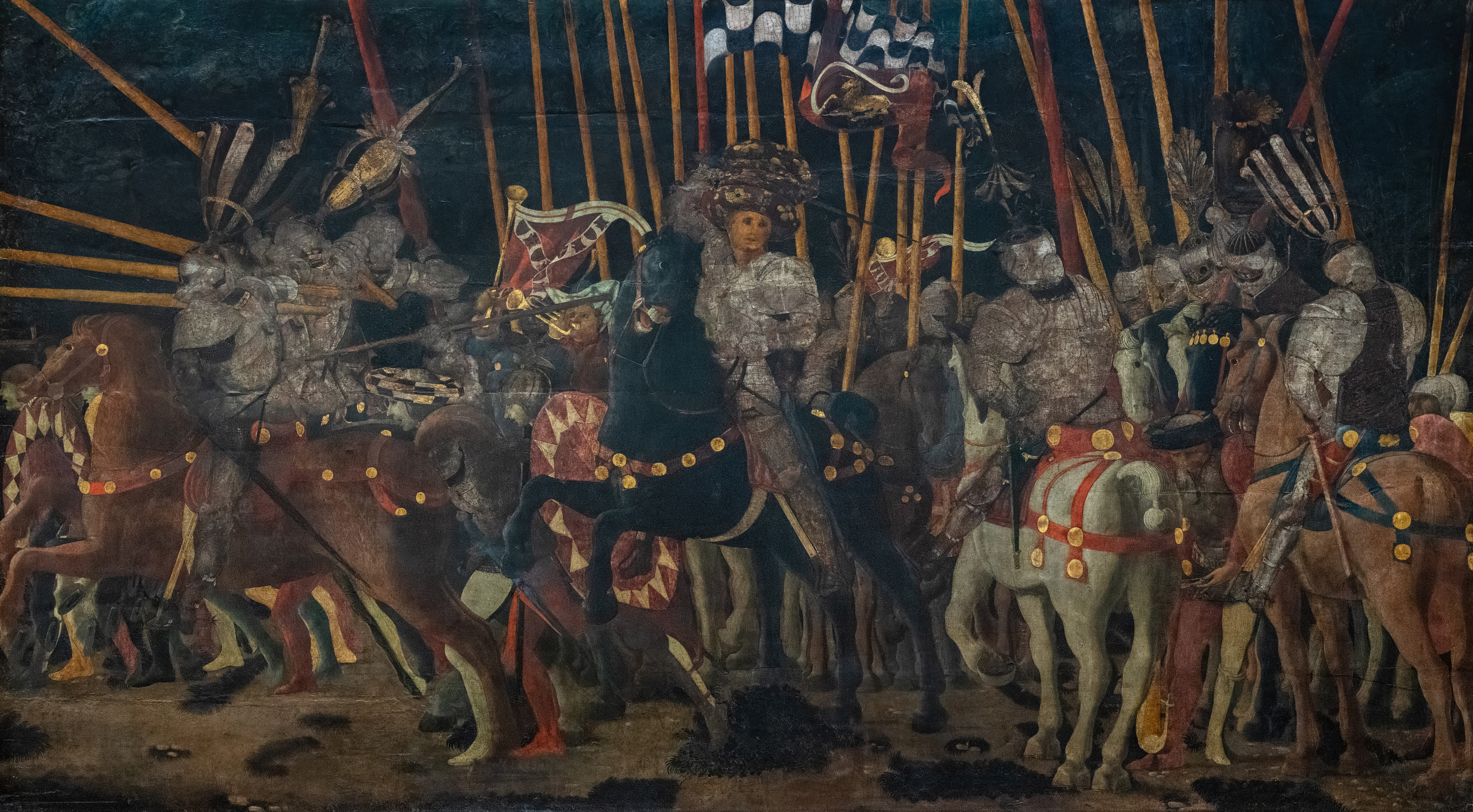
The decisive attack of Micheletto Attendolo at San Romano, part of The Battle of San Romano triptych by Paolo Uccello. Musée du Louvre, Paris.

Subsequently, he fought mostly alongside Francesco Sforza and was victorious against Niccolò Piccinino at the Battle of Anghiari (1440). The following year he replaced Gattamelata as the supreme commander of the Venetian army. He clashed with Sforza, who now led the army of the Repubblica Ambrosiana of Milan, at the battle of Caravaggio (15 September 1448), being severely defeated.

After this setback, Attendolo lost his position and was confined at Conegliano. He died three years later, probably at Palazzolo sull'Oglio.

== See also ==
- Wars in Lombardy

== Bibliography ==
- Rendina, Claudio (2004). I capitani di ventura (in Italian). Rome: Newton Compton. p. 480. ISBN 9788882899745.
