= The Battle of San Romano =

Set of three paintings by Paolo Uccello

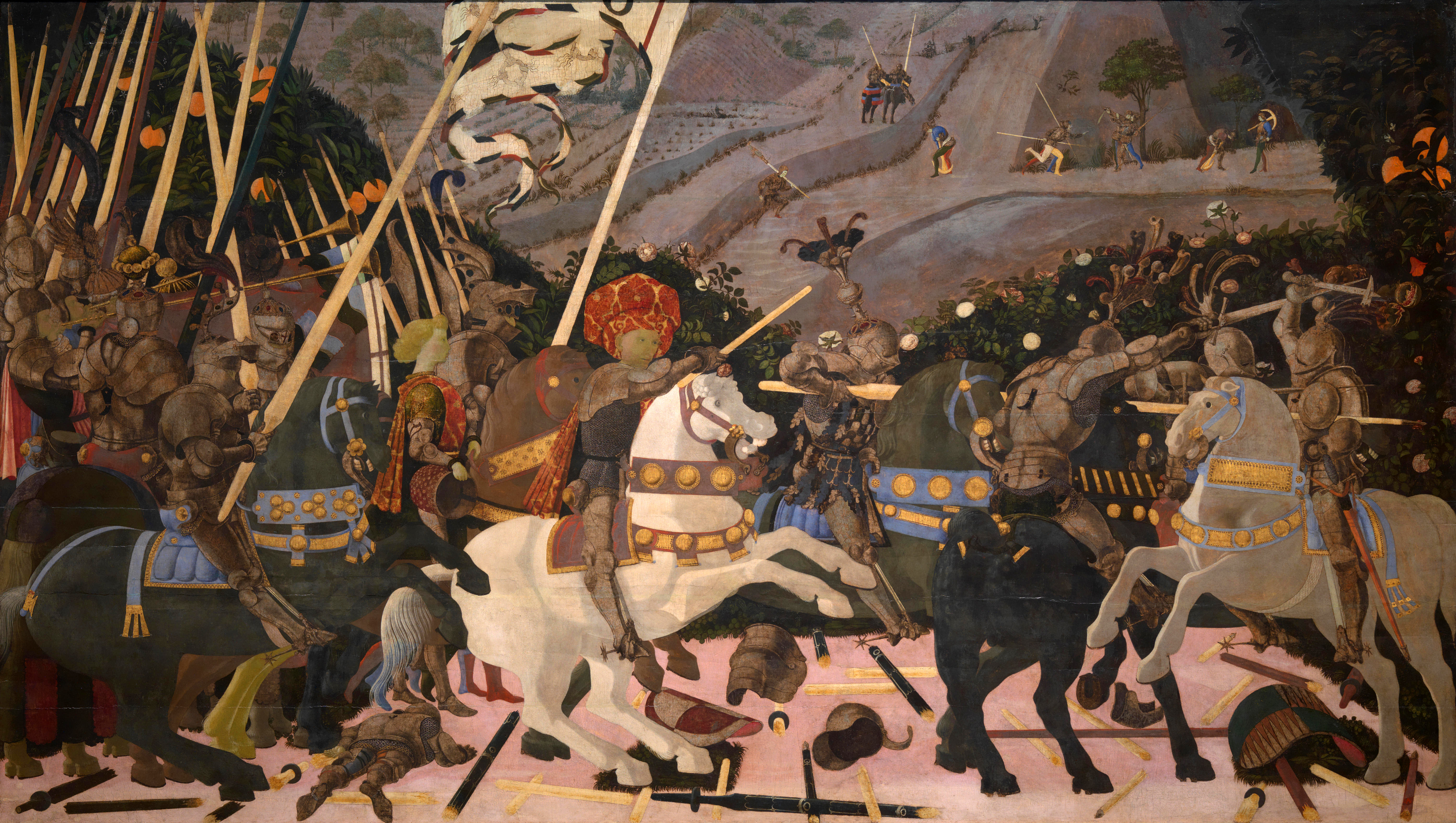
- Niccolò Mauruzi da Tolentino at the Battle of San Romano
- Artist: Paolo Uccello
- Year: c. 1435–1460
- Type: egg tempera with walnut oil and linseed oil on poplar
- Dimensions: 182 cm × 323 cm (72 in × 127 in)
- Location: National Gallery, Galleria degli Uffizi, Musée du Louvre

The Battle of San Romano is a set of three paintings by the Florentine painter Paolo Uccello depicting events that took place at the Battle of San Romano between Florentine and Sienese forces in 1432. They are significant as revealing the development of linear perspective in early Italian Renaissance painting, and are unusual as a major secular commission. The paintings are in egg tempera on wooden panels, each over 3 metres long. According to the National Gallery, the panels were commissioned by a member of the Bartolini Salimbeni family in Florence sometime between 1435 and 1460. The paintings were much admired in the 15th century; Lorenzo de' Medici so coveted them that he purchased one and had the remaining two forcibly removed to the Palazzo Medici. They are now divided among three collections, the National Gallery, London, the Galleria degli Uffizi, Florence, and the Musée du Louvre, Paris.

== Subject ==
The three paintings are:

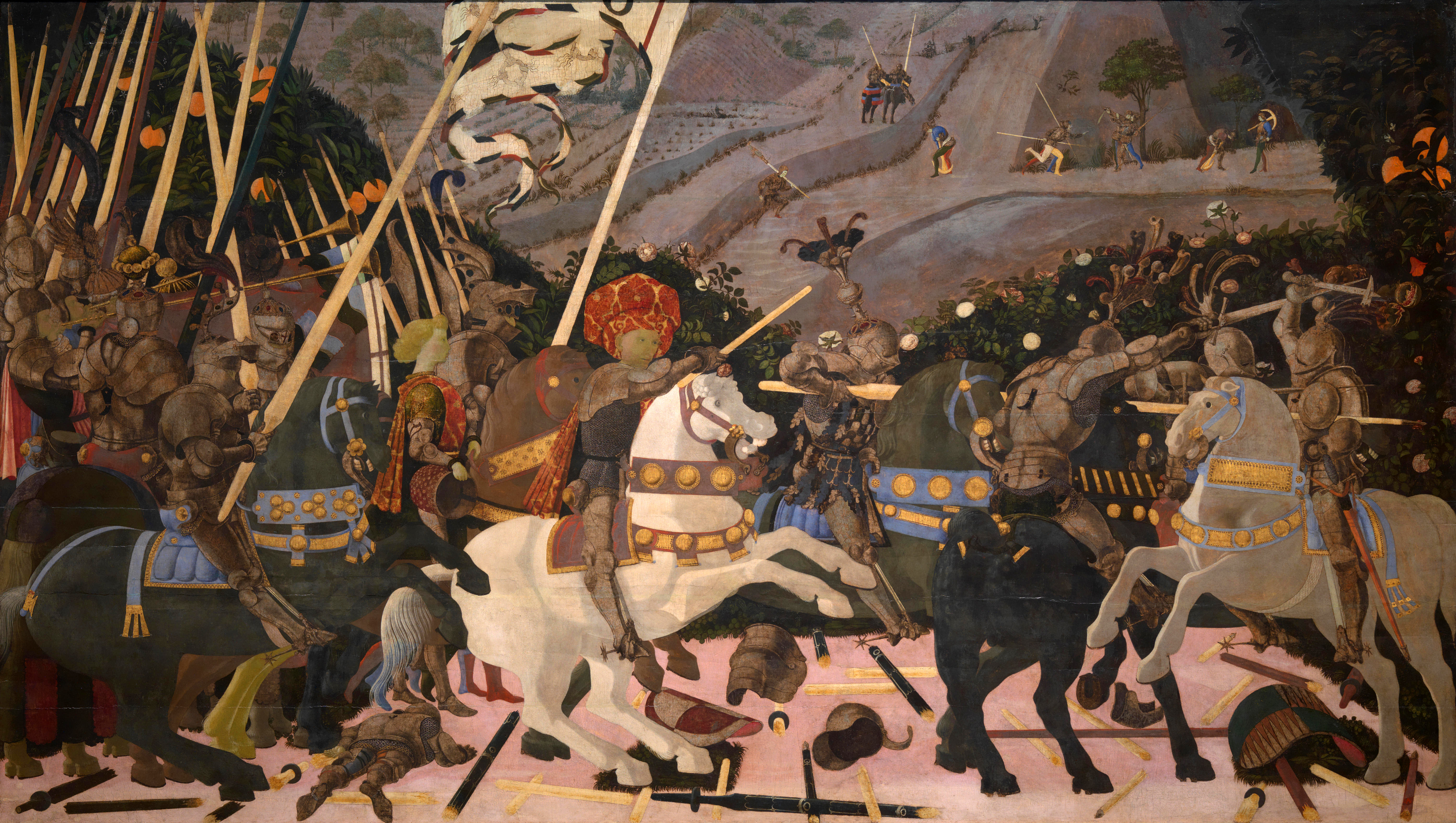
Niccolò Mauruzi da Tolentino at the Battle of San Romano (probably c. 1438–1440), egg tempera with walnut oil and linseed oil on poplar, 182 × 320 cm, National Gallery, London.

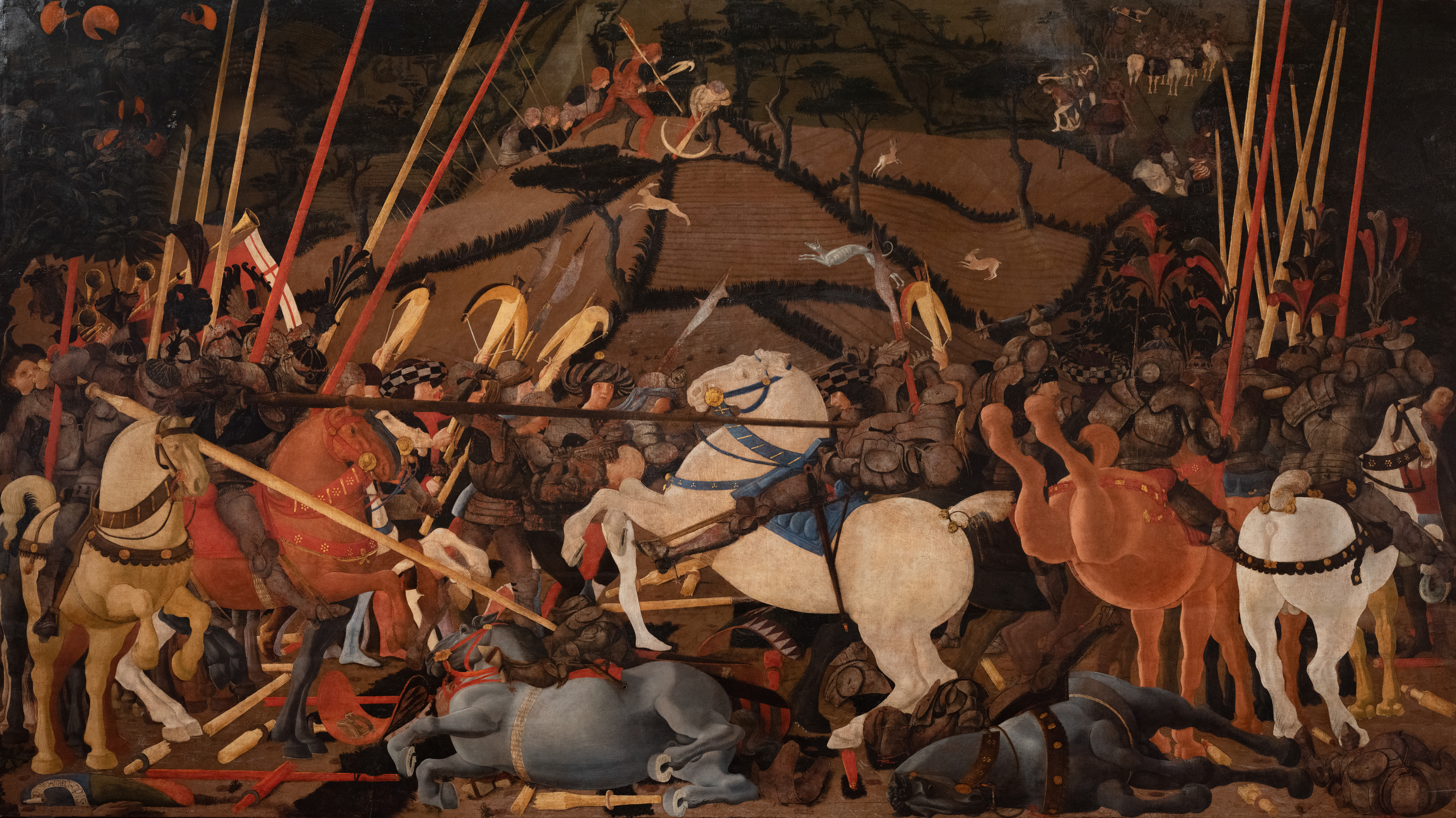
Niccolò Mauruzi da Tolentino unseats Bernardino della Carda at the Battle of San Romano (dating uncertainc. 1435–1455), tempera on wood, 182 × 320 cm, Galleria degli Uffizi, Florence

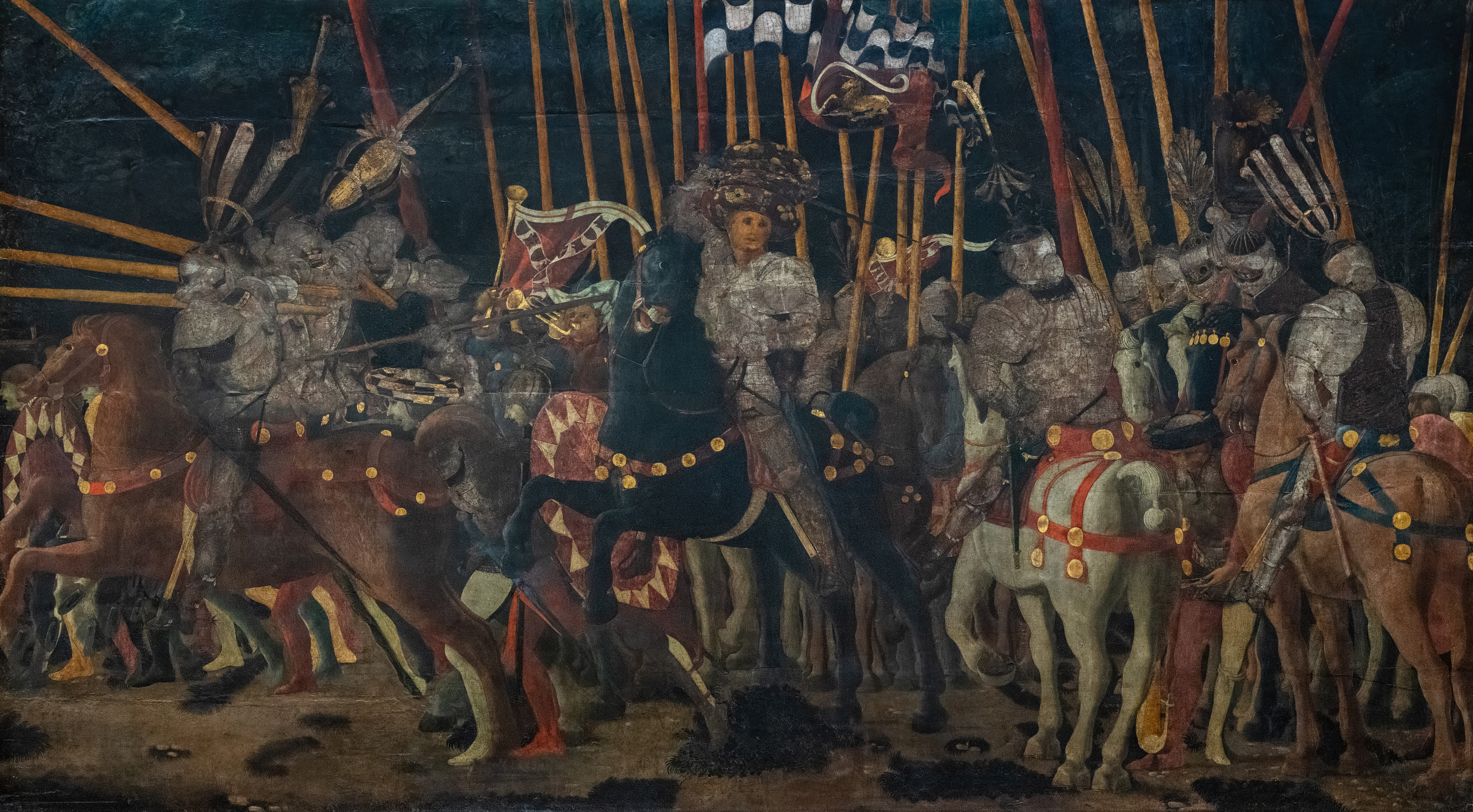
The Counterattack of Michelotto da Cotignola at the Battle of San Romano (c. 1455), wood panel, 182 × 317 cm, Musée du Louvre, Paris

The Uffizi panel was probably designed to be the central painting of the triptych and is the only one signed by the artist. The sequence most widely agreed among art historians is: London, Florence, Paris, although others have been proposed. They may represent different times of day: dawn (London), mid-day (Florence) and dusk (Paris) – the battle lasted six or seven hours.

In the London painting, Niccolò da Tolentino, with his large gold and red patterned hat, is seen leading the Florentine cavalry. He had a reputation for recklessness, and doesn't even wear a helmet, though he sent two messengers (the departure of the two messengers, depicted centre, top) to tell his allied army of Attendolo to hurry to his aid as he is facing a superior force. In the foreground, broken lances and a dead soldier are carefully aligned into orthogonals, so as to create an impression of perspective. Similar to that of a tapestry, the landscape rises up in a picture plane as opposed to receding deeply into space. This illusion of a backdrop and a perspective theme resembling a stage, depicts the war as a theatrical ceremony. The three paintings were designed to be hung high on three different walls of a room, and the perspective designed with that height in mind, which accounts for many apparent anomalies in the perspective when seen in photos or at normal gallery height.

Many areas of the paintings were covered with gold and silver leaf. While the gold leaf, such as that found on the decorations of the bridles, has remained bright, the silver leaf, found particularly on the armour of the soldiers, has oxidized to a dull grey or black. The original impression of the burnished silver would have been dazzling. All of the paintings, especially that in the Louvre, have suffered from time and early restoration, and many areas have lost their modelling.

The panels were a subject in the BBC series The Private Life of a Masterpiece (2005).

== References in popular culture ==
The dark horse in the Louvre panel, mounted by Micheletto Attendolo (da Cotignola), can be seen painted in a tapestry, in the first segment ("Metzengerstein") of the 1968 omnibus film Spirits of the Dead. In the 4th Episode (Lucrezia's Wedding) of the 2011 TV Series The Borgias, the London and Louvre panel is shown adorning the dining hall walls of the Florentine Prince when cardinal Della Rovere visits him in Florence. In A Room with a View (1985 film) one scene is at the National Gallery in London with the painting in the background.

== See also ==
External media

Audio
- Personal response: Serena Ferrente

Video
- Smarthistory – Uccello's The Battle of San Romano

- Italian Renaissance painting
- Funerary Monument to Sir John Hawkwood
- Equestrian Statue of Niccolò da Tolentino
- The Annunciation and Seven Saints by Filippo Lippi, also from the decoration of Palazzo Medici
- 100 Great Paintings, 1980 BBC series
