= Nicholas of Tolentino (disambiguation) =

Nicholas of Tolentino, San Nicolas de Tolentino or San Nicolás de Tolentino may refer to Nicholas of Tolentino, a Christian saint from Italy. Other references include:

== People ==
- Niccolò da Tolentino, an Italian condottiero

== Places ==
- La Aldea de San Nicolás, a municipality in the Canary Islands
- San Nicolas, Ilocos Norte, a municipality in the Philippines
- San Nicolás Tolentino, a municipality in San Luis Potosí, Mexico
- San Nicolás Tolentino, Puebla, an ejido in Izúcar de Matamoros (municipality), Puebla, Mexico

== Churches ==
- Basilica of San Nicola in Tolentino, Marche, Italy
- San Nicola da Tolentino agli Orti Sallustiani, in Rome, Italy
- Church of Tolentini, Venice (San Nicolò da Tolentino), in Venice, Italy
- Ermita de San Nicolas de Tolentino, a chapel in Makati, Philippines
- San Nicolas de Tolentino Parish Church, a church in Ilocos Norte, Philippines
- San Nicolas de Tolentino Parish Church, a Catholic church in Pampanga, Philippines
- San Nicolas de Tolentino Parish Church, a church in Quezon City, Philippines
- San Nicolas de Tolentino Parish Church in Balaoan, La Union, Philippines
- San Nicolás Tolentino Temple and Ex-Monastery in Actopan, Hidalgo, Mexico

== See also ==
- Church of San Nicolás (disambiguation)
