= Leone Sforza =

Italian condottiero

Leone Sforza (May 1406 – July 1440) was an Italian condottiero, a member of the House of Sforza.

Born at Castelfiorentino, he was the son of Muzio Attendolo, and brother to Alessandro and Francesco Sforza, both successful military leaders and seigniors.

In 1415 he was jailed in the Castel Nuovo of Naples together with his father and his brothers. Leone fought mainly alongside Francesco, and in 1432 he escorted to Piacenza the emperor Sigismund. In 1434–1435 he fought against Niccolò Fortebraccio in Lazio and Umbria: taken prisoner, he was freed after the death of that condottiero.

Leone Sforza was killed during the siege of Caravaggio of 1440, while commanding the Venetian troops.
