= List of condottieri =

Condottieri (singular condottiero) were mercenary leaders employed by Italian city-states and seignories from the late Middle Ages until the mid-17th century. Niccolò Machiavelli listed the "most noted" of the condottieri remembered in his day:

The most noticed among the latter were Carmagnola, Francesco Sforza, Niccolò Piccinino the pupil of Braccio, Agnolo della Pergola, Lorenzo di Micheletto Attendolo, il Tartaglia, Giacopaccio, Cecolini da Perugia, Niccolò da Tolentino, Guido Torello, Antonia dal Ponte ad Era, and many others. (History of Florence, I,vii])

== Thirteenth century ==
- Ruggiero da Flor (c. 1268–1305), was a condottiere active in Aragonese Sicily, Italy, and the Byzantine Empire. He was the commander of the Great Catalan Company and held the title Count of Malta.
- Ruggiero da Lauria (c. 1245–1305), admiral in Aragonese service, who was the commander of the fleet of the Crown of Aragon during the War of the Sicilian Vespers.
- Malatesta da Verucchio (1212–1312), founder of the Malatesta dynasty, master of Rimini in 1295. Father of Giovanni Malatesta (d. 1304) who killed his wife Francesca da Rimini, who had taken his handsome brother Piero for a lover, earning them all places in Dante's Inferno.
- Castruccio Castracani (1281–1328), Lord of Lucca, when exiled from Lucca in 1300, fought in Flanders but was welcomed back to Lucca, once it was in the hands of Uguccione della Faggiuola, Lord of Pisa, a fellow soldier of fortune. In 1315 he and his followers took part in the Battle of Montecatini against the Florentine Guelphs, and the following year he was acclaimed Lord of Lucca. Soon he was in possession of Pistoia, which put him in confrontation once more with Florence, whose forces he overcame at Altopascio in 1325. However, at Rome in 1328 for the coronation of the Emperor Ludwig IV, of Bavaria who made him Imperial Vicar General for Lucca and Pistoia, he died under obscure circumstances—perhaps of malaria—just as he was considering a further attack upon Florence.
- Uguccione della Faggiuola (c. 1250 –1319) was a condottiero, and Ghibelline magistrate of Pisa, Lucca and Forlì (from 1297).

== Fourteenth century ==
- Walter VI of Brienne (c. 1304–1356), Duke of Athens, a French adventurer, was in command in Florence in 1325 as the representative of the Duke of Calabria, eldest son of the King of Naples, to whom the commune of Florence had turned for protection after their severe defeat at Altopascio, at the hands of Castruccio Castracani
- Pier Saccone Tarlati di Pietramala (1261–1356) of Arezzo
- Rolando de' Rossi (c. 1285–1345), lord of Parma, condottiero after 1335
- Cangrande della Scala (1291–1329)
- Galeotto I Malatesta (c. 1305–1385)
- Luchino dal Verme (c. 1320–1372)
- John Hawkwood, Giovanni Acuto (c. 1320–1394), arrived in Italy c. 1360, at the head of the White Company served Pisa against Florence, then the Visconti in Milan, then Pope Gregory XI, and finally Florence. He was appointed Capitano del popolo, married an illegitimate daughter of Bernabò Visconti, duke of Milan. Memorialized by a fresco monument in Florence Cathedral.
- Alberico da Barbiano (1344–1409)
- Angelo Broglio da Lavello (1350 or 1370–1421), known as Tartaglia, long-standing rival of Muzio Sforza. He served the Republic of Florence, then Ladislaus of Naples and the Pope Martin V.
- Jacopo dal Verme (1350–1409)
- Ridolfo II da Varano di Camerino (1355–1384)
- Facino Cane (c. 1360–1412) began in the service of Gian Galeazzo Visconti, in his struggles against Mantua. After Visconti's death in 1402 he adventured throughout northern Italy, gained a Byzantine princess for a bride – who brought his lands to Filippo Maria Visconti after the adventurer's demise.
- Braccio da Montone (1368–1424) rival to Muzio 'Sforza', bitter rivals who died within weeks of one another in 1424, leaving their sons to carry on their feud. Braccio was master of Perugia in 1416 and briefly controlled the city of Rome. He was killed laying siege to Aquila on behalf of Ladislas, king of Naples.
- Carlo I Malatesta (1368–1429)
- Muzio Attendolo (1369–1424), called Sforza ("Strong"). Condottiere from the Romagna serving the Angevin kings of Naples; the most successful dynast of the condottieri after receiving from Joan II of Naples the title of grand connétable (Grand Constable in English?).
- Pippo Spano (1369–1426), served the Empire.
- Erasmo da Narni (1370–1443), better known as "Gattamelata", the butcher's boy from Narni immortalized in Donatello's mounted sculpture (1447) the first equestrian bronze since Antiquity. He began with Montone, served Pope and Florence equally, served Venice in 1434 in the battles with the Visconti of Milan, then became dictator of Padua in 1437.
- Ladislaus of Naples the Magnanimous (1377– 1414) was the king of Naples
- Niccolò Piccinino (1380–1444), known as "Tiny Nick", was in arms at the age of 13. In 1424, at the death of his commander, he took charge of the company of mercenaries and sold his services to Florence, then to Milan in 1426. His rapacious ambition made his employer, the duke of Milan, uneasy, who decided instead to hire Francesco Sforza, the personal enemy of Piccinino. The growing rivalry between the two eventually led to a showdown in 1443. Defeated, Piccinino died next year.
- Francesco Bussone da Carmagnola (1390–1432), better known as "Count of Carmagnola", fought for Filippo Maria Visconti of Milan, before taking orders from the republics of Florence and of Venice. Suspected of treasonous actions, he was executed in 1432.
- Giovanni Vitelleschi (1396-1440), the condottiere of Pope Eugene IV, who made him archbishop of Florence and a cardinal, while he commanded the papal armies against René of Anjou in Naples.

== Fifteenth century ==
- Giovanni Giustiniani Longo (1418–1453), Genoese captain and protostrator of the Eastern Roman (Byzantine) Empire.
- Scaramuccia da Forlì (d. 1450)
- Francesco Sforza (1401–1466), the last of the great condottiere serving Filippo Maria Visconti; he proceeded to seize the throne of the Duchy of Milan after the latter's death, establishing the Sforza dynasty there.
- Sigismondo Pandolfo Malatesta (1417–1468), lord of Rimini, a capable condottiere in the family tradition, was hired by the Venetians against the Turks (unsuccessfully), 1465, and was patron of Leone Battista Alberti, whose Tempio Malatestiano at Rimini is one of the first entirely classical buildings of the Renaissance.
- Bartolomeo Colleoni (c. 1400–1475), immortalized in Andrea del Verrocchio's equestrian bronze, at Campo dei Santi Giovanni e Paolo, Venice. He began under Braccio da Montone and then under Muzio Sforza. He switched sides between Milan and Venice, before settling his fortunes on Venice, where he was general for many years. A great patron of artists.
- Onorata Rodiani (1403–1452), was a "semi-legendary" Italian painter and condottiere.
- Federico III da Montefeltro (1422–1482), lord of Urbino and humanist intellectual.
- Francesco II of Gonzaga (1466–1519), commanded the Italian armies at the Battle of Fornovo.
- Cesare Borgia (1475–1507), Duke of Valentino, the illegitimate son of Pope Alexander VI (Rodrigo Borgia) and brother to Lucrezia Borgia. Commanded the papal armies.
- Micheletto Corella (d. 1508), served Cesare Borgia and was known as Valentino's executioner.
- Nicolò di Pitigliano (d. 1510), active until 1510; led the defense of Padua against the Holy Roman Emperor Maximilian I.
- Bartolomeo d'Alviano (1455–1515), active 1494–1515; served under the Spanish at the Battle of the Garigliano; commanded the Venetian forces at the Battle of Agnadello, then fought for the Republic until the end of the War of the League of Cambrai.
- Gian Giacomo Trivulzio (c. 1441–1518), active 1499–1515; betrayed Ludovico Sforza to Louis XII of France and became one of the latter's most experienced commanders during the Italian Wars.
- Prospero Colonna (1452–1523), served Spain during the Italian Wars.

== Sixteenth century ==
- Francesco Maria I della Rovere (1490–1538), duke of Urbino, served the Papacy and Venice during the Italian Wars
- Gian Galeazzo Sanvitale (1496–1550)
- Sampieru Corsu (1498–1567), served France in the Italian Wars.
- Giovanni dalle Bande Nere (1498–1526), son of Caterina Sforza and father of Cosimo I de' Medici, fought in the service of Pope Leo X and Pope Clement VII in the Italian Wars.
- Ferrante Gonzaga (1507–1557)
- Piero Strozzi (c. 1510–1558)

== Seventeenth century ==
- Torquato Conti (1591–1636), served the Papacy and the Holy Roman Empire.
- Luigi Mattei (?–1675), served both Pope Urban VIII and Pope Innocent X during the Wars of Castro.
- Mattias de' Medici (1613–1667), commanded the troops of the Republic of Venice, the Grand Duchy of Tuscany, the Duchy of Parma and the Duchy of Modena and Reggio during the Wars of Castro.
- Raimondo Montecuccoli (1608/09–1680), served Francesco I d'Este, Duke of Modena during the First War of Castro.
- Achille d'Étampes de Valençay (1593–1646), served the papacy during the Wars of Castro.
- Cornelio Malvasia (1603–1664), cavalry commander loyal to the papacy during the First War of Castro, later a commander of the French army in Italy and a military advisor to Alfonso IV d'Este, Duke of Modena.
