= William Albertini =

English cricketer

Personal information
- Full name: William Reynolds James Albertini
- Born: 21 January 1913; Kensington, London, England
- Died: 2 May 1994 (aged 81); Barnard, Vermont, United States of America
- Batting: Unknown
- Bowling: Unknown

Domestic team information
- Years: Team
- 1937/38: Sir TEW Brinckman's XI
- 1936–1938: Berkshire

Career statistics
Competition	First-class
Matches	3
Runs scored	50
Batting average	16.66
100s/50s	–/–
Top score	15*
Balls bowled	216
Wickets	3
Bowling average	38.00
5 wickets in innings	–
10 wickets in match	–
Best bowling	1/20
Catches/stumpings	–/–
- Source: Cricinfo, 22 November 2011

William Reynolds James Albertini (21 January 1913 – 2 May 1994) was an English first-class cricketer. Albertini's batting and bowling styles are unknown. He was born at Kensington, London as William Reynolds James Diaz-Albertini, later changing his name to William Reynolds James Albertini. Later in his life, he would revert to his birth name. He was educated at Tonbridge School.

Albertini was his debut for Berkshire in the 1936 Minor Counties Championship against Hertfordshire. He played Minor counties cricket for the county till 1938, making a total of twenty appearances. He was also a part of Sir Theodore Brinckman's team which toured Argentina in 1937/38, making three first-class appearances on the tour against the Argentine national team. He scored a total of 50 runs in these three matches, which came at an average of 16.66, with a high score of 15 not out. With the ball, he took 3 wickets at a bowling average of 38.00, with best figures of 1/20.

He died on 2 May 1994 at Barnard, Vermont, United States of America. He is buried at the Christ Church Frederica Cemetery in St. Simons, Georgia.
