= Battle of San Romano =

1432 battle between Florence and Siena

Coordinates: 43.6890°N 10.7581°E

- Part of Wars in Lombardy
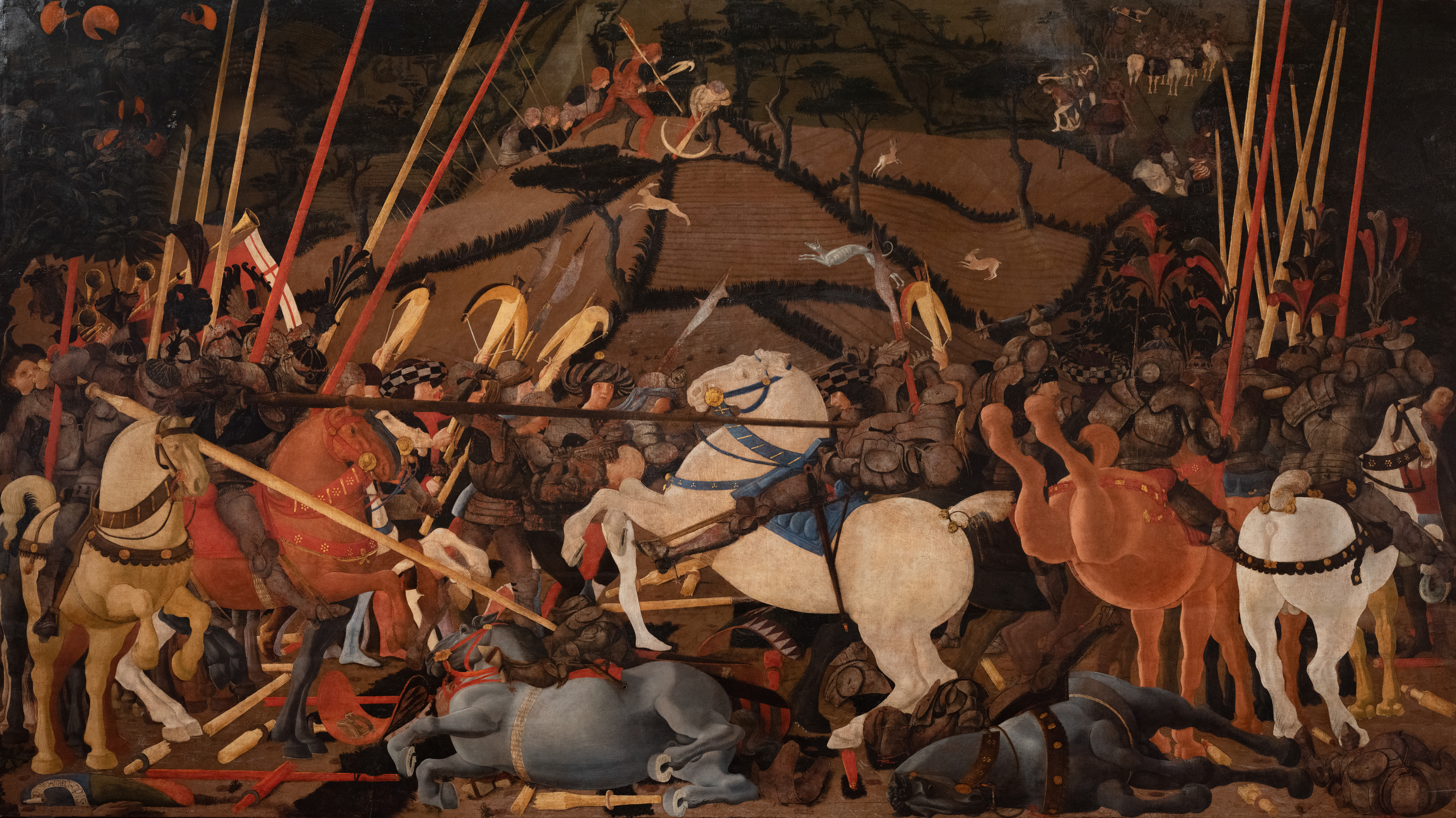
- Niccolò da Tolentino leading the Florentine cavalry
Date	1 June 1432
Location	San Romano, Pisa, Italy
Result	Florentine victory (disputed)

Belligerents
Republic of Florence	Republic of Siena

Commanders and leaders
Niccolò da Tolentino; Micheletto Attendolo	Francesco Piccinino

Strength
4,000 cavalry, 2,000 infantry	

Casualties and losses
400 cavalry taken prisoner	600 cavalry and unknown infantry taken prisoner

The Battle of San Romano was fought on 1 June 1432, in San Romano, some 30 miles outside Florence, between the troops of Florence, commanded by Niccolò da Tolentino, and Siena, under Francesco Piccinino. The outcome is generally considered favourable to the Florentines, but in the Sienese chronicles it was considered a victory. As the 1430s began Florence had found itself in conflict with the rival city state of Lucca, and her allies, Siena and Milan.

The Florentine deployed about 4,000 horse and 2,000 infantry. The clash, which lasted for some six or seven hours, consisted of a series of heavy cavalry fights. It was decided by the intervention of a second cavalry corps commanded by Micheletto Attendolo.

== Paintings ==
The battle was depicted in three large paintings by the Italian Renaissance artist, Paolo Uccello: The Battle of San Romano. Today the three panels are separated and located in galleries in London, Paris, and Florence:

- Niccolò Mauruzi da Tolentino at the Battle of San Romano (probably about 1438–1440), egg tempera with walnut oil and linseed oil on poplar, 182 x 320 cm, National Gallery, London.
- Niccolò Mauruzi da Tolentino unseats Bernardino della Ciarda at the Battle of San Romano (dating uncertain, about 1435 to 1455), tempera on wood, 182 x 320 cm, Galleria degli Uffizi, Florence
- The Counterattack of Michelotto da Cotignola at the Battle of San Romano (about 1455), wood panel, 182 x 317 cm, Musée du Louvre, Paris
