= Lorenzo Attendolo =

Italian condottiero

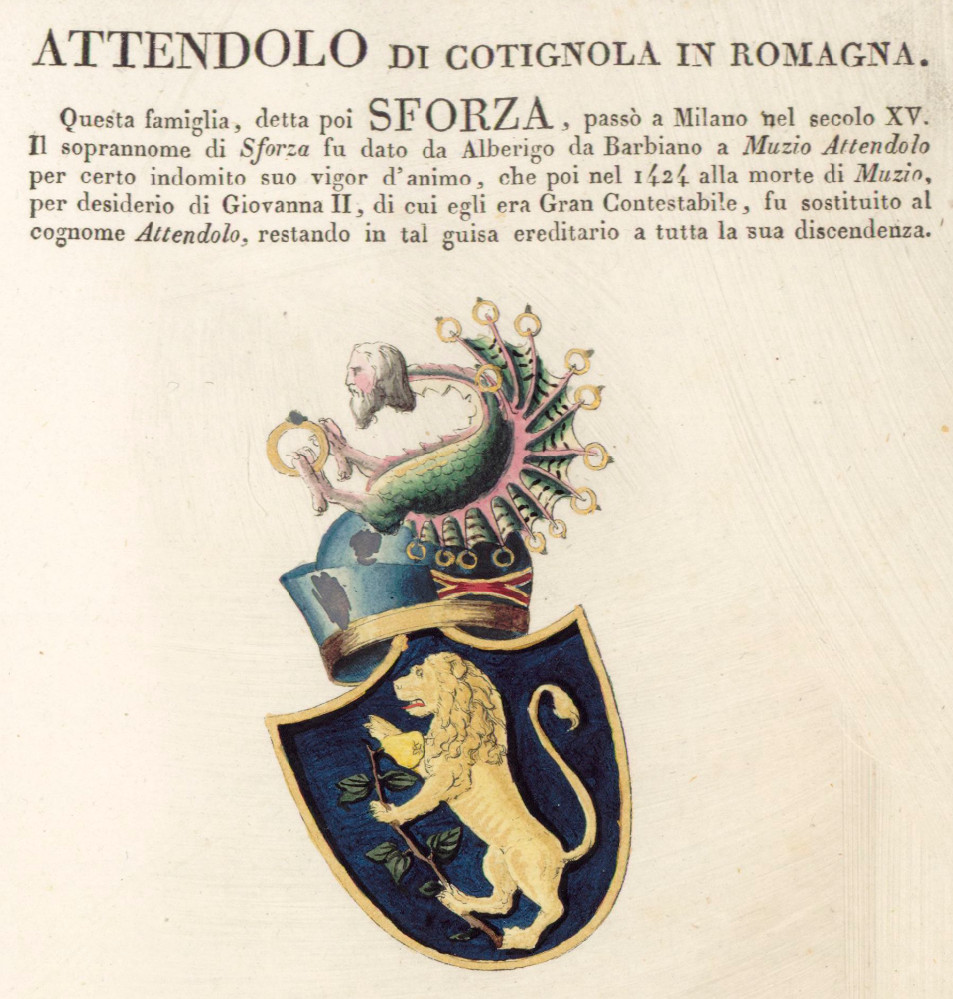
- Escutcheon of Attendolo

Personal details
- Born: 1355
- Died: 1437 (aged 81–82)
- Children: Giovanni Battista
- Parent: Nascimbene
- Relatives: Giacomo Attendolo
- Occupation: Condottiero

Military service
- Allegiance: House of Este; Duchy of Milan
- Commands: Kingdom of Naples

Lorenzo Attendolo (1355–1437) was an Italian condottiero.

Lorenzo was probably son of Nascimbene. He was the cousin of Giacomo Attendolo, and they were at the service of the House of Este. In 1412 a great fire was recorded in Cotignola which destroyed everything, with the exception of the church, the house of Sforza and the house of Lorenzo Attendolo. In 1427 was part of Duchy of Milan as a soldier and later on with Francesco Sforza. In his last military action commanded the troop of the king of Naples Alfonso V of Aragon.

Lorenzo had a son whose name was Giovanni Battista.
