= Liliana Albertini =

Italian politician (1946–2023)

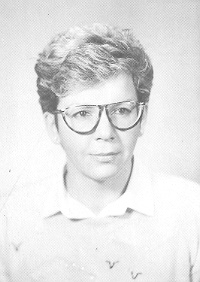
- Albertini in 1988

Member of the Chamber of Deputies of Italy
- In office 12 July 1983 – 12 June 1988

Personal details
- Born: 23 June 1946 Vignola, Italy
- Died: 14 September 2023 (aged 77)
- Party: PCI

Liliana Albertini (23 June 1946 – 14 September 2023) was an Italian politician. A member of the Italian Communist Party, she served in the Chamber of Deputies from 1983 to 1988.

Albertini died on 14 September 2023, at the age of 77.

== Biography ==
A member of the Italian Communist Party (PCI), he served two terms as mayor of the city of Vignola from 1981 to 1987.

She was elected to the Chamber of Deputies as a member of the Italian Communist Party (PCI) in 1983; she retained her seat in the Chamber even after the 1987 general election. She resigned from her position as a deputy in January 1988; her seat in the Chamber was taken by Onelio Prandini.

Meanwhile, she continued her involvement in local politics, serving as a municipal councilor in Vignola and, from 1990 to 1995, as a councilor for the Province of Modena, first for the Italian Communist Party (PCI) and then for the Democratic Party of the Left (PDS).

He also served as president of the public transportation company ATCM.
