= Cristoforo da Tolentino =

- Died: 1462
- Relatives: Niccolò da Tolentino
- Military career
- Allegiance: Italian
- Rank: Condottiero
- Conflicts: Battle of Fiordemonte

Cristoforo da Tolentino (died 1462) was an Italian condottiero, the son of Niccolò da Tolentino.

The elder of three brothers, he followed Niccolò's military career and was lord of Tolentino in 1434–1439.

Cristoforo killed Niccolò Fortebraccio at the battle of Fiordemonte. In 1438, he defended the castle of Verona for the Republic of Venice and fought at Casalmaggiore (1446).
