= Equestrian Monument of Niccolò da Tolentino =

Fresco painting by Andrea del Castagno

Coordinates: 43°46′23.1″N 11°15′22.4″E

Equestrian statue of Niccolò da Tolentino
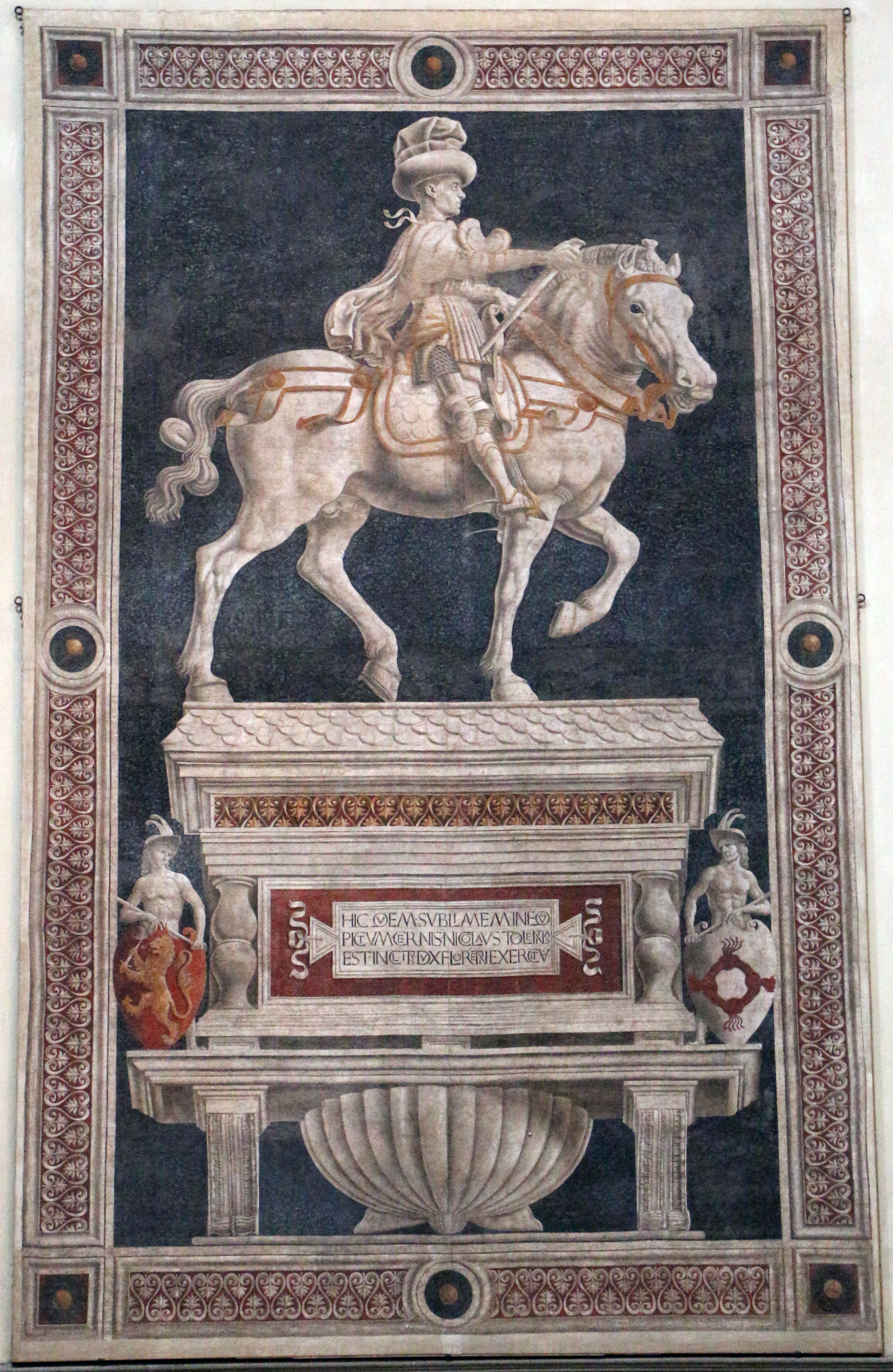
- Artist: Andrea del Castagno
- Year: 1456
- Type: Fresco
- Dimensions: 833 cm × 512 cm (328 in × 202 in)
- Location: Santa Maria del Fiore; Florence

The Equestrian Monument of Niccolò da Tolentino (1456) is a fresco painting by the early-Italian Renaissance master Andrea del Castagno, in Florence Cathedral, Italy. On the left internal wall of the church, it is next to the earlier fresco Equestrian Statue of John Hawkwood by Paolo Uccello (1436).

== Description ==
The work is a fresco painted in monochrome to emulate a marble equestrian statue. The condottiero, the Italian Niccolò da Tolentino is depicted riding his horse, standing on a classical pedestal painted in geometrical perspective, and flanked by two nude men with coat of arms. The horse and the rider are painted in a different perspective than the pedestal. The horse (differently from the species' walking pattern) is portrayed while raising both left legs. It is a large and massive animal, inspired by the head of the ancient Riccardi Horse and to Donatello's Equestrian statue of Gattamelata, a prototype of Renaissance equestrian statues. Andrea del Castagno had studied this earlier statue through drawings, never visiting its location in the city of Padua in Veneto.

As in Donatello's sculpture, the condottiero stares down the onlooker, to emphasize his power, command and determination in battle. The elegant hat and the flittering cloak area examples of the increasing taste for fine decorative elements in Florentine art, in contrast with the more austere fresco of John Hawkwood by Uccello completed some 30 years earlier.

The Latin inscriptions reads:

HIC QUEM SUBLIMEM IN EQUO PICTUM CERNIS NICOLAUS TOLENTINAS EST INCLITUS DUX FLORENTINI EXERCITUS

== Sources ==
- Paolieri, Annarita (1991). Paolo Uccello, Domenico Veneziano, Andrea del Castagno. Florence: Scala.
