= Jean-Benoît Albertini =

French civil servant (born 1963)

Prefect of Normandy
- Incumbent
- Assumed office 11 January 2023
- Preceded by: Pierre-André Durand

Personal details
- Born: 9 May 1963 (age 62)

Jean-Benoît Albertini (born 9 May 1963) is a French civil servant who has been serving as prefect of Normandy since 2023. From 2018 to 2020, he served as prefect of Essonne. From 2013 to 2017, he served as prefect of Vendée. From 2009 to 2010, he served as prefect of the Territoire de Belfort.
