= Niccolò Fortebraccio =

Italian condottiero

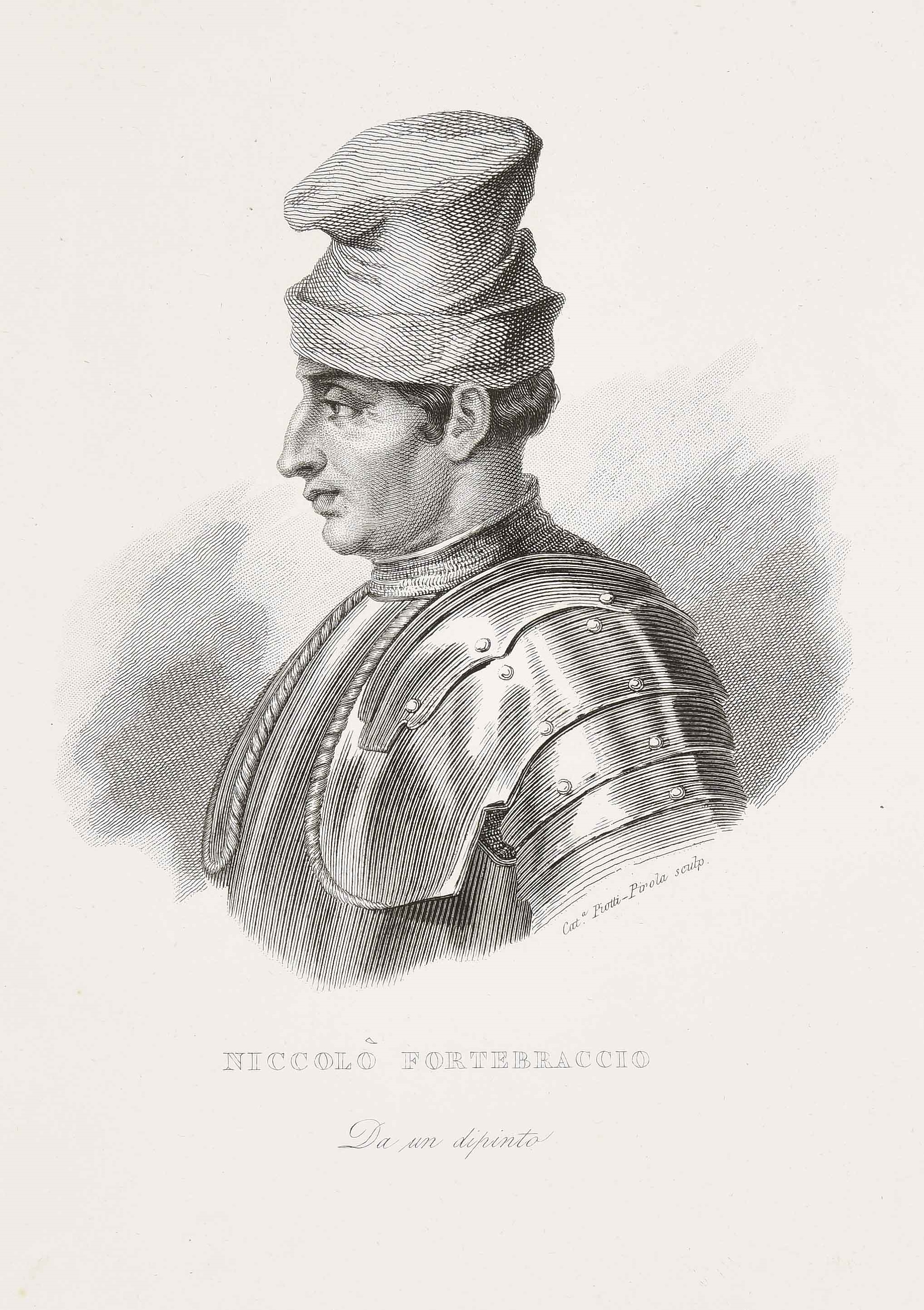
Fortebraccio in a 1837 engraving

Niccolò Fortebraccio (1375–1435), also known as Niccolò della Stella, was an Italian condottiero.

Born in Sant'Angelo in Vado, he was the son of Stella, sister of Braccio da Montone. His half-brother Oddo and his cousin Carlo were also condottieri.

In 1426 and 1429, he is mentioned at the service of the Republic of Florence. On the latter occasion he was sent against Volterra and Lucca, but, together with Guidantonio da Montefeltro, he was defeated by Niccolò Piccinino in 1430. The following year Pope Eugene IV ordered him to recapture Città di Castello, but Fortebraccio was pushed back. Despite this setback, Eugene made him gonfaloniere of the Papal Army with the task to halt emperor Sigismund's march in Tuscany and to counter the Prefetti di Vico in the Latium. However, as Fortebraccio pursued mostly his personal interests, especially regarding the possession of Città di Castello, he was fired.

Having received a condotta by the Visconti of Milan, in 1434 he moved against Rome. Giovanni Vitelleschi was sent against him, but as he was called to quench a revolt in Romagna, Fortebraccio managed to capture Tivoli. Eugene IV fled from Rome, a Republic, under the Colonna aegis, being established in the city. Considering too great for him the lordship of Rome, Fortebraccio moved away. Escaped from a plot against him, he conquered Assisi and married Ludovica da Battifolle.

After failing to adhere to the general truce which had momentarily ended the wars in Italy, a league was formed against Fortebraccio, under the capitano generale Francesco Sforza. On 15 August 1435 Niccolò defeated and took as prisoner Leone Sforza, but on the following 23 August Alessandro Sforza routed him at the siege of Fiordimonte, near Camerino. Wounded, blocked under his horse's corpse, Fortebraccio was abandoned to his agony by Sforza, until he died-killed by Cristoforo da Tolentino.

== See also ==
- Wars in Lombardy
