= Niccolò da Tolentino =

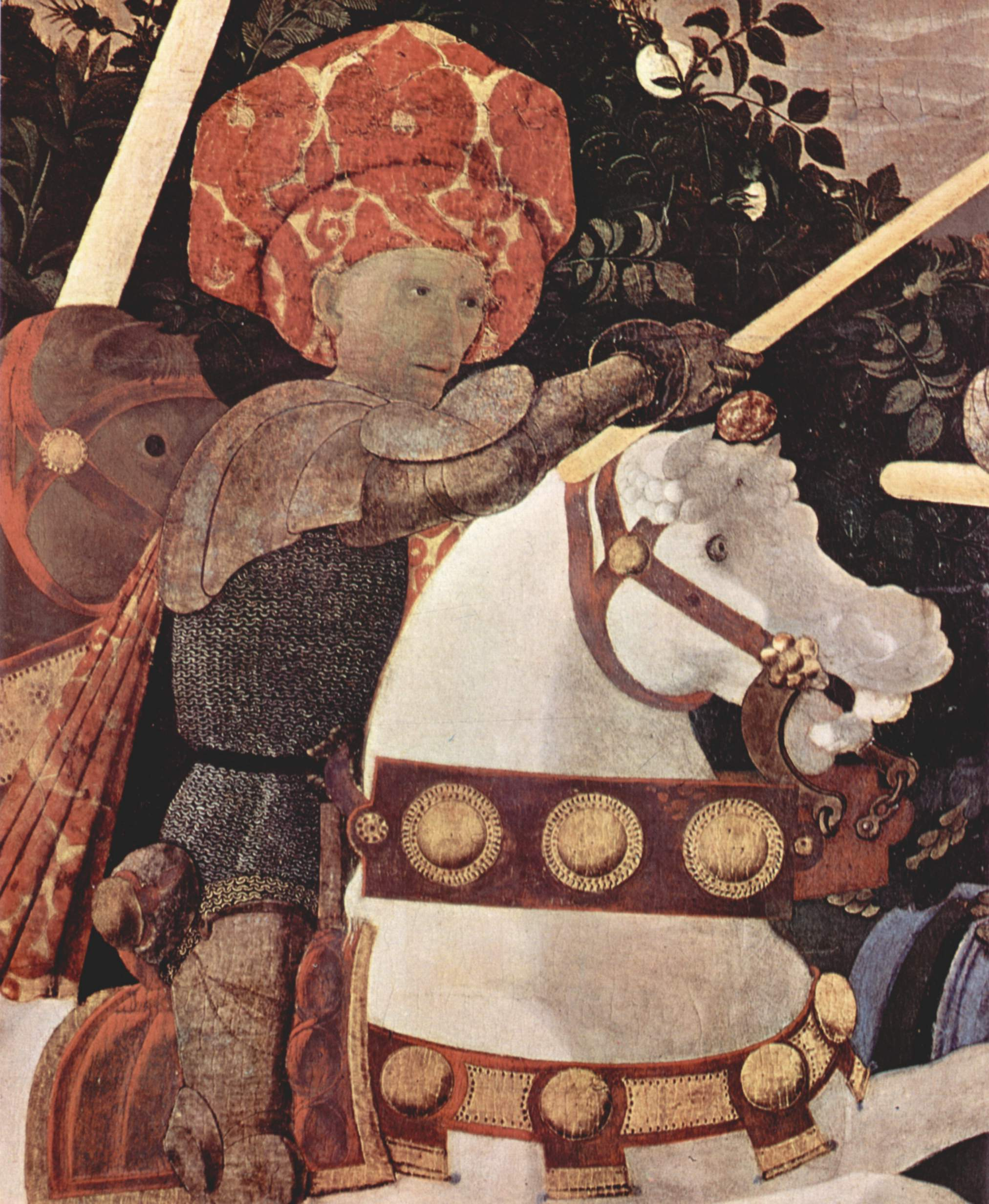
Niccolò da Tolentino portrayed in The Battle of San Romano by Paolo Uccello.

Niccolò Mauruzzi (or Mauruzi), best known as Niccolò da Tolentino (c. 1350 – 20 March 1435) was an Italian condottiero.

== Biography ==
A member of the Mauruzi della Stacciola family of Tolentino, he fled from that city in 1370 after a dispute with his relatives. He then fought under several condottieri. In 1406–1407 he commanded the troops of Gabrino Fondulo, lord of Cremona, and subsequently served under Pandolfo III Malatesta, lord of Fano and Cesena.

After obtaining the title of count and the castle of Stacciola near the Metauro river from Malatesta, he was hired by numerous Italian lords, including Filippo Maria Visconti, Queen Joan II of Naples and the Republic of Florence (1425). In 1431, he was made seignior of Borgo San Sepolcro by Papal decree, but the following year he lost it when he served under the Florentines, whose armies he led from June 1423 to May 1434, with intervals as Papal commander-in-chief in 1424 and 1428–1432, and commander of Milanese troops in 1432.

For Florence, he seized Brescia and won the Battle of Maclodio (12 October 1427). After these successes he was appointed capitano generale (commander-in-chief) of the Republic in 1431 and in 1432 he was sent as commander of coalition against Francesco I Sforza in Romagna, where he was victorious at the Battle of San Romano, and was commemorated in a painting of the battle by Paolo Uccello. A portrait of Niccolò was executed in Santa Maria Novella in memory of his deeds.

In 1434, he was captured by the Visconti and thrown into a ravine. He survived, but died of the wounds the following year at Borgo Val di Taro. He was buried in the Florence Cathedral. A celebrating fresco by Andrea del Castagno was commissioned for his tomb by the Florentine commune.

His son Cristoforo da Tolentino was also a condottiero.

== Sources ==
- Rendina, Claudio (1999). I capitani di ventura. Rome: Newton Compton.
