= Scenes from the Life of Noah =

c. 1440 paintings by Paolo Uccello

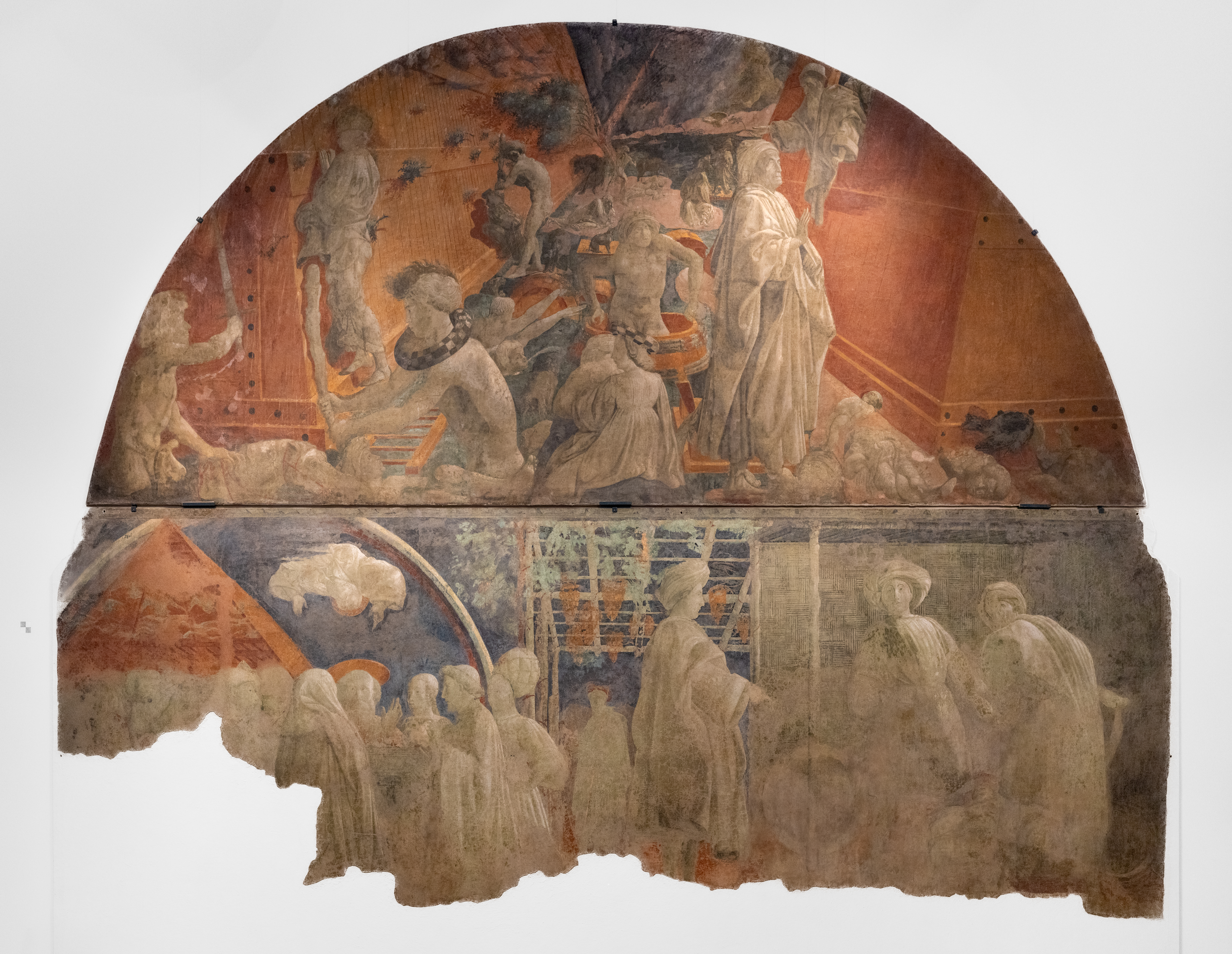
Story of Noah, c. 1447, in the refectory of Santa Maria Novella, Florence

Scenes from the Life of Noah are a pair of frescoes painted in 1436–1440 (or around 1447) by Paolo Uccello in the Chiostro Verde (Green Cloister) of Santa Maria Novella in Florence. Like the other frescoes in that cloister, they deal with stories from the Book of Genesis and are painted in monochrome tempera with terra verde as pigment, that referred to the authority of antique bronze sculpture, and gave the cloister its name.

The upper work in the semicircle of the lunette depicts The Flood and The Waters Receding (215 × 510 cm), with two symmetrical views of Noah's ark, which seem to be a single scene due to the common vanishing point in the upper center. This is one of the earliest examples of linear perspective in Renaissance art. The larger rectangular work beneath shows The Sacrifice and Drunkenness of Noah (277 × 540 cm). Ham in profile under the much admired pergola with grapes mocks his drunken father while his brothers Shem and Japheth cover Noah's naked body. In Ham Uccello presumably portrayed his colleague Dello who for some scholars participated in this work. Both frescoes have now been transferred to canvas and were restored in 2013–2014, at which time it was considered moving them to an internal room in the complex.

Several different artists worked on frescoes in the cloister between 1420 and 1440, with Uccello the earliest with his Creation and the Fall. He only returned to the cycle to produce the Noah scenes just before leaving for Venice. All the frescoes in the cloister were restored in 1859 but then damaged in the 1966 Florence flood – Uccello's works were already detached from the wall in 1909 (loosing the sinopiae underneath), and were among the first to be restored after the flood, but the others are still under restoration .^{as of when?}

The old man in The Waters Recede —probably Noah himself, who is also shown leaving the ark— blesses the land whilst looking at the bodies strewn around him. It may be possibly that in this figure someone linked to the monastery is portrayed, perhaps Cosimo the Elder or Pope Eugene IV, the former a major patron and the latter was then staying there.

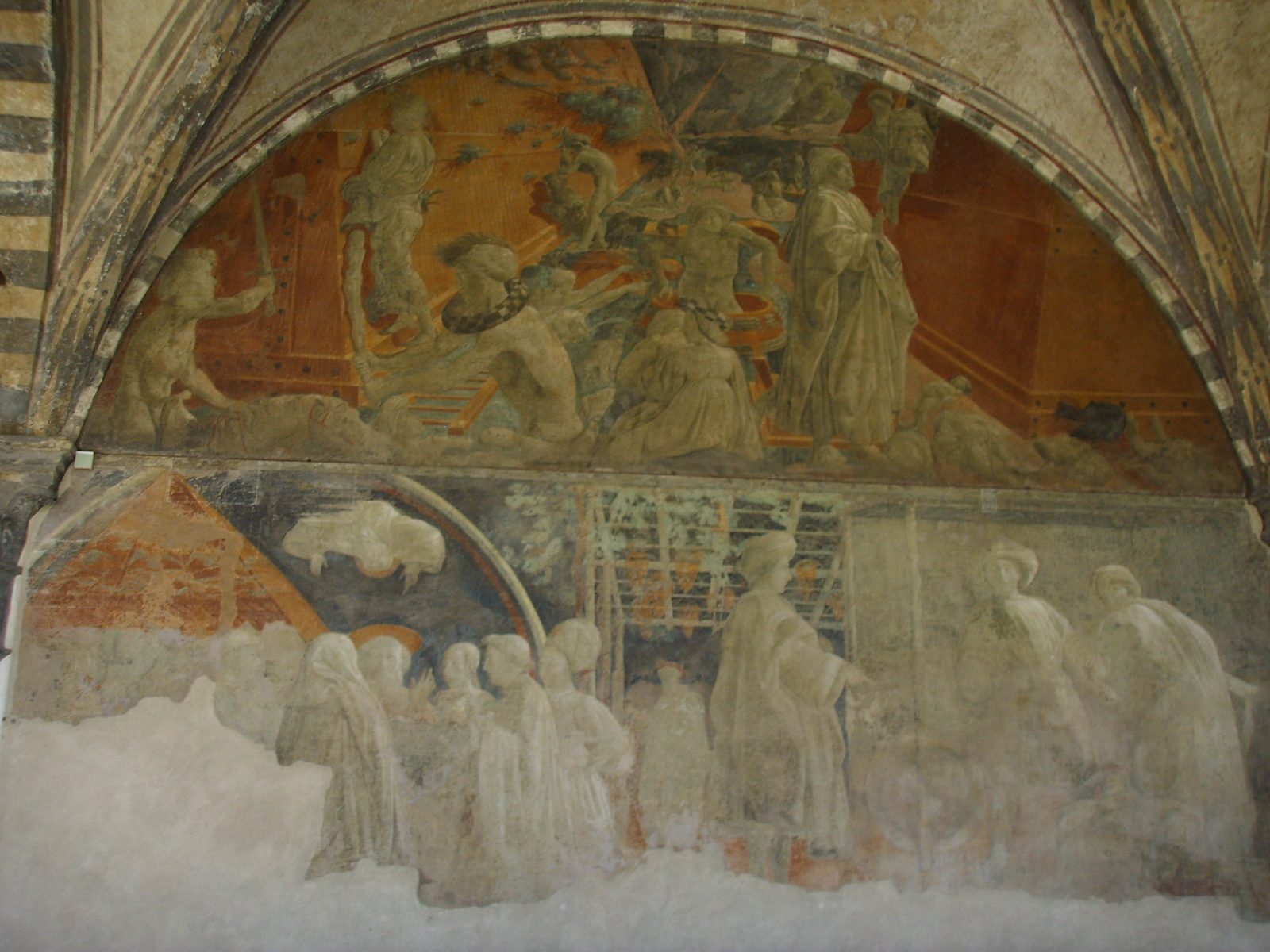
The two frescoes transferred on canvas, but still in the fourth bay of the west wall in the Chiostro Verde

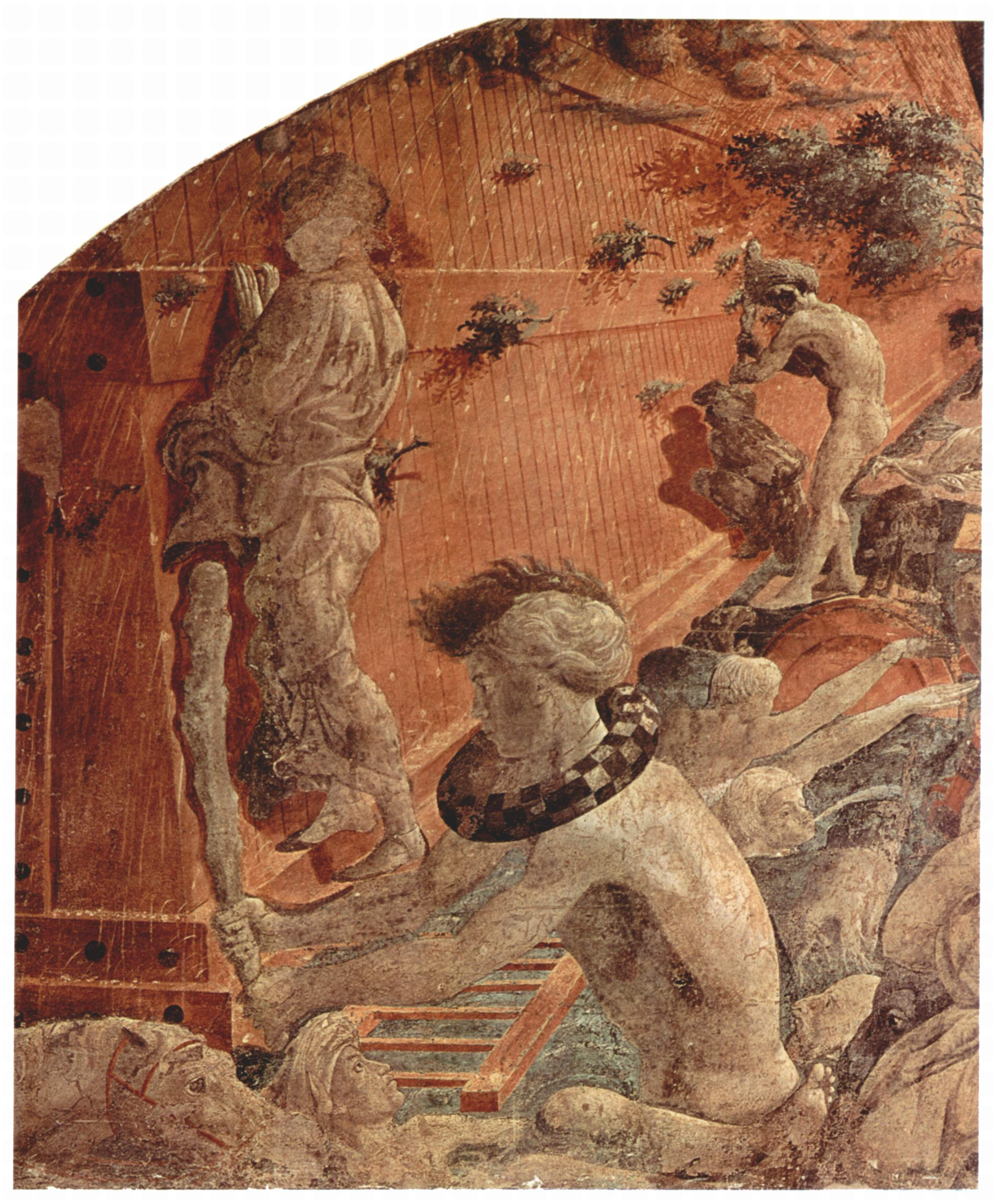
From The Flood, left side of the lunette

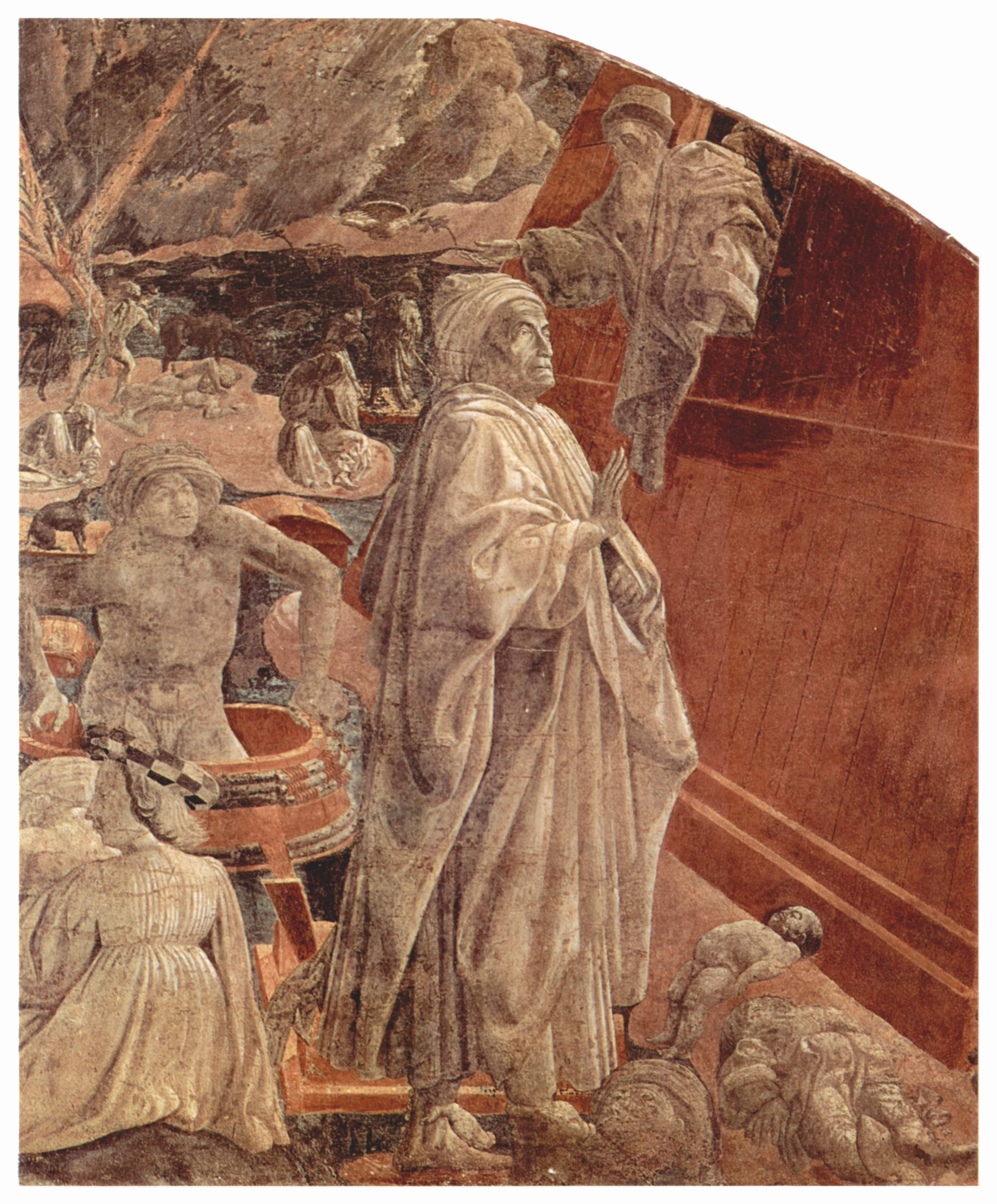
From The Waters Recede, right side of the lunette

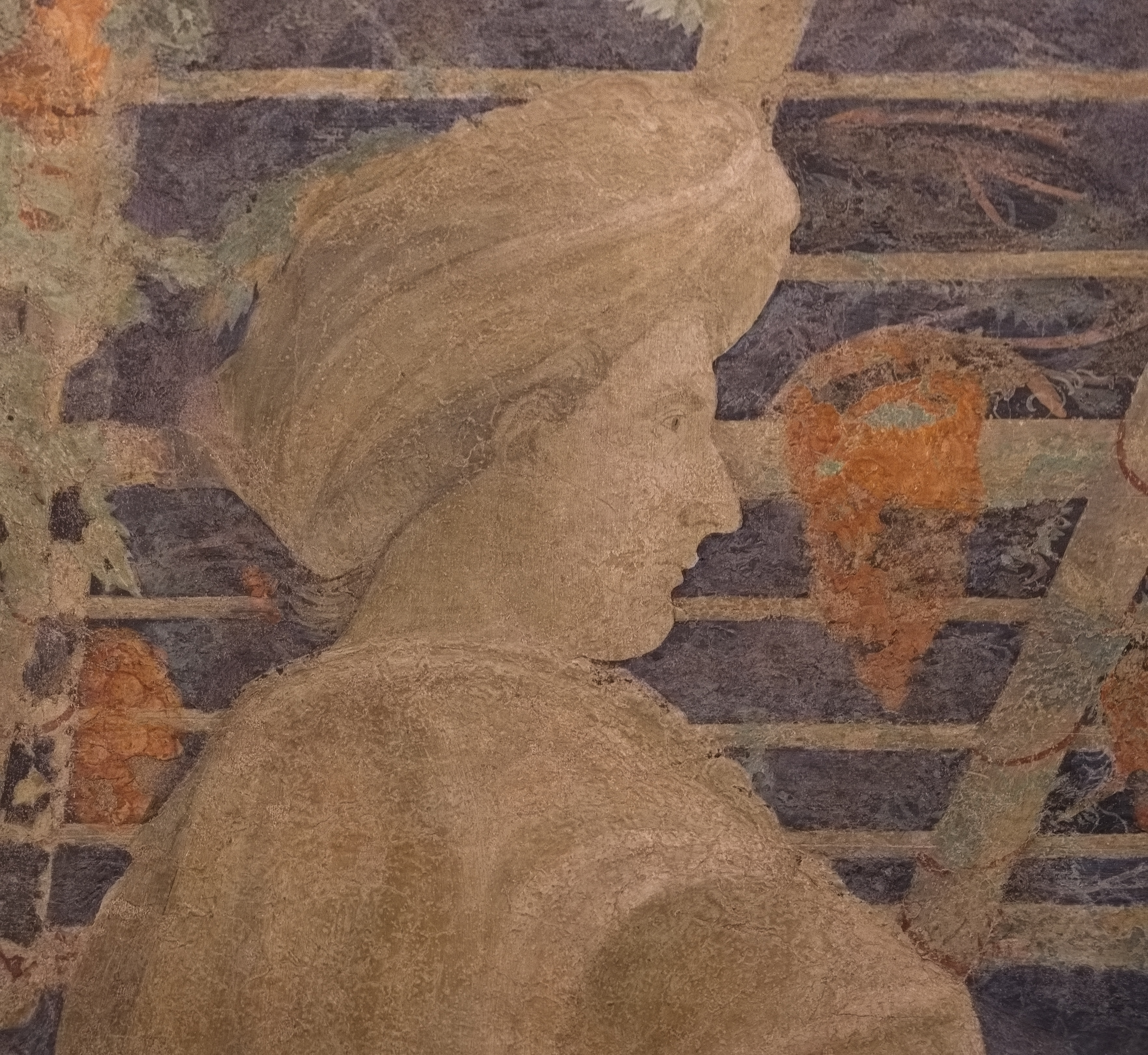
Ham in Drunkenness, whose monumentality is reminiscent of the sculptures of Donatello.

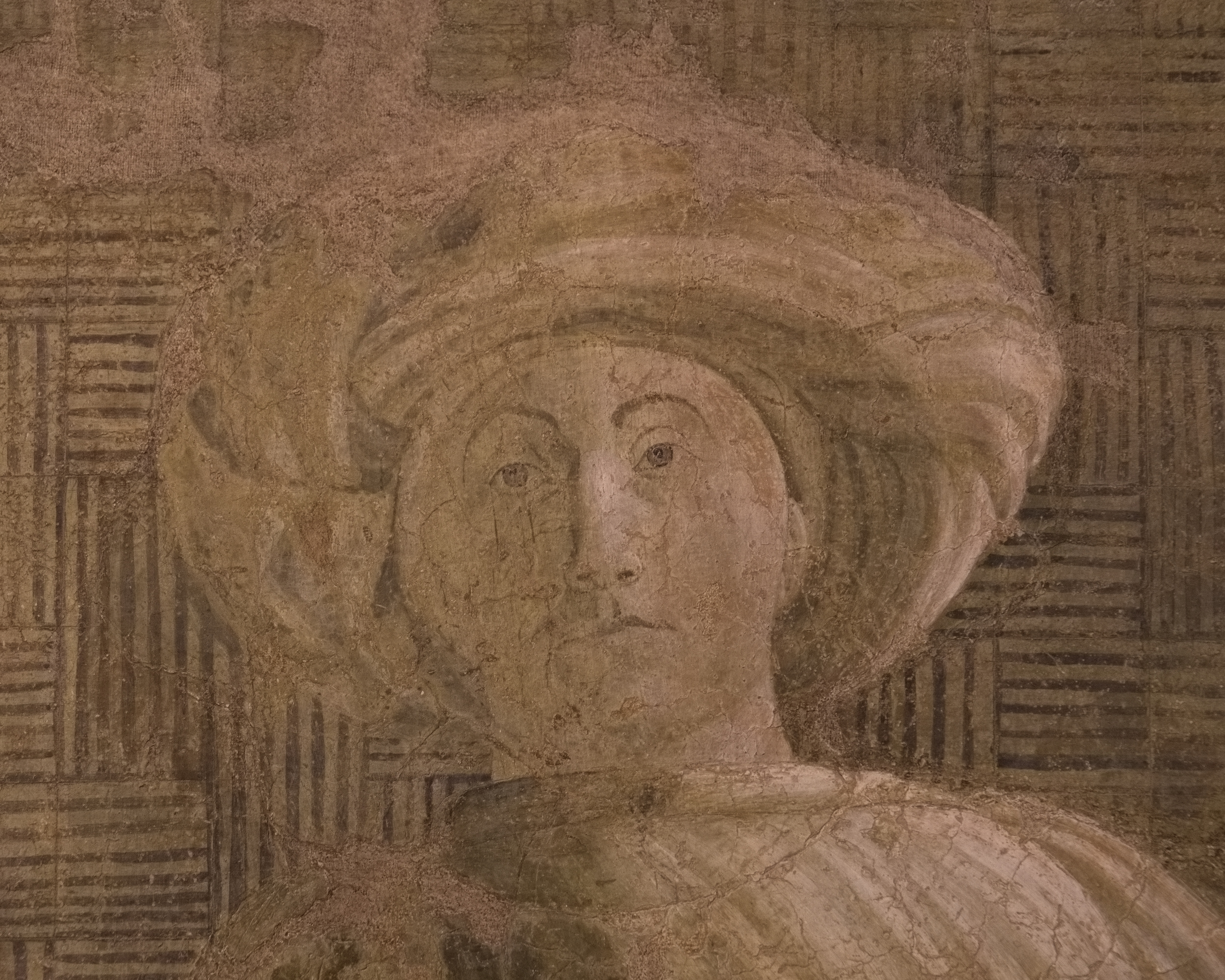
Sem

== Bibliography ==
- Giorgio Vasari, "Paolo Uccello", in Lives of the Artists, 1568 Edition, on website created by Adrienne DeAngelis, translation on the basis of Gaston C. DeVere, 1912/1915.
- Franco Borsi and Stefano Borsi, Paolo Uccello: Florenz zwischen Gotik und Renaissance, Belser, Stuttgart and Zurich 1993 (in German). English translation of the original French (1992): Thames & Hudson, London 1994.
- Annarita Paolieri, Paolo Uccello, Domenico Veneziano, Andrea del Castagno, Scala, Firenze 1991 (in Italian) ISBN 88-8117-017-5.
- Pierluigi De Vecchi and Elda Cerchiari, I tempi dell'arte, volume 2, Bompiani, Milano 1999 (in Italian) ISBN 88-451-7212-0.
- Mauro Minardi, Paolo Uccello, Rizzoli, Milano 2004 (in Italian).
