= Creation and the Fall (Uccello) =

1420–1425 frescoes by Paolo Uccello

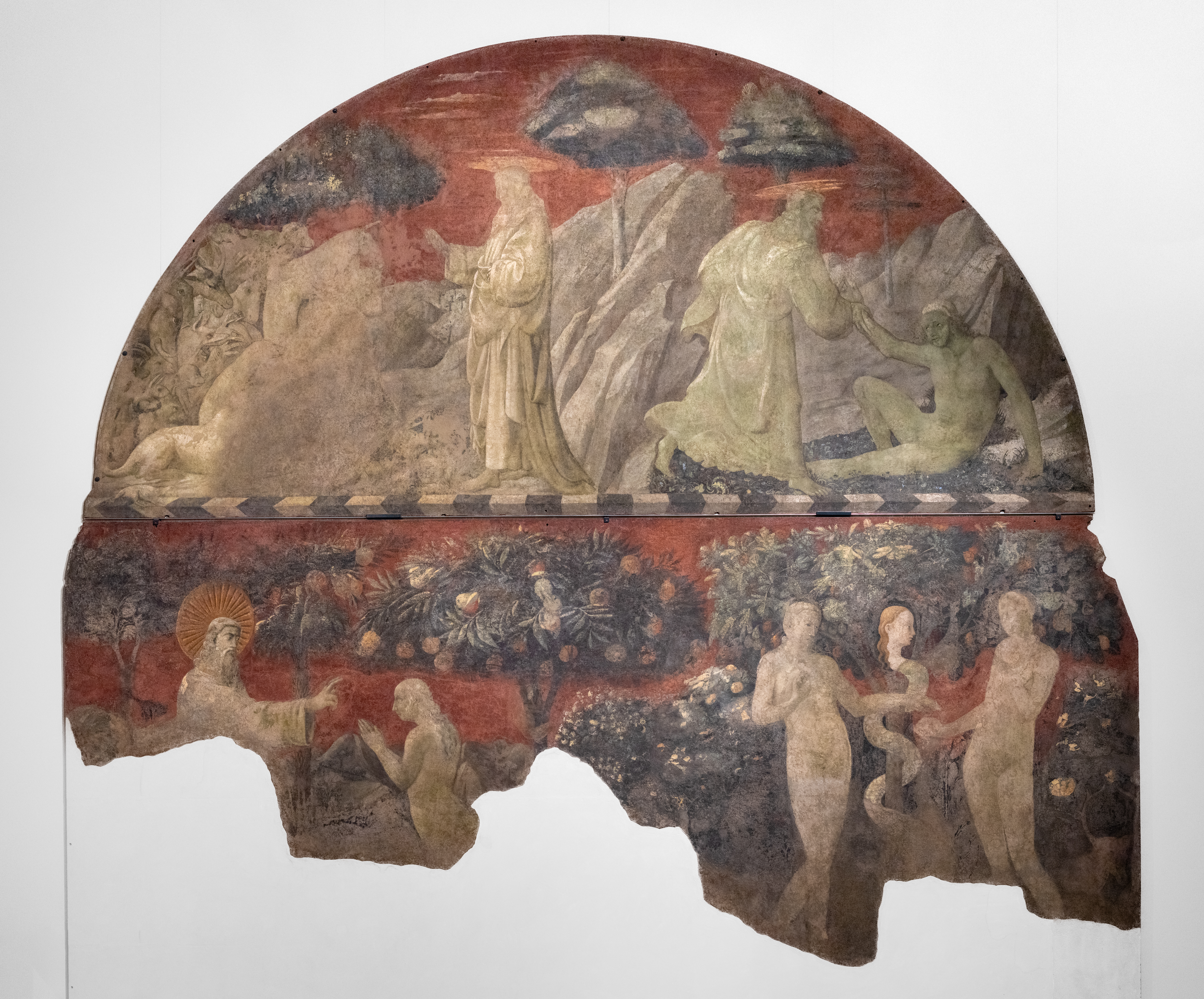
The two frescoes together

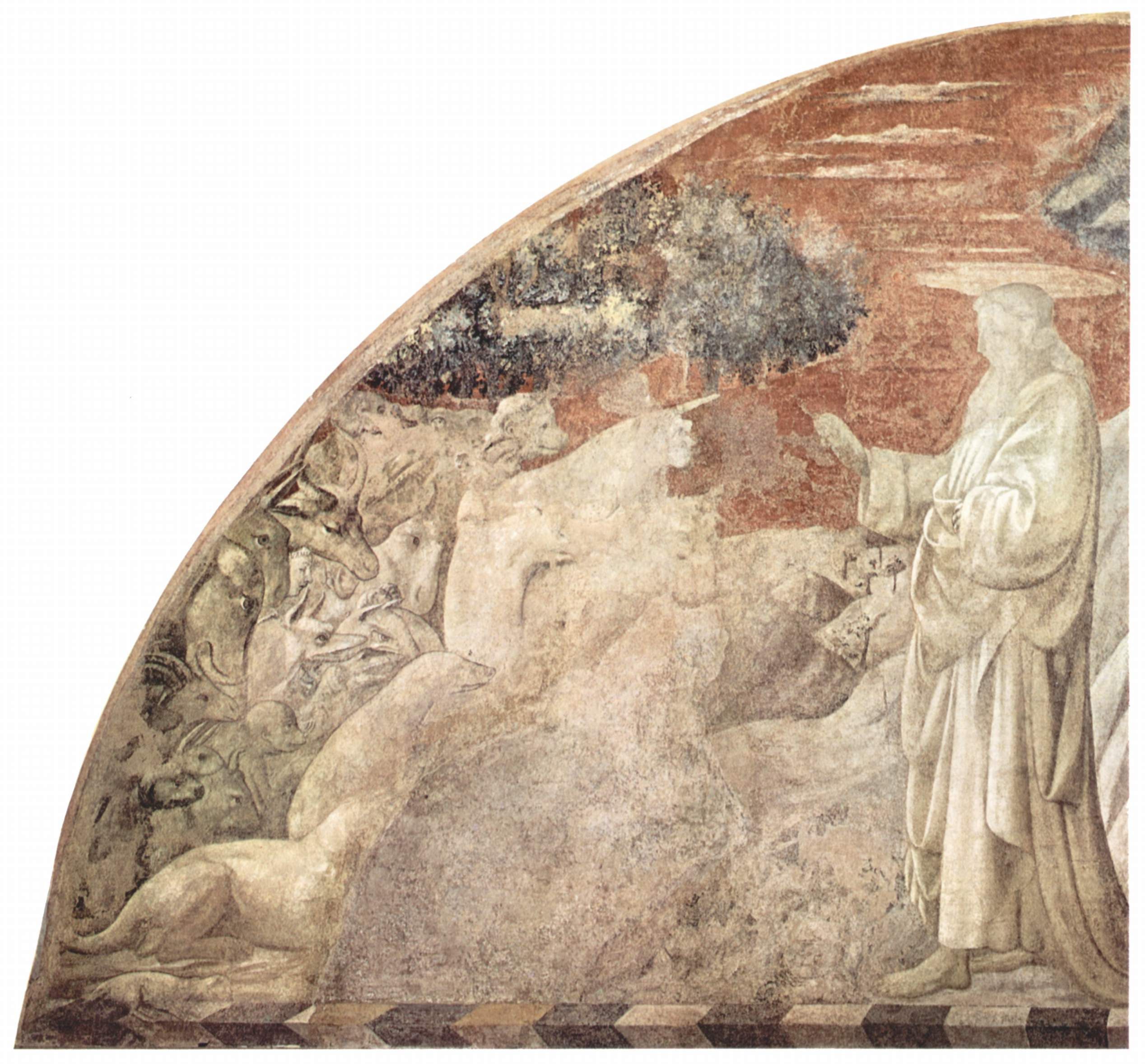
Detail from Creation

Creation and the Fall are a pair of 1420-1425 frescoes by Paolo Uccello, produced for the Chiostro Verde (Green Cloister) in Santa Maria Novella in Florence. As with the other frescoes in the cloister, it shows scenes from the Book of Genesis in monochrome, terra verde or "verdeterra" (giving the cloister its name), a pigment based on silica and iron oxide. The upper lunette shows Creation of the Animals and the Creation of Adam (244×478 cm) and the rectangular work below shows Creation of Eve and the Fall (244×278 cm). Both works have now been transferred to canvas and were restored in 2013–2014, after which it was considered moving them to an internal room within the complex.

Fall is comparable to Masolino's Temptation of Adam and Eve in the Brancacci Chapel, produced around the same time. The two frescoes were the first in a cycle in the cloister and he later followed it up with another fresco there, Scenes from the Life of Noah. All the cloister's frescoes were restored in 1859 but damaged in the 1966 Florence flood. They were all detached after the flood, their sinopia removed (and now stored by the Superintendency) and relocated in 1983, though some are still under restoration.
