= Gabriele Maria Visconti =

15th-century Lord of Pisa, Livorno, Crema, and Sarzana

- Lord of Pisa, Livorno, Crema, and Sarzana
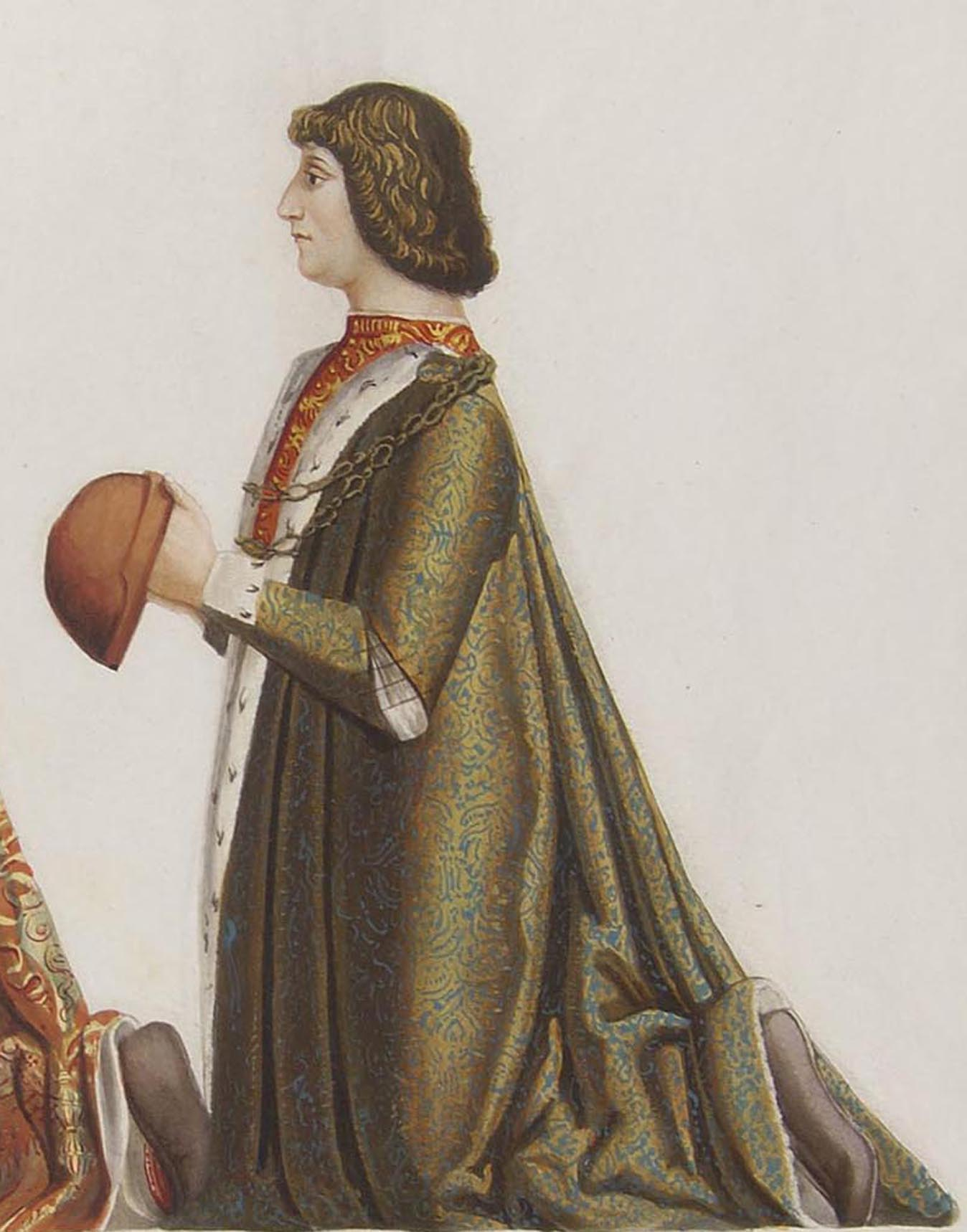
- Reign: 1402–1405
- Predecessor: Gian Galeazzo Visconti
- Successor: Republic of Florence
- Born: 1385
- Died: 15 December 1408
- House: Visconti
- Father: Gian Galeazzo Visconti
- Religion: Catholic

Gabriele Maria Visconti (1385–1408) was an illegitimate child of Gian Galeazzo Visconti, Duke of Milan, with Agnese Mantegazza. Upon his father's death in 1402, when he was sixteen years old, he inherited the signoria (lordship) of Pisa and its contado (hinterland). He also inherited the signoria of Crema and Sarzana. All these lordships were assigned to him in appanage as a vassal of his legitimate half-brother and new duke of Milan, Giovanni Maria Visconti, who was fourteen at the time and therefore under the regency of their mother Caterina Visconti.

In 1405–1406, the young Duke of Milan, Giovanni Maria, found himself in difficulty after the departure and death of his mother, so he asked for help from his half-brother Gabriele Maria. He was then entrusted with the governance of the city, but Gabriele Maria, disagreeing with Giovanni, soon abandoned Milan.

The Florentines, sworn enemies of Gian Galeazzo, immediately after his death sent their armies against the territories of Pisa and Siena, but these armies, engaged only in raiding the countryside, could not prevent the young Gabriele Maria from descending into Tuscany, entering Pisa, and officially taking possession of it. Meanwhile, the Visconti domains were crumbling under the ambitions of various powers and local lords, who took over the different cities that had escaped the governance of Duchess Caterina. Among these was Crema, Gabriele Maria's personal appanage, which the Benzoni family took over in 1403.

Meanwhile, the Florentines maintained their ambitions over Pisa and sought to exploit the discontent caused in the population by Gabriele Maria who, after imposing new taxes, had sent some wealthy citizens to death to seize their assets, after accusing them of conspiring against him. In January 1404, Florence therefore sent against Pisa a body of cavalry and some companies of infantry, but this small army found the city well defended and therefore had to retreat.

Gabriele Maria Visconti, fearing that the Florentines would return with greater forces, asked for help from the French. At that time in Italy was the famous Jean II Le Maingre, known as Boucicaut, who governed the Republic of Genoa for the King of France. Visconti obtained the hoped-for help by declaring himself a vassal of the King of France and promising the annual tribute of a horse and a falcon. After this act, Boucicaut ordered the Florentines to withdraw any threat on Pisa and, having the order had no effect, imprisoned all the Florentine merchants who were in Genoa, also seizing all their goods. Florence did not wish to attract the wrath of the king of France, so it concluded with the governor of Genoa and with Gabriele Maria himself a four-year truce, which provided for the cession of Livorno to Florence, against a large compensation, therefore the Florentines turned to punish the Tuscan feudatories who, during the war against Gian Galeazzo, had sided with the latter.

However, Florence continued to want possession of Pisa. The Florentines, while keeping faith with the truce agreements, fueled the difficulties in which Boucicaut, hated by the Genoese for his exorbitant governance, was struggling, hoping to profit from it. For his part, Boucicaut, not feeling too secure in Genoa and wishing to obtain the alliance of Florence, induced Gabriele Maria Visconti to negotiate with his mediation with the Florentines, to sell them Pisa itself. Therefore, soon after, the so-called "market of Pisa" opened, according to an expression of the time. The negotiations were secretly started in Genoa and continued in Vico Pisano. Having heard of it, the Pisans took up arms against their lord and forced him to take refuge in the city fortress (21 July 1405). Despite this, Visconti continued the negotiations and agreed with Florence on the cession of the fortresses and castles in his power, also selling all his rights as lord of Pisa, reserving only the possession of Sarzana and other lands in Lunigiana.

In the meantime, Boucicaut intervened, arriving in Pisa with two galleys and three hundred men; it is unclear whether due to a misunderstanding or an ambush, one of the ships was boarded as soon as it entered the Arno River, and the crew was taken prisoner. Boucicaut then withdrew, not wishing to unleash a large-scale war, for which he probably could not have counted on the help of France. Florence thus acquired the lordship of Pisa from Gabriele Maria (who had meanwhile retired to Sarzana) for 200,000 gold florins (of which three-fifths went to Boucicaut, the rest to Visconti); acquiring the city, with its port, Florence had its own access to the sea, thus being able to compete with Genoa, but the passage to Florence was not well received in Pisa, where another insurrection broke out, to which the Florentines responded by laying siege, which ended with the conquest of the exhausted city.

In the following years, a heterogeneous coalition formed against French interests in Italy: the Visconti of Milan, the Malaspina of Lunigiana, Theodore II, Marquess of Montferrat, and the Ghibelline exiles of Genoa, well represented even within the city walls by numerous personalities and power groups. Initially, Boucicaut was able to react vehemently to the threat, acting with fierce determination internally, and externally waging war on the Malaspina; Gabriele Maria Visconti himself, indicated in correspondence as one of the leaders of the plot, was lured into a trap by Boucicaut, with the promise of settling his compensations on the sale of Pisa and Livorno; he was then imprisoned by him on charges of treason and shortly thereafter put to death by decapitation in 1408.

== Descendants ==
- Jacopo Visconti (ca. 1405 - post 1446), natural child and legitimized by his uncle Filippo Maria, Duke of Milan in 1429, invested with Tortona and Valenza in 1429; he married Caterina Rossi of the Counts of San Secondo.
