= Beatrice Lascaris di Tenda =

Italian noblewoman (c. 1372–1418)

Beatrice Cane
- Countess of Biandrate; Duchess of Milan
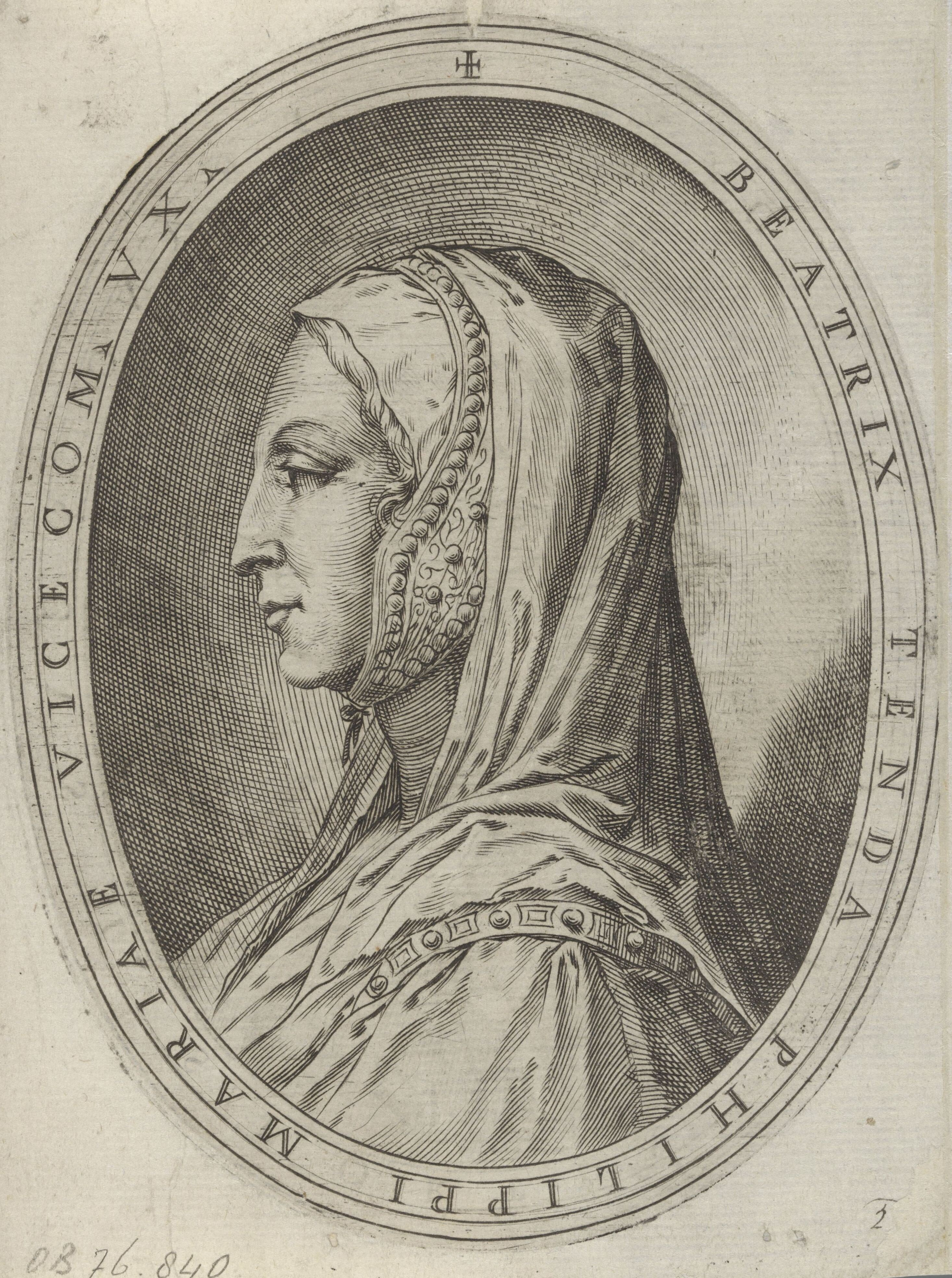
- Born: c. 1372
- Died: 13 September 1418 (aged 45–46)
- Noble family: Cane
- Spouses: Facino Cane of Biandrate; Filippo Maria Visconti
- Father: Ruggero Cane
- Mother: Giacobina Asinari

Beatrice Cane (c. 1372 – 1418), mistakenly known in much of the historiography as Beatrice Lascaris di Tenda but actually a member of the Cane family, was an Italian noblewoman who married first the condottiero Facino Cane, Count of Biandrate and a cousin once removed, and then Filippo Maria Visconti, Duke of Milan, who later had her killed.

== Origins ==
Beatrice was born at an uncertain date probably in the 1370s (suggested dates include 1370 or 1372). Referred to simply as Beatrice in most sources from her time and shortly after, she was first identified as "Beatrice Tenda" by Bernardino Corio in his Milanese history first published in 1503. She was accordingly long considered a member of the Lascaris di Ventimiglia family of the Counts of Tenda. Historians hypothesized that she was the daughter of Count Antonio of Tenda by Margherita del Carretto of Finale, or of Count Guglielmo Pietro of Tenda, or of Count Pietro Balbo II of Tenda, (Note: Hypotheses summarized in Dizionario biografico) and even suggested identifying her with Pietro Balbo's daughter Caterina, who married on 5 September 1403, supposedly changing her name to Beatrice since her husband hated the name Caterina. However, relatively recently analyzed primary documents have revealed that Beatrice was actually the daughter of Ruggero Cane, a captain in the service of Bernabò and Gian Galeazzo Visconti of Milan, and a cousin of her first husband, Facino Cane. Her mother was Giacobina Asinari.

== First marriage ==
In the mid-1390s, (Note: The oft-cited date 1403 is based on the erroneous identification of Beatrice with Caterina Lascaris of Tenda.) she married Facino Cane of Montferrat, her cousin once removed who was a military commander, and condottiero, usually in the service of the Visconti of Milan. He reputedly treated her with great consideration and respect and divided his honours and treasures with her. She is said to have accompanied him in battle.

Facino Cane died in Pavia on 16 May 1412, the very day of the assassination of Giovanni Maria Visconti, the second duke of Milan. Cane's death left Beatrice a very rich widow. She had four hundred thousand ducats, the domain of those towns and lands that were in her dead husband's control, and many men-at-arms.

== Second marriage ==
Filippo Maria Visconti succeeded his murdered brother in the Duchy of Milan. Some of his council advised him to marry Beatrice, whose worth exceeded his own personal fortune and territorial control, despite that she was twenty years his elder. Once he obtained his new wife's resources, he easily conquered the various rulers of the smaller neighboring domains. Building on the Facino's foundation, he reconstructed a state that began to compare of that of his father, Gian Galeazzo Visconti, before it fell apart under his brother Giovanni's rule.

However, despite the wealth, territory, and military strength that she had brought to him, Filippo grew averse to Beatrice, perhaps because of jealousy of her late husband's reputation, or her own political power, or her greater age, or that she bore no children, or his favoring of his mistress, the much younger Agnese del Maino.

== Torture and execution ==
Unable to denounce his wife publicly, he effected a scheme common among the nobility of the time, that of adultery. Among those of the Duchess Beatrice's household was a young troubadour and friend, Michele Orombelli, who often entertained the lady with lute and song. To avoid any possibility of an uprising that might try to free the popular Duchess, on 23 August 1418 he had the doors of Milan closed until lunchtime, and had the troubadour, the Duchess, and two of her handmaidens spirited away to the castle of Binasco. In its confines, the captors tortured the prisoners. The handmaidens confessed to having seen the duchess with Orombelli sitting on the bed playing the lute. The torturers forced Orombelli into confession of adultery. Although Beatrice herself received twenty-four lashes, she denied any guilt to her confessor. A jurist, Gasparino de' Grassi Castiglione, proclaimed Beatrice, the troubadour, and the handmaidens all guilty of adultery or its complicity, and sentenced them to death. Her captors beheaded Beatrice in the courtyard on 13 September 1418, accompanied in death by her two maids and the young troubadour.

== Literary and historical accounts ==
According to many accounts, Beatrice appears as an intelligent woman who concerned herself in the current affairs of state. Her reputation for honesty and modesty made her a martyr in the eyes of many. Her story inspired many writers. A book written by Carlo Tedaldi-Fores inspired Vincenzo Bellini to write a two-act opera, Beatrice di Tenda, first performed on 16 March 1833 at the La Fenice in Venice. Sarah Josepha Hale included a laudatory article about her in her encyclopedic Woman's record; or, Sketches of all distinguished women from the creation to A.D. 1854. She also appears as a minor character in Bellarion by Raphael Sabatini.

In their revision of Bernardino Corio's history of Milan, Angelo Butti and Luigi Ferrario noted that contemporaries had differing opinions of Beatrice Lascaris di Tenda. They wrote that Rainaldi and Fleury claimed that Beatrice plotted against her Visconti husband in conducting secret correspondence with the Bishop of Passau and the Earl of Oettingen, and that they sent ambassadors to the Emperor Sigismund. They noted that Pietro Candido Decembrio, secretary to Filippo Maria Visconti, openly condemned her petulant and greedy nature. Butti and Ferrario also wrote that Andrea Biglia, an Augustinian friar and Italian humanist, chronicled that Beatrice was already advanced in years, and could no longer attract her husband, nor offer the hope of children.

== Notes ==
Preceded by Antonia Malatesta	Duchess of Milan; 1412–1418	Succeeded by Marie of Savoy
