= Antonia Malatesta of Cesena =

Duchess of Milan

Antonia Malatesta of Cesena, also known as Antonia Malatesta of Rimini, was Duchess of Milan by marriage to Giovanni Maria Visconti. She was the Regent of Milan in the interim after the death of her spouse in 1412.

== Life ==
Antonia Malatesta was born in January 1394 in Cesena and was the daughter of the condottiero Andrea Malatesta and Ricciarda (or Rengarda) Alidosi and the niece of Carlo I Malatesta, Lord of Cesena, Fano, Pesaro, and Rimini. Her paternal grandparents were Gaelotto Malatesta and Elisabetta da Varano, while her maternal grandparents were Bertrando Alidosi and Elisa Tarlati.

Antonia's mother, Rengarda, died very young in 1401, allegedly repudiated by her husband Malatesta and then poisoned by her brothers on suspicion of adultery. Antonia's father would marry twice more. Antonia's stepmother, Lucrezia Ordelaffi, was also said to have been poisoned just days after giving birth to Antonia's half-sister Parisina.

=== Marriage ===
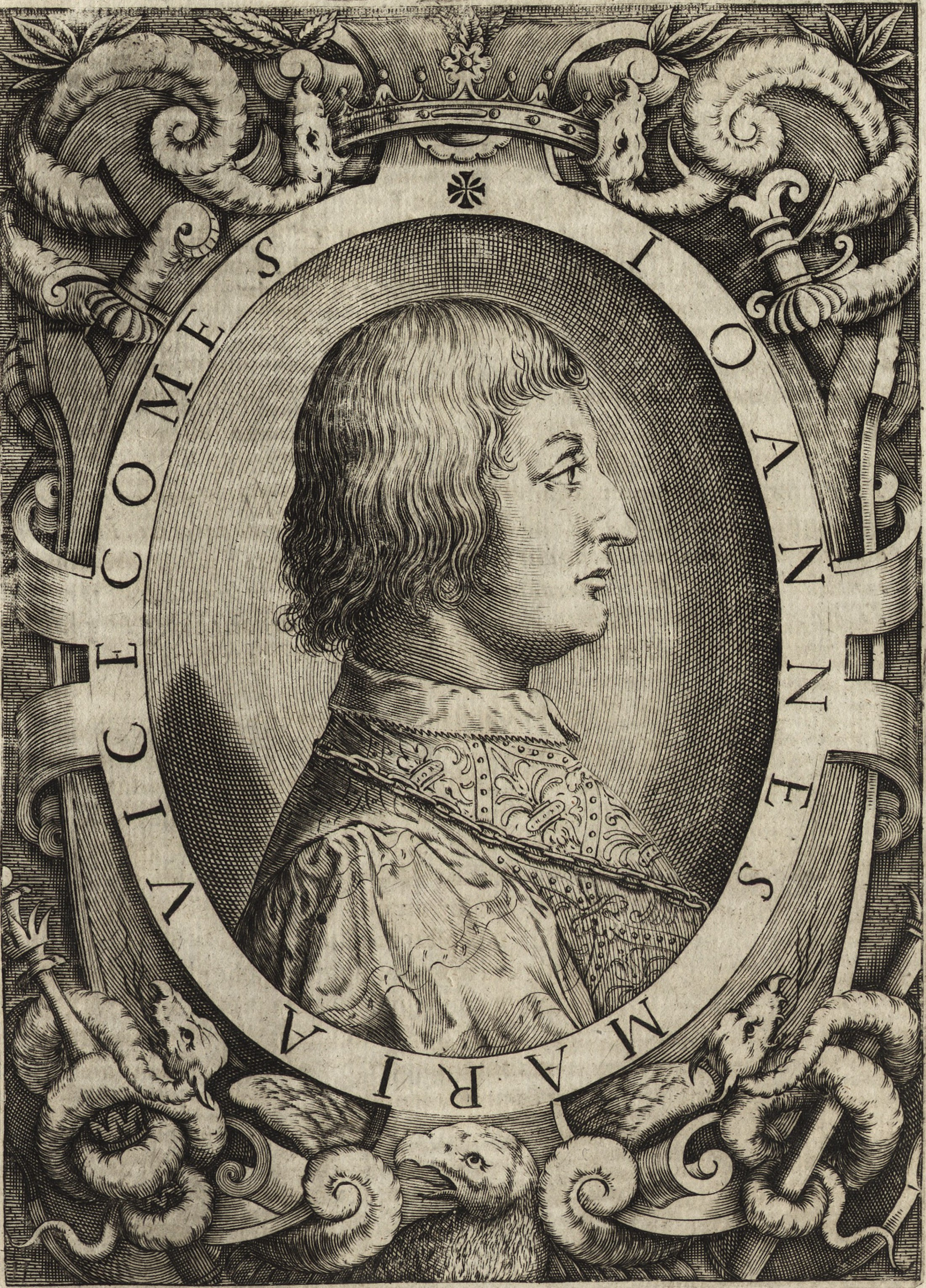
Gian Maria Visconti

The Malatesta family wished to ally themselves with the powerful Visconti family and persuaded with the young Duke of Milan Giovanni Maria Visconti, the Duke of Milan to marry Antonia Malaesta.married Antonia in the city of Brescia in 1408. They had no children.

In 1410, Antonia sheltered Beatrice di Tenda after her husband Facino Cane had been driven from Milan due the persecutions of Antonia's husband.

==== Husband's assassination ====
On May 16, 1412, while Giovanni Maria was on his way to the church of San Gottardo, a large group of conspirators, among whom belonged to the major Milanese noble families, stabbed him to death.

After Giovanni Maria's assassination in 1412, the succeeding Duke of Milan, Filippo Maria Visconti, permitted Antonia to continue sharing the governance of the duchy for a few months. Although she soon retired to Cesena, she retained her title, Duchess of Milan.

=== Death ===
The date of her death is unknown.

== In art ==
- A portrait of Antonia at the Certosa (a Carthusian monastery, north of Pavia) and a portrait of her husband

== In literature ==
- Sabatini, Raphael (1926). Bellarion the fortunate: a romance. Boston: Houghton Mifflin. OCLC 1170948.

== Notes ==
1. In the case of Antonias mother Rengarda these allegations seems have to be made much later. The Italian librarian and bibliographer Romeo Gallo examines these claims in Atti e memorie (1922) and finds severally disrepancies.

Preceded by Caterina Visconti	Duchess of Milan; 1408–1412	Succeeded by Beatrice Lascaris di Tenda
