= Bellarion the Fortunate =

1926 historical novel by Rafael Sabatini

- First edition (UK)
- Author: Rafael Sabatini
- Language: English
- Genre: Historical romance
- Publisher: Hutchinson (UK); Houghton Mifflin (US)
- Publication date: 1926
- Publication place: United Kingdom / United States
- Media type: Print (Hardback and Paperback)
- Pages: 268 (first edition, hardback)

Bellarion the Fortunate, published in 1926, is an historical novel by Rafael Sabatini. Set at the beginning of the 15th century in Northern Italy, it takes place first in the Marquessate of Montferrat and later in the Duchy of Milan. Most of its characters, including Gian Galeazzo Visconti, Gian Maria Visconti, Facino Cane, Filippo Maria Visconti, and Francesco Bussone da Carmagnola, were real historical figures; the scheming title character is the notable exception.

In the novel, Bellarion was abandoned as a child and was raised in an abbey. As a young man, he leaves to study in the University of Pavia. He briefly travels with a Franciscan friar, but then discovers that the friar is a criminal in disguise. The authorities in Montferrat assume that Bellarion is an accomplice of his traveling companion, while Princess Valeria of Montferrat mistakes him for an expected messenger from one of her contacts. Bellarion offers to serve as her own messenger. He soon becomes involved in a plot to assassinate Valeria's uncle, the acting regent Theodore Palaeologus, and he personally murders a double agent among the conspirators. To avoid murder charges, Bellarion pretends to be an adoptive son of the Milanese condottiere Facino Cane. For his own reasons, Cane formalizes the adoption. Bellarion proceeds to become an important mercenary captain in his own right. He continues to serve Valeria throughout his career.

== Plot summary ==
The narrative is presented as the author's compilation of histories of Bellarion's life, in particular that of one Fra Serafino of Imola. Bellarion, abandoned as a child and raised in an abbey, departs as a young man with a letter of introduction from the respected abbot, intending to study in the University of Pavia. He meets and travels with a Franciscan friar, but discovers that someone has robbed him of his money and letter. Upon arriving in Casale, the capital of Montferrat, he finds himself pursued by the authorities, who suspect him of complicity with the false friar, actually a well-known scoundrel named Lorenzaccio da Trino. He flees until he reaches a palace and enters by a garden door which he is surprised to find unlocked. A beautiful lady admits him, bolts the door, and takes pains to hide him from his pursuers. They arrive, and Bellarion listens to her rebuff them, discovering that she is the Princess Valeria of Montferrat.

When the Guard depart, Valeria quizzes Bellarion, mistaking him for a messenger she had been expecting, asking after Giufreddo and Lord Barbaresco. He corrects her misapprehension, but, sensing an intrigue and anxious to impress her, offers in return for her kindness to carry a message to Lord Barbaresco. She distrusts him, but charges him simply to ask what has become of Giufreddo, who Bellarion assumes is the previous messenger, and how Barbaresco's plan is progressing.

He discovers that Barbaresco and a group of friends, including Valeria's trusted confidante Enzo Spigno, are plotting the murder of Theodore, Valeria's uncle, who is serving Regent of Montferrat until Valeria's brother, the rightful Marquis, reaches majority. Theodore is plotting to keep the throne for himself, and is doing so by corrupting his nephew and rendering him unable to rule. Bellarion continues to investigate the matter, despite Valeria's wishing that he would leave her alone; he discovers that Spigno is a traitor to the group and is in the employ of Theodore, and consequently stabs him. As he escapes, the Guard captures him, and its captain recognizes him as the same companion of da Trino who had escaped a week before. He goes before the local high court, over which the Podestà presides, for the murder of Spigno. He tells the court that Spigno was murdered in a fight in the house at which Bellarion was not present, and claims to be the adoptive son of Facino Cane, a condottiere in Milan, as a delaying tactic.

The Podestà holds the case for the time being, intending to contact Facino to verify whether Bellarion is truly his adoptive son; meanwhile, Theodore enters his prison cell, believing that he was a traitor to Valeria and loyal to himself, and affords him means to escape, unaware that he did in fact murder Spigno. Bellarion travels thence to Milan.

Upon nearing Milan, he is attacked by dogs commanded by Gian Maria Visconti, the despotic and cruel Duke of Milan and the son of Gian Galeazzo Visconti. He kills one, becoming soaked in dog's blood, and the rest become pacified, unwilling to attack someone who smells like one of them. Gian Maria believes this is some manner of witchcraft and takes Bellarion to Milan to interrogate him, whereupon Facino Cane, who has heard that his supposed adoptive son has arrived, takes possession of him. Bellarion explains his past to Facino, who thinks it highly amusing, and shortly sets about formalizing the adoption.

The story continues to follow the career of Bellarion, who becomes a true and loyal son to Facino Cane, then pledges loyalty to Cane's widow after Facino dies. There are numerous twists and turns to the plot as Bellarion rises in rank to become an important mercenary captain. He serves Valeria in many ways, and that story takes over the plot.
