= List of Milanese consorts =

== Lady of Milan ==
=== Early consorts ===
The name wives and consorts of the early Della Torre lords of Milan are not known. But Napoleone della Torre may have been married to a Margherita di Baux.

=== House of Visconti, 1277–1302 ===
Picture	Name	Father	Birth	Marriage	Became Consort	Ceased to be Consort	Death	Spouse
	Bonacossa Borri	Squarcina Borri (Borri)	1254	1269	1294 husband's accession	1302 husband's exile	15 January 1321	Matteo I Visconti

=== House of della Torre, 1302–1311 ===
Picture	Name	Father	Birth	Marriage	Became Consort	Ceased to be Consort	Death	Spouse
	Beatrice Guidi di Batifolle	Simon Guidi, Count of Batifolle (Guidi)	-	May 1276	1302 husband's accession	1302 her death	-	Guido della Torre
	Brunissenda Langosco di Lomello	Filippo di Langosco, Count Palatine of Lomello (Lomello)	-	1302	1302 husband's accession	1311 husband's expulsion by the Emperor	-	Guido della Torre

=== House of Visconti, 1311–1395 ===
Picture	Name	Father	Birth	Marriage	Became Consort	Ceased to be Consort	Death	Spouse
	Bonacossa Borri	Squarcina Borri (Borri)	1254	1269	1311 husband's restoration	15 January 1321		Matteo I Visconti
	Beatrice d'Este	Obizzo II d'Este (Este)	1267	24 June 1300	28 June 1322 husband's accession	5 July 1327 husband's desposition	1/15 September 1334/37	Galeazzo I Visconti
	Catherine of Savoy-Vaud	Louis II, Baron de Vaud (Savoy)	-	1/10 October 1330		16 August 1339 husband's death	18 January 1388	Azzone Visconti
	Isabella Fieschi	Carlo Fieschi (Fieschi)	-	1318	28 June 1322/16 August 1339 husband's accession	after 1331 or after 1349		Luchino Visconti
	Violante of Saluzzo	Thomas I of Saluzzo (Aleramici)	-	1339		24 January 1349 husband's death	18 January 1388	Luchino Visconti
	Valentina Doria	Bernabò Doria, Lord of Sasello (Doria)	1290	1318	28 June 1322 husband's accession	4 July 1327 husband's death	27 August 1359	Stefano Visconti
	Egidiola Gonzaga	Filippino Gonzaga (Gonzaga)	-	1339/1342	24 January 1349 husband's accession	1354		Matteo II Visconti
	Bianca of Savoy	Aimone, Count of Savoy (Savoy)	1335/6	28 September 1350		4 August 1378 husband's death	31 December 1387	Galeazzo II Visconti
	Beatrice della Scala	Mastino II della Scala (Scaliger)	1331/3	27 September 1350		18 June 1384		Bernabò Visconti
	Caterina Visconti	Bernabò Visconti (Visconti)	1361	2 October 1380		1 May 1395 became Duchess	17 October 1404	Gian Galeazzo Visconti

== Duchess of Milan ==
=== House of Visconti, 1395–1447 ===
Picture	Name	Father	Birth	Marriage	Became Duchess	Ceased to be Duchess	Death	Spouse
	Caterina Visconti	Bernabò Visconti (Visconti)	1361	2 October 1380	1 May 1395 became Duchess	3 September 1402 husband's death	17 October 1404	Gian Galeazzo Visconti
	Antonia Malatesta	Carlo I Malatesta (Malatesta)	-	1408		16 May 1412 husband's death	-	Gian Maria Visconti
	Beatrice Cane	Ruggero Cane (Cane)	1372	24 July 1412		13 September 1418		Filippo Maria Visconti
	Marie of Savoy	Amadeus VIII, Count of Savoy (Savoy)	January 1411	24 September 1428		13 August 1447 husband's death	22 February 1479	Filippo Maria Visconti

- Ambrosian Republic (1447–1450)

=== House of Sforza, 1450–1499 ===
Picture	Name	Father	Birth	Marriage	Became Duchess	Ceased to be Duchess	Death	Spouse
	Bianca Maria Visconti	Filippo Maria Visconti (Visconti (illegitimate))	31 March 1425	25 October 1441	25 March 1450 husband's accession	8 March 1466 husband's death	28 October 1468	Francesco I Sforza
	Bona of Savoy	Louis, Duke of Savoy (Savoy)	10 August 1449	6 July 1468		26 December 1476 husband's death	23 November 1503	Galeazzo Maria Sforza
	Isabella of Naples	Alfonso II of Naples (Trastámara)	2 October 1470	2 February 1489		21 October 1494 husband's death	1 February 1524	Gian Galeazzo Sforza
	Beatrice d'Este	Ercole I d'Este (Este)	29 June 1475	18 January 1491	22 October 1494 husband's death	2 January 1497		Ludovico Sforza

=== House of Valois-Orléans, 1499–1500 ===
Picture	Name	Father	Birth	Marriage	Became Duchess	Ceased to be Duchess	Death	Spouse
	Anne of Brittany	Francis II, Duke of Brittany (Dreux-Montfort)	25 January 1477	8 January 1499	6 September 1499 husband's accession	5 February 1500 husband's deposition	9 January 1514	Louis XII of France

=== House of Sforza, 1500 ===
- None

=== House of Valois-Orléans, 1500–1512 ===
Picture	Name	Father	Birth	Marriage	Became Duchess	Ceased to be Duchess	Death	Spouse
	Anne, Duchess of Brittany	Francis II, Duke of Brittany (Dreux-Montfort)	25 January 1477	8 January 1499	17 April 1500 husband's accession	16 June 1512 husband's deposition	9 January 1514	Louis XII of France

=== House of Sforza, 1512–1515 ===
- None

=== House of Valois-Angoulême, 1515–1521 ===
Picture	Name	Father	Birth	Marriage	Became Duchess	Ceased to be Duchess	Death	Spouse
	Claude, Duchess of Brittany	Louis XII of France (Valois-Orléans)	14 October 1499	18 May 1514	11 October 1515 husband's accession	19 November 1521 husband's deposition	20 July 1524	Francis I of France

=== House of Sforza, 1521–1524 ===
- None

=== House of Valois-Angoulême, 1524–1525 ===
Picture	Name	Father	Birth	Marriage	Became Duchess	Ceased to be Duchess	Death	Spouse
	Claude, Duchess of Brittany	Louis XII of France (Valois-Orléans)	14 October 1499	18 May 1514	23 October 1524 husband's accession	20 July 1524		Francis I of France

=== House of Sforza, 1525–1535 ===
Picture	Name	Father	Birth	Marriage	Became Duchess	Ceased to be Duchess	Death	Spouse
	Christina of Denmark	Christian II of Denmark (Oldenburg)	November 1521	4 May 1534		24 October 1535 husband's death	10 December 1590	Francesco II Sforza

=== House of Habsburg, 1540–1700 ===
Picture	Name	Father	Birth	Marriage	Became Duchess	Ceased to be Duchess	Death	Spouse
	Maria Manuela, Princess of Portugal	John III of Portugal (Aviz)	15 October 1527	12 November 1543		12 July 1545		Philip II of Spain
	Mary I of England	Henry VIII of England (Tudor)	18 February 1516	25 July 1554		17 November 1558		Philip II of Spain
	Elisabeth of Valois	Henry II of France (Valois)	2 April 1545	22 June 1559		3 October 1568		Philip II of Spain
	Anna of Austria	Maximilian II, Holy Roman Emperor (Habsburg)	1 November 1549	4 May 1570		26 October 1580		Philip II of Spain
	Margaret of Austria	Charles II of Austria (House of Habsburg)	25 December 1584	18 April 1599		3 October 1611		Philip III of Spain
	Elisabeth of France	Henry IV of France (Bourbon)	22 November 1602	25 November 1615	31 March 1621 husband's ascension	6 October 1644		Philip IV of Spain
	Mariana of Austria	Ferdinand III, Holy Roman Emperor (Habsburg)	24 December 1634	7 October 1649		17 September 1665 husband's death	16 May 1696	Philip IV of Spain
	Marie Louise d'Orléans	Philippe I, Duke of Orléans (Orléans)	26 March 1662	19 November 1679		12 February 1689		Charles II of Spain
	Maria Anna of the Palatinate-Neuburg	Philip William, Elector Palatine (Wittelsbach)	28 October 1667	14 May 1690		1 November 1700 husband's death	16 July 1740	Charles II of Spain

=== House of Bourbon, 1700–1706 ===
Picture	Name	Father	Birth	Marriage	Became Duchess	Ceased to be Duchess	Death	Spouse
	Maria Luisa of Savoy	Victor Amadeus II of Sardinia (Savoy)	17 September 1688	2 November 1701		24 September 1706; Passed to Austria	14 February 1714	Philip V of Spain

=== House of Habsburg, 1707–1780 ===
Picture	Name	Father	Birth	Marriage	Became Duchess	Ceased to be Duchess	Death	Spouse
	Elisabeth Christine of Brunswick-Wolfenbüttel	Louis Rudolph, Duke of Brunswick-Wolfenbüttel (Welf)	28 August 1691	1 August 1708	17 April 1711 husband's ascension	20 October 1740 husband's death	21 December 1750	Charles VI, Holy Roman Emperor

=== House of Habsburg-Lorraine, 1780–1796 ===
Picture	Name	Father	Birth	Marriage	Became Duchess	Ceased to be Duchess	Death	Spouse
	Maria Luisa of Spain	Charles III of Spain (Bourbon)	24 November 1745	5 August 1765	20 February 1790 husband's ascension	1 March 1792 husband's death	15 May 1792	Leopold II, Holy Roman Emperor
	Maria Theresa of Naples and Sicily	Ferdinand I of the Two Sicilies (Bourbon-Two Sicilies)	6 June 1772	15 August 1790	1 March 1792 husband's ascension	29 April 1800 husband's desposition	13 April 1807	Francis II, Holy Roman Emperor

- Transpadane Republic (1796–1797)
- Cisalpine Republic (1797–1799)

=== House of Habsburg-Lorraine, 1799–1800 ===
Picture	Name	Father	Birth	Marriage	Became Duchess	Ceased to be Duchess	Death	Spouse
	Maria Theresa of Naples and Sicily	Ferdinand I of the Two Sicilies (Bourbon-Two Sicilies)	6 June 1772	15 August 1790	29 April 1799 husband's restoration	29 April 1800 husband's desposition	13 April 1807	Francis II, Holy Roman Emperor

- Cisalpine Republic (1800–1802)
- Italian Republic (1802–1805)
- Kingdom of Italy (1805–1814); See Also: List of Italian consorts
- Kingdom of Lombardy–Venetia (1815–1859/66); See Also: List of consorts of Lombardy-Venetia
