= Beatrice di Tenda =

1833 opera in two acts by Vincenzo Bellini

- Opera by Vincenzo Bellini
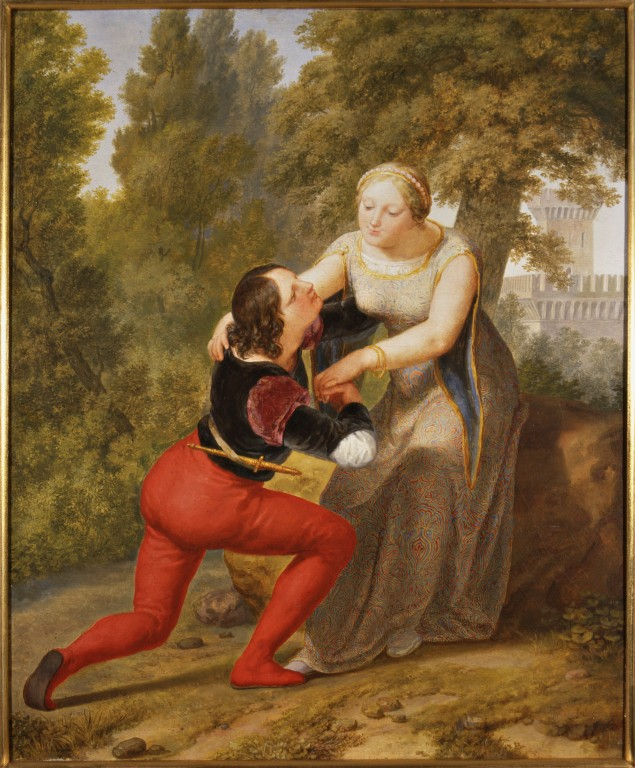
- Orombello and Beatrice, by Pelagio Palagi, 1845
- Librettist: Felice Romani
- Language: Italian
- Based on: Carlo Tedaldi Fores's play Beatrice Tenda
- Premiere: 16 March 1833; La Fenice, Venice

Beatrice di Tenda is a tragic opera in two acts by Vincenzo Bellini, from a libretto by Felice Romani, after the play of the same name by Carlo Tedaldi Fores.

Initially, a play by Alexandre Dumas was chosen as the subject for the opera, but Bellini had reservations about its suitability. After he and Giuditta Pasta (for whom the opera was to be written) had together seen the ballet based on the very different play, Tedaldi-Fores' Beatrice Tenda, in Milan in October 1832, she became enthusiastic about the subject and the composer set about persuading Romani that this was a good idea. Romani had his own concerns, the principal one being the close parallels with the story told in Donizetti's Anna Bolena, an opera which had established that composer's success in 1830. Against his better judgment, he finally agreed, although he failed to provide verses for many months.

Although unsuccessful at its premiere in Venice in 1833, Bellini felt that he had counteracted the horror of its story "by means of the music, colouring it now tremendously and now sadly". Later, after hearing of the opera's success in Palermo, Bellini wrote to his Neapolitan friend Francesco Florimo, stating that Beatrice "was not unworthy of her sisters". Also, it was Pasta's performances in the title role that overcame the public's hostility to the piece.

The opera was Bellini's penultimate work, coming between Norma (1831) and I puritani (1835) and it was the only one of his operas to be published in full score in his lifetime.

== Composition history ==
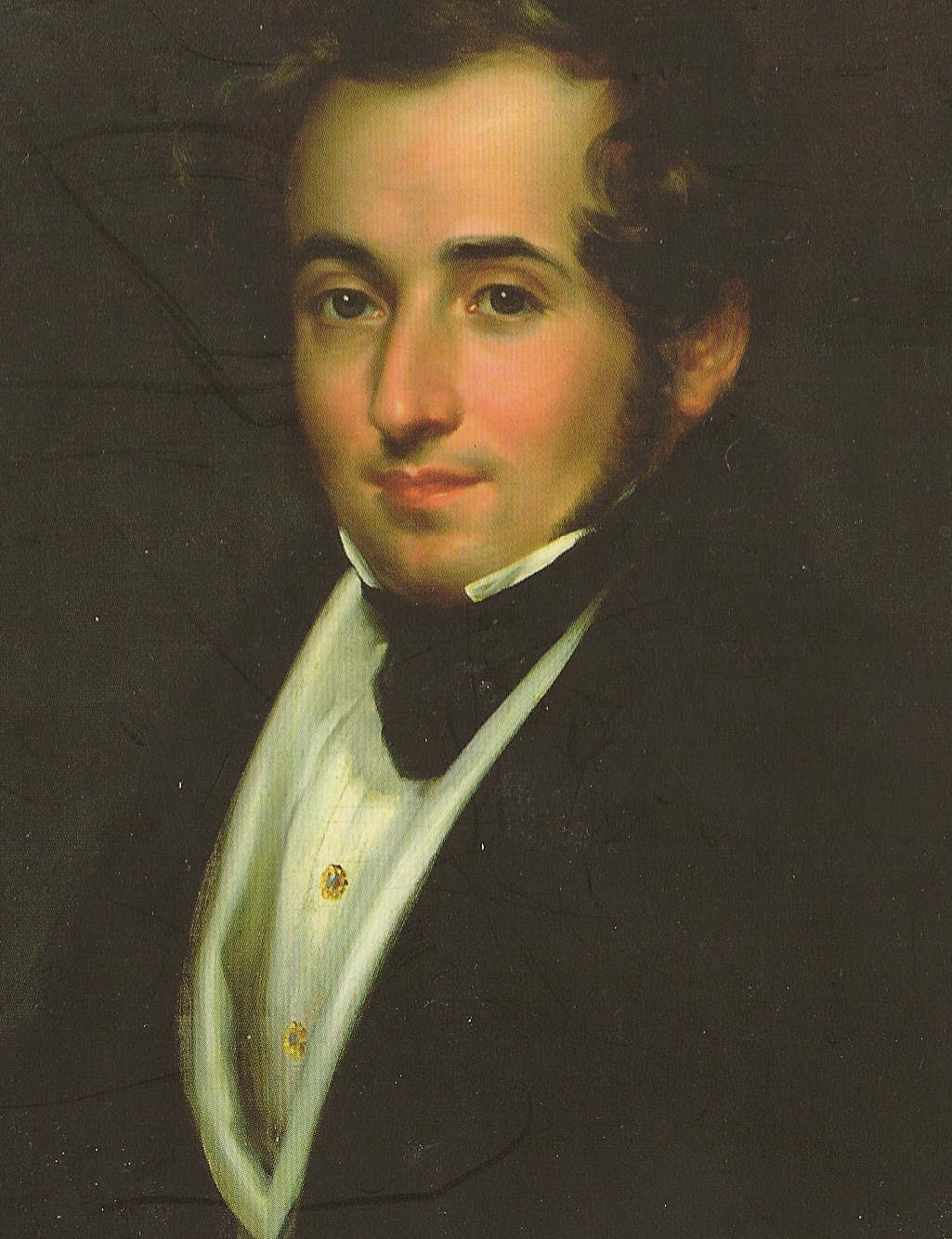
Bellini by Pietro Lucchini

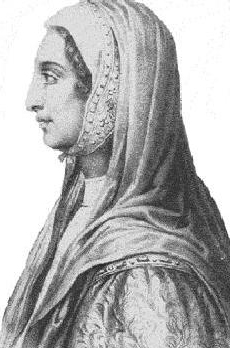
The original 15th-century Beatrice Lascaris di Tenda

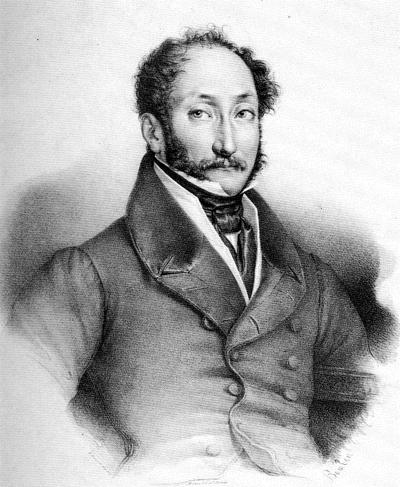
Librettist Felice Romani

With the leading role requiring a strong female character to be written for Pasta, composer and librettist met to consider a subject. Much of the initial work fell upon Romani, who had to look at a number of possible sources, but by 6 October, a subject had been agreed upon: it would be Christina regina di Svenzia from a play by Alexandre Dumas which had appeared in Paris in 1830.

However, within a month, Bellini had changed his mind and he was writing to Pasta stating that "the subject has been changed, and we'll write Beatrice di Tenda. I had a hard time persuading Romani, but persuade him I did, and with good reasons. Knowing that the subject pleases you, as you told me the evening when you saw the ballet. He is a man of good will, and I want him to show it also in wanting to prepare at least the first act for me swiftly".

Bellini's expectation that he would promptly receive the first act turned out to be a mistake. His librettist had vastly over-committed himself: by the time that Christina became Beatrice, he had made commitments to other composers for an October opera, for an opera for La Scala in February 1833, for a Parma production on 26 February, for La Scala on 10 March, and for Florence on 17 March.

In spite of Romani's contract deadlines, no progress towards the preparation of the libretto for Beatrice took place in November. Bellini announced that he would arrive in Venice in early December, but after the 10th, he became preoccupied with rehearsals for his stagings of Norma. However, the lack of any verses—for an opera which was supposed to be given its premiere in the second half of February—caused him to have to take action against Romani. He lodged a complaint with the governor of Venice who then contacted the governor of Milan, who then had his police contact Romani. The librettist finally arrived in Venice on 1 January 1833. He holed up to write Bellini's libretto, but, at the same time, Donizetti was equally incensed at delays in receiving a libretto from Romani for an opera which was to be Parisina.

When Norma opened on 26 December, it was a success but only because of Pasta; the other singers were not well received. This caused Bellini to fear for how Beatrice would turn out. Writing to his friend Santocanale in Palermo on 12 January, the composer was in despair, complaining of the short time to write his opera: "whose fault is that? that of my usual and original poet, the God of Sloth!" Their relationship quickly began to deteriorate: greetings including tu (the informal "you") gave way to voi (the formal "you") and they lived in different parts of Venice, unusual when they were working together outside their home city.

However, by 14 February, Bellini was reporting that he had only "another three pieces of the [first act of the] opera to do". He still had the second act to set to music. On that date he notes to Ferlito that "I hope to go onstage here on 6 March if I am able to finish the opera and prepare it."

As it turned out, Bellini was only able to prepare the opera for rehearsals by deleting sections of the libretto as well as some of the music for the finale, with the result that Beatrice's final aria had to be borrowed from Bianca e Fernando. (Bellini's sketches of a former duet between Beatrice and Agnese were realized by Vittorio Gui for a series of revivals from the late 1960s.)

In order to create more time for Bellini to finish, the La Fenice impresario Lanari padded the programme with older works or revivals, but that allowed only eight days for Beatrice before the scheduled end of the season. Not surprisingly, the audience, having waited so long for the new work, greeted the opening night on 16 March with little enthusiasm, their rejection demonstrated by cries of Norma! upon hearing Pasta's first aria, Ma la sola, oimė! son io, / che penar per lui si veda? ("Am I the only one to whom he has brought grief?"), thinking that they heard echoes of the music from the earlier opera. Their indifference was magnified after reading Romani's plea for "the reader's full indulgence" which appeared in the libretto with the suggestion that its faults were not his. But at the following two performances there were large crowds. For Bellini, his opera "was not unworthy of her sisters".

=== The break with Romani – and their reunion ===
There then began what Herbert Weinstock describes, in over twelve pages of text which include the long letters written by both sides in the dispute, "the journalistic storm over Beatrice di Tenda [which evolved] into the bitterest, most convoluted, and—at our distance from it—most amusing polemic in the annals of early nineteenth-century Italian opera". A back-and-forth series of letters in the Venetian daily, the Gazzetta privilegiata di Venezia began, the first of which complained about the delay in the production. This was followed by a torrent of anti-Beatrice letters, then a pro-Bellini reply, which laid the blame on Romani. This provoked a response from Romani himself, presenting his case against Bellini based largely on the composer's inability to decide on a subject and then finding his melodramma "touched up in a thousand ways", in order to make it acceptable to "the Milords of the Thames [who] await him", a sarcastic reference to Bellini's planned trip to London to stage the opera there. A further "cannonade" from Romani (says Weinstock) appeared in Milan's L'Eco in April.

However, the relationship was eventually repaired in correspondence between the two men in 1833 and 1834, with Bellini in Paris and Romani in Milan. They never met again.

== Performance history ==
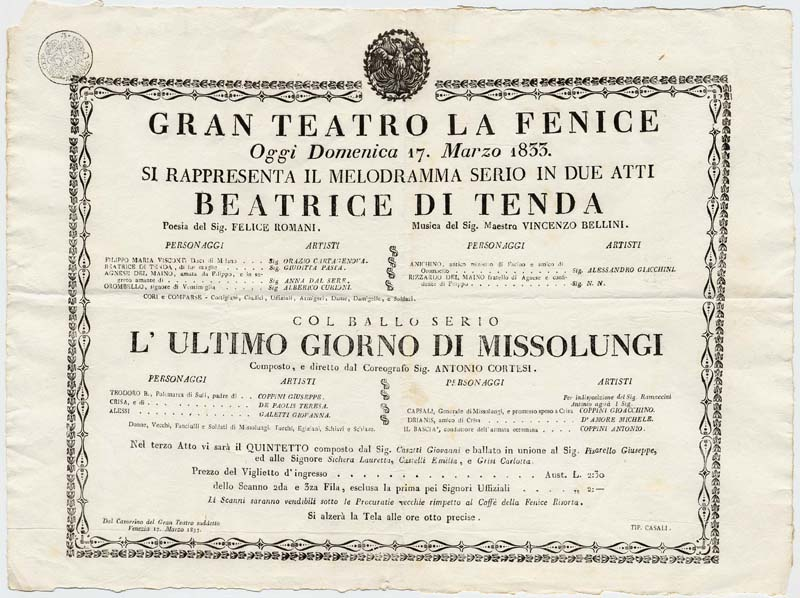
Poster advertising the premiere of Beatrice di Tenda

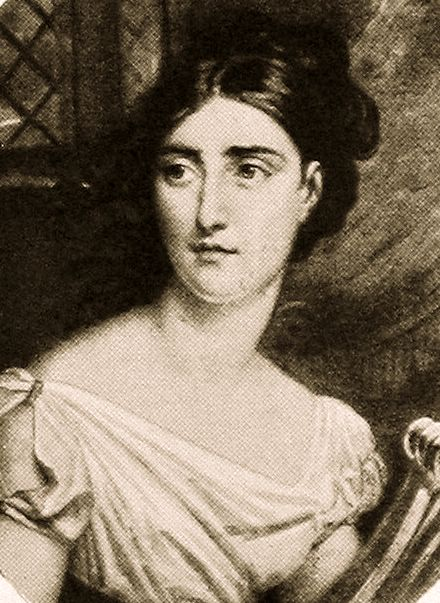
Soprano Giuditta Pasta sang in the Venice premiere

Bass Ignazio Marini sang in Palermo

19th century

Beatrice di Tenda received its first performance at the Teatro La Fenice in Venice on 16 March 1833 with Giuditta Pasta in the title role. The following year, it was staged at the Teatro Carolino in Palermo on 1 March with Marietta Albini, Giovanni Basadonna, and Ignazio Marini in the major roles. There, it was well received. Bellini was pleased.

So my Beatrice was well received? I am pleased....I myself did not believe [it] deserving of the fate that befell it in Venice, and I am convinced that outside reasons induced the audience to disapprove of it...

However, Venice's "fiasco" was relative because the opera was staged again at La Fenice in 1838, 1843, 1844 and then again in 1871. After it had come to Naples in 1834, initially at the del Fondo in July and then at the Teatro di San Carlo in November, Milan followed in February 1835 with 12 performances. Then came Rome, Messina, Bologna, Trieste where it was given under the name of Il Castello d'Ursino. Performances continued in Italy throughout the late 1830s and into the 1840s with some significant singers of the time appearing in major rules. These included Caroline Unger and Giuseppina Strepponi.

Outside Italy it was premiered in Vienna in March 1836, and also in London, Prague, Berlin (in German), Lisbon, Barcelona, Madrid, and Paris. In 1842 the American premiere of Beatrice was staged in New Orleans at the St Charles Theatre on 5 March 1841 followed by a New York presentation at a later date. It was also the first Bellini opera to be staged in Buenos Aires, in 1849. However, like many other bel canto operas, Beatrice practically disappeared from the stage after the 1870s.

20th century and beyond

At the centenary of the first performance, the opera was staged at the Teatro Massimo Bellini in Catania in January 1935, with Giannina Arangi-Lombardi singing the Countess. It took until April 1966 before it was heard there again under Vittorio Gui with Leyla Gencer singing the title role.

Beatrice di Tenda was revived in 1961 by the American Opera Society in New York with Joan Sutherland, Enzo Sordello, Marilyn Horne and Richard Cassilly under Nicola Rescigno, and in the same year at La Scala with Sutherland and Raina Kabaivanska and with Antonino Votto conducting. La Fenice presented the work again in January 1964 with Leyla Gencer. The 1960s saw occasional presentations.

Since that time the title role has been assumed by a number of other prominent sopranos, including Mirella Freni, June Anderson, Edita Gruberová, and Mariella Devia.

== Roles ==
Roles, voice types, premiere cast
| Role | Voice type | Premiere cast, 17 March 1833 |
|---|---|---|
| Beatrice di Tenda, Filippo's wife | soprano | Giuditta Pasta |
| Filippo Maria Visconti, Duke of Milan | baritone | Orazio Cartagenova |
| Agnese del Maino, in love with Orombello | mezzo-soprano | Anna Dal Serre |
| Orombello, Lord of Ventimiglia | tenor | Alberico Curioni |
| Anichino, loyal friend of Orombello | tenor | Alessandro Giacchini |
| Rizzardo del Maino, Agnese's brother and Filippo's confidant | tenor | |

== Synopsis ==
This is the story of Beatrice Lascaris di Tenda, the woman who was the widow of the condottiere Facino Cane and later the wife of Duke Filippo Maria Visconti, in 15th-century Milan. Filippo has grown tired of his wife Beatrice; she regrets her impetuous marriage to him after her first husband's death, a marriage that has delivered her and her people into the Duke's tyrannical power.

Time: 1418
Place: The Castle of Binasco, near Milan

=== Act 1 ===
Scene 1: "Internal courtyard of the Castle of Binasco. View of the facade of the illuminated palace"

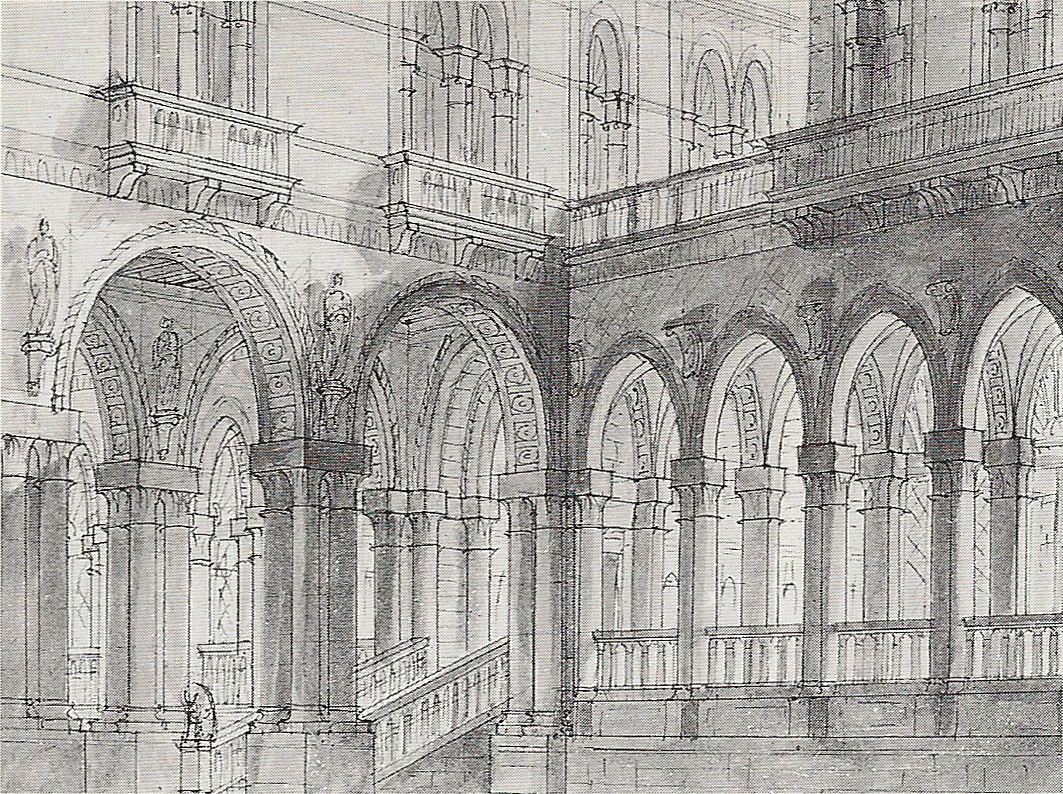
Francesco Bagnara's set designs for act 1, scene 1

Filippo Maria Visconti, the Duke of Milan, has attended a ball, but he leaves early and encounters his assembled courtiers. He is bored with everyone; all seem to be paying obeisance to his wife because they regard her as the more powerful, his title and power having come only from his marriage to her: “Such torment and such martyrdom I cannot bear much longer”. His sycophantic courtiers tell him how much they sympathize but wonder why he does not break free given his position as Duke. Also, they warn him that if he does not act, Beatrice's servants may well begin plotting against him.

Beautiful harp music is heard. Agnese, the current object of Filippo's desire, sings from afar that life is empty without love: (Aria: Agnese: Ah! Non pensar che pieno / "Ah! Don't believe that power brings fulfillment and joy"); then Filippo, who echoes her thoughts and states how much he loves her: (Aria:Filippo: O divina Agnese! Come t'adoro e quanto / "Oh Agnes, I should want none but you.") Again, the courtiers encourage him to seize the moment and break free after which he will have many desirable women available to him. All leave.

Scene 2: "Agnese's quarters"

Agnese appears, this time singing for a yet-unnamed love: Aria: Silenzio – E notte intorno / "Silence and night all around. May the voice of the lute guide you to me, my love". As she hopes that the anonymous letter, which she has sent, and now her song will guide him to her arms, Orombello suddenly appears, but he is attracted only by the sounds of sweet music. Since the letter was written to him, she assumes an attraction to her on his part, and he is somewhat confused over this turn of events. Somewhat bluntly, she moves towards asking if he is in love, and he decides to confide in her. He confesses that he is deeply in love and, when asked about a letter which she assumes to be the one she wrote to him, while he thought that the letter was sent to him from Beatrice, his secret love interest. At that point, she starts talking about Filippo, depicting him as a rival to Orombello: (Duet: Sì: rivale… rival regnante / "A royal rival"), as she thinks Orombello is in love with her and is widely known that Filippo instead is interested in Agnese, despite being married with Beatrice. Orombello misunderstands this, thinking simply that Agnese has discovered his secret love for Beatrice and decides to reveal to her the whole truth. This sudden discover drives her furious; her tenderness turns to vitriol and in a dramatic finale, she explodes while he attempts to protect Beatrice's honor from her insults: (Duet: La sua vita? La sua fama? E la mia, la mia spietato nulla è dunque agli occhi tuoi? / "Her life? Her fame? And mine, mine, pitiless man, does it mean anything to you?").

Scene 3: "A grove in the ducal garden"

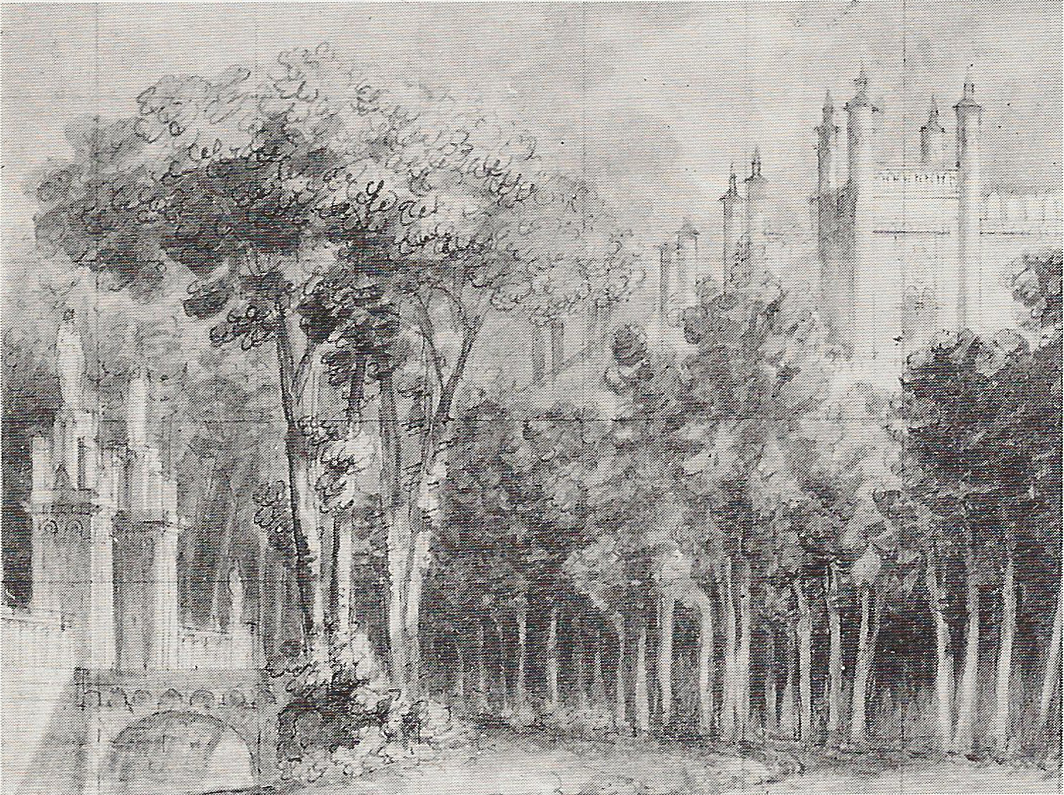
Francesco Bagnara's set designs for act 1, scene 3

Beatrice enters one of her secret places. She is relaxed: "Here I can breathe freely among these shady trees" she says, as her ladies appear, also happy to be in the sun. They try to comfort her and express their affection, but she describes her unhappiness and frustration against Filippo: (Aria: Ma la sola, oimė! son io, / che penar per lui si veda? / "Am I the only one to whom he has brought grief"? she asks) and feels her shame, to the sorrow of her ladies. In a finale, first Beatrice, then the ladies express their frustrations: (Cabaletta: Ah! la pena in lor piombò / "Ah, they have been punished for the love that ruined me").

Filippo sees them in the distance and, believing she is avoiding him, confronts her. He questions her, regarding her as unfaithful: "I can see your guilty thoughts", he says. In a duet, he admits that his jealousy is due to the power she has, but confronts her with proof of her support for her subjects' protests by producing some secret papers stolen from her apartment. She responds that she will listen to the peoples' complaints and confronts him: Se amar non puoi, rispettami / "If you cannot love me, respect me! At least leave my honour intact!"

[The libretto noted below includes a scene between Filippo and Rizzardo which is absent from the Gruberova DVD production]

Scene 4: "A remote part of the Castle of Binasco. At one side, the statue of Facino Cane (Beatrice's first husband)"

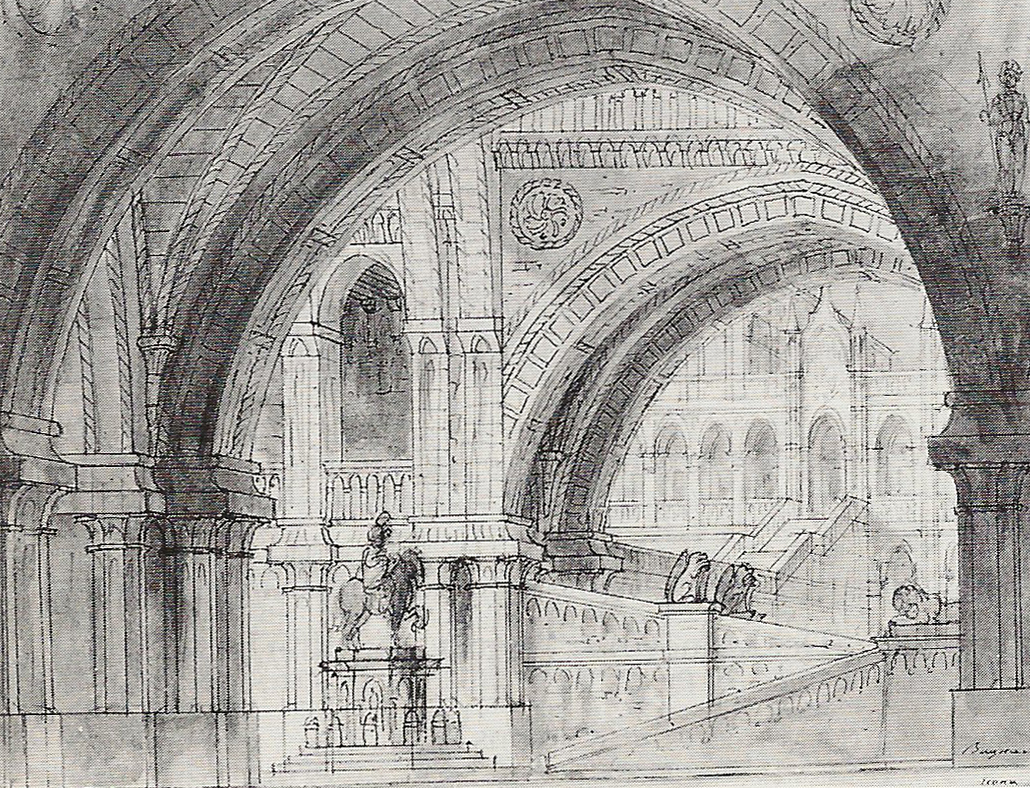
Francesco Bagnara's set designs for act 1, scene 4

Filippo's soldiers are seeking Orombello and conclude that eventually either love or anger will cause him to give himself away and they must match his cunning. They continue the search.

Beatrice enters carrying a portrait of her beloved deceased husband, Facino. Aria: Il mio dolore, e l'ira... inutile ira / "My sorrow and anger, my futile anger I must hide from everyone" and she pleads with the Facino's spirit: "alone, unprotected, unarmed, I'm abandoned by everybody". "Not by me" a voice cries out—and it is Orombello who excitedly tells her his plans to rally the troops and help her free herself. She crushes him saying that she does not highly regard his expertise in security matters. Orombello tells of how his compassion was mistaken for love, but that he gradually came to love her and, as he kneels to protest his love and refusal to leave her, Filippo and Agnese enter, proclaiming the two traitors of having an affair. Filippo calls the guards, courtiers arrive, and all express their conflicting emotions in a scene finale with Filippo recognising that Beatrice's reputation is besmirched, she realises that "this shame is my due reward for making this wretch my equal", and Orombello tries to persuade the Duke that she is innocent. The couple is taken away for trial for adultery.

=== Act 2 ===
Scene 1: "Gallery in the Castle of Binasco ready for the sitting of a tribunal. Guards at the door"

In a major opening chorus, the courtiers learn from Beatrice's maids of the terrible torture that has been applied to Orombello and, "no longer able to withstand the atrocious suffering, he declared his guilt", thus implicating Beatrice. The Court is summoned and Anichino, Orombello's friend, pleads for Beatrice. Agnese declares that the "longed-for hour of my revenge has come" but, at the same time she is troubled. Filippo addresses the judges. Beatrice is brought in, and protests: "who gave you the right to judge me?" Orombello then appears and Beatrice is told that she has been denounced. "What do you expect to gain from lying?" she demands of him. He desperately seeks forgiveness from Beatrice: under torture "my mind became delirious, it was pain, not I that spoke" and he proclaims her innocence to the amazement of all. She forgives him.

Filippo is touched by her words: (Aria-to himself: In quegli atti, in quegli accenti / V'ha poter ch'io dir non posso / "In these actions and in these words there is a power I cannot explain"), but he quickly recovers and rejects weak-minded pity. Together, all express their individual feelings with Filippo ruthlessly pressing on while Agnese is remorseful. However, he does announce that the sentence shall be delayed.

The Court overrules him, stating that more torture should be applied until the truth is spoken. Again, Filippo changes his mind and supports the Court's decision. Agnese pleads with Filppo for Beatrice and Orombello, confessing her own behaviour in defaming them. The couple is led away, with Filippo and Agnese, full of remorse, left alone. She realises that things have gone much further than she had expected and begs Filippo to drop all the charges. However, not wishing to look weak, he dismisses the idea and orders her to leave.

Alone, Filippo wonders why others suffer remorse and he does not, but confesses that he is in the grip of terror. When Anichino announces that Beatrice has not broken under torture, but nevertheless, the court has condemned the couple to death, he brings the death warrant for signature. Filippo is even more conflicted, stating first that he must be firm and then remembering the joy he experienced with Beatrice: (Aria: Qui mi accolse oppresso, errante, / Qui dié fine a mie sventure... / "She welcomed me here, oppressed and homeless, here she put an end to my misfortunes. I am repaying her love with torture")

Filippo declares to all who have now assembled that Beatrice shall live, but courtiers announce that troops loyal to Beatrice and to the late condottiere Facino are about to storm the walls. Hearing this, he signs the execution order and tries to justify his actions to the crowd, blaming Beatrice's behaviour: (cabaletta finale: Non son'io che la condanno; / Ė la sua, l'altrui baldanza. / "It is not only I who condemn her, but her own and others' audacity...Two realms cannot be united while she lives.")

Scene 2: "Ground level vestibule above the castle prisons. Beatrice's maidens and servants emerge from the cells. All are mourning. Sentinels everywhere"

Beatrice's ladies gather outside the cell while Beatrice prays. In her cell, she affirms that she said nothing under torture: (Aria: Nulla diss'io...Di sovrumana forza / Mi armava il cielo... Io nulla dissi, oh, gioja / "I said nothing! Heaven gave me superhuman strength. I said nothing..."). Agnese enters and confesses that it was she who instigated, through jealousy, the plot to accuse the couple. She explains that she was in love with Orombello and that she believed Beatrice to be her rival. From his cell, Orombello's voice is heard (Aria: Angiol di pace / "Angel of peace"). Along with the two women, he forgives Agnese as does Beatrice. Agnese leaves and Beatrice declares herself to be ready for death. (Aria finale: Deh! se un'urna ė a me concessa / Senza un fior non la lasciate / "Oh, if I'm vouchsafed a tomb, Leave it not bare of flowers".) Anicino and the ladies lament; in a spirited finale, Beatrice declares "the death that I am approaching is a triumph not defeat. I leave my sorrows back on earth."

== Recordings ==
| Year | Cast (Beatrice, Orombello, Agnese, Filippo) | Conductor, opera house and orchestra | Label |
|---|---|---|---|
| 1964 | Leyla Gencer, Juan Oncina, Antigone Sgourda, Mario Zanasi | Vittorio Gui, La FeniceTeatro La Fenice di Venezia Orchestra e Coro (Live recording, 10 October 1964) | CD: Myto; Cat: MCD 065.334 |
| 1966 | Joan Sutherland, Luciano Pavarotti, Josephine Veasey, Cornelius Opthof | Richard Bonynge, London Symphony Orchestra, Ambrosian Opera Chorus | CD: Decca; Cat: 433 706-2 |
| 1986 | Mariana Nicolesco, Vincenzo La Scola, Stefania Toczyska, Piero Cappuccilli | Alberto Zedda, Monte Carlo Orchestra and the Prague Philharmonic Choir | CD: Sony; Cat: SM3K 64539 |
| 1987 | June Anderson, Don Bernardini, Elena Zilio, Armando Ariostini | Gianfranco Masini, La Fenice orchestra and chorus (Live recording; source and conductor in doubt) | CD: Opera d'Oro; Cat: OPD-1174 |
| 1992 | Lucia Aliberti, Martin Thompson, Camille Capasso, Paolo Gavanelli | Fabio Luisi, Deutsche Oper Berlin chorus and orchestra | CD: Berlin Classics; Cat: 0010422BC |
| 1992 | Edita Gruberová, Don Bernardini, Vesselina Kasarova, Igor Mozorov | Pinchas Steinberg; ORF Symphony Orchestra, Vienna Children's Choir | CD: Nightingale Classics; Cat: NC 070560-2 |
| 2002 | Edita Gruberová, Raúl Hernández, Stefania Kaluza, Michael Volle | Marcello Viotti; Opernhaus Zürich Orchestra and Chorus | DVD: TDK; Cat: DVOPBDT |
| 2010 | Dimitra Theodossiou, Alejandro Roy, José Maria Lo Monaco, Michele Kalmandi | Antonio Pirolli, Orchestra and Chorus of Teatro Massimo Bellini, Catania, | Blu-ray and DVD: Dynamic, Cat: NHK 55675 and 33675 |
| 2024 | Tamara Wilson, Pene Pati, Theresa Kronthaler, Quinn Kelsey | Mark Wigglesworth, Paris Opera Orchestra and Chorus (Production: Peter Sellars) | Streaming video: Paris Opera Play |
