= Visconti Castle (Binasco) =

Castle in Lombardy

- Castello Visconteo di Binasco
- Binasco, Lombardy, Northern Italy
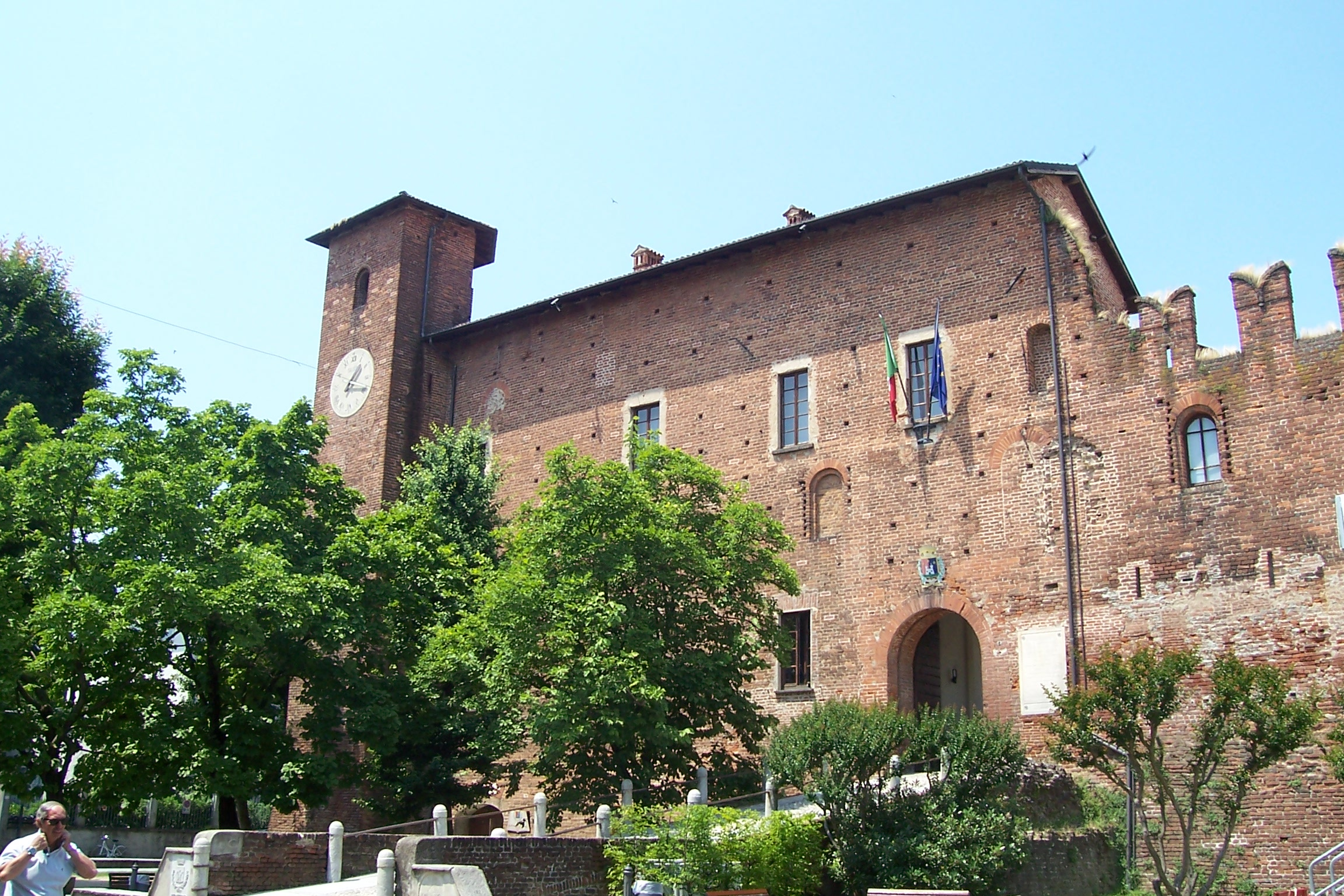
- Front of the castle

Site information
- Type: Medieval castle
- Owner: Municipality of Binasco
- Open to the public: Yes
- Condition: Good

Location
- Coordinates: 45°19′52″N 9°05′57″E

Site history
- Built: 14th century
- Built by: Luchino Visconti
- Materials: Bricks
- Events: Death sentence and execution of Beatrice di Tenda (1418)

The Visconti Castle of Binasco is a medieval castle in Binasco, Metropolitan City of Milan, Lombardy, Northern Italy. It is famous for having been the prison and execution place of Beatrice di Tenda (Duchess of Milan and wife of Filippo Maria Visconti), who was arrested and sentenced to death for adultery in 1418. Today, it is the seat of the Municipality of Binasco.

== History ==
Luchino Visconti, Lord of Milan, built the castle, probably between 1315 and 1319, when the nearby church of Saint Stephan was erected. Its first mention dates back to 1329 when Azzone Visconti and his uncle Giovanni used it as a prison for their political opponents.

The building followed the Visconti castle model of the Lombard plains: a quadrangular layout with a central courtyard, corner towers, and the surrounding moat. The walls were made entirely of exposed brick.

In the 17th century, the castle underwent transformations and restorations. At the end of the 19th century, it was sacked during the Napoleonic age, and in 1869, a devastating fire struck it. The current building results from repeated restorations that preserved the appearance of the initial castle. Two towers are still visible along the south front.

== Today ==
In good condition, the castle belongs partly to the Municipality of Binasco and partly to the Province of Milan. It hosts public offices of the town council, the public library, and the Carabinieri station.

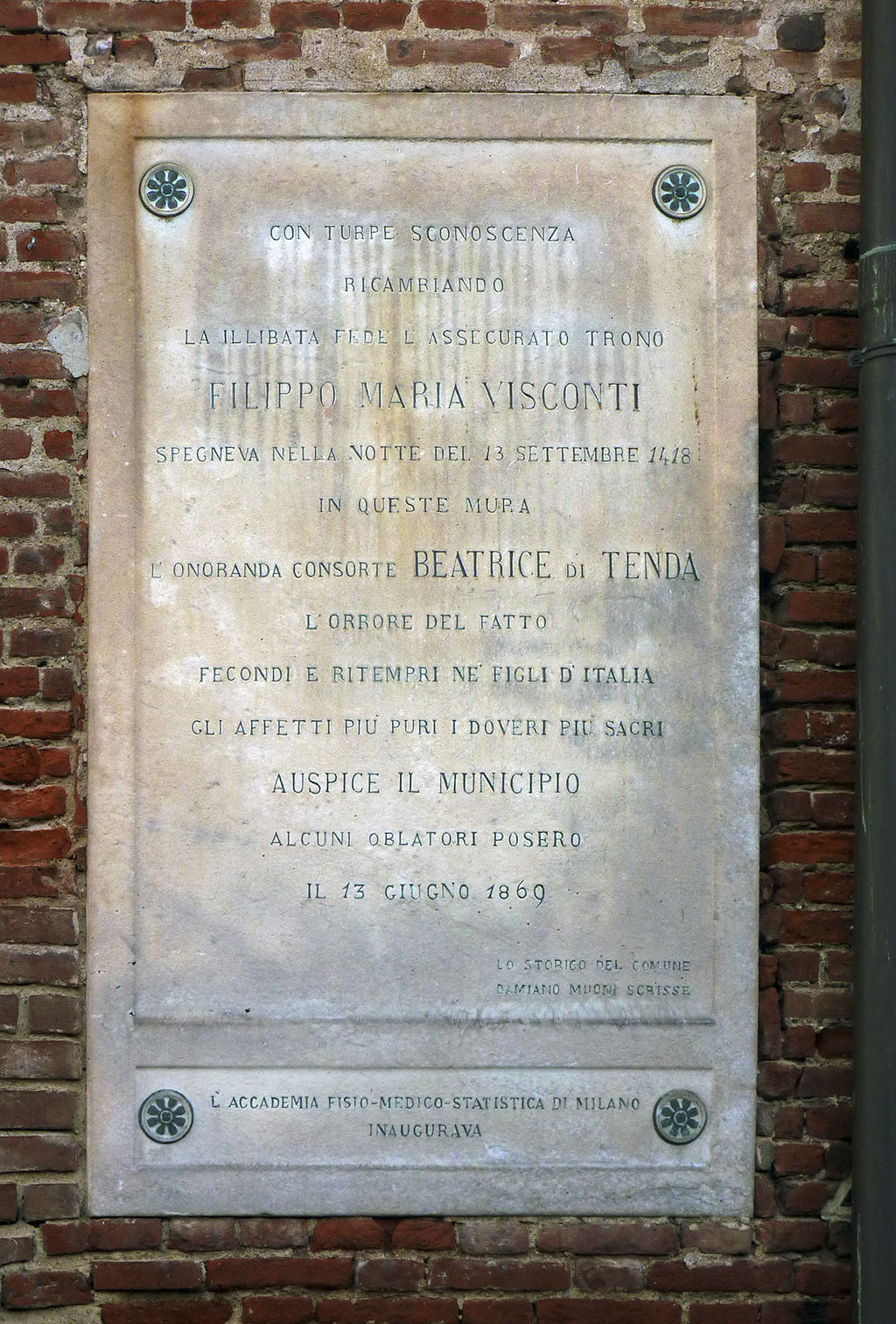
A plate commemorates the memory of Beatrice di Tenda, executed in the castle in 1418

== Sources ==
- Conti, Flavio; Hybsch, Vincenzo; Vincenti, Antonello (1990). I castelli della Lombardia. Provincie di Milano e Pavia (in Italian). Novara: Istituto Geografico de Agostini. ISBN 9788840291086. OCLC 635639773.
- Del Tredici, Federico; Rossetti, Edoardo (2012). Castle trails from Milan to Bellinzona - Guide to the dukedom's castles. Milan: Nexi-Castelli del ducato. ISBN 9788896451069. OCLC 955635027. Archived from the original on July 13, 2024.
