= Benzoni =

Benzoni is an Italian surname. Notable people with the surname include:

- Giovanni Maria Benzoni (1809–1873), Italian sculptor
- Girolamo Benzoni 16th-century Italian merchant and adventurer
- Juliette Benzoni (1920–2016), French writer
- Leonardo Benzoni (died 1552), Italian Roman Catholic bishop
- Martino Benzoni (1451–1492), Italian sculptor
- Rutilio Benzoni (1542–1613), Italian Roman Catholic bishop
- Sylvie Benzoni (born 1967), French mathematician
