= Andrea Biglia =

Italian Renaissance humanist (1395–1435)

Andrea Biglia OSA (c. 1395 – 1435) was an Italian Renaissance humanist, known as a moral philosopher and historian.

== Life ==
He was born in Milan, and became an Augustinian hermit in 1412. After time studying in Padua he came to the Santo Spirito, Florence in 1418.

In 1423 he moved to Bologna, and by the end of the 1420s, after a period at Pavia. He was teaching at the University of Siena, having left Bologna because of anti-papal feeling in 1428. There he died of the plague in 1435.

== Associations ==
An early influence was Gasparino Barzizza at Padua, and Sicco Polenton, another pupil there, became a friend. Biglia in Florence met the humanist circle including Ambrogio Traversari: others were Giovanni Aurispa, Leonardo Bruni and Niccolò Niccoli. In Bologna he associated with Niccolò Albergati. There he encountered Aurispa again, and the other humanists Leon Battista Alberti, Giovanni Lamola, Antonio Panormita, and Giovanni Toscanella. His interest in Islamic history was stimulated by the 1432 visit to Siena of Sigismund of Hungary.

== Works ==
Biglia wrote a treatise against the populist preacher Bernardino of Siena. In connection with this dispute, Biglia wrote on the Holy Name of Jesus, and these theological writings proved influential. Some of Biglia's own sermons survive.

As a historian he wrote on Eastern Christendom and Islam, including a history of the Mongols. His best-known work Rerum mediolanensium historia was a history of Milan in the period 1402–1431 in the style of Livy. In it he was an apologist for the 1424 taking of Forlì by the Visconti.

As a translator he worked on the Vita Timoleontis of Plutarch from Greek, which he had learned at some point, and some of Aristotle.
