= Martino Benzoni =

Italian sculptor

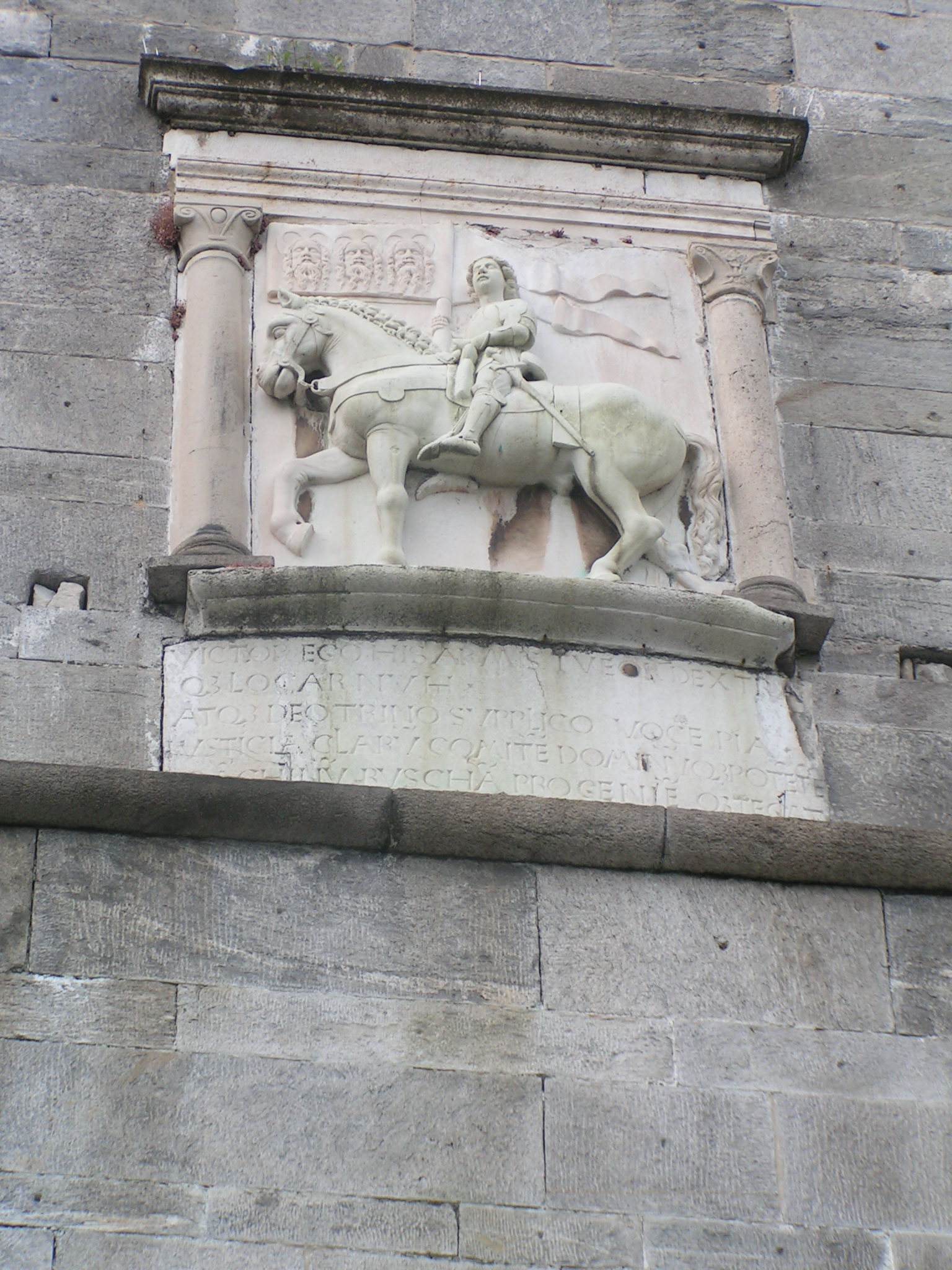
Relief at San Vittore, Muralto

Martino Benzoni (1451–1492) was an Italian sculptor. He is most known for his work Saint Victor Maurus (San Vittore Il Moro) relief, from 1460 to 1462, at Collegiata di San Vittore, in Muralto, Ticino, Switzerland.
