= List of dukes of Milan =

Duke of Milan
- Arms of Francesco I Sforza. Quarterly: 1st and 4th, Or an eagle stand Sable, wearing a crown; 2nd and 3rd, Argent a serpent ripple Azure, wearing a crown, eating a moor Gules.
- Creation date: 5 September 1395
- Created by: Wenceslaus, King of the Romans
- First holder: Gian Galeazzo Visconti
- Last holder: Francis II
- Extinction date: 9 June 1815
- Seat: Sforza Castle

Milan was ruled by dukes from the 14th century to 1814, after which it was incorporated into the Kingdom of Lombardy–Venetia by the Congress of Vienna.

== List of dukes of Milan ==
=== House of Visconti ===
In 1395, Gian Galeazzo Visconti was titled Duke of Milan by King Wenceslaus, who sold the title under the payment of circa 100,000 florins. Since that moment, all the following rulers of Milan were styled as dukes.

Duke	Arms	Tenure	Marriage(s) Issue	Succession right(s)
Gian Galeazzo; 1351–1402 (aged 50)		5 September 1395 – 3 September 1402	(1) Isabella of France (m. 1360; d. 1372); 4 children (2 survived to adulthood) (2) Caterina Visconti (m. 1380; w. 1402); 2 children 2 illegitimate children	Son of Galeazzo II Visconti (primogeniture); Title purchased from German king Wenceslaus IV
Giovanni Maria; 1388–1412 (aged 23)		3 September 1402 – 16 May 1412	Antonia Malatesta of Cesena (m. 1408; w. 1412); Childless	Son of Gian Galeazzo Visconti (primogeniture)
Filippo Maria; 1392–1447 (aged 54)		16 May 1412 – 13 August 1447	(1) Beatrice of Tenda (m. 1412; ex. 1418); Childless (2) Mary of Savoy (m. 1428; w. 1447); Childless 1 illegitimate child	Son of Gian Galeazzo Visconti (blood proximity)

=== House of Sforza (1st rule) ===
After the death of Filippo Maria in 1447, the main line of Visconti went extinct. Benefited by political chaos, a cabal of wealthy citizens, academics and clerics declared the Duchy dissolved and proclaimed the Golden Ambrosian Republic. The republic was never recognized and the neighboring states of Venice and Savoy tried to expand their fiefdoms in Lombardy, as well as France. Taking advantage of the state's weakness and the resurgent Guelph-Ghibelline conflict, the commander-in-chief of the Milanese forces, Francesco I Sforza, defected from Milan to Venice in 1448, and two years later, after several side switches and cunning strategies, Sforza entered the city during Annunciation. He was then declared the new Duke of Milan by the City Council, using as a claim his marriage with Bianca Maria Visconti, illegitimate daughter of Filippo Maria.

Duke	Arms	Tenure	Marriage(s) Issue	Succession right(s)
Francesco I 1401–1466 (aged 64)		25 March 1450 – 8 March 1466	(1) Polissena Ruffo (m. 1418; d. 1420); 1 daughter (died in infancy) (2) A Jacopo Caldora's daughter (m. 1424; ann. 142?); Childless (3) Bianca Maria Visconti (m. 1441; w. 1466); 8 children Giovanna d'Acquapendente; 7 illegitimate children (5 survived to adulthood)	By pretence: Son-in-law of Filippo Maria Visconti; De facto: Right of conquest
Galeazzo Maria; 1444–1476 (aged 32)		8 March 1466 – 26 December 1476	Bona of Savoy (m. 1468; w. 1503); 4 children Lucrezia Landriani; 4 illegitimate children Lucia Marliani; 2 illegitimate children	Son of Francesco I Sforza (primogeniture)
Gian Galeazzo; 1469–1494 (aged 25)		26 December 1476 – 21 October 1494	Isabella of Aragon (m. 1489; w. 1494); 3 children	Son of Galeazzo Maria (primogeniture)
Ludovico; 1452–1508 (aged 55)		21 October 1494 – 17 September 1499	Beatrice d'Este (m. 1491; d. 1499); 2 children Bernardina de Corradis; 2 legitimized children Cecilia Gallerani; 1 legitimized child Lucrezia Crivelli; 2 legitimized children	Son of Francesco I Sforza (blood proximity)

=== House of Valois (1st rule) ===
In 1494, Ludovico Sforza usurped the throne of Milan, after probably poisoning his nephew Gian Galeazzo. After the threats of the Venetians, Ludovico solicited French king Charles VIII to descend into Italy, starting the First Italian War. After Ludovico's betrayal and alliance with the League of Venice in 1495, the French were defeated in the Battle of Fornovo and were unable to expand in Italy. Charles VIII's top general and cousin, Louis II, Duke of Orléans (future Louis XII), was humiliated and due to his personal hate toward Ludovico Sforza, started to claim the Duchy of Milan for himself, quoting his paternal descendance from Valentina Visconti and Gian Galeazzo's last will. After Louis XII's ascension to the French Throne in 1499, he started the Second Italian War to conquer Milan and Naples. With French armies near Pavia, Ludovico and his loyalists left Milan on 17 September 1499 to flee toward Germany. This left Louis XII as the only Duke of Milan, entering the city on 6 October 1499.

Duke	Arms	Tenure	Marriage(s) Issue	Succession right(s)
Louis XII (Luigi XII); 1462–1515 (aged 52)		6 October 1499 – 20 June 1512	(1) Joan of France (m. 1476; ann. 1498); Childless (2) Anne of Brittany (m. 1499; d. 1514); 2 Daughters (3) Mary of England (m. 1514; w. 1515); Childless	Great-grandson of Gian Galeazzo Visconti; Legitimate heir according to Gian Galeazzo's will

=== House of Sforza (2nd rule) ===
Ludovico Sforza was captured on February 1500, dying in prison in 1508. His son Massimiliano became the Sforza claimant to the Milanese throne, which he finally re-gained in January 1513, six months after the Swiss army's entrance in Milan.

Duke	Arms	Tenure	Marriage(s) Issue	Succession right(s)
Massimiliano; 1493–1530 (aged 37)		16 June 1512 – 5 October 1515	Never married	Son of Ludovico Sforza (primogeniture)

=== House of Valois (2nd rule) ===
After their defeat in the Battle of Marignano in 1515, the Swiss retired from Milan and Massimiliano was imprisoned by the returning French troops. He waived his rights to Milan for the sum of 30,000 ducats and continued to live in France.

Duke	Arms	Tenure	Marriage(s) Issue	Succession right(s)
Francis I (Francesco I); 1494–1547 (aged 52)		11 October 1515 – 20 November 1521	(1) Claude of France (m. 1514; d. 1524); 7 children (2) Eleanor of Austria (m. 1530; w. 1547); Childless	Great great-grandson of Gian Galeazzo Visconti; Legitimate heir according to Gian Galeazzo's will

=== House of Sforza (3rd rule) ===
By November 1521, the French situation had deteriorated considerably. Emperor Charles V, Henry VIII of England, and Pope Leo X signed an alliance against Francis on 28 November. Odet de Foix, Viscount of Lautrec, the French governor of Milan, was tasked with resisting the Imperial and Papal forces; he was outmatched by Prospero Colonna, however, and by late November had been forced out of Milan and had retreated to a ring of towns around the Adda River. For the third time and last time, the Sforza were restored to power.

Duke	Arms	Tenure	Marriage(s) Issue	Succession right(s)
Francesco II; 1495–1535 (aged 40)		4 April 1522 – 24 October 1535	Christina of Denmark (m. 1534; w. 1535); Childless	Son of Ludovico Sforza (blood proximity)

=== House of Habsburg ===
In 1535, after the death of the heirless Francesco II Sforza, Emperor Charles V annexed the Duchy as a vacant imperial state in order to avoid other claims by the French or the collateral branches of Sforza.

=== House of Habsburg-Spain ===
In 1540, the Duchy was secretly given as a gift to Charles V's son Philip, Prince of Asturias. This was made official at the abdication of Charles V in 1555. In 1556, Philip became Philip II of Spain and Milan entered in personal union with the Spanish Crown.

Duke	Arms	Tenure	Marriage(s) Issue	Succession right(s)
Philip I (Filippo I); 1527–1598 (aged 71)		11 October 1540 – 13 September 1598	(1) Maria Manuela of Portugal (m. 1543; d. 1545); 1 child (2) Queen Mary I of England (m. 1554; d. 1558); Childless (3) Elisabeth of Valois (m. 1559; d. 1568); 2 children (4) Anna of Austria (m. 1570; d. 1580); 5 children (1 survived to adulthood)	Title given by Emperor Charles V
Philip II (Filippo II); 1578–1621 (aged 42)		13 September 1598 – 31 March 1621	Margaret of Austria (m. 1599; d. 1611); 8 children (5 survived to adulthood)	Son of Philip I (blood proximity)
Philip III (Filippo III); 1605–1665 (aged 60)		31 March 1621 – 17 September 1665	(1) Elisabeth of France (m. 1615; d. 1644); 8 children (2 survived to adulthood) (2) Mariana of Austria (m. 1649; w. 1665); 5 children (2 survived to adulthood) María Calderón; 1 legitimized child	Son of Philip II (primogeniture)
Charles I (Carlo I); 1661–1700 (aged 38)		17 September 1665 – 1 November 1700	(1) Marie Louise d’Orléans (m. 1679; d. 1689); Childless (2) Maria Anna of Neuburg (m. 1690; w. 1700); Childless	Son of Philip III (blood proximity)

=== House of Bourbon-Anjou ===
In September 1700, Charles became ill; by 28 September he was no longer able to eat and Portocarrero persuaded him to alter his Will in favour of Louis XIV's grandson, Philip of Anjou. When Charles died on 1 November 1700, the throne was offered to Philip, who was proclaimed King of Spain on 16 November 1700. This was accepted by Britain and the Dutch Republic, among others. Disputes over division of territories and commercial rights led to the War of the Spanish Succession in 1701.

Duke	Arms	Tenure	Marriage(s) Issue	Succession right(s)
Philip V (Filippo V); 1683–1746 (aged 62)		1 November 1700 – 7 March 1714	(1) Maria Luisa of Savoy (m. 1701; d. 1714); 4 children (2 survived to adulthood) (2) Elisabeth Farnese (m. 1714; w. 1746); 6 children	Heir-general of Charles I (See Charles I's last will); grandnephew of Charles I

=== House of Habsburg-Austria (then Habsburg-Lorraine) ===
After the Treaty of Rastatt of 1714, Emperor Charles VI officially gained the Duchy of Milan, a possession considered vital to the security of Austria's southern border. Since that moment, Milan was a permanent possession of the Austrian branch of the Habsburg dynasty.

Duke	Arms	Tenure	Marriage(s) Issue	Succession right(s)
Charles II (Carlo II); 1685–1740 (aged 55)		7 March 1714 – 20 October 1740	Elisabeth Christine of Brunswick (m. 1708; w. 1740); 4 children (3 survived to adulthood)	Cousin-once-removed of Charles I; Dukedom granted by Treaty of Rastatt (1714)
Maria Theresa (Maria Teresa); 1717–1780 (aged 63)		20 October 1740 – 29 November 1780	Francis I, Holy Roman Emperor (m. 1736; d. 1765); 15 children (10 survived to adulthood)	Daughter of Charles II (semi-salic blood proximity; see Pragmatic Sanction of 1713)
Joseph I (Giuseppe I); 1741–1790 (aged 48)		29 November 1780 – 20 February 1790	(1) Isabella of Parma (m. 1760; d. 1763); 2 children (Not survived to adulthood) (2) Maria Josepha of Bavaria (m. 1765; d. 1767); Childless	Son of Maria Theresa (primogeniture)
Leopold I (Leopoldo I); 1747–1792 (aged 44)		20 February 1790 – 1 March 1792	Maria Luisa of Spain (m. 1765; w. 1792); 16 children (14 survived to adulthood)	Son of Maria Theresa (blood proximity)
Francis II (Francesco II); 1768–1835 (aged 67)		1 March 1792 – 15 May 1796	(1) Elisabeth of Württemberg (m. 1788; d. 1790); 1 child (Not survived to adulthood) (2) Maria Theresa of Naples and Sicily (m. 1790; d. 1807); 11 children (7 survived to adulthood) (3) Maria Ludovika of Austria-Este (m. 1808; d. 1816); Childless (4) Caroline Augusta of Bavaria (m. 1816; w. 1835); Childless	Son of Leopold I (primogeniture)
Francis II (Francesco II); 1768–1835 (aged 67)		Interregnum (1796–1814): Revolutionary and Napoleonic Wars	(1) Elisabeth of Württemberg (m. 1788; d. 1790); 1 child (Not survived to adulthood) (2) Maria Theresa of Naples and Sicily (m. 1790; d. 1807); 11 children (7 survived to adulthood) (3) Maria Ludovika of Austria-Este (m. 1808; d. 1816); Childless (4) Caroline Augusta of Bavaria (m. 1816; w. 1835); Childless	Son of Leopold I (primogeniture)
Francis II (Francesco II); 1768–1835 (aged 67)		11 April 1814 – 7 April 1815	(1) Elisabeth of Württemberg (m. 1788; d. 1790); 1 child (Not survived to adulthood) (2) Maria Theresa of Naples and Sicily (m. 1790; d. 1807); 11 children (7 survived to adulthood) (3) Maria Ludovika of Austria-Este (m. 1808; d. 1816); Childless (4) Caroline Augusta of Bavaria (m. 1816; w. 1835); Childless	Son of Leopold I (primogeniture)
→				

== See also ==
- List of governors of the Duchy of Milan
- List of mayors of Milan
- List of consorts of Milan
- Timeline of Milan

== Bibliography ==
- Ady, Cecilia M.; Armstrong, Edward (1907). A History of Milan under the Sforza. Methuen & Co. Archived from the original on 2012-10-13 – via Questia.
- Adriano, Cappelli (1998). Cronologia Cronografia e Calendario Perpetuo. Hoepli. ISBN 88-203-2502-0.
- Baumgartner, Frederic J. (1996). St.Martin's Press (ed.). Louis XII. Palgrave Macmillan US. ISBN 0-312-12072-9.
