= Caterina Visconti =

Italian noble (1361–1404)

Catherina Visconti
- Duchess of Milan; Regent of Milan
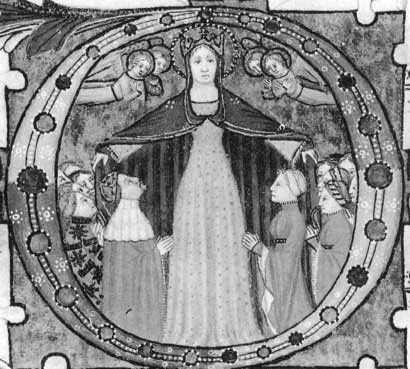
- The painted figures of Caterina and Gian Galeazzo are shown kneeling in the foreground in this missal by Anovelo da Imbonate
- Born: 1361; Milan, Italy
- Died: 17 October 1404 (aged 42–43); Castle of Monza, Italy
- Noble family: Visconti
- Spouse: Gian Galeazzo Visconti
- Issue: Gian Maria Visconti; Filippo Maria Visconti
- Father: Bernabò Visconti
- Mother: Beatrice Regina della Scala

Caterina Visconti (1361 – 17 October 1404) was Duchess of Milan as the second spouse of Gian Galeazzo Visconti, the first Duke of Milan, and was the mother of two succeeding Dukes of Milan, Gian Maria and Filippo Maria Visconti. Caterina served as Regent of Milan from 1402 to 1404, during her elder son's minority, but due to Gian Maria's suspicion of her alleged treason (planted in his mind by her enemy, the condottiero Facino Cane), he had his mother arrested and imprisoned in the castle of Monza, where she was presumably poisoned in 1404.

== Family ==
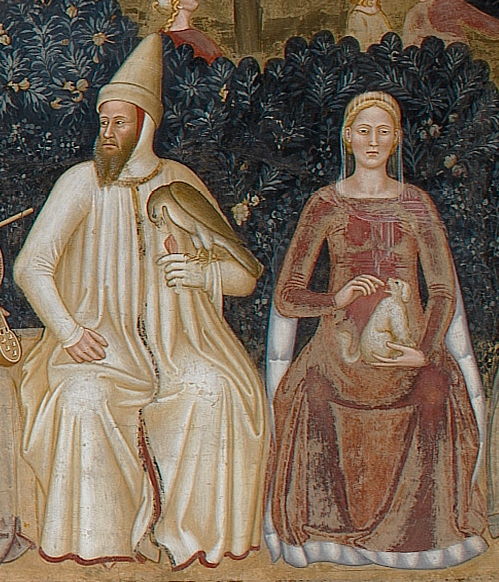
Bernabò Visconti and Beatrice Regina della Scala, the parents of Caterina Visconti

Caterina was born in Milan, one of the seventeen children of Bernabò Visconti, Lord of Milan, and Beatrice Regina della Scala. Her paternal grandparents were Stefano Visconti, Lord of Milan, and Valentina Doria, and her maternal grandparents were Mastino II della Scala and Taddea da Carrara.

Her niece, Isabeau of Bavaria, daughter of her eldest sister, Taddea, was a Queen consort of France upon her marriage in 1385 to King Charles VI. Following the murder of her maternal grandfather, Isabeau became one of the most implacable enemies of Caterina's husband Gian Galeazzo and his daughter, Valentina, Duchess of Orleans.

== Marriage ==
Early in 1379, a possible marriage was discussed between Caterina and King Richard II of England. The King's tutor and advisor, Sir Simon Burley went to Milan along with Geoffrey Chaucer to negotiate, but he had misgivings about the match. Bernabò also rejected it, as he favoured another alliance for his daughter. On 2 October 1380, in the Church of San Giovanni in Conca, at the age of about nineteen, Caterina married her first cousin, Gian Galeazzo Visconti, whose first wife Isabelle of Valois had died in 1373 in childbirth, leaving him three sons who all died young, and a daughter, Valentina Visconti, who, in 1389, married Louis, Duke of Orleans. From Isabelle, Gian Galeazzo had inherited the title of Count of Vertus in Champagne.

In 1385, Gian Galeazzo deposed Caterina's father, Bernabò as Lord of Milan. Bernabò was imprisoned at the Castle of Trezzo where he was allegedly poisoned on orders of Gian Galeazzo.

Caterina became the Duchess of Milan on 11 May 1395, when her husband was created the first duke by Wenceslaus, King of the Romans for 100,000 florins. To commemorate the event, a missal was painted by Anovelo da Imbonate, depicting, in the foreground, the kneeling figures of Caterina and Gian Galeazzo. It is now in the library of the Basilica of Sant'Ambrogio in Milan. Her husband granted her the castle of Monza and the signoria of Vicenza. Caterina and her husband commissioned the construction of the Certosa di Pavia, which began on 27 August 1396.

== Issue ==
Caterina and Gian Galeazzo had three children:

- Daughter (June 1385 – 9 July 1385).
- Gian Maria Visconti (7 September 1388 – assassinated 16 May 1412), 2nd Duke of Milan, married Antonia Malatesta, died childless.
- Filippo Maria Visconti (23 September 1392 – 13 August 1447), 3rd Duke of Milan, married Beatrice Lascaris di Tenda, widow of Facino Cane. The marriage was childless and he had her executed on charges of adultery. By his mistress, Agnese del Maino, he had a daughter, Bianca Maria Visconti, who succeeded him as Duchess of Milan.

== Regency and death ==
When Gian Galeazzo died of a fever on 3 September 1402, Caterina became regent for her son Gian Maria who was fourteen years old. The Duchy was riven by strife and numerous revolts as rival factions between Gian Galeazzo's legitimate and illegitimate heirs contested for land and power during her regency. Caterina's faction was led by Francesco Barbavara, Count of Valsesia, and a member of the regency council. The faction led by her enemy, the condottiero Facino Cane, however prevailed; thus he, along with the illegitimate sons of Gian Galeazzo, created doubts about Caterina's loyalty in her son's mind. Convinced of his mother's treachery, Gian Maria had Caterina arrested on 18 August 1404 and imprisoned in her own castle of Monza, where she died on 17 October 1404, allegedly of poisoning. She was about forty-three years old.

Her son Gian Maria was assassinated in 1412 by a group of Milanese Ghibellines. Caterina's second son Filippo Maria succeeded him as Duke of Milan.

== Sources ==
- Hoeniger, Cathleen (2006). "The Illuminated "Tacuinum sanitatis" Manuscripts from Northern Italy ca. 1380-1400: Sources, Patrons, and the Creation of a New Pictorial Genre". In Givens, Jean Ann; Reeds, Karen; Touwaide, Alain (eds.). Visualizing Medieval Medicine and Natural History, 1200-1550. Ashgate Publishing. pp. 51–82.

Preceded by Beatrice della Scala	Lady and Duchess of Milan; 1395–1402	Succeeded by Antonia Malatesta
