= Facino Cane =

Italian condottiero (1360–1412)

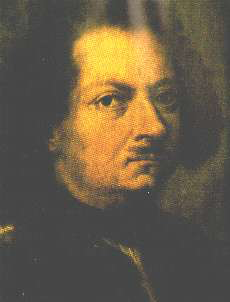
Facino Cane.

Facino Cane da Casale (1360 – 16 May 1412), born Bonifacio Cane, was an Italian condottiero.

== Biography ==
Facino Cane was born in Casale Monferrato to a noble family that produced a number of military captains and administrators. His father was Manuele, the son of Enrico Cane. Facino had younger brothers named Filippino and Marcolo. Most of the family abandoned the service of the Marquess of Montferrat for the Visconti of Milan in the early 1360s.

Facino trained in the military arts by fighting under Otto of Brunswick against Charles of Durazzo, in 1381. Taken captive, he passed into the service of Charles of Durazzo (now King Charles III of Naples), fighting against his rival, Duke Louis I of Anjou in 1382. When Charles left for Hungary in 1385, Facino returned to Northern Italy. At the age of 26, in 1386, he became condottiero for the Scaliger lord of Verona in a conflict against Padua. Taken captive by the enemy in 1387, Facino was released and entered into the service of the Carraresi lord of Padua. His unscrupulous behaviour caused a scandal, leading to his dismissal by the Carraresi in 1388. Facino now entered the service of Theodore II, Marquess of Montferrat, with 400 knights, in his war against the House of Savoy.

Facino's aim in wars was almost exclusively the enrichment of himself and his soldiers, resulting in continued savage acts of ruthlessness and cruelties against the population. This led Theodore, too, to dismiss Facino in 1397, and the condottiero returned to service with the Carraresi of Padua and then, in 1401, with the Visconti of Milan. By this time, Facino appears to have increased his wealth and following by marrying Beatrice, the daughter of a cousin, Ruggero Cane, who had been a captain in the service of the Visconti. In 1399 Facino received a small lordship centred on Borgo San Martino from the Marquis of Montferrat, before passing definitively into Visconti service, in which he was rewarded with greater lordship. By 1404 his personal dominions included Alessandria, Novara and Tortona.

After the deaths of Duke Gian Galeazzo Visconti in 1402 and of his widow Caterina Visconti in 1404, Facino largely assumed the effective control of the Duchy of Milan for their young sons Gian Maria Visconti, the new duke of Milan, and Filippo Maria Visconti, the ruler of Pavia. On 24 January 1406, Facino was invested as Count of Biandrate by Filippo Maria Visconti, in the presence of the Marquess of Montferrat. The new count of Biandrate was subsequently occupied with the Visconti's conflict with the Malatesta. In January 1412, Facino set out on a campaign against Pandolfo III Malatesta of Fano. Despite initial success, Facino suffered from an acute attack of gout and had to be carried back to Pavia. As Facino lay dying, Duke Gian Maria Visconti was murdered in Milan; one of Facino's last acts is said to have been to urge all to swear loyalty to Filippo Maria as his brother's successors.

Facino died at Pavia on 16 May 1412, leaving no children. His widow Beatrice married Duke Filippo Maria Visconti, who therefore inherited the cities, the treasure and the soldiers of Facino. Facino's younger brother Filippino inherited the County of Biandrate.
