= Gian Maria Visconti =

Duke of Milan (1388–1412)

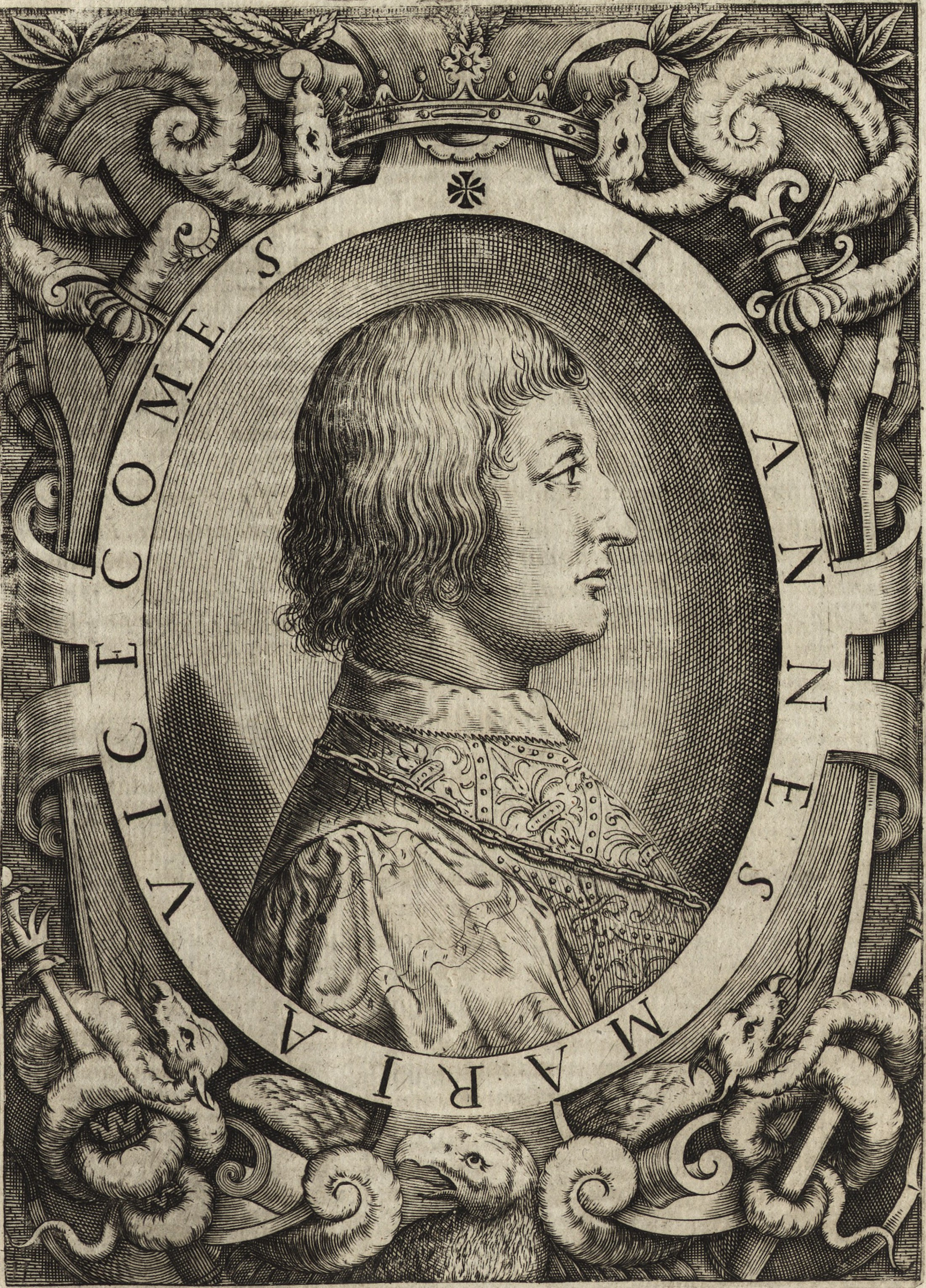

Duke of Milan
- Reign: 3 September 1402 – 16 May 1412
- Predecessor: Gian Galeazzo
- Successor: Filippo Maria
- Born: 7 September 1388; Abbiategrasso
- Died: 16 May 1412 (aged 23); Milan
- Spouse: Antonia Malatesta of Cesena
- House: Visconti
- Father: Gian Galeazzo Visconti
- Mother: Caterina Visconti

Gian Maria Visconti (or Giovanni Maria; 7 September 1388 – 16 May 1412) was the second Visconti Duke of Milan, the son of Gian Galeazzo Visconti and Caterina Visconti. He was viewed as cruel and was eventually assassinated. He had no children.

== Biography ==
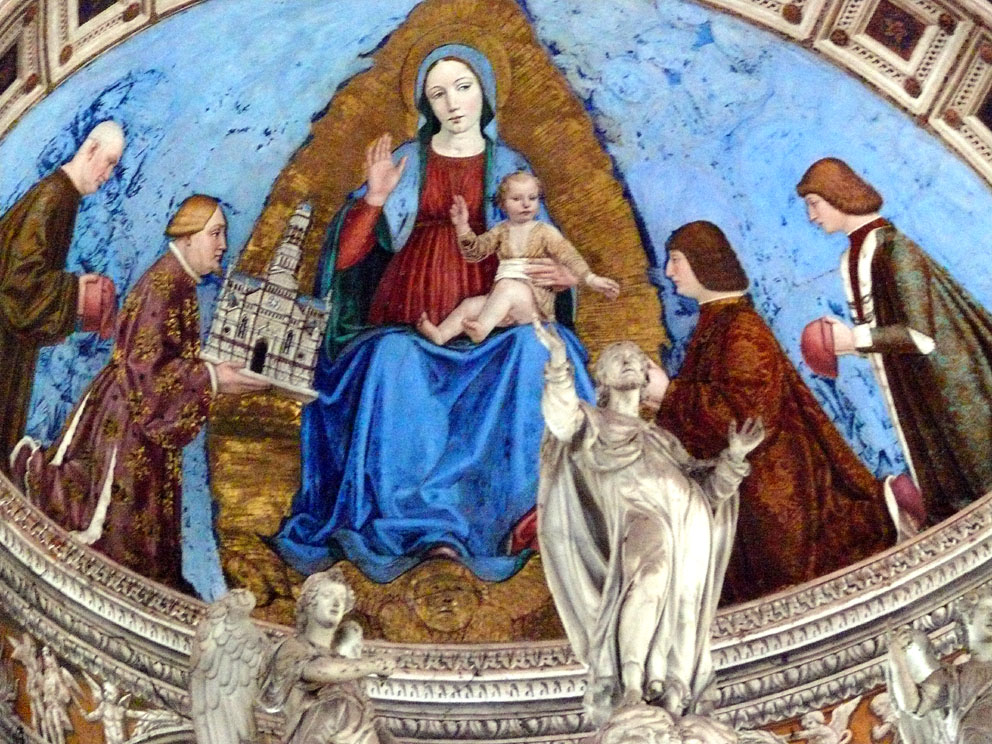
Gian Galeazzo Visconti, with his three sons, presents a model of the Certosa di Pavia to the Virgin (Certosa di Pavia).

Born in 1388 in Abbiategrasso at the Visconti castle, Gian Maria was the son of Gian Galeazzo and his wife Caterina, daughter of Bernabò Visconti. They had been married since 1380 but had only managed to give birth to one child who had died a month after its birth. Gian's birth was met with celebration as the long-awaited son and heir.

His parents had even made a vow to add the unisex name "Maria" – usually considered a feminine name – to their sons' names if the Virgin Mary would grant them children, hence he was named Gian Maria. The Basilica church (dedicated to the Nativity of St. Mary), Santa Maria Nuova in Abbiategrasso, was built to celebrate the birth of Gian Maria.

Gian Maria's birth helped cement his father's rule over Milan. Gian Galeazzo, while admittedly a Visconti - the family who had ruled over Milan since 1277- had gained control over Milan after overthrowing, imprisoning and poisoning his predecessor and uncle, Bernabò Visconti and his two eldest sons.

Following his father's death from the plague in 1402, the 13-year-old Gian Maria assumed the title of duke under his mother's regency. The Duchy of Milan soon disintegrated: among the various parties contending for its lands, the condottiero Facino Cane prevailed. In 1408, Gian Maria married Antonia Malatesta of Cesena, daughter of Andrea Malatesta. They had no issue.

A plot by a party of Milanese Ghibellines was raised against the Duke when Facino Cane was terminally ill in Pavia, and Gian Maria was assassinated in front of the church of San Gottardo in Milan. The dying Facino had his officers swear to support Filippo Maria, Gian Maria's brother, who in fact succeeded him.

== In literature ==
- Bellarion, by Raphael Sabatini

== Sources ==
- Bartlett, Kenneth (2019). The Renaissance in Italy: A History. Hackett Publishing. ISBN 978-1-62466-820-3.
- Hoeniger, Cathleen (2006). "The Illuminated "Tacuinum sanitatis" Manuscripts from Northern Italy ca. 1380-1400: Sources, Patrons, and the Creation of a New Pictorial Genre". In Givens, Jean Ann; Reeds, Karen; Touwaide, Alain (eds.). Visualizing Medieval Medicine and Natural History, 1200-1550. Ashgate Publishing. pp. 51–82.
- Jones, P.J. (1974). The Malatesta of Rimini and the Papal State. Cambridge University Press.
- Lubkin, Gregory (1994). A Renaissance Court: Milan under Galleazzo Maria Sforza. University of California Press.
- Pfeffer, Wendy, ed. (2022). Blandin de Cornoalha, A Comic Occitan Romance. Translated by Burrell, Margaret; Pfeffer, Wendy. Medieval Institute Publications. ISBN 978-1-58044-525-2.
- Welch, Evelyn (2010). "Patrons, Artists, and Audiences in Renaissance Milan, 1300-1600". In Rosenberg, Charles M. (ed.). The Court Cities of Northern Italy: Milan, Parma, Piacenza, Mantua, Ferrara, Bologna, Urbino, Pesaro, and Rimini. Cambridge University Press. pp. 21–70.

Italian nobility
Preceded by Gian Galeazzo Visconti	Duke of Milan; 1402–1412	Succeeded by Filippo Maria Visconti
