= Gian Galeazzo Visconti =

First duke of Milan (1351–1402)

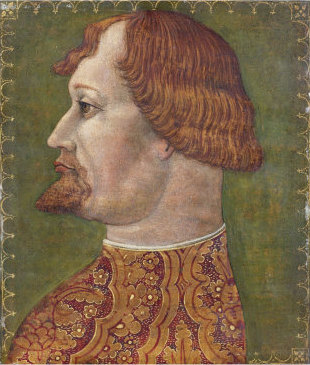

Duke of Milan
- Reign: 5 September 1395 – 3 September 1402
- Coronation: 5 September 1395, Basilica of Sant'Ambrogio
- Successor: Gian Maria Visconti

Lord of Pavia
- Reign: 4 August 1378 – 5 September 1395
- Predecessor: Galeazzo II Visconti

Lord of Milan
- Reign: 6 May 1385 – 5 September 1395
- Predecessor: Bernabò Visconti

Lord of Pisa
- Reign: 13 February 1399 – 3 September 1402
- Predecessor: Gherardo Appiani
- Successor: Gabriele Maria Visconti
- Born: 16 October 1351; Pavia, Italy
- Died: 3 September 1402 (aged 50); Melegnano, Duchy of Milan, Italy
- Burial: Certosa di Pavia
- Spouse: Isabella, Countess of Vertus (m. 1360; died 1372) Caterina Visconti (m. 1380; died 1402)
- Issue: Valentina, Countess of Vertus; Giovanni Maria, Duke of Milan; Filippo Maria, Duke of Milan; Illegitimate: Gabriele Maria Visconti, Lord of Pisa; Antonio Visconti
- House: Visconti
- Father: Galeazzo II Visconti
- Mother: Bianca of Savoy

Gian Galeazzo Visconti (16 October 1351 – 3 September 1402), was the first duke of Milan (1395) (Note: He was also Signore di Verona, Cremona, Bergamo, Brescia, Belluno, Pieve di Cadore, Feltre, Pavia, Novara, Como, Lodi, Vercelli, Alba, Asti, Pontremoli, Tortona, Alessandria, Valenza, Piacenza, Parma, Reggio Emilia, Vicenza, Vigevano, Borgo San Donnino and of the valli del Boite.) and ruled that late-medieval city just before the dawn of the Renaissance. He also ruled Lombardy jointly with his uncle Bernabò. He was the founding patron of the Certosa di Pavia, completing the Visconti Castle at Pavia begun by his father and furthering work on the Duomo of Milan. He conquered a large area in the Po Valley of northern Italy. He threatened war with France in relation to the transfer of Genoa to French control as well as issues with his beloved daughter Valentina. When he died of fever in the Castello of Melegnano, his children fought with each other and fragmented the territories that he had ruled.

== Biography ==
Gian Galeazzo was the son of Galeazzo II Visconti and Bianca of Savoy. His father possessed the signoria of the city of Pavia. In 1385, Gian Galeazzo gained control of Milan by overthrowing his uncle Bernabò through treacherous means: by faking a religious conversion and ambushing him during a religious procession in Milan. He imprisoned Bernabò, who soon died, supposedly poisoned on his orders.

After seizing Milan, he took Verona, Vicenza, and Padua, establishing himself as Signore of each, and soon controlled almost the entire Po Valley, including Piacenza. There in 1393, he gave the feudal power to the Confalonieri family on the lands they already had in the valleys around Piacenza. He lost Padua in 1390 when it reverted to Francesco Novello da Carrara. He received the title of Duke of Milan from Wenceslaus, King of the Romans in 1395 for 100,000 florins.

Gian Galeazzo spent 300,000 golden florins in attempting to turn from their courses the rivers Mincio from Mantua and the Brenta from Padua, in order to render those cities helpless before the force of his arms.

His residence, the Castello in Pavia, was the grandest princely dwelling in Italy. To its notable library, he added scientific treatises and richly illuminated manuscripts, many of them the fruits of his conquests.

In 1400, Gian Galeazzo appointed a host of clerks and departments entrusted with improving public health. For the new system of administration and bookkeeping this established, he is credited with creating an efficient and innovative bureaucracy, with the assistance of his Chancellor Francesco Barbavara.

=== Conflict with France ===
Furious at French political manoeuvring that had removed Genoa from his influence, Gian Galeazzo sought to prevent France from gaining sovereignty there. King Charles VI of France sent Enguerrand VII de Coucy to warn Gian Galeazzo that France would consider further interference a hostile act.

The quarrel was more than political. Gian Galeazzo was a devoted father to his daughter Valentina Visconti, Duchess of Orléans. Charles VI was married to Isabeau of Bavaria, granddaughter of Bernabò Visconti, a bitter enemy of Valentina and her father. Queen Isabeau's faction spread rumours that Valentina had an affair with Charles and that she was responsible for his mental breakdowns. Due to these machinations, Valentina was exiled from Paris in 1396, the same month as a French Crusade army departed for Hungary.

Gian Galeazzo reacted to the mistreatment of Valentina by threatening to declare war on France.

After the French-led Crusade met disaster at Nicopolis, Gian Galeazzo was strongly suspected of having informed the Turks of the Crusaders' strength and plans.

=== Uniting Italy and death ===
Gian Galeazzo had dreams of uniting all of northern Italy into one kingdom, a revived Lombard empire. Obstacles included Bologna and especially Florence, which joined with other local potentates in the League of Bologna. In 1402, Gian Galeazzo launched assaults upon these cities. The warfare was extremely costly on both sides, but it was universally believed the Milanese would emerge victorious. Florentine leaders, especially the chancellor Coluccio Salutati, worked successfully to rally the people of Florence, but the Florentines were being taxed hard by famine, disease, and poverty. Galeazzo won another victory over the Bolognese at the Battle of Casalecchio on 26–27 June 1402.

Galeazzo's dreams were to come to nought, however, as he succumbed to a fever at the Castello of Melegnano on 10 August 1402. He died on 3 September. His empire fragmented as infighting among his successors wrecked Milan, partly through the division of his lands among both legitimate and illegitimate children. (Note: To his son Giovanni Maria he assigned the title of Duke of Milan, which included Como, Lodi, Cremona, Bergamo, Brescia, Reggio Emilia, Piacenza, Parma, and claims to Perugia and Siena. To Filippo Maria, conte di Pavia, he assigned in addition Vercelli, Novara, Alessandria, Tortona, Feltre, Verona, Vicenza, Bassano and the shores of Trento. To his illegitimate son, Gabriele Maria, went Pisa and Crema.)

== Marriage and issue ==
His first marriage was to Isabelle of Valois, who brought him the title of comte de Vertus in Champagne, rendered in Italian as Conte di Virtù, the title by which he was known in his early career. They had:

- Gian Galeazzo (b. Pavia, 4 March 1366 – d. bef. 1376).
- Azzone (b. Pavia, 1368 – d. Pavia, 4 October 1381).
- Valentina (b. Pavia, 1371 – d. Château de Blois, Loir-et-Cher, 14 December 1408), married on 17 August 1389 to Louis I, Duke of Orléans
- Carlo (b. Pavia, 11 September 1372 – d. Pavia, 1374).

After Galeazzo's wife Isabelle died in childbirth in 1372, he married secondly, on 2 October 1380, his cousin Caterina Visconti, daughter of Bernabò; with her he had:

- Gian Maria (7 September 1388 – 16 May 1412)
- Filippo Maria (3 September 1392 – 13 August 1447).

== Gallery ==
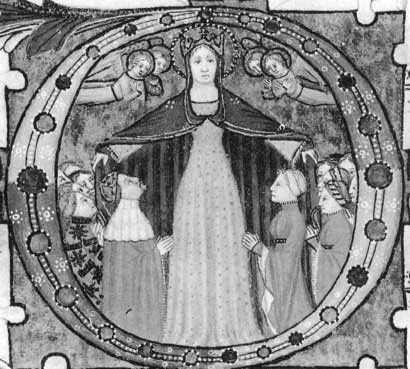
The painted figures of Caterina and Gian Galeazzo are shown kneeling in the foreground in this missal by Anovelo da Imbonate

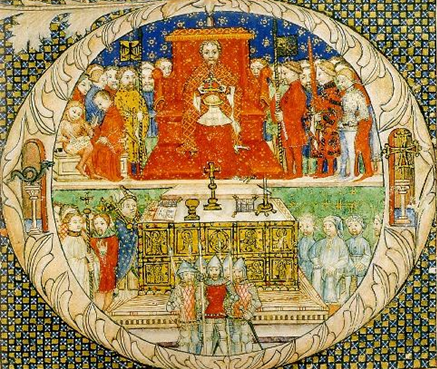
The Coronation of Gian Galeazzo Visconti in the Basilica of Sant'Ambrogio

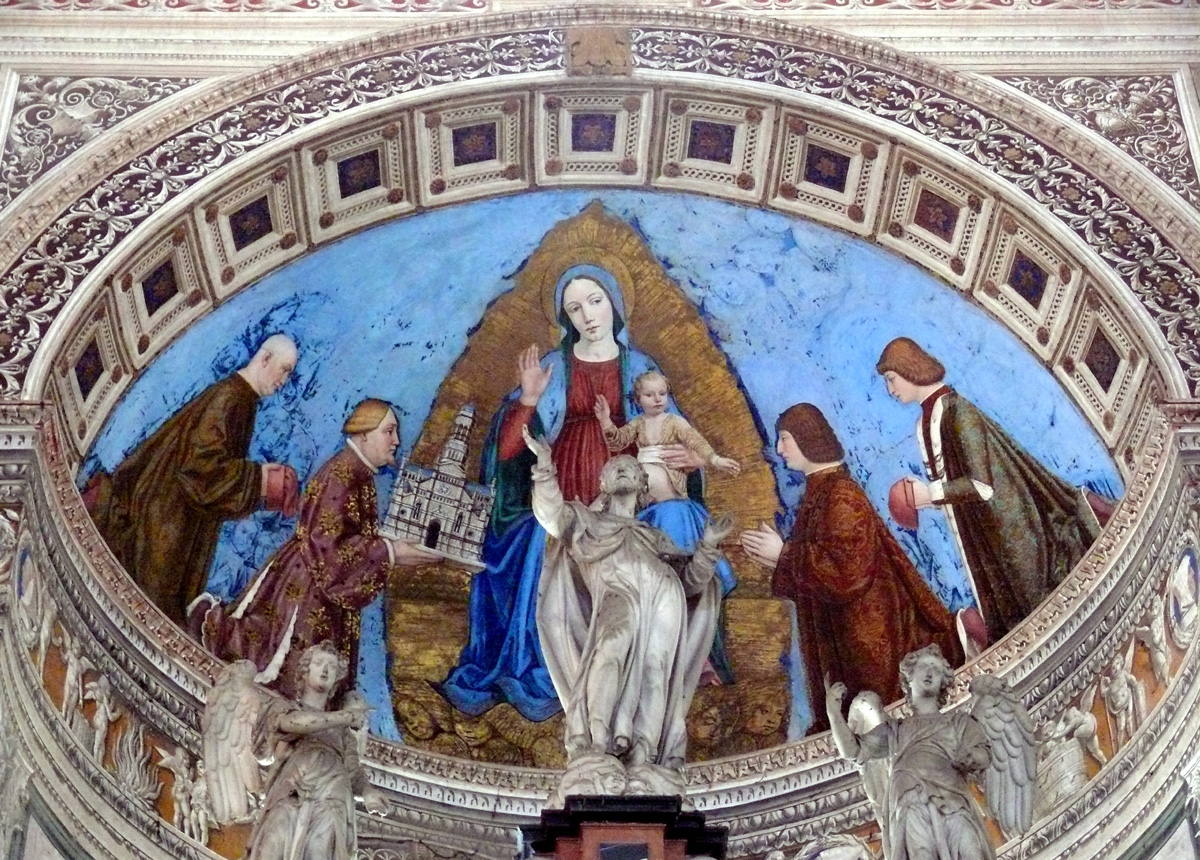
Gian Galeazzo Visconti, with his three sons, presents the Certosa di Pavia to the Virgin (Certosa di Pavia)

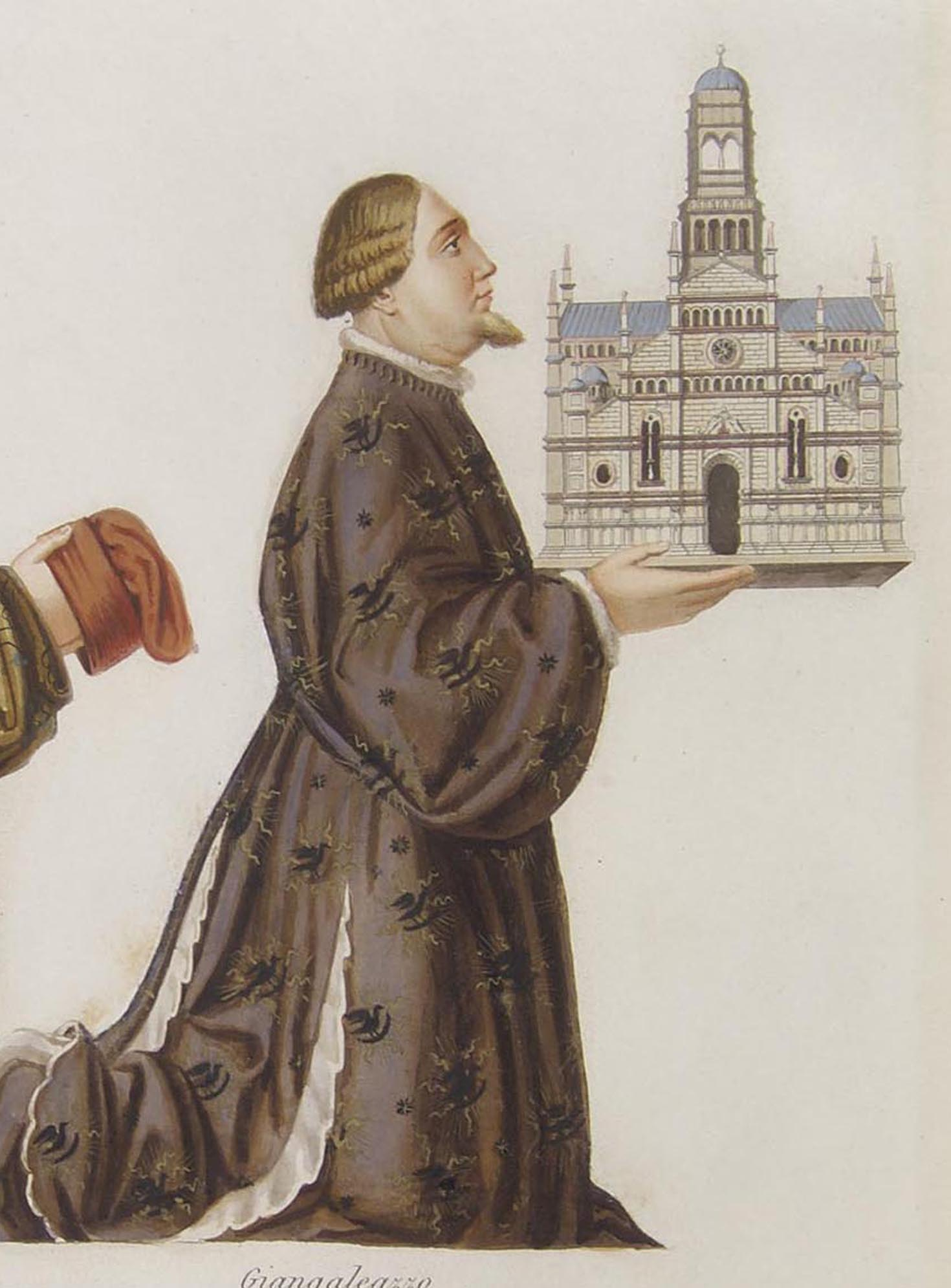
Detail from Gian Galeazzo donates the Certosa to the Madonna

Tomb of Gian Galeazzo Visconti at the Certosa di Pavia

== See also ==
- Montechino Italian Castle Piacenza

== Sources ==
- Bueno de Mesquita, D. M. (Daniel Meredith) (2011) [1941]. Giangaleazzo Visconti, Duke of Milan (1351-1402): A Study in the Political Career of an Italian Despot (reprint ed.). Cambridge, UK: Cambridge University Press. ISBN 9780521234559. OCLC 746456124.
- Morelli, Giovanni Di Paolo (2015). "Memoirs". In Branca, Vitorre (ed.). Merchant Writers: Florentine Memoirs from the Middle Ages and Renaissance. University of Toronto Press.
- Mueller, Reinhold C. (2019). The Venetian Money Market: Banks, Panics, and the Public Debt, 1200-1500. The Johns Hopkins University Press.
- Ward, A.W.; Prothero, G.W.; Leathes, Stanley, eds. (1934). The Cambridge Modern History. Vol. XIII. Cambridge at the University Press.
- Welch, Evelyn (2010). "Patrons, Artists, and Audiences in Renaissance Milan, 1300-1600". In Rosenberg, Charles M. (ed.). The Court Cities of Northern Italy: Milan, Parma, Piacenza, Mantua, Ferrara, Bologna, Urbino, Pesaro, and Rimini. Cambridge University Press. pp. 21–70.

Italian nobility
Preceded by Galeazzo II Visconti; Bernabò Visconti	Lord of Milan; 1378–1395	Became duke
New creation	Duke of Milan; 1395–1402	Succeeded by Gian Maria Visconti
