= Filippo Maria Visconti =

Duke of Milan (1392–1447)

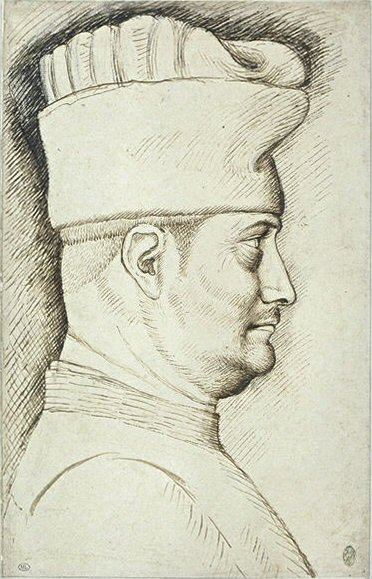
- Portrait of Filippo Maria Visconti preparatory drawing by Pisanello for the commemorative medal of the Duke

Duke of Milan
- Reign: 16 May 1412 - 13 August 1447
- Predecessor: Gian Maria
- Successor: Ambrosian Republic
- Born: 3 September 1392; Milan
- Died: 13 August 1447 (aged 54); Milan
- Spouse: Beatrice Cane; Marie of Savoy
- Issue: Bianca Maria, Duchess of Milan (illegitimate); Caterina (illegitimate)
- House: Visconti
- Father: Gian Galeazzo Visconti
- Mother: Caterina Visconti

Filippo Maria Visconti (3 September 1392 – 13 August 1447) was the Duke of Milan from 1412 until his death in 1447.

In the 1420s, he engaged in conflict with Romagna, Florence, and Venice during the Wars in Lombardy, but was eventually compelled to surrender under pressure from Pope Martin V. He later returned to war, which ended with another peace agreement.

Visconti married twice; his second marriage, in 1428, was to Marie of Savoy, daughter of his ally Amadeus VIII, Duke of Savoy. At his death in 1447, Visconti was the last male of the Visconti line. He was succeeded by Francesco Sforza, who had married Bianca Maria Visconti, his illegitimate daughter by Agnese del Maino.

== Biography ==
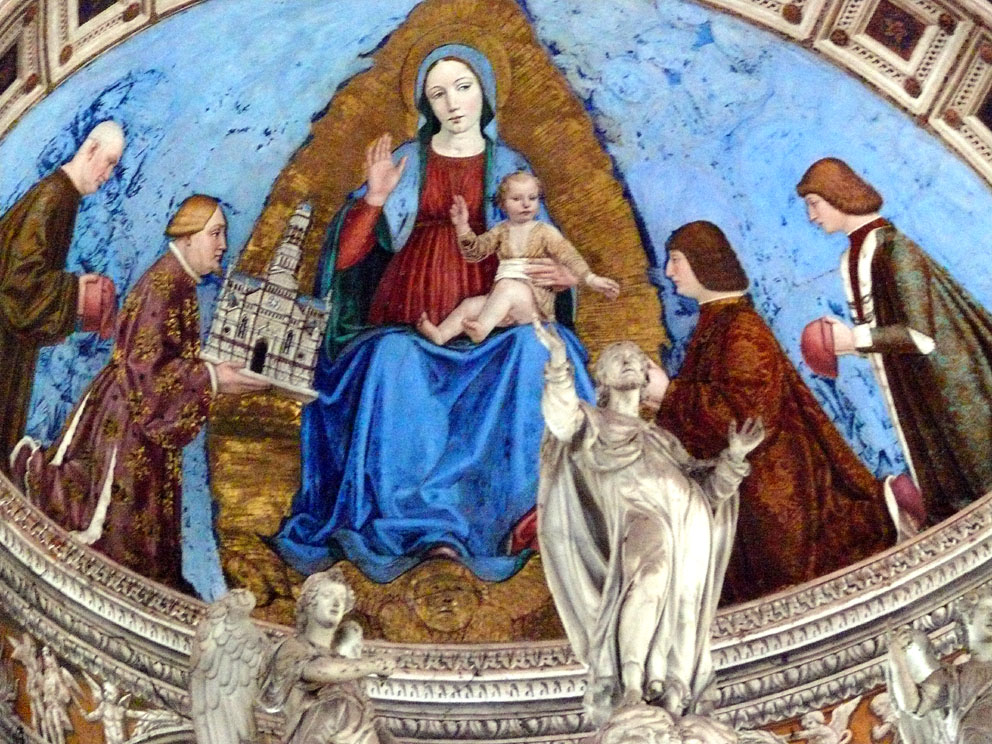
Gian Galeazzo Visconti, with his three sons, presents a model of the Certosa di Pavia to the Virgin (Certosa di Pavia).

Filippo Maria Visconti was born on 3 September 1392, the son of Gian Galeazzo Visconti and Caterina Visconti. When his father died of plague in 1402, his elder brother Gian Maria became Duke of Milan, with their mother Caterina acting in support of her son. Gian Maria, however, came under the influence of his advisers and came to regard his mother as a threat. On 18 August 1404, he had her imprisoned at Monza, where she died on 17 October 1404; her death was rumoured to have been caused by poison.

Following the assassination of Gian Maria on 16 May 1412, and of the condottiero Facino Cane, Filippo Maria allied himself with Cane's widow, Beatrice Cane. Through this alliance, he gained access to her late husband's wealth and armies, enabling him to consolidate his authority in Milan. Filippo Maria succeeded his brother as Duke of Milan and established his rule over Pavia.

As the son of Gian Galeazzo Visconti, who had earlier usurped power by deposing and killing his uncle and father-in-law Bernabò Visconti, Filippo Maria's succession was contested. Opposition came from his uncle Estorre Visconti (Note: Capponi refers to Estorre Visconti as Filippo's cousin.) and cousin Giacomo (Giancarlo) Visconti, an illegitimate son and legitimate grandson of Bernabò. With the support of the Milanese population, they briefly assumed control of Milan following Gian Maria's death, but on 16 June 1412, Filippo Maria retook the city.

That same year, he confiscated properties of the Scotti family, including Agazzano Castle. Filippo Maria had married Beatrice Lascaris di Tenda, Countess of Biandrate and widow of Facino Cane. The marriage brought him a dowry of 500,000 florins, but when Beatrice became active in state affairs, he accused her of adultery and had her executed at the Castle of Binasco in 1418.

By employing prominent condottieri such as Francesco Bussone da Carmagnola, Niccolò Piccinino—whose forces fought at the Battle of Anghiari in 1440—and later Francesco Sforza, he was able to recover much of the Lombard territory of his father's duchy.

After the death of Giorgio Ordelaffi, lord of Forlì, Filippo Maria assumed guardianship of his heir Tebaldo Ordelaffi. He used this position to attempt expansion into Romagna in 1423, provoking conflict with Florence. In 1425, Venice, persuaded by Carmagnola, intervened on Florence's side and the war spread to Lombardy. In March 1426, Carmagnola incited riots in Brescia, which he had earlier captured for Milan. After a prolonged campaign, Venice conquered Brescia, extending its mainland territory to Lake Garda. Filippo Maria sought support from the Holy Roman Emperor, but was forced to accept peace terms imposed by Pope Martin V, which favoured Venice. Dissatisfied, he soon resumed hostilities, but was defeated at Maclodio on 12 October 1427. A more durable peace was later signed at Ferrara, mediated by Niccolò III d'Este, Marquis of Ferrara.

In 1428, Filippo Maria married his second wife, Marie of Savoy, daughter of Amadeus VIII of Savoy, an ally. With Visconti's support, Amadeus later reigned as Antipope Felix V from November 1439 to April 1449.

Filippo Maria also patronised scholarship. He invited the humanist Gasparino Barzizza to Milan, where Barzizza founded a school and served as court orator.

Filippo Maria died on 13 August 1447. He was the last of the male line of the Visconti family. After a brief republican experiment known as the Ambrosian republic, the duchy passed to Francesco Sforza (1401–1466). Sforza had married Filippo Maria's only child, Bianca Maria Visconti (1425–1468), born of his mistress Agnese del Maino (1401–1465).

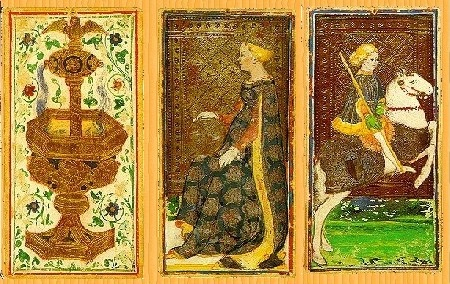
Visconti-Sforza tarot deck.

== Art ==
The oldest surviving tarot decks, known at the time as carte da trionfi, were likely commissioned by Filippo Maria Visconti.

== See also ==
- Montechino Castle
- Wars in Lombardy
- Vincenzo Bellini's 1833 opera Beatrice di Tenda

== Sources ==
- Black, Jane (2009). Absolutism in Renaissance Milan: Plenitude of Power under the Visconti and the Sforza, 1329-1535. Oxford University Press. ISBN 978-0-19-160988-6.
- Capponi, Niccolo (2015). The Day the Renaissance Was Saved: The Battle of Anghiari and da Vinci's Lost Masterpiece. Melville House. ISBN 978-1-61219-461-5.
- Ettlinger, Helen S. (1994). "Visibilis et Invisibilis: The Mistress in Italian Renaissance Court Society". Renaissance Quarterly. 47 (4 (Winter)): 770–792. doi:10.2307/2863216. JSTOR 2863216.
- Ianziti, Gary (2016). "Pier Candido Decembrio and the Suetonian Path to Princely Biography". In Helmrath, Johannes; Priesterjahn, Maike; Baker, Patrick; Kaiser, Ronny (eds.). Portraying the Prince in the Renaissance: The Humanist Depiction of Rulers in Historiographical and Biographical Texts. De Gruyter. ISBN 9783110473377.
- Marina, Areli (2013). "The Langobard Revival of Matteo il Magno Visconti, Lord of Milan". I Tatti Studies in the Italian Renaissance. 16 (1/2 September). University of Chicago Press: 377–414. doi:10.1086/673405. S2CID 194035594.
- Wilkins, David G.; Wilkins, Rebecca L. (1996). The Search for a Patron in the Middle Ages and the Renaissance. E. Mellen Press.
- Rondinini, Gigliola Soldi (1997). "FILIPPO MARIA Visconti, duca di Milano". Dizionario Biografico degli Italiani (in Italian).

Italian nobility
Preceded by Gian Maria Visconti	Duke of Milan; 1412–1447	Vacant Ambrosian Republic Title next held by Francesco I Sforza
