= Bona Sforza =

Queen of Poland and Grand Duchess of Lithuania from 1518 to 1548

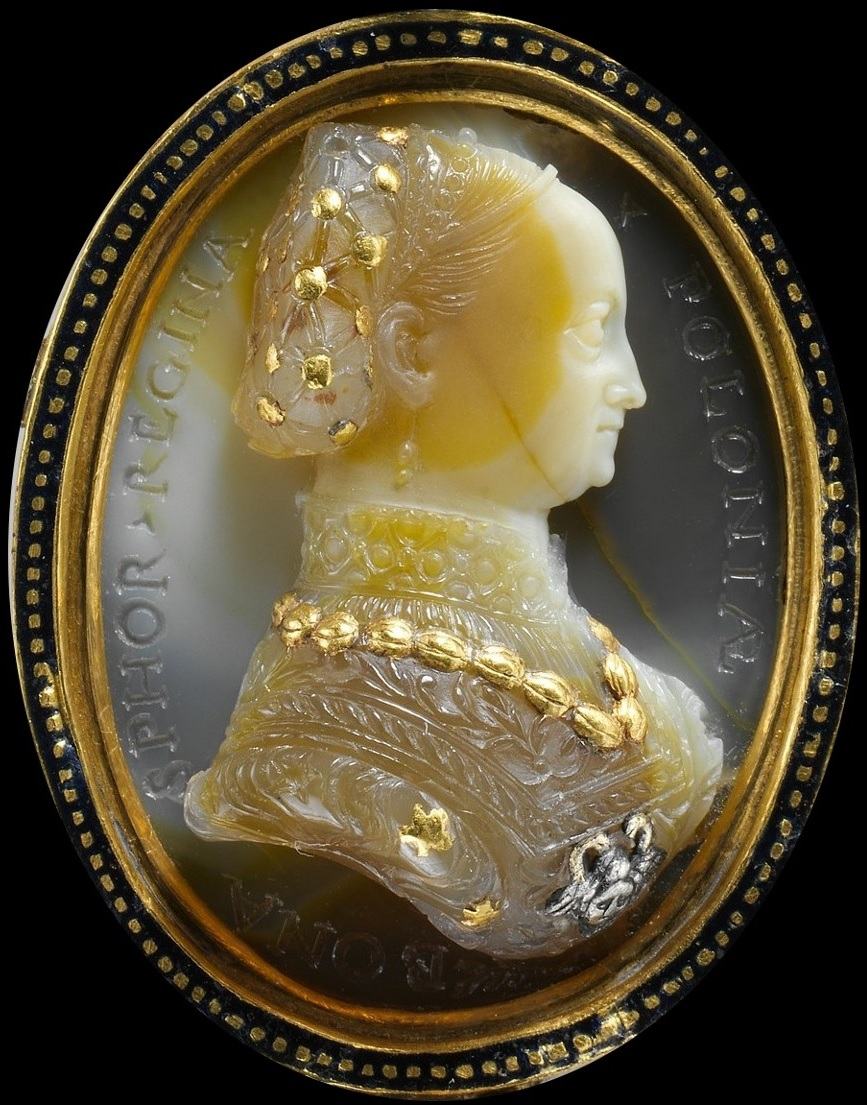
- Cameo with bust of Bona Sforza, c. 1540

Queen consort of Poland Grand Duchess consort of Lithuania
- Tenure: 18 April 1518 – 1 April 1548
- Coronation: 18 April 1518; Kraków, Poland

Duchess regnant of Bari
- Tenure: 11 February 1524 – 19 November 1557
- Predecessor: Isabella
- Successor: None (annexed by Naples)
- Born: 2 February 1494; Vigevano, Duchy of Milan
- Died: 19 November 1557 (aged 63); Bari, Kingdom of Naples
- Burial: Basilica di San Nicola
- Spouse: Sigismund I the Old (m. 1517; died 1548)
- Issue: Isabella, Queen of Hungary; Sigismund II Augustus; Sophia, Duchess of Brunswick-Lüneburg; Anna, Queen of Poland; Catherine, Queen of Sweden; Albertus, Prince of Poland
- House: Sforza
- Father: Gian Galeazzo Sforza
- Mother: Isabella of Aragon

Bona Sforza (2 February 1494 – 19 November 1557) was Queen of Poland and Grand Duchess of Lithuania as the second wife of Sigismund I the Old, and Duchess of Bari and Rossano in her own right. She was a surviving member of the powerful House of Sforza, which had ruled the Duchy of Milan since 1450.

Smart, energetic and ambitious, Bona became heavily involved in the political and cultural life of the Polish–Lithuanian union. To increase state revenue during the Chicken War, she implemented various economic and agricultural reforms, including the far-reaching Volok Reform in the Grand Duchy of Lithuania. In foreign policy, she allied with the Ottoman Empire and sometimes opposed the Habsburgs. Her descendants became beneficiaries of the Neapolitan sums, a loan to Philip II of Spain that was never completely paid.

== Childhood ==
Bona was born on 2 February 1494, in Vigevano, Milan, as the third of the four children of Gian Galeazzo Sforza, the legal heir to the Duchy of Milan, and Isabella of Naples, daughter of King Alfonso II of Naples from the House of Trastámara. Her paternal great-uncle Ludovico Sforza, known to history as "Il Moro", usurped her father's power and sent the small family to live at the Castello Visconteo in Pavia, where her father died the same year she was born. Rumours spread that he was poisoned by Ludovico.

Bona's family moved to the Sforza Castle in Milan, where they lived under the watchful eye of Ludovico, who was afraid that Milan residents would rebel and install her popular brother Francesco. To minimise the risk, Ludovico separated the boy from the family and granted Bari and Rossano to her mother. The plans were interrupted by the Italian War of 1499–1504. King Louis XII of France deposed Ludovico and took Francesco to Paris. With nothing left in Milan, her remaining family departed for Naples in February 1500. However, the war reached the Kingdom of Naples and her maternal great-uncle, King Frederick of Naples, was deposed. Together with other relatives, Bona was temporarily hidden at the Aragonese Castle on Ischia.

By January 1512, Bona was the only surviving of her siblings. She and her mother settled at the Castello Normanno-Svevo in Bari more permanently, where Bona started an excellent education. Her teachers included Italian humanists Crisostomo Colonna and Antonio de Ferraris, who taught her mathematics, natural science, geography, history, law, Latin, classical literature, theology, and how to play several musical instruments.

== Marriage proposals ==
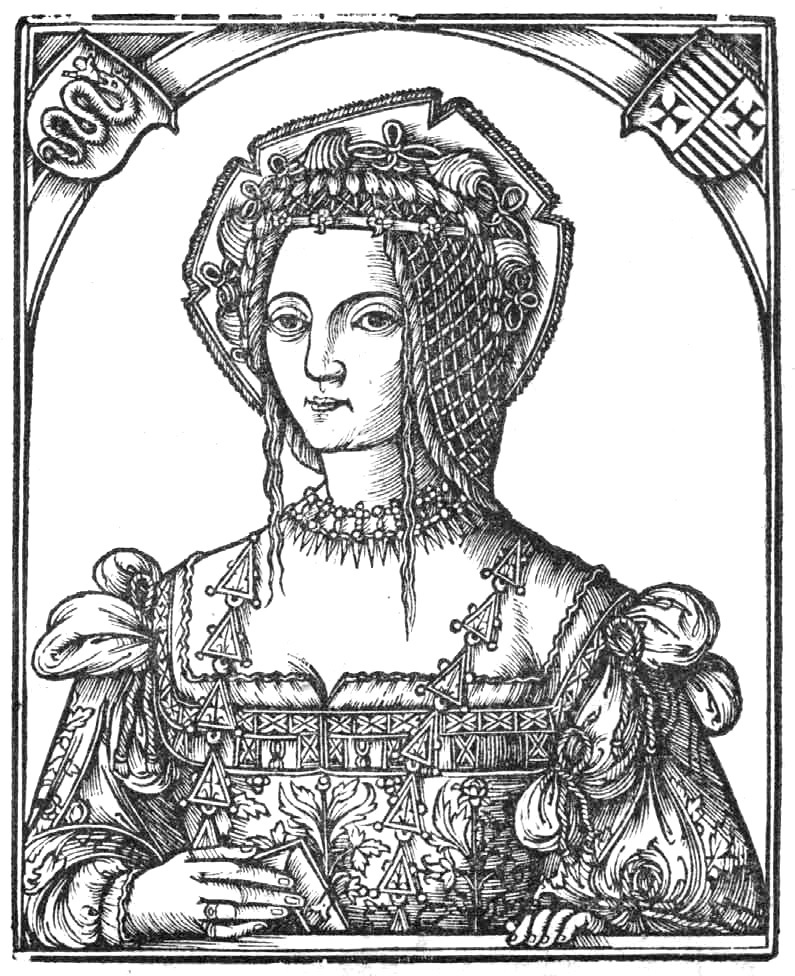
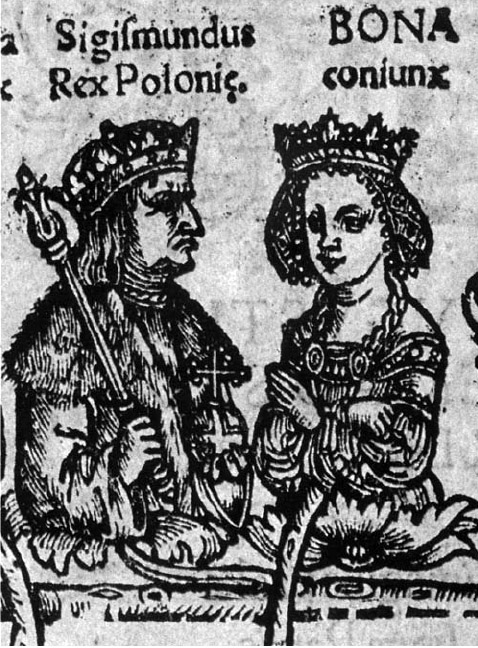
Bona portrayed in 1517 (left) and with her husband Sigismund I the Old in 1521 (right).

When the House of Sforza was restored to the Duchy of Milan in 1512, Isabella hoped to wed Bona and Duke Maximilian Sforza, thereby providing further legitimacy to Maximilian's reign. There were other proposals as well: Spanish King Ferdinand II of Aragon proposed Giuliano de' Medici, brother of Pope Leo X. Isabella counter-proposed Ferdinand's 10-year-old grandson Ferdinand of Austria; Pope Leo X proposed Philippe, Duke of Nemours, who would succeed to the Duchy of Savoy if his brother Charles III abdicated. The initial and most likely plan to marry Maximilian Sforza failed after he was deposed after the French victory in the Battle of Marignano in 1515. Pope Leo X proposed his nephew Lorenzo de' Medici, Duke of Urbino, as he hoped to install Lorenzo as Duke of Milan by using Bona's inheritance claims. However, the French hold on Milan was too strong and the plan failed.

After Polish King Sigismund I the Old was widowed in October 1515, Maximilian I, Holy Roman Emperor did not want Sigismund to marry another Habsburg opponent like his late wife, Barbara Zápolya. Therefore, the Emperor acted quickly and selected three suitable candidates for Sigismund: his granddaughter Eleanor of Austria, widowed Queen Joanna of Castile, and Bona Sforza. Although 36-year-old Joanna was eliminated because of her age, and Eleanor's older brother instead selected King Manuel I of Portugal for her husband, Polish nobles suggested Anna Radziwiłł, the widow of Konrad III of Masovia. Isabella sent Bona's old teacher, Crisostomo Colonna, and diplomat Sigismund von Herberstein to Vilnius to convince Sigismund to select Bona. They succeeded and the marriage treaty was signed in September 1517 in Vienna. Bona's dowry was very large: 100,000 ducats, personal items worth 50,000 ducats and the Duchy of Bari. In exchange, Sigismund granted his future wife the towns of Nowy Korczyn, Wiślica, Żarnów, Radomsko, Jedlnia, Kozienice, Chęciny, and Inowrocław.

Jan Konarski, Archbishop of Kraków, travelled to Bari to bring Bona to Poland. The wedding per procura took place on 6 December 1517 in Naples. Bona wore a dress of light blue Venetian satin that reportedly cost 7,000 ducats. The journey to Poland took more than three months. Bona and Sigismund met for the first time on 15 April 1518 just outside Kraków.

== Queen of Poland and Grand Duchess of Lithuania ==
The wedding and coronation took place on 18 April 1518, but celebrations continued for a week. Almost from the beginning of her life in Poland, the energetic queen tried to gain a strong political position and began forming a circle of supporters. On 23 January 1519, Pope Leo X, whom Bona had friendly relationship with from her Italian days, granted her the privilege of awarding eight benefices in five Polish cathedrals (Kraków, Gniezno, Poznań, Włocławek, and Frombork).

In May 1519, the privilege was expanded to fifteen benefices. This was a very important privilege that allowed her to secure the support of various officials. Three of her most trusted supporters, Piotr Kmita Sobieński, Andrzej Krzycki, and Piotr Gamrat, were sometimes known as the Triumvirate. She became openly involved in various state affairs, which did not agree with the traditional ideal of a royal wife using discreet manipulation in government. Although the royal couple disagreed on many domestic and foreign issues, the marriage was a supportive and successful partnership.

=== Accident in Niepołomice ===
During the first decade of her marriage, Bona gave birth to six children. While pregnant with the youngest, reportedly in the fifth month of gestation, the Queen injured herself during an escape on horseback at a bear hunt in Niepołomice Forest and gave birth prematurely. Historian Małgorzata Duczmal speculates that the pregnancy could have been more advanced, given that the child was born alive and did not die immediately. The Prince was baptised and given a name that presumably was Albertus, though he is also referred to in texts as "Adalbertus", as those two names were sometimes used interchangeably in the 16th century. Doctors were unable to save the boy, who died the same day, either of premature birth or injuries inflicted upon him during the accident.

The incident that had caused preterm labour rendered Bona unable to have other children, and left Albertus's father and older brother as the last male members of the Jagiellonian dynasty.

=== Domestic policy ===
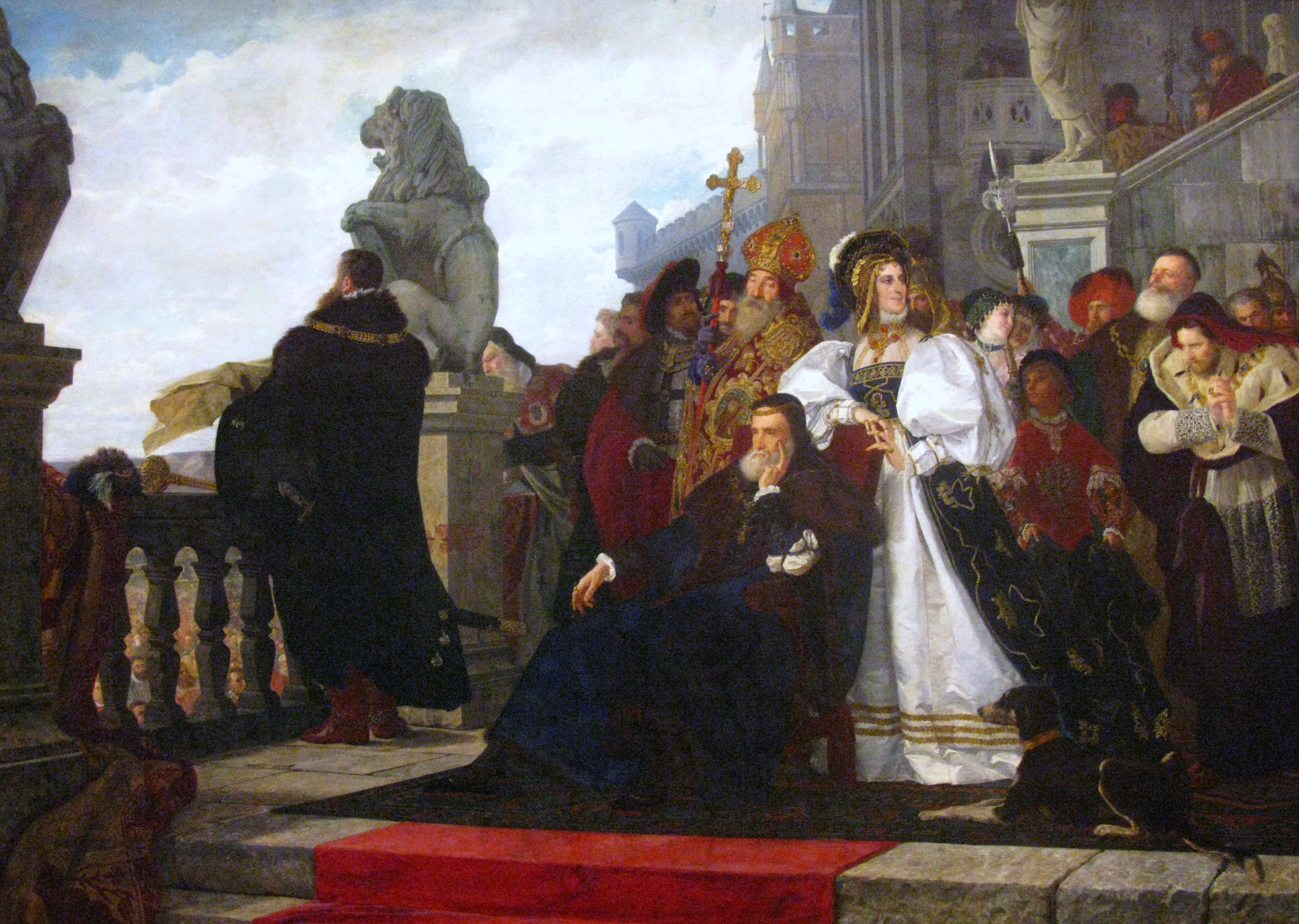
Chicken War in 1537 by Henryk Rodakowski. Seated Sigismund I the Old is accompanied by his wife Bona Sforza and royal court whilst being surrounded by an angry mob at Lwów High Castle.

Believing that one of the most important things needed for strengthening royal authority was appropriate revenue, Bona sought to assemble as much dynastic wealth as possible, which would give her husband's financial independence to defend the kingdom from external threats without the Parliament's slow support. The royal family gained numerous estates in Lithuania and finally took over the Grand Duchy by 1536–1546. She helped to reform agriculture taxation, including uniform duties on the peasants and area measurements. Those actions generated huge profits.

Wanting to ensure the continuity of the Jagiellonian dynasty on the Polish throne, the royal couple decided to make the nobles and magnates recognise their only surviving son, the minor Sigismund II Augustus, as heir to the throne. First, the Lithuanian nobles gave him the ducal throne in October 1529 and in December of the same year, he was declared king; he was crowned Sigismund II Augustus in February 1530. This led to huge opposition from Polish lords, which led to the adoption of the bill that the next coronation would take place after the death of Sigismund II Augustus and only with the consent of all the noble brothers.

In 1539, Bona reluctantly presided over the burning of the 80-year-old Katarzyna Weiglowa for heresy, but that event ushered in an era of tolerance. The Queen's confessor, Francesco Lismanini, assisted in the establishment of a Calvinist Academy in Pińczów.

=== Foreign policy ===
Bona was instrumental in establishing alliances for Poland, but she was rumoured to be a notorious conspirator because of her gender and Italian heritage. In addition to her good relationships with the Vatican, she sought to maintain good relations with the Ottoman Empire and had contacts with Hürrem Sultan, chief consort of Suleiman the Magnificent. It is believed that the good relationship between the Queens saved Poland from being attacked by the Ottoman Army during the Italian Wars.

Worried about the growing ties between the Habsburgs and Russia by 1524, Sigismund signed a Franco-Polish alliance with King Francis I of France to avoid a possible two-front war. Bona was instrumental in establishing an alliance between Poland and France with the objective of recovering Milan. The negotiations came to an end, and the alliance was disbanded after Francis' troops were defeated by Charles V at the Battle of Pavia in 1525.

Despite their blood relation, Bona was sometimes a fierce opponent of the Habsburgs. She advocated attaching Silesia to the Polish crown in return for her hereditary principalities of Bari and Rossano, but Sigismund the Old did not fully support this idea. Wanting to secure her eldest daughter in the Kingdom of Hungary, Bona successfully supported her son-in-law John Zápolya as successor against Ferdinand of Habsburg after Louis II of Hungary was killed at Mohács in 1526.

In 1537, Bona Sforza established a settlement at Bar in what is now Ukraine.

=== Artistic patronage ===
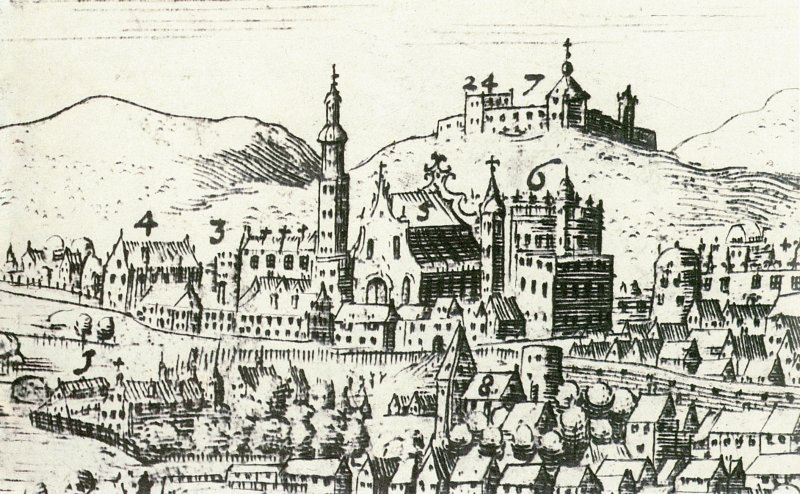
The Palace of the Grand Dukes (marked as number 6) in Vilnius Lower Castle in the late 16th century.

Alongside her husband's profound interest in the revival of classical antiquity, Bona was instrumental in developing the Polish Renaissance. She brought renowned Italian artists, architects and sculptors from her native country. Her most well-known artistic involvement was the expansion of the Palace of the Grand Dukes of Lithuania in Vilnius and the construction of Ujazdów Castle, which included a large park and a menagerie. The plans were prepared by Bartolomeo Berrecci da Pontassieve, who designed several other projects in Poland.

== Queen Mother ==
On 1 April 1548, Sigismund I the Old died and was succeeded by Sigismund II Augustus. The deceased king was buried in Wawel Cathedral alongside his and Bona's late son, Prince Albertus. The mother and the son had entered into a conflict over his marriage to Barbara Radziwiłł, a former mistress who was vehemently opposed by the nobility, but she eventually accepted her son's decision and recognised Barbara as her daughter-in-law and the Queen of Poland. Still, their relationship turned difficult, and after her husband's death, Bona moved with her unmarried daughters to Masovia and stayed there for eight years before moving back to Bari.

=== Neapolitan loans and death ===
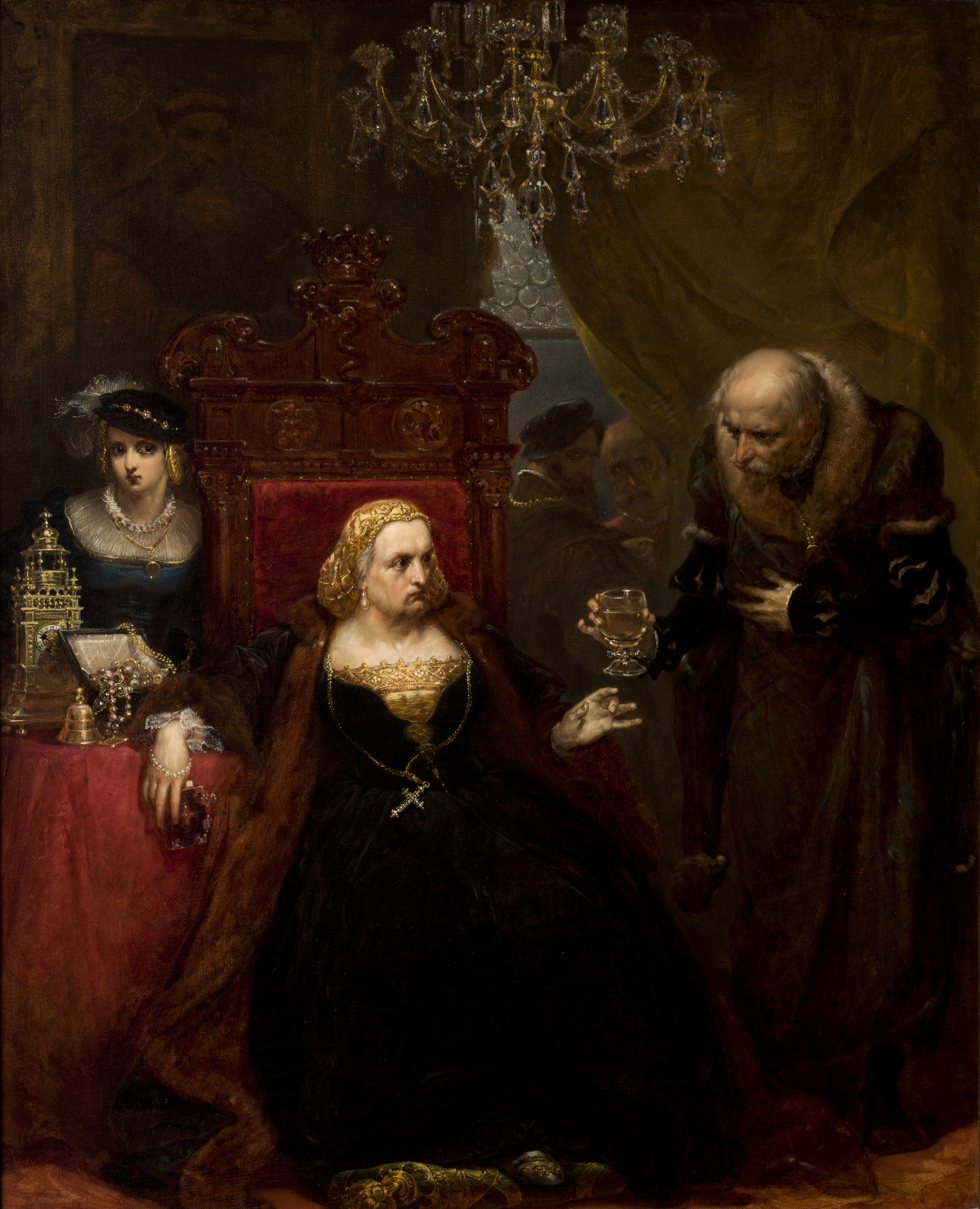
Poisoning of Queen Bona, painted in the 19th century by Jan Matejko

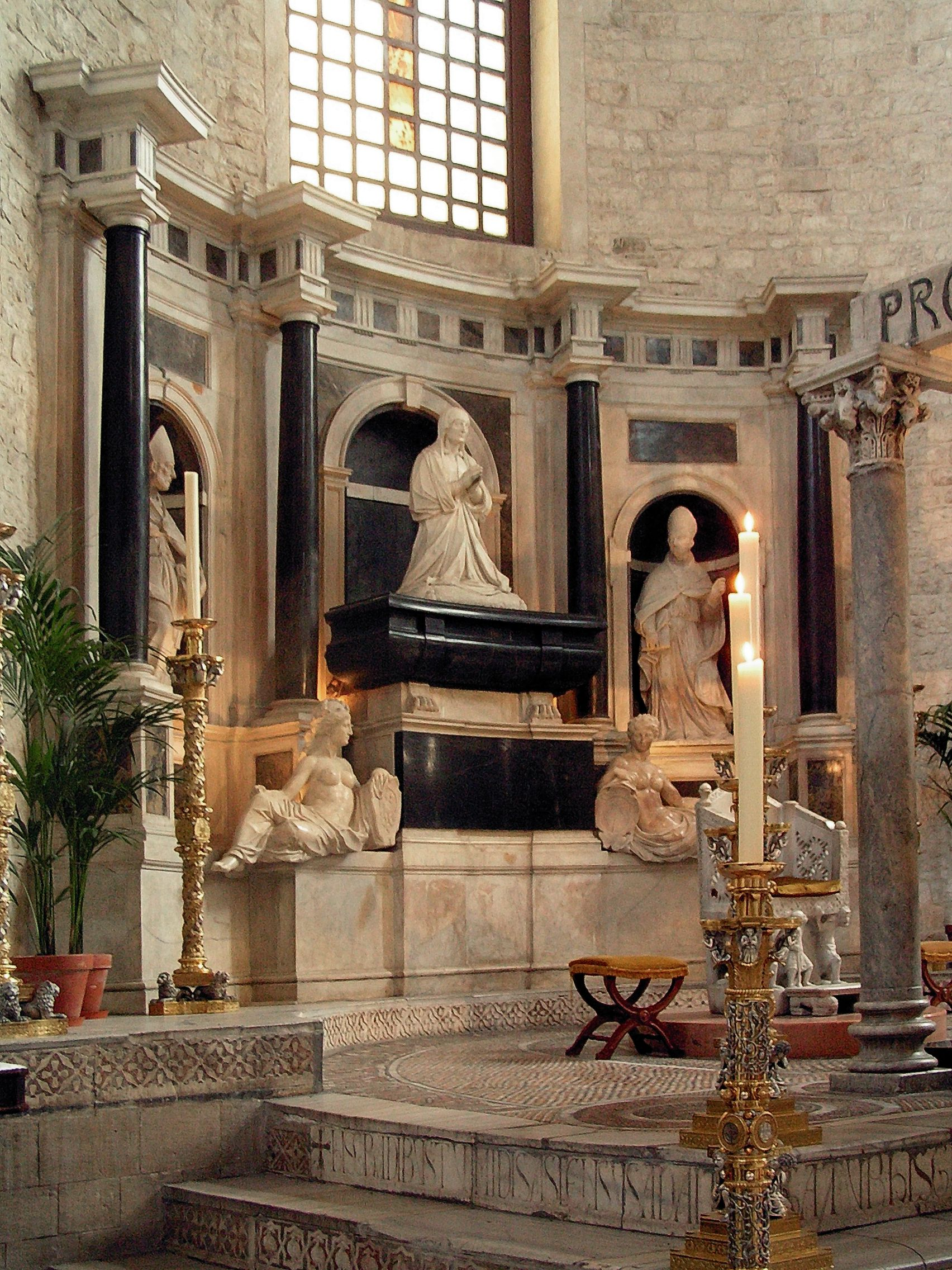
Tomb monument of Bona Sforza in the Basilica di San Nicola, Bari

In February 1556, Bona left Poland for her native Italy with treasures that she had accumulated over 38 years. In May, she reached Bari and took possession of her mother's duchy. She was soon visited by envoys of King Philip II of Spain, who attempted to convince her to give up the duchies of Bari and Rossano in favour of Habsburg Spain. However, Fernando Álvarez de Toledo, 3rd Duke of Alba, the viceroy of Naples, feared a French attack and raised money for troops. Perhaps having ambitions of becoming a viceroy of Naples herself, Bona agreed to lend the Duke of Alba a huge sum of 430,000 ducats at 10% annual interest. The loan was guaranteed by customs duties collected in Foggia and the agreements were signed on both 23 September and 5 December 1556.

However, the Habsburgs were determined to obtain Bari and did not intend to repay the loan. On 8 November, Bona became ill with a stomachache. On 17 November, as she was losing consciousness, her trusted courtier Gian Lorenzo Pappacoda brought to her the notary Marco Vincenzo de Baldis, who recorded her last will. It left Bari, Rossano, Ostuni and Grottaglie to Philip II of Spain and large sums to Pappacoda's family. Her daughters would receive a one-time payment of 50,000 ducats, except for Isabella Jagiellon, who was to receive 10,000 ducats annually. Her only son, King Sigismund II Augustus, was named as the main beneficiary, but in the end, he would inherit only cash, jewellery, and other personal property. The next day, however, Bona felt better and dictated a new last will to Scipio Catapani that left Bari and other property to Sigismund Augustus.

Bona died in the early morning of 19 November 1557, at the age of 63. It is suspected she was poisoned by trusted household members. She was buried in the Basilica di San Nicola in Bari, where her daughter, Anna, had a tomb erected for her in the Renaissance style.

== Physical appearance ==
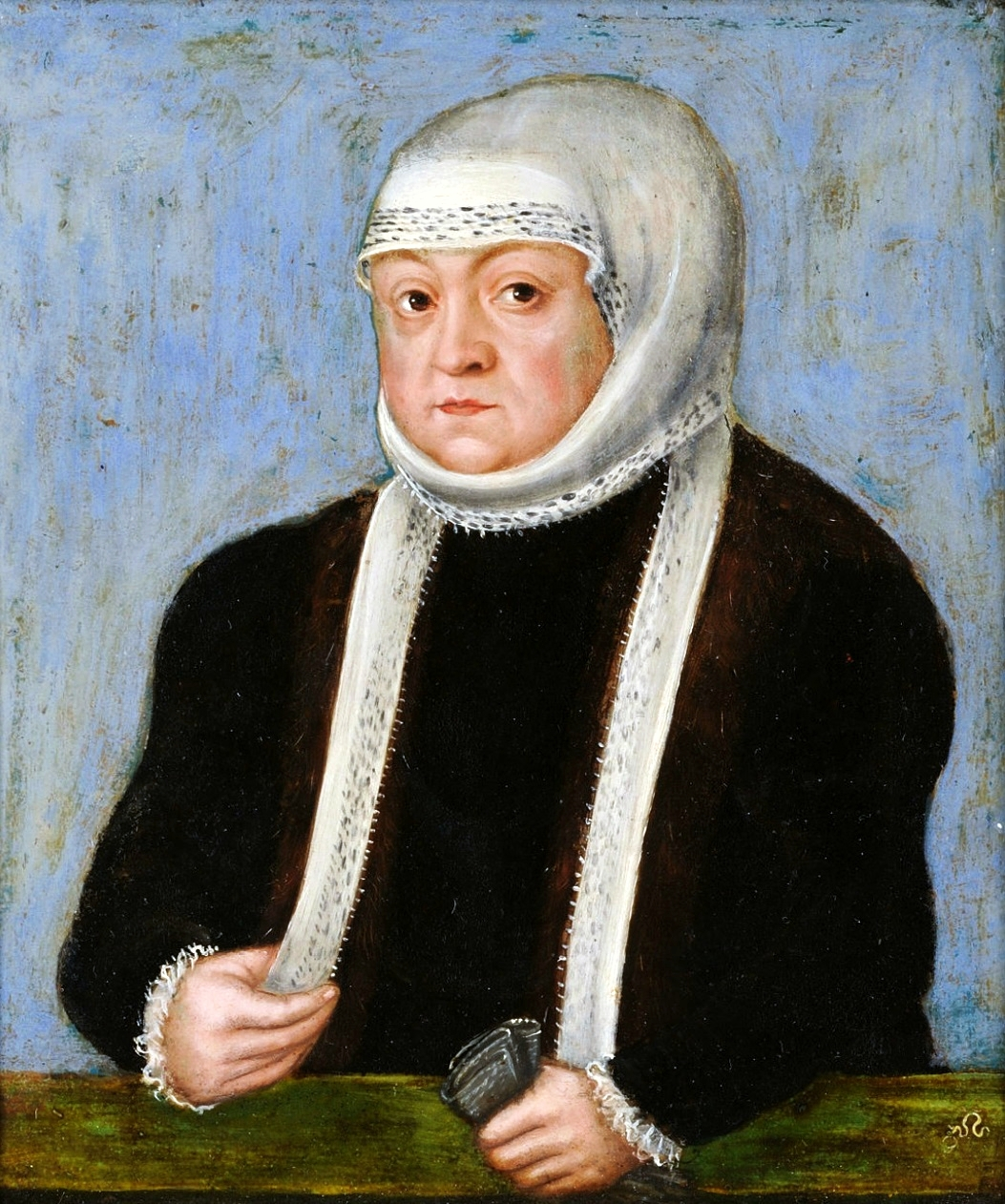
Potrait of Bona as a widow, by Lucas Cranach the Younger, c. 1556

Bona was reported to have fair blond hair, dark eyebrows and rosy cheeks; at the age of 24, she was viewed as an incredibly beautiful woman by the Polish envoys who oversaw her betrothal to Sigismund I, as well as by bishop Konarski, who compared her to a nymph while welcoming her into Cracow. On the other hand, Bona was seen as very ugly by others, so much so that the proposal (advanced by Naples) of a marriage between her and the fourteen-year-old Federico Gonzaga was not even taken into consideration by his mother Isabella d'Este, nor by the archdeacon Alessandro di Gabbioneta, who considered it a sin to sacrifice the flourishing beauty of the young Federico to a "mature and ugly" woman like Bona. The latter, for her part, tried to make her face more graceful through jewellery and fabrics, but with little success, since "little or nothing has graced her."

== Affairs ==
During her youth in Bari, Bona Sforza took the young Ettore Pignatelli as her lover. He was the eldest son of Alessandro Pignatelli, who, in turn, was the lover of her mother Isabella d'Aragona, Duchess of Milan. However, Ettore died under mysterious circumstances. It is believed that he was poisoned by Bona after he refused to follow her to Poland, where she intended to marry Sigismund. Widowed by her husband in 1548, Bona became involved in a romantic affair with Giovanni Lorenzo Pappacoda.

== Issue ==
Bona was pregnant six times during the first nine years of her marriage. Her children were:

- Isabella (18 January 1519 – 15 September 1559): Married John Zápolya, King of Hungary;
- Sigismund II Augustus (1 August 1520 – 7 July 1572): Succeeded his father as King of Poland and Grand Duke of Lithuania;
- Sophia (13 July 1522 – 28 May 1575): Married Henry V, Duke of Brunswick-Lüneburg;
- Anna (18 October 1523 – 9 September 1596): Eventually succeeded her brother as Queen of Poland and Grand Duchess of Lithuania in her own right;
- Catherine (1 November 1526 – 16 September 1583): Married John III of Sweden;
- Albertus (or Adalbertus) (born and died 20 September 1527): Born prematurely and died shortly after.

== See also ==
- Chicken War
- Neapolitan sums

== Sources ==
- Ferrante, Giulio Marchetti (1924). Rievocazioni del Rinascimento. Laterza and Figli.
- Kosior, Katarzyna (2019). Becoming A Queen in Early Modern Europe. Switzerland: Palgrave Macmillan.
- Lepri, Valentina (2019). Knowledge Transfer and the Early Modern University: Statecraft and Philosophy at the Akademia Zamojska (1596–1627). Brill Publishers.
- lombardo (1906). Archivio storico lombardo. Vol. 33. Società Storica Lombarda.

Bona Sforza House of Sforza Born: 2 February 1494 Died: 19 November 1557
Royal titles
| Preceded by Barbara Zápolya | Queen consort of Poland; Grand Duchess consort of Lithuania; 1518 – 1548 with Elisabeth of Austria (1543 – 1545) | Succeeded by Barbara Radziwiłł |
Italian nobility
| Preceded by Isabella of Aragon | Duchess of Bari; Princess of Rossano; 1524 – 1557 | Annexed by Naples |
