= Isabella of Aragon, Duchess of Milan =

Duchess regnant of Bari from 1500 to 1524

Isabella of Aragon
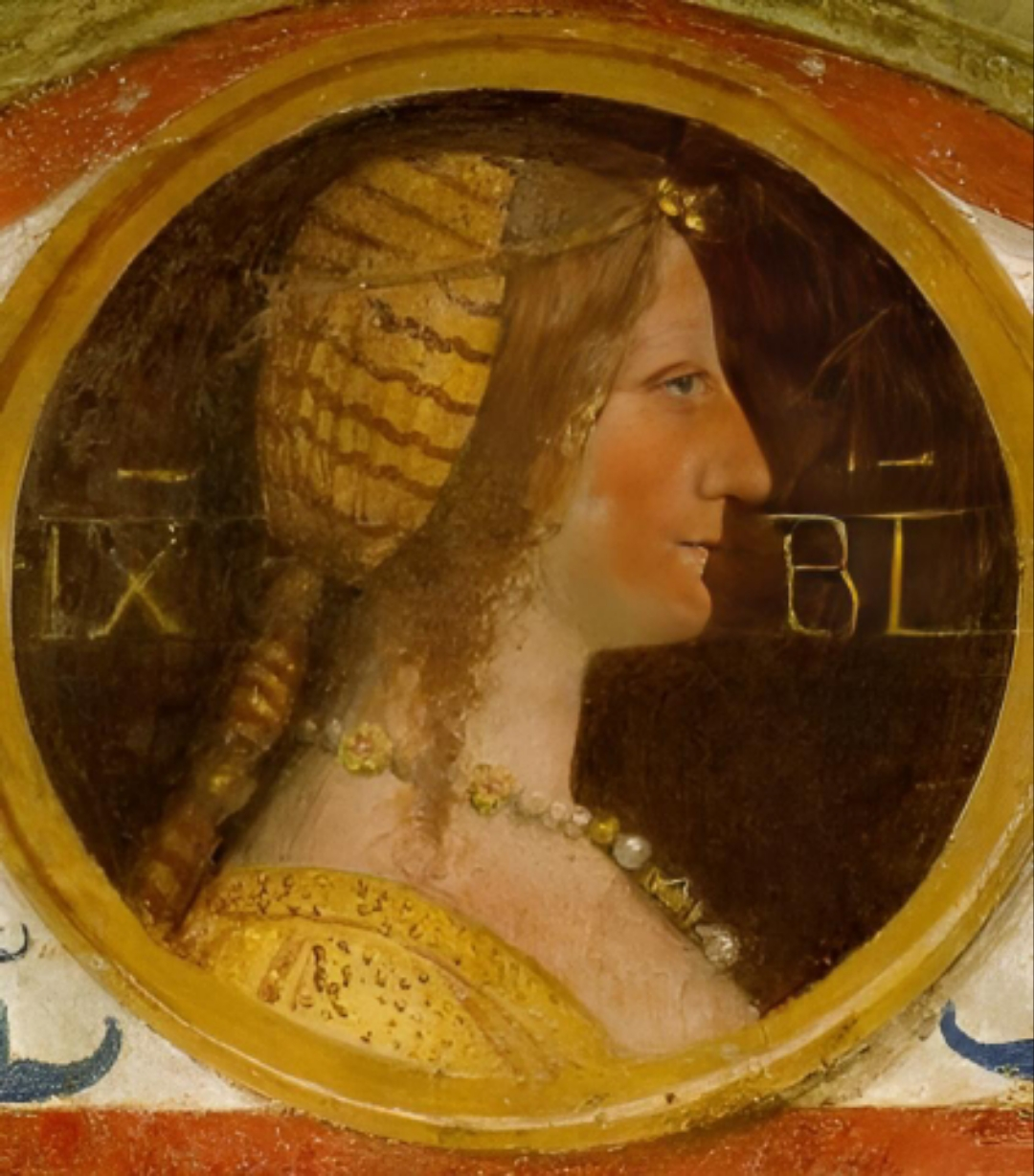
- Lunette of Isabella of Aragon in the house of the Atellani, Milan.

Duchess regnant of Bari
- Reign: 10 April 1500 – 1524
- Predecessor: Ludovico il Moro
- Successor: Bona

Duchess consort of Milan
- Tenure: 2 February 1489 - 21 October 1494
- Born: 2 October 1470; Naples, Kingdom of Naples
- Died: 11 February 1524 (aged 53); Bari, Kingdom of Naples
- Burial: San Domenico Maggiore, Naples
- Spouse: Gian Galeazzo Sforza (m. 1489; died 1494)
- Issue more...: Francesco Maria, Count of Pavia; Ippolita Maria; Bona Maria, Queen of Poland
- House: Trastámara
- Father: Alfonso II of Naples
- Mother: Ippolita Maria Sforza

Isabella of Aragon (2 October 1470 – 11 February 1524), also known as Isabella of Naples, was by marriage Duchess of Milan and suo jure Duchess of Bari.

A member of the Neapolitan branch of the House of Trastámara, her life was characterised by the political crises surrounding the Italian Wars. Isabella often found herself torn between her native Kingdom of Naples and her marital home of the Duchy of Milan, causing her to suffer personal and political difficulties. After a disastrous marriage and lack of support in Milan, she received the Duchy of Bari as her personal property. This change in circumstances gave Isabella the opportunity to form her own court as well as build up political support and security against the ongoing wars. These reforms along with her interest in arts and literature, resulted in Bari undergoing revival and refurbishment. During this period, she also concentrated on the education of her daughter Bona, who became Queen of Poland.

== Life ==
=== Childhood and Family ===
Isabella was born in the Kingdom of Naples, during the reign of her paternal grandfather King Ferdinand I of Naples. She was the second child of his heir, Alfonso, Duke of Calabria (who became King in 1494) and his wife, Ippolita Maria Sforza. Named after her paternal grandmother Isabella of Clermont (who died in 1465), the princess was educated at the residence of the Dukes of Calabria in Castel Capuano, and one of her teachers was the poet and humanist Giovanni Pontano. She was interested in music and poetry, and in her spare time she wrote some poems.

The only daughter from her parents' marriage, Isabella had two brothers: the elder was Prince Ferdinand (who would succeed their father to throne in 1495 but died one year later in October 1496) and the younger was Prince Piero (who was Lieutenant General of Apulia and Prince of Rossano, but died young of an infection following leg surgery on 17 February 1491). The siblings were raised alongside their cousins, the children of Eleanor of Naples, who included Isabella d'Este and Beatrice d'Este. Isabella had a particularly close relationship with the latter, developing into something of a sisterhood.

During her childhood, Isabella's parents had a difficult relationship, which was characterised by rivalry and contempt. Alfonso, perhaps threatened by Ippolita Maria's high level of education or disdainful of her pedigree, treated his wife with a lack of respect throughout the marriage. Alfonso preferred the company of his mistress, Trogia Gazzela, by whom he had two illegitimate children during Isabella's childhood. Her grandfather was a courageous ruler, who did not hold back when it came to dealing with his enemies. Being raised at this ruthless court in Naples certainly would have had an effect on Isabella, affecting her character as an adult.

From 1471, Isabella was planned to marry Gian Galeazzo Sforza, heir of the Duchy of Milan, and the preparations were concluded with the contract prepared on 26 September 1472. The bride and groom were first cousins (Isabella's mother and Gian Galeazzo's father were siblings), so a papal dispensation was needed, which was easily obtained from Pope Sixtus IV. On 30 April (or 1 May according to other sources) 1480 the betrothal was celebrated at the Castello di Porta Giova in Milan. In August 1488, the Sforza envoy Agostino Calco came to Naples to discuss the final details and the course of the ceremony. Calco's arrival coincided with the death of Isabella's mother, Ippolita Maria. Despite the period of mourning, King Ferdinand II of Aragon and Isabella's father decided not to postpone the wedding.

=== Marriage ===
==== Wedding celebrations ====
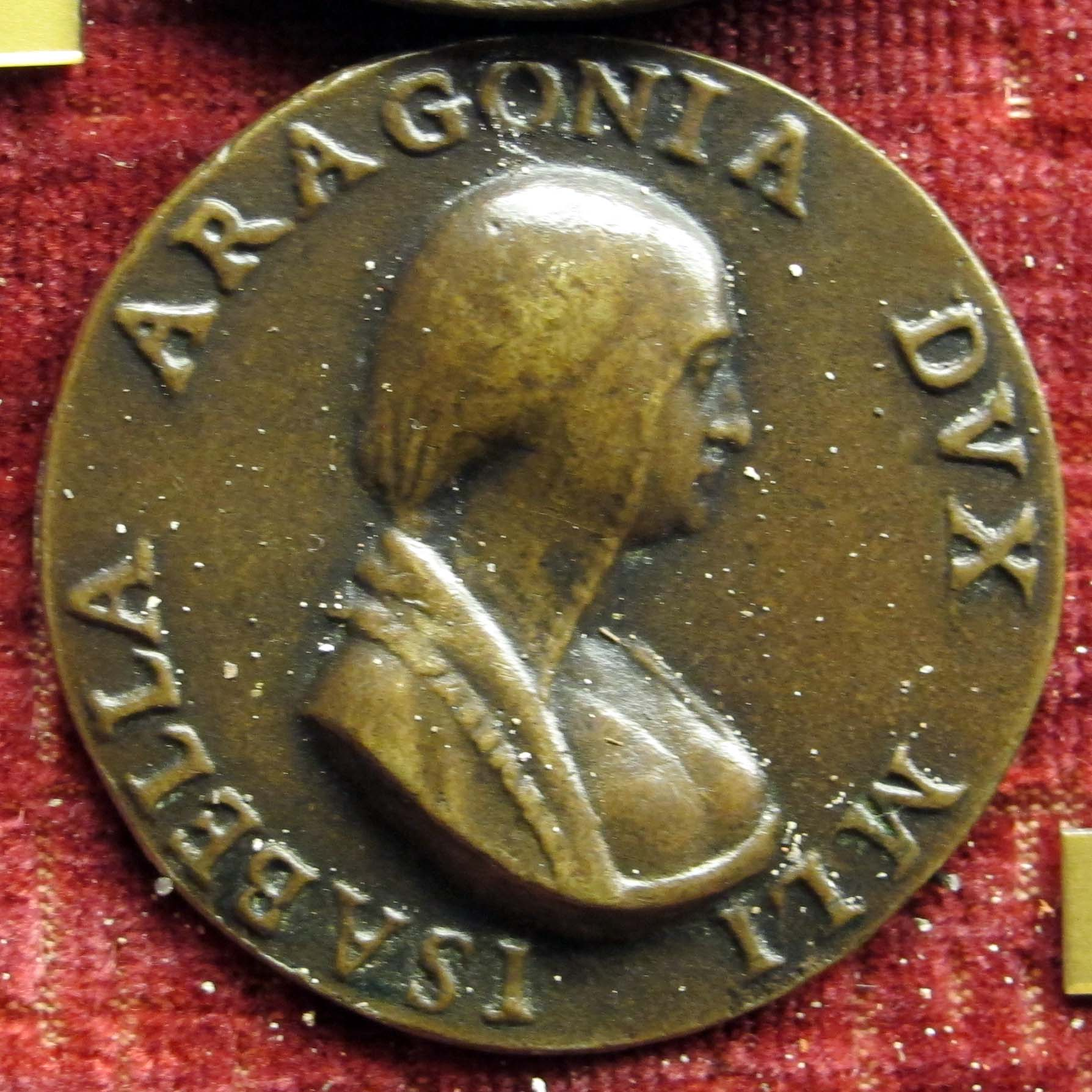
Gian Cristoforo Romano, medal of Isabella of Aragon.

In December 1488, the Milanese legation headed by the groom's brother Ermes, Marquis of Tortona went to Naples, where on 23 December, the marriage per procura took place. On 26 December, Isabella and her numerous entourage (Note: In Isabella's retinue, apart from a large entourage, there were also three Arab and ten black African slaves.) set off to meet her future husband. On 18 January 1489 she arrived in Genoa —there she rested before traveling to Tortona, where Gian Galeazzo was waiting for her. The meeting of the future spouses took place on 24 January. On 1 February, Isabella traveled from Vigevano to Milan, where the next day (2 February) the wedding ceremony was finally held in Milan Cathedral.

The ambassador Giacomo Trotti described Isabella on the occasion of the wedding: "the aforementioned new Duchess is a little dark-faced and not very beautiful, but she has a kind and beautiful person". Conversely, "the Duke is beautiful and very good".

Great celebrations followed the marriage. On 13 January 1490, in the Sala Verde of the Castello di Porta Giova, a masque or operetta entitled Il Paradiso, with a libretto by Bernardo Bellincioni was staged on the occasion of the wedding of Isabella with Gian Galeazzo. The scenography and costumes for the operetta were designed by Leonardo da Vinci. Despite the reports of ambassador Trotti, others praised Isabella for her beauty, like the Ferrarese ambassador who commented: "she was so beautiful and radiant that she seemed like the sun". The operetta was written very much with this praise for Isabella in mind. Il Paradiso was the representation of the seven planets orbiting round. A man portrayed each of the planets and all would speak praise of Isabella. Therefore, the operetta depicted Isabella as being at the centre of the universe. In addition to the acknowledgment of her physical appearance, Isabella was also noted for having an energetic personality; Gian Galeazzo, on the other hand, was quite a contrast to his wife; he was pale, studious and melancholy. The differences of personality would affect the marriage as well as in politics during the 1490s.

==== First years in Milan ====
Soon after the wedding, the spouses moved against their will to Pavia, where Gian Galeazzo's uncle and Regent Ludovico Sforza prepared their seat. Isabella's relationship with her uncle was not going well. The Duchess, on the other hand, had a great liking for Ludovico's lover, Cecilia Gallerani. Isabella's marriage was also unsuccessful at first. After the wedding, Gian Galeazzo did not intend to consummate the union. In April 1490, reports of Isabella's continuing virginity even reached the Hungarian court to her aunt, Queen consort Beatrice of Aragon. After almost thirteen months, Gian Galeazzo began sexual relations with his wife, and Isabella became pregnant in May 1490. On 30 January 1491, during the wedding celebrations of Ludovico Sforza and Beatrice d'Este, Isabella gave birth to a son, named Francesco Maria in honour of both hers and her husband's grandfather Francesco I Sforza. This worried Ludovico, since the birth of the heir could made Gian Galeazzo and Isabella as potential figureheads for opposition to his position as Regent, which he was unwilling to relinquish. In order to weaken any coup attempts made by Isabella and her husband, Ludovico had her Neapolitan retinue returned home and restricted the young Duchess from appointing and rewarding followers.

Despite the initial good understanding between Isabella and Beatrice, (Note: The cousins often socialised regularly: they went hunting, played endless games of palla and designed dresses that they wished to have made. Beatrice was regarded as naughtier than Isabella, often persuading her cousin to participate in other activities, such as wandering around the market place dressed in disguise and without a chaperone.) soon aroused serious disputes over precedence: despite being the Duchess consort and thus the highest ranking woman at the Milanese court, Isabella was displaced by Ludovico's wife: Leonardo da Vinci was active in creating pageants and decorations in honour of Beatrice, and she was even given a political role, acting as ducal ambassador to Venice in 1493. In contrast, Isabella and her growing family were starved of household funds and she was forced to make petitions for allowance increases. It is of little surprise that she wrote to her father, asking him to intervene on her behalf. Ludovico used the Neapolitan connection to his advantage, portraying Isabella as working in the interests of her Neapolitan family or indeed in her own desire to dominate her husband and obtain power in Milan.

Over time, the conflict between Isabella and Ludovico, fueled by Beatrice d'Este, intensified. The Regent gave Isabella a gloomy and insecure chamber intended to discourage her from staying in Milan. He also took on the responsibility of educating Francesco Maria, isolating him from his parents. When attempts to talk with Ludovico did not help, Isabella made efforts to get closer to the Regent's wife, her cousin and childhood friend Beatrice, who in exchange for her help urged Isabella to remove from the court Ludovico's mistress, Cecilia Gallerani. (Note: The apparent friendship with Cecilia Gallerani was probably aimed by Isabella with the intention to winning over Ludovico's favor.)

==== Isolation at the Milanese court ====
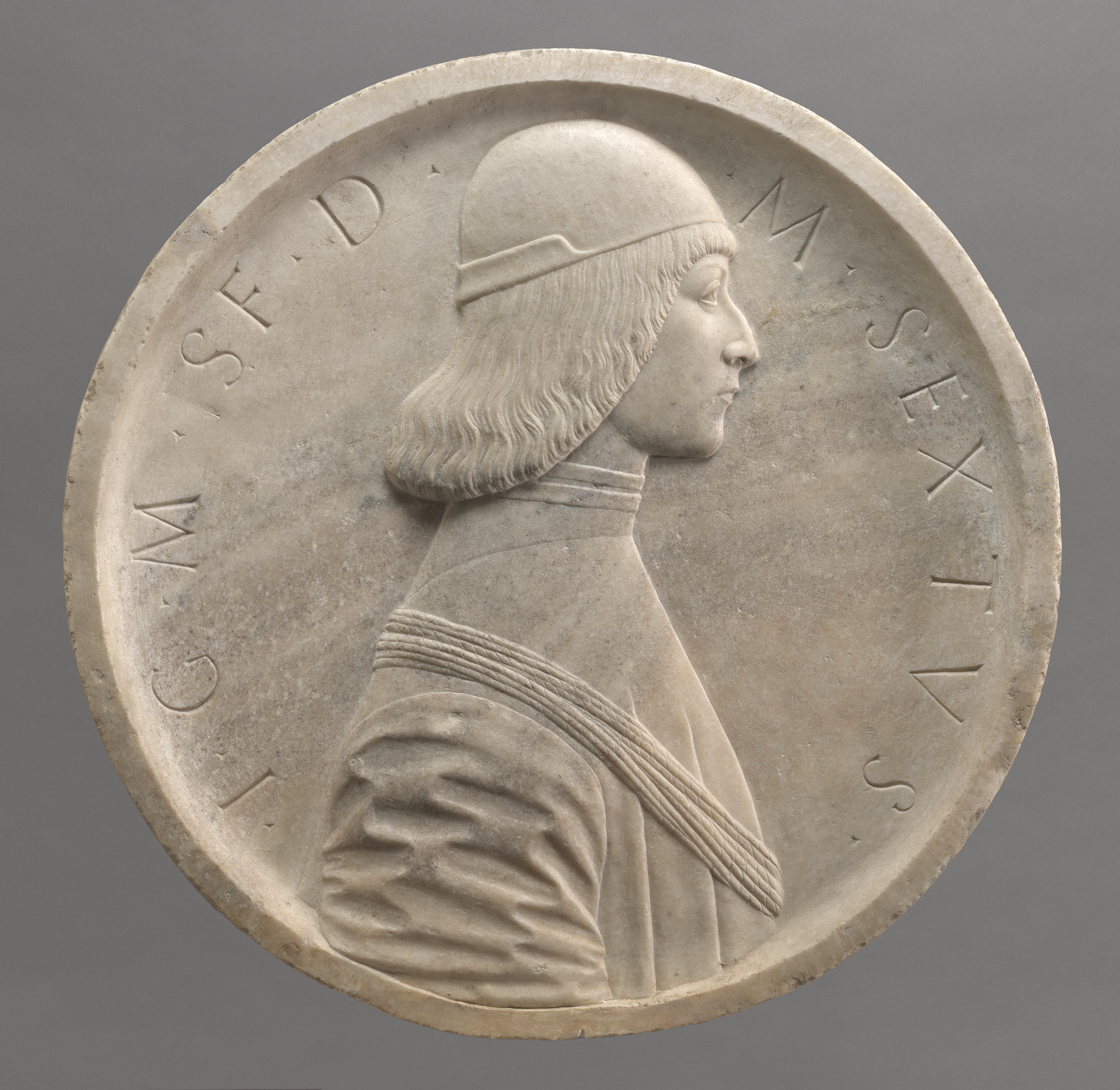
Marble medal of Gian Galeazzo Sforza, Duke of Milan, by Benedetto Briosco, ca. 1490.

Relations with her husband, Gian Galeazzo, worsened. The Duke preferred the company of young men sent to him by his uncle over his wife and reprimanded her Milanese pastimes, and during the quarrels there were fights. In the fall of 1492, a scandal broke out when Isabella was accused of attempted murder. When the Duchess found out that Gian Galeazzo had a special affection for a lover called Rozone, she (perhaps out of jealousy towards her husband) urged the servants to poison not only the Duke's favorite but also Galeazzo Sanseverino, probably another lover, who was accused by Isabella of persuading the Duke to lead a life of debauchery. King Ferdinand I of Naples, informed on the matter, replied that it was impossible that Isabella had tried to poison Galeazzo, who was "loved by them as a son and always proved to be a good servant and relative"; as for Rozone, he justified the behavior of his granddaughter, saying indeed that he was surprised that "out of desperation" she had not done worse.

Ludovico used this incident to completely discredit Isabella, who since then lived in complete isolation —appearing only at official ceremonies. When on 26 January 1493, Isabella gave birth to a daughter, Ippolita Maria (named after her maternal grandmother the Duchess of Calabria), the event passed without publicity, because the day before Ludovico's son, Ercole Massimiliano was born, and this event was greeted by great pomp and ceremony, befitting an heir, something that had been denied to Isabella's son. On 2 February 1494 in Vigevano, the Duchess gave birth to another daughter, Bona Maria (named after her paternal grandmother Bona of Savoy). (Note: Bona's date of birth is known from the Queen's handwritten note in her Prayer Book; however, italian biographer and journalist Daniela Pizzagalli incorrectly states that Bona was born in February 1495.)

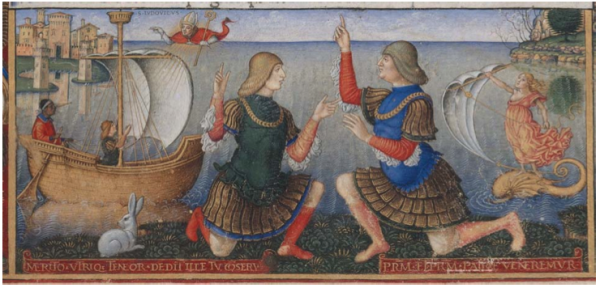
Gian Galeazzo Sforza with his uncle and regent Ludovico Sforza.

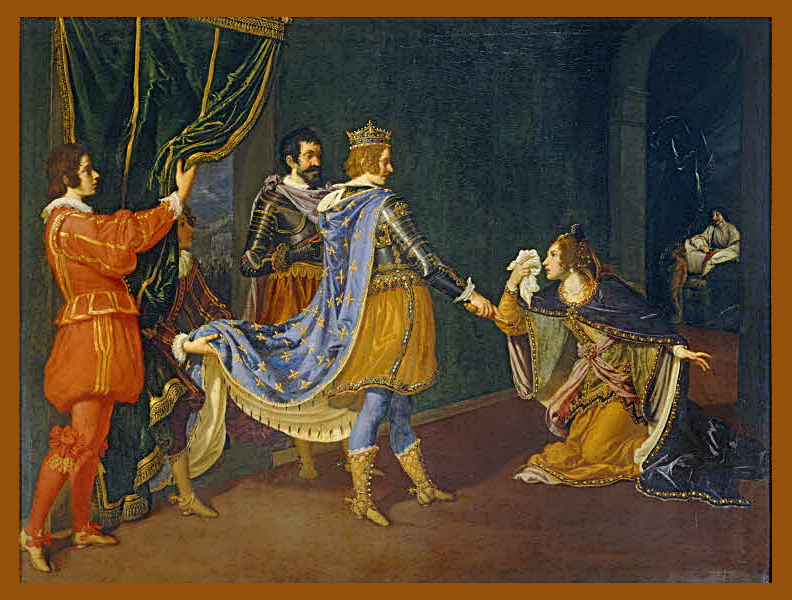
Isabella pleads before King Charles VIII, by Giovanni Bilivert.

Ludovico was now openly pursuing his ambition for absolute control over Milan. An important aspect of this was foreign policy, and his anti-Aragonese policy was far from favourable to Isabella or her Neapolitan family. In response to Ludovico's actions, Isabella's father had encouraged French ambitions over Milan. Understanding the weight of this threat, Ludovico severed diplomatic ties with the Neapolitan court and built an alliance with Maximilian I, Holy Roman Emperor. The reason for this particular alliance was that the Emperor had the power to grant the Dukedom to Ludovico. Meanwhile, Isabella and her husband found themselves confined to Castello Visconteo in Pavia, where they were essentially prisoners.

Ludovico encouraged Charles VIII of France to attack Naples and remove the threat of Isabella's father. When the French King arrived in the Duchy of Milan in October 1494, on his way to Naples, he was well received by Ludovico and Beatrice. Around this time, Isabella made a move and appealed to Charles VIII. She tearfully pleaded for the King to have mercy on her father; Charles VIII was embarrassed by Isabella's actions but he did have sympathy for her husband, who was dying. Isabella's pleading was in vain, the Italian Wars were underway and her father would be ousted from his throne by the French in 1495. In his infamous work The Prince, Niccolò Machiavelli blamed Ludovico for the devastation, claiming that he invited the French to attack Naples.

When Isabella appealed to the French King, the historian Philippe de Commines had been a part of his retinue. He had the following to say about her actions: "She had better have prayed for herself, who was still a young and fair lady". This quote has particular relevance when observing that the fall of Naples was not the only tragedy to befall her at this time: the sickly Gian Galeazzo experienced a relapse of his stomach ailments, which, after several days of agony, led to the death of the young Duke on 21 October 1494. The very next day, the nobility proclaimed Ludovico Sforza as the new ruler of Milan.

=== Widowhood ===
==== Difficult times after her husbands's death ====
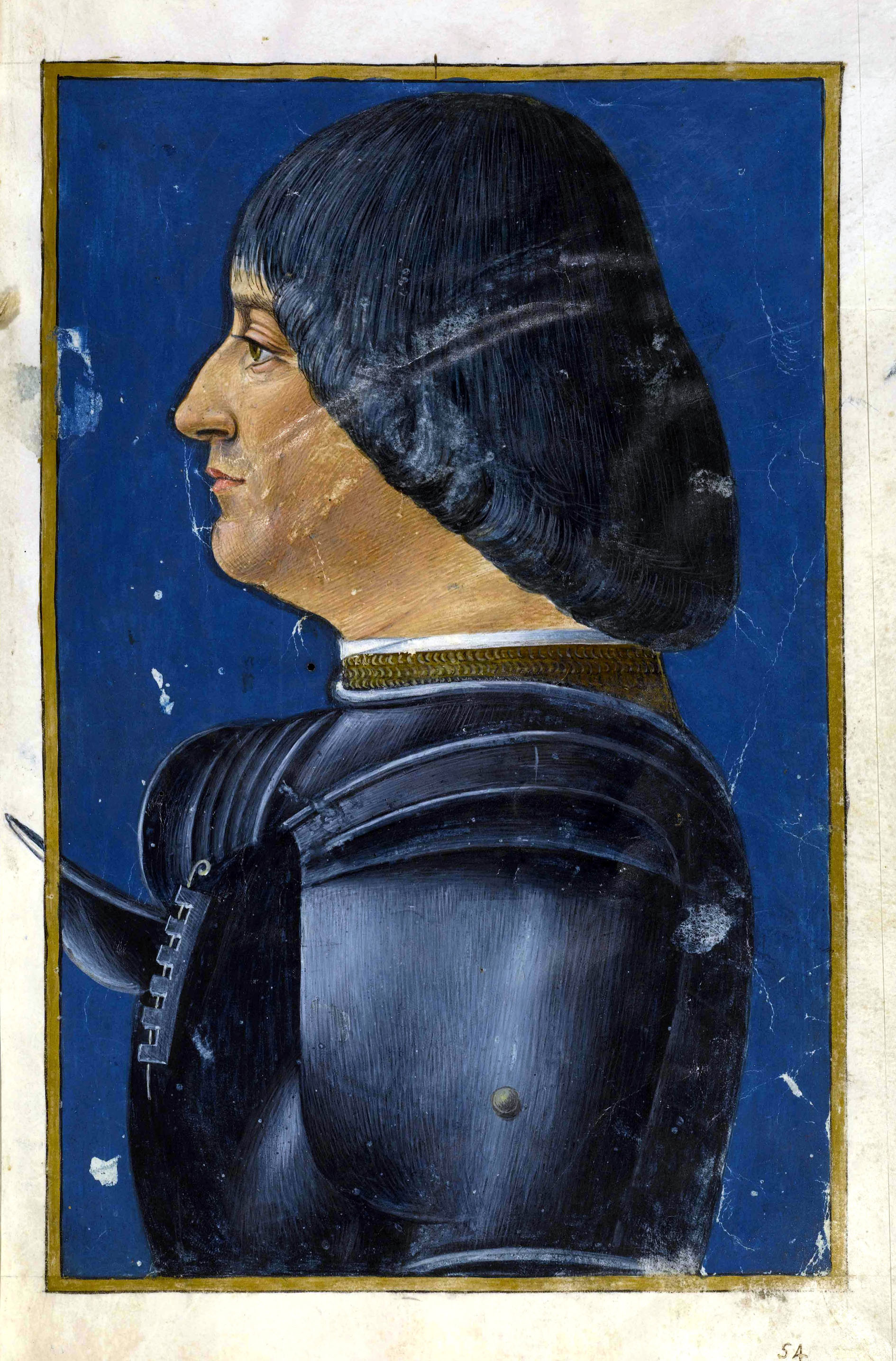
Ludovico Sforza, Duke of Milan, by Giovanni Ambrogio de Predis.

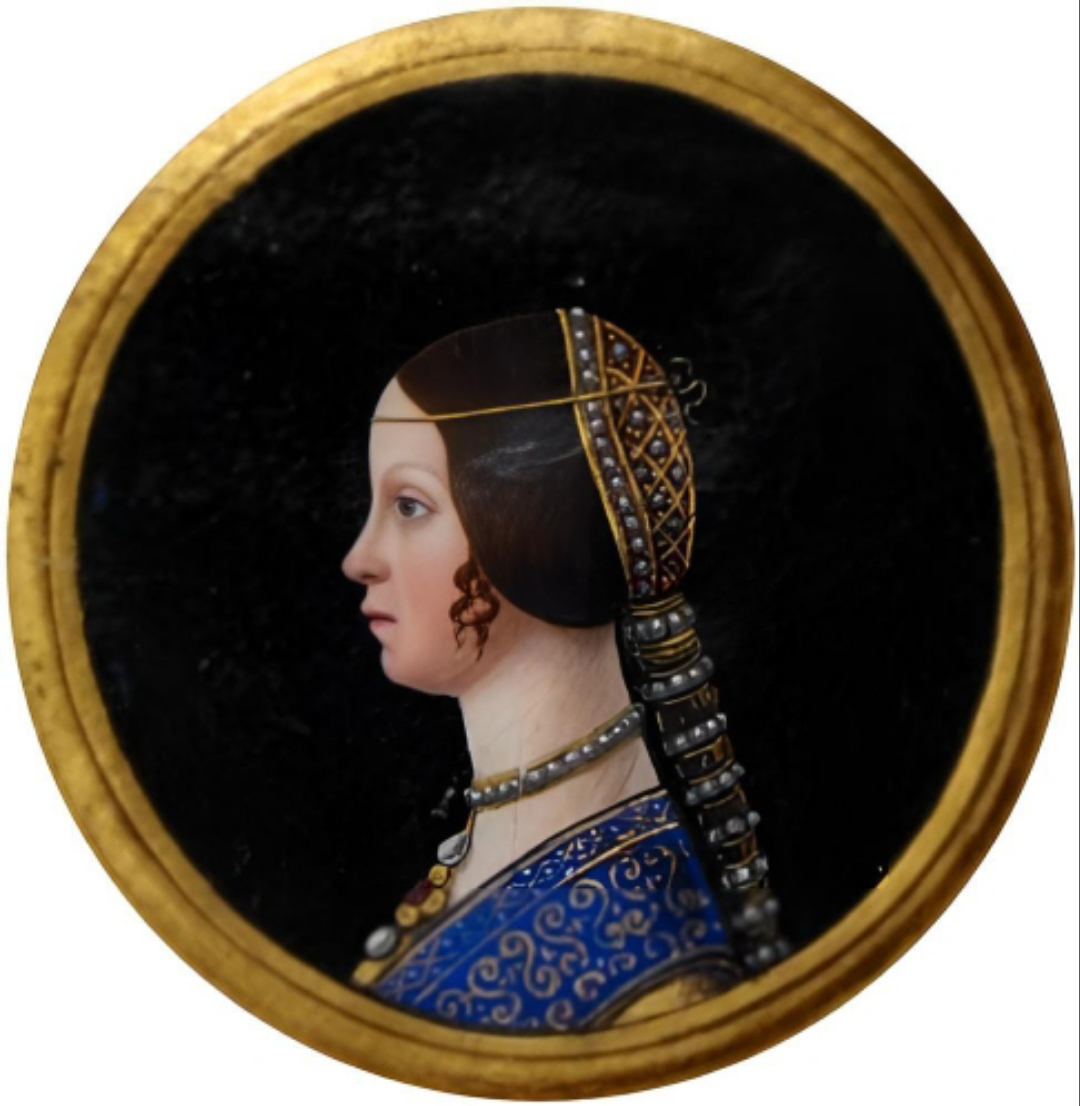
Beatrice d'Este, miniature by Giovanni Pietro Birago.

Isabella, who was pregnant at that time, was very much affected by her husband's demise and the takeover of power by Ludovico. For almost six weeks, she retired with her two children to the Castello Visconteo in Pavia, Lombardy, where she avoided visitors. On 6 December 1494, Ludovico persuaded Isabella to move with her children to the Castello Sforzesco in Milan. Sforza then moved to La Roccheta with his family. During her stay in Milan, Isabella was under guard that prevented her from contacting the world. Despite her isolation, the Dowager Duchess lived a very lavish life. In February 1495 she gave birth to her youngest daughter, Bianca Maria (named after Isabella and Gian Galeazzo's grandmother Bianca Maria Visconti); ten months later, on 18 December, Isabella's father, King Alfonso II of Naples (who already abdicated in favor of his son on 23 January), died, and on 7 September 1496 her brother and new King Ferdinand II of Naples followed their father to the grave. Soon after, Isabella's eighteen-month-old daughter, Bianca Maria, also died. In 1496, Ludovico's two children also died: Leone and Bianca Giovanna, and the presence of Isabella and her children began to irritate the ruler of Milan. The Dowager Duchess then moved to the former Sforza Palace near Milan Cathedral, leaving her son Francesco at Ludovico's court. In 1497, Beatrice d'Este, Isabella's one-time friend and rival died in childbirth, aged twenty-one.

For Ludovico, the death of his wife was only the beginning of his misfortunes: in 1499, after an armed expedition of King Louis XII of France, Ludovico went into exile. However, any satisfaction that Isabella could have gained from witnessing the downfall of her rival was minimised; the Dowager Duchess petitioned Louis XII to name her son Duke of Bari, a title that belonged to the Sforza family. The French King, after seeing the popularity of Isabella's son was growing among the inhabitants of Milan, responded by taking the young boy to France, assuring Isabella that he planned to marry him with his daughter. In reality, Louis XII deceived Isabella by placing Francesco Maria in a monastery. She refused to give up hope for her son's return and petitioned the King of Romans Maximilian I to liberate him from France. However, this effort proved fruitless: she never saw her son again. This, along with the dethronement of her family in Naples, led to Isabella developing a deep hatred for the French.

The Dowager Duchess received a modest income from Louis XII and went to Naples with her two daughters. On the way to her hometown, she visited relatives and relatives in Mantua and Bologna. In mid-February 1500, she stayed in Rome with her illegitimate half-brother Alfonso of Aragon, Duke of Bisceglie, husband of Lucrezia Borgia, daughter of Pope Alexander VI. Soon she and her daughters arrived to Naples, where they were greeted by her uncle, King Frederick.

The final defeat of Ludovico at the Battle of Novara on 8 April 1500 improved Isabella's financial situation. King Frederick of Naples ordered the Sforza vassals to pay tribute to his niece, the Dowager Duchess. Isabella then tried to fight for the restoration of his son's rights over the Duchy of Milan, with the help of her sister-in-law Bianca Maria (Queen consort of the Romans as wife of Maximilian I), which, however, ultimately ended in failure.

In the meanwhile, the situation in the Kingdom of Naples was not safe: Louis XII was determined to once again press the French claim on Naples. The representatives of the French King and those of King Ferdinand II of Aragon and Queen Isabella of Castile signed a secret treaty in Granada on 11 November 1500. The French and Aragonese sovereigns agreed to attack Naples, conquer it and immediately divide it between themselves. Louis XII would receive Naples, Terra di Lavoro and Abruzzo and the titles of King of Jerusalem and King of Naples.

Reflecting upon the tragedies that had befallen her, the Dowager Duchess of Milan began signing herself off in letters as Isabella, unique in misfortune.

==== Duchess of Bari ====
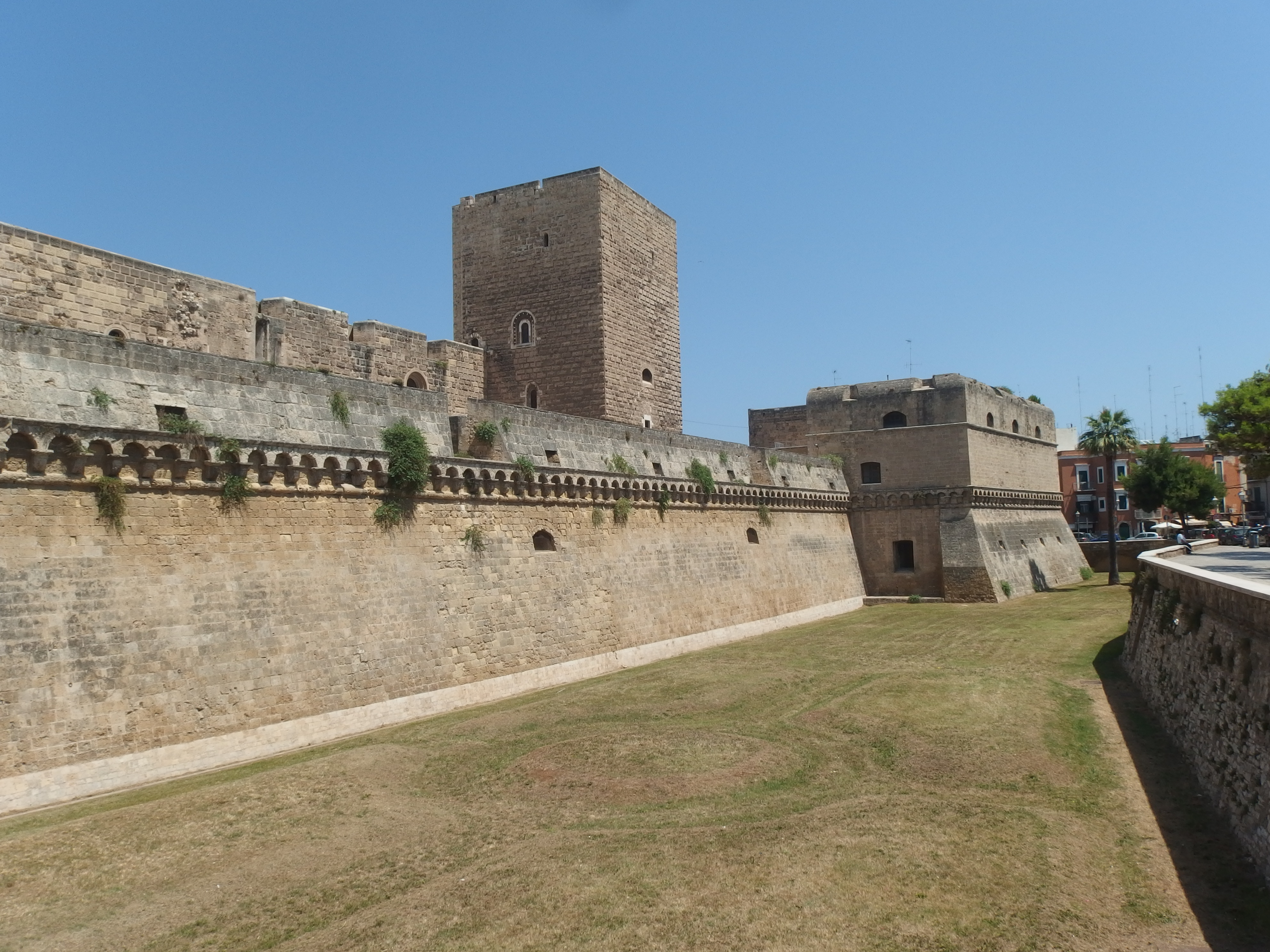
Castello Normanno-Svevo, Isabella's residence during her tenure as Duchess of Bari

Attacked by Louis XII and his allies (Pope Alexander VI and his son Cesare Borgia), betrayed by his cousin King Ferdinand II of Aragon who pretended to be his ally, King Frederick of Naples chose to deal with the French King, and in exchange for some monetary concessions (including the revenues of the County of Maine), he ceded his rights to the Neapolitan throne to Louis XII on 1 August 1501.

After her uncle's defeat, Isabella and her family found themselves imprisoned on the island of Ischia in the Tyrrhenian Sea. There, in 1501, her eight-year-old daughter Ippolita Maria died. After negotiations with the representatives of Spain, the Dowager Duchess of Milan obtained the titles of suo jure Duchess of Bari, Princess of Rossano and Lady of Ostuni, which Louis XII had denied to her son; ironically, Isabella now appeared as a usurper herself as Bari should have passed to Ercole Massimiliano, the son of Ludovico and Beatrice. Her acquisition of the Duchy appears to be a form of compensation for her previous struggles.

The ceremonial takeover of the lands took place in April 1502. Isabella then lived with her daughter Bona Maria in the Castello Normanno-Svevo, and her court there was one of splendour. She spent her spare time working on music and literature; the writer Amedeo Cornale was summoned to her court, which witnessed the printing of Bari's first book. Her administration greatly benefited the Duchy, which entered into a period of revival, refurbishment and cultural florescence, which it had not enjoyed under the earlier administration of Isabella's Aragonese relatives.

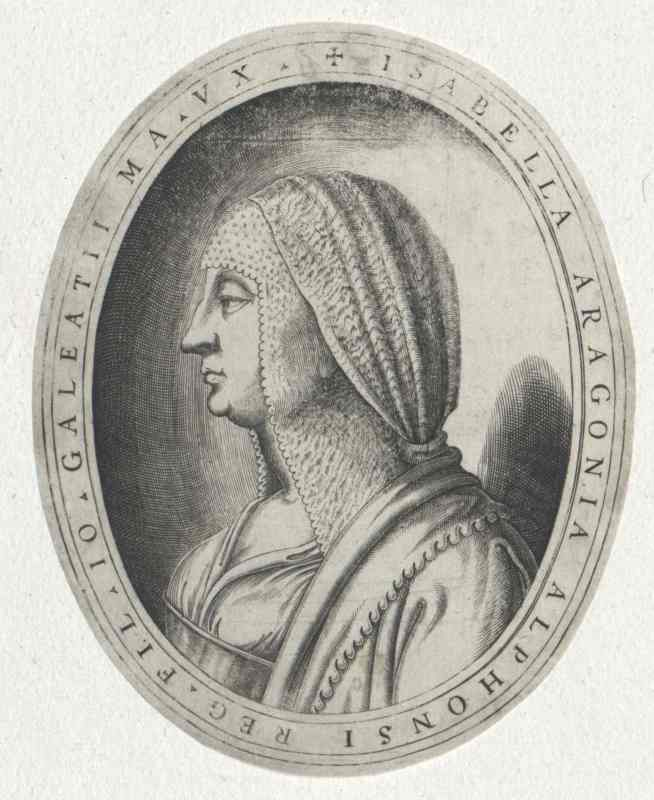
Engraving of Isabella. Austrian National Library, Innere Stadt, Vienna.

Keeping in mind her previous life experiences, Isabella also made it her priority to enhance the defences of the Castello Normanno-Svevo, ensuring that it was up to date with the form of warfare that had harmed Milan and Naples. This emphasis on security turned out to be well placed. In July 1502, Gonzalo Fernández de Córdoba distributed a small portion of his forces to Bari, under Isabella's protection. This led to the French considering an attack on Isabella's Duchy, some argued it would be an advantageous way of conducting war against the Spanish. However, this was avoided when ideals of chivalry were taken into consideration. Whilst Isabella may have avoided danger on account of her gender, it was a reminder that her hold on Bari was far from secure and her gender may not always excuse her. Aside from building up defences, the situation in Milan had taught the Duchess that political security was also essential; her will needed to be upheld at all times, never weakened or undermined. Therefore, she introduced more vigorous surveillance of public officials, ensuring that their notorious corruption was combated.

During the war between Spain and France, for security Isabella travelled for a time to Naples. She soon returned to Bari, taking with her the son of her half-brother Alfonso and Lucrezia Borgia, Rodrigo of Aragon, Duke of Bisceglie, who was given to her for her upbringing. The Duchess was on friendly terms with her nephew's mother, who sent Isabella numerous gifts. After taking over Bari, the Duchess took up administrative matters and the fight for the lost property. There were many poets and artists of the Renaissance at the Duchess's court. Isabella took care of the education of her remaining daughter Bona Maria, whose upbringing was led by Crisostomo Colonna and Antonio Galateo. She supported the development of education, music and literature in Bari. In 1506 she hosted her cousin Alfonso I d'Este, Duke of Ferrara, the third husband of Lucrezia Borgia. In 1513, she applied to the city council of Bari to raise salaries for public school teachers and to exempt them from taxes.

==== Daughter's illness and son's death ====
In 1510, Isabella's daughter, Bona Maria, fell seriously ill. The Duchess then asked the convent of Santa Maria della Nuova to pray for the health of the sick princess. After Bona Maria recovered, they both made a pilgrimage to the convent, where they offered thanksgiving gifts. In January 1512, the Duchess learned of the tragic death of her son Francesco Maria, who died after falling from a horse while hunting in Angoulême, France. In August of that year, Isabella's nephew and foster child, Rodrigo of Aragon, Duke of Bisceglie, died in Bari. After the death of her son, Isabella devoted herself entirely to raising her only surviving child, Bona Maria. Under her mother's direction, the princess received a humanist education, which included the teaching of statecraft.

Initially, Isabella desired for Bona Maria to wed her cousin Ercole Massimiliano Sforza (who stayed in Innsbruck at the court of Holy Roman Emperor Maximilian I) in the hope of uniting their two rival branches of the family, and also with the purpose to give her daughter power in Milan. For this purpose, Isabella asked the city authorities of Bari in 1515 to enact a dowry for Bona Maria. On 5 January, it was decided to pay the Duchess 18,000 ducats; however, Ercole Massimiliano was reluctant to marry, so Isabella sent her confidant to Rome to seek help there. At the end, Ercole Massimiliano's control over the Duchy of Milan proved too weak at this point and the French took it over once again in the aftermath of the Battle of Marignano on 13 September 1515. In Rome, plans were also made to marry Bona Maria with Prince Philip of Savoy, younger brother of Duke Charles III. Ultimately, none of these marriage plans came to fruition.

==== Daughter's marriage with King Sigismund I of Poland ====
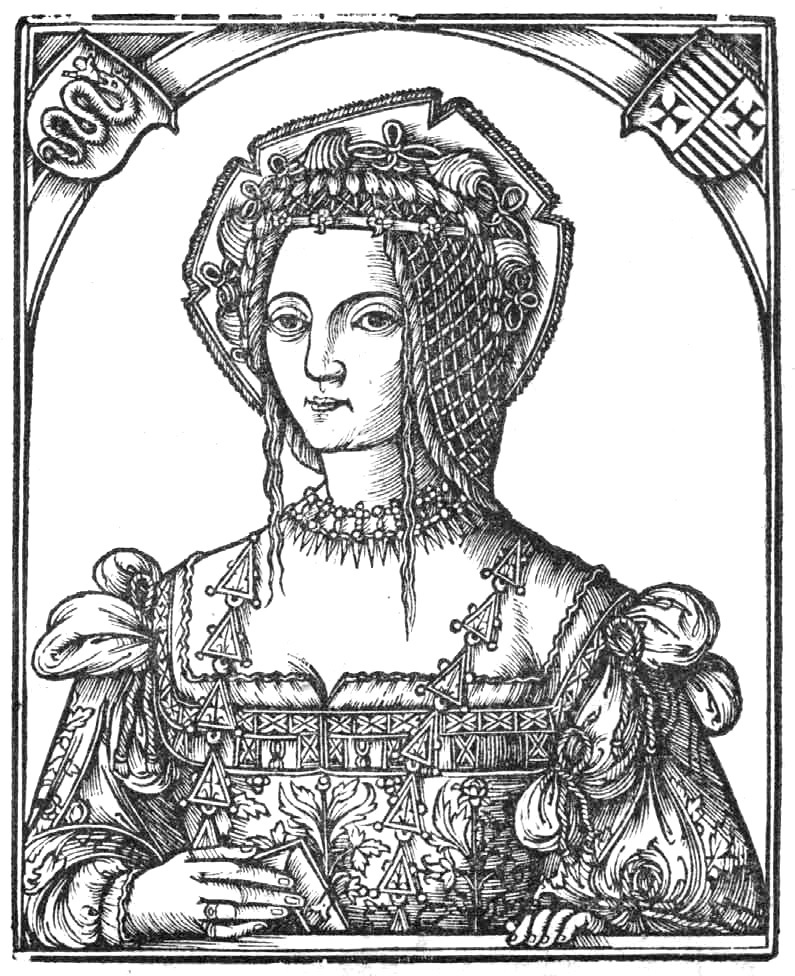
Princess Bona Maria, depicted here in the year that she married (1517). Extract from Decius I. L. De vetustatibus Polonorum liber I. De Jagellonum familia, liber II. De Sigismundi regis temporibus liber III. Kraków, 1521.

On 5 October 1515, Barbara Zápolya, wife of King Sigismund I the Old of Poland, died following complications after giving birth her second daughter. Without legitimate male offspring, it was expected that the Polish sovereign would remarry. The Zápolya family was opposed to the Habsburgs, something that Holy Roman Emperor Maximilian I was conscious of. In order to eliminate anti-Habsburg sentiments within Poland, Maximilian I requested that Sigismund I marry a bride selected by him. Bona Maria Sforza was on the list of selected candidates. Isabella then sent her daughter's tutor Crisostomo Colonna to Vienna to look after the princess's interests. As the other candidates were ruled out for various reasons, Sigismund I finally consented to marrying Bona Maria in the spring of 1517.

On 6 December 1517 Isabella participated in the marriage per procura between her daughter and the Polish King, held at Castel Capuano near Naples (for which the Duchess had to raise extra taxes in Bari to pay the expenses), in which the groom was represented by the castellan of Kalisz, Stanisław Ostroróg; many representatives of the Italian aristocracy were invited to the ceremony. The contract was signed on the day, according to which Isabella was to pay King Sigismund I 100,000 pure gold ducats, 50,000 of which would be paid shortly after Bona Maria's arrival in Poland, and the other half within the next two years. It was also stipulated that the Duchess could no longer sell her property, which Bona Maria was to inherit after her death. Isabella also covered her daughter's travel expenses to Kraków. On 11 December, representatives from the Duchy of Bari officially recognized Bona Maria as her mother's only heir and declared themselves the princess's vassals. Due to the cold winter, Isabella postponed her daughter's trip to Poland several times. Finally, on 3 February 1518, the Duchess said goodbye to her only surviving child, who was leaving Naples to go to Wawel Castle in Kraków. To commemorate her farewell to her daughter, Isabella had Bona Maria's foot carved in the stone and the inscription: Here the Polish Queen stood, when she said goodbye to Donna Isabella, her mother, the Duchess of Milan.

Like her mother, Bona Maria was known for her energetic personality; she was not afraid to openly disagree with her husband and acted as a patron to artists. However, unlike Isabella, she was able to build up her own political faction in her marital homeland.

==== Conflict over the inheritance of Joanna of Aragon, Queen of Naples ====
At the end of 1518, Isabella planned to travel to Poland to visit her daughter, who was in the last stages of her first pregnancy. (Note: Bona Maria's eldest child, born on 18 January 1519, was a daughter, named Isabella after her grandmother.) However, the Duchess did not arrive due to the death of her aunt, Dowager Queen Joanna of Naples, on 27 August of that year. Joanna bequeathed a large fortune to Isabella, which in part also belonged to King Charles I of Spain. In order to take over her aunt's bequest, the Duchess had to apply to the highest Neapolitan court. She asked for help from her son-in-law, who sent his secretary, Jan Dantyszek, to Spain. By helping Isabella, Sigismund I hoped that Bona Maria's dowry would be paid out sooner if the trial was won. When the matter was not settled, the Polish King sent to King Charles in April 1520 another ambassador, Hieronymus Łaski, but this mission also ended in failure. The opportunity to clarify the matter came when Dantyszek was to go directly to see Charles I. On the way, the royal secretary stopped in Spain, where on 24 February 1523 he discussed the inheritance of Isabella with Chancellor Gattinara. In July 1523, Sigismund I sent his secretary, Ludwik Decjusz, to Isabella, to help her in resolving the ongoing conflict.

=== Death ===
During her last years, Isabella saw her daughter become a mother to four of her six children: Isabella (born 18 January 1519; by marriage Queen of Hungary and Croatia), Sigismund Augustus (born 1 August 1520; later King of Poland and Grand Duke of Lithuania as last male monarch from the Jagiellonian dynasty), Sophia (born 13 July 1522; by marriage Duchess of Brunswick-Lüneburg) and Anna (born 18 October 1523; later Queen regnant of Poland and Grand Duchess regnant of Lithuania, and by marriage Princess of Transylvania). Not giving up on uniting the rival branches of the Sforza family, Isabella sent envoys to Poland to propose marriage of her eldest granddaughter, the younger Isabella, to Francesco II Sforza, newly installed Duke of Milan. However, Sigismund I refused as Milan was contested and Francesco II's hold was tenuous.

Isabella didn't live long enough to see the resolution of her aunt's inheritance. At the beginning of October 1523 she fell seriously ill. In early February 1524, the disease worsened and the Duchess died a few days later, on 11 February, aged 53. Initially buried in Bari, her remains were returned to Naples and buried in San Domenico Maggiore. On the sarcophagus of Isabella there is a quatrain wrote by certain Hieronymus Sforza, which called her a descendant of a hundred kings. The inscription alluded to the antiquity of the Duchess' family, which on the distaff side descended from Charlemagne.

In 2012, anthropologists excavated the body of Isabella, and concluded that she had syphilis. Her teeth had a high level of mercury, which was used (ineffectively) to treat syphilis, and had given a black color to the tooth enamel, most of which had been removed by abrading. They concluded that she was poisoned by her own medicine.

== Issue ==
By her marriage, Isabella had four children:

- Francesco Maria Sforza (1491–1512), earl of Pavia; died in France at aged 21, falling from a horse.
- Ippolita Maria Sforza (1493–1501); died aged 8, in Ischia.
- Bona Maria Sforza (1494–1557). Only surviving child, she married Polish king Sigismund I the Old, with issue of eight children.
- Bianca Maria Sforza (1495–1496), died at aged 2.

== Appearance and personality ==
Many historians, especially nineteenth-century, spoke of a phantom beauty of Isabella, facilitated in this by the scarcity of her certain portraits and by the undoubted beauty of those who, although traditionally attributed, clearly do not depict her. Among these there were those who even went so far as to attribute to envy for her beauty the heated hostility of Beatrice d'Este towards her cousin: "Beatrice could not suffer that the beauty of Isabella was praised in her presence, imagining thus reproaching her for her ugliness". Indeed, if Beatrice was always described by her contemporaries as pretty, although not of exceptional beauty, contemporary sources agree in defining Isabella as unpleasant.

Ambassador Giacomo Trotti, always frank in his judgments, in describing Isabella on the occasion of her wedding, turns the concept around with a polite euphemism, writing to Duke Ercole d'Este that "this new Duchess is dark-faced and not very beautiful", but immediately states that, beyond the physical aspect, she is beautiful inside: "she has a kind and beautiful personality". Conversely, "el Duca [Gian Galeazzo] is beautiful and delicious". Ambrogio da Corte, one of the courtiers charged with leading her from Naples to Milan, even describes her as "ugly, black, cross-eyed, too much made up, and her breath stinks": probably exaggerates, but Isabella did indeed have a dark complexion, a thick and slightly hooked nose, the swollen cheeks typical of the Aragonese, and it is also possible that she had inherited a certain degree of strabismusfrom her father, since Alfonso II was called il Guercio.

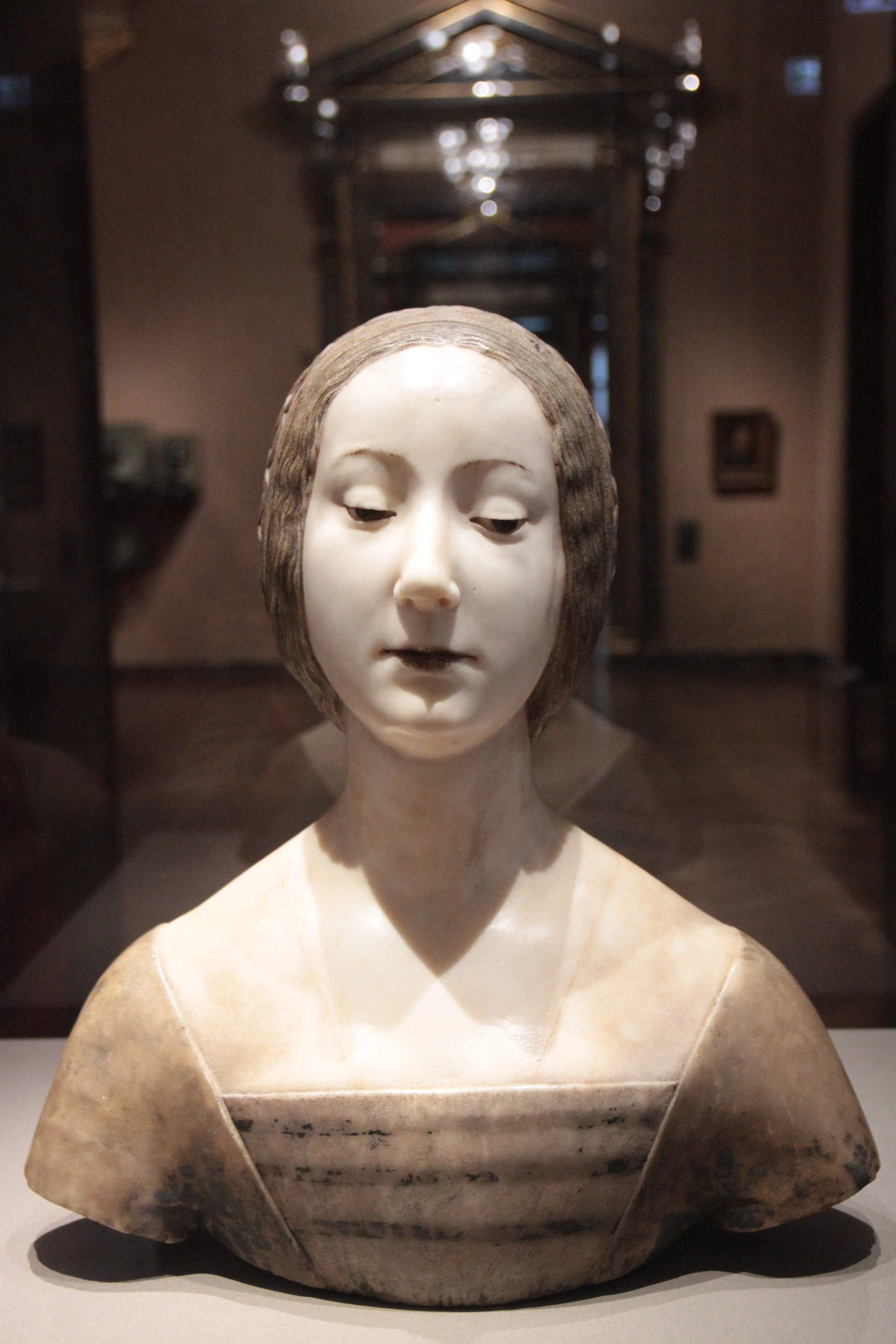
Like the other women in the family, Isabella also wore the coazzone, that is the long Spanish braid falling behind the shoulders, so the traditional identification with the female bust of Francesco Laurana is not credible, which moreover has a small and straight nose, very different from that present in the certain portraits of Isabella.

Ludovico Sforza considered her of a very bad nature: proud, envious, malignant and ungrateful, capable of all sorts of evil and cruelty towards those she hated. No doubt Isabella inherited from her Aragonese relatives the indomitable pride and combativeness, and was not afraid to resort to unfair means - such as poison - to achieve her goals, but her biographers agree in attributing to her a certain will for justice and a certain capacity for good governance during the years of maturity in Bari, Although not separated from some abuse of power against citizens: some of these accused her of "terribilitate et potentia" because she used to use "violentie et fraude".

== Loves ==
Although already at the time of the wedding, in 1492, there was talk of a certain understanding between Isabella and a beautiful young Milanese, there is no news of her lovers except during her widowhood. The story appears unclear: a courtier, Moroleto (or Morello) Ponzone, told the Duchess of Ferrara that, meeting one evening the Dukes of Bari and those of Milan with the Marquise of Mantua and other friends playing cards, Isabella found herself sitting in front of "a beautiful corsiero", in such a way that "she always looked at him" and "she had no mind in the game except that courser", so that Moroleto, moved with compassion, took "a little presumption" and "with honesty and good words" took him away, keeping him engaged in chatter until the game ended and everyone went to sleep.

Achille Dina, Isabella's biographer, on the basis of the metaphors present, interpreted the letter in question as if Moroleto were talking about a horse (corsiero is in fact the term commonly used for battle horses) and commented: "it must have been a steed of great value of Beatrice", consequently interpreted Isabella's insistent gaze as envy, as a "trouble in seeing herself surpassed by Beatrice even in the mounts". However, the term is sometimes used metaphorically to indicate not the beast, but the one who rides it; moreover, Achille Dina strangely omits the final part of the letter, that is, the one from which it is understood to be a man, and not an animal, since otherwise it would not be possible to understand why Moroleto had to spend the rest of the evening conversing with a horse.

Retired to live in the kingdom of Naples, Isabella had as her lover the leader Prospero Colonna, to whom "she gave herself in prey, enjoying and tickling lovingly almost every night". So, "having Isabella broken the brake on lasciviousness and, of modesty that she was before, became immodest", she also took as a lover the young Giosuè de Ruggiero, a man of the low nobility born in the farmhouse of Marigliano, who had been amasio of the same Prospero Colonna. The latter, having learned of the tresca and jealous of his lover, had Giosuè seriously injured in an ambush by some of his soldiers.

For this event Isabella deprived Prospero Colonna of her favours and continued to entertain herself with Giosuè. Then, having retired to Bari, and having Giosuè remain in Naples, Isabella, although she was past forty, took as a lover the thirty-year-old Alessandro Pignatelli, lord of Toritto, who with his wife Laura della Marra already had many children. Among these was the eldest son Ettore Pignatelli, who several years later became the lover of Bona, daughter of Isabella herself.

== Legacy ==
Isabella was first suggested as the subject of Leonardo da Vinci's Mona Lisa in 1979. This presupposes that the painting took place in the 1490s, during da Vinci's Milanese period. However, the painting has officially been dated as later, likely ruling Isabella out as the subject. Additionally, Isabella was never recognised during her lifetime as the subject of the painting. Those who viewed the Mona Lisa and were acquainted with Isabella such as Luigi d'Aragona and his secretary, Antonio de Beatis, did not make a connection.

She appears in Hella Haasse's 1952 novel The Scarlet City, depicted during her time as Duchess of Bari with mention of her difficult early life.

Isabella of Aragon House of Trastámara Born: 2 October 1470 Died: 11 February 1524
Italian nobility
Preceded by Bona of Savoy	Duchess consort of Milan; 1489–1494	Succeeded by Beatrice d'Este
Titles in pretence
Preceded by Ferdinand II of Naples	Brienne claim 1496–1524	Succeeded by Bona Sforza
