= Francesco Sforza (disambiguation) =

Francesco Sforza (1401–1466), was the first Duke of Milan of the Sforza dynasty.

Francesco Sforza may also refer to:

- Francesco Sforza (il Duchetto) (1491–1512), son of Gian Galeazzo Maria Sforza
- Francesco II Sforza (1495–1535), son of Ludovico il Moro and last Duke of Milan of the Sforza dynasty
- Francesco Sforza (cardinal) (1562–1624), cardinal of Santa Romana Chiesa
