= Ippolita Maria Sforza (1493–1501) =

- Born: 26 January 1493 or 13 February 1494; Milan, Italy
- Died: 1501 (aged 7–8); Ischia, Italy
- Noble family: Sforza
- Father: Gian Galeazzo Sforza of Milan
- Mother: Isabella of Naples

Ippolita Maria Sforza (26 January 1493 – 1501) was the daughter of Gian Galeazzo Sforza of Milan and Isabella of Naples.

She was also the niece of Bianca Maria Sforza, who in 1493 had married Holy Roman Emperor Maximilian I. She was named after her maternal grandmother, Ippolita Maria Sforza.

She was engaged to Ferdinand of Aragón, Duke of Calabria.
