= Gian Galeazzo Sforza =

Duke of Milan (1469–1494)

- Portrait by Giovanni Ambrogio de Predis, c. 1483

Duke of Milan
- Reign: 26 December 1476 – 21 October 1494
- Predecessor: Galeazzo Maria Sforza
- Successor: Ludovico Sforza
- Born: 20 June 1469; Abbiategrasso
- Died: 21 October 1494 (aged 25); Pavia
- Spouse: Isabella of Naples (m. 1489)
- Issue: Francesco Sforza; Ippolita Maria Sforza; Bona, Queen of Poland; Bianca Maria Sforza
- House: Sforza
- Father: Galeazzo Maria Sforza
- Mother: Bona of Savoy

Gian Galeazzo Sforza (20 June 1469 – 21 October 1494), also known as Giovan Galeazzo Sforza, was the sixth Duke of Milan. He was the father of Bona Maria Sforza, who later became Queen of Poland. He died in 1494 aged 25 and was succeeded by his uncle, Ludovico Sforza.

== Early life ==
Born in Abbiategrasso, Gian Galeazzo was son of Galeazzo Maria Sforza and Bona of Savoy. He was only seven years old when in 1476 his father, Galeazzo Maria, was assassinated and he became the Duke of Milan. His uncle, Ludovico Sforza, acted as regent to the young duke, but quickly wrested all power from him and became the de facto ruler of Milan. Ludovico imprisoned Gian Galeazzo and later became the duke after Gian Galeazzo's death, which was widely viewed as suspicious.

== Marriage and issue ==
In February 1489, Gian Galeazzo married his cousin Isabella of Naples-Aragon.

They had:

- Francesco Maria Sforza (1491–1512), Count of Pavia;
- Ippolita Maria Sforza (1493–1501);
- Bona Maria Sforza (1494–1557). Only surviving child, she married Sigismund I the Old, with issue.

== Death ==
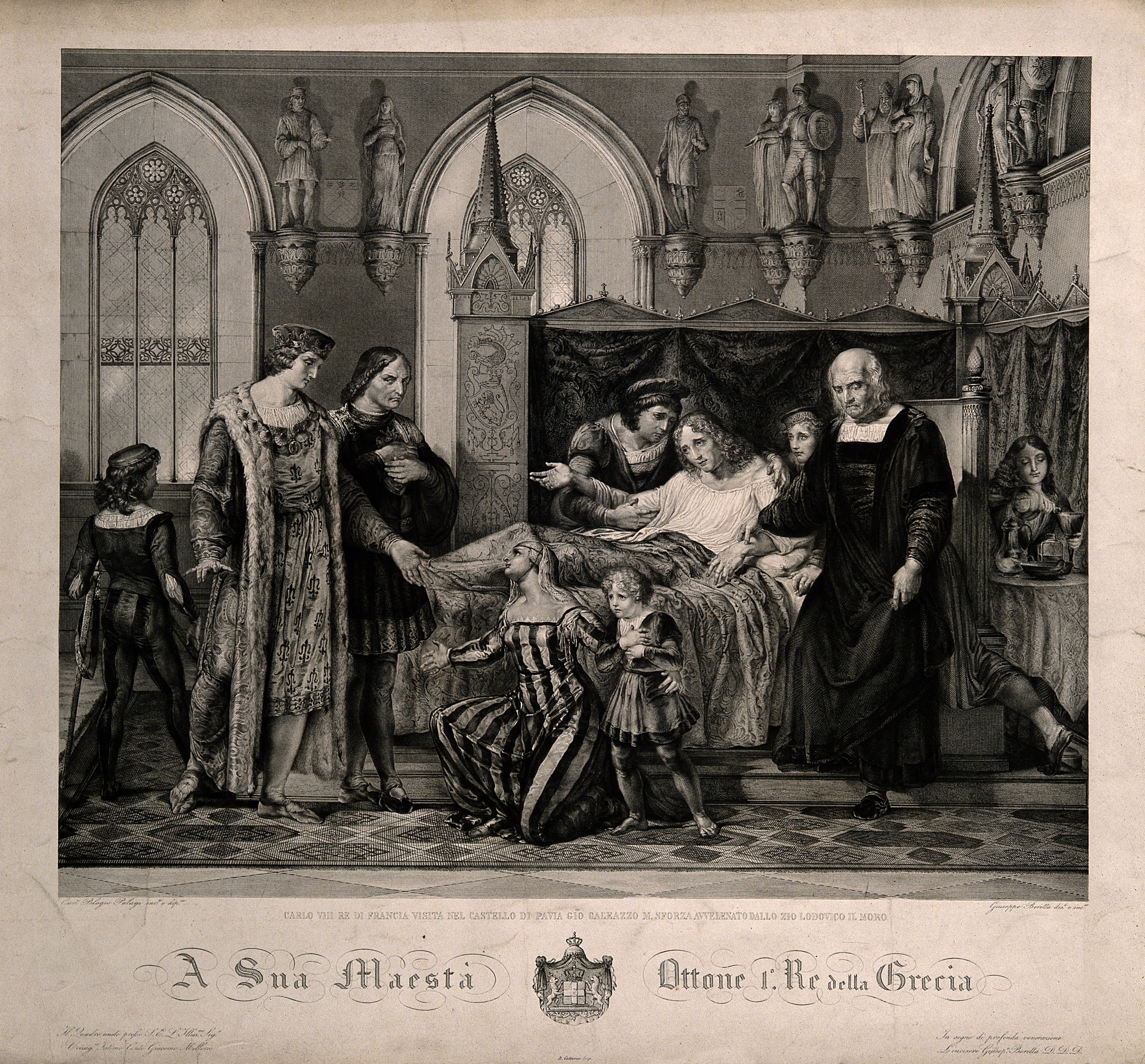
Charles VIII visiting the deathbed of Gian Galazzo Sforza at the Palazzo Ducale.

In 1491 Ludovico Sforza had Gian Galeazzo Sforza and his wife Isabella of Aragon transferred to the Visconti Castle of Pavia where they created a brilliant court. Gian Galeazzo died in 1494 in the Visconti Castle, the summer home of the Visconti and Sforza families. During that time, he received a visit from Charles VIII of France. According to the Italian historian Francesco Guicciardini in his History of Italy (Italian: La Historia di Italia), he was poisoned by his uncle, Ludovico il Moro.

The rumor was widespread that Giovan Galeazzo's death had been provoked by immoderate coitus; nevertheless, it was widely believed throughout Italy that he had died not through natural illness nor as a result of incontinence, but had been poisoned … one of the royal physicians … asserted that he had seen manifest signs of it. Nor was there anyone who doubted that if it had been poison, it had been administered through his uncle Ludovico Sforza's machinations…

== Ancestry ==
Ancestors of Gian Galeazzo Sforza

16. Giovanni Attendolo
8. Muzio Attendolo Sforza
17. Elisa Petraccini
4. Francesco I Sforza
9. Lucia da Torsciano
2. Galeazzo Maria Sforza
20. Gian Galeazzo Visconti
10. Filippo Maria Visconti
21. Caterina Visconti
5. Bianca Maria Visconti
22. Ambrogio del Maino
11. Agnese del Maino
1. Gian Galeazzo Sforza
24. Amadeus VII, Count of Savoy
12. Antipope Felix V
25. Bonne of Berry
6. Louis, Duke of Savoy
26. Philip II, Duke of Burgundy
13. Mary of Burgundy
27. Margaret III, Countess of Flanders
3. Bona of Savoy
28. James I of Cyprus
14. Janus of Cyprus
29. Helvis of Brunswick
7. Anne of Cyprus
30. John I, Count of La Marche
15. Charlotte of Bourbon
31. Catherine of Vendôme

== Sources ==
- Burckhardt, Jacob (1878). The Civilization of the Renaissance in Italy. University of Toronto – Robarts Library: Vienna Phaidon Press. p. 23.
- Hand, Joni M. (2013). Women, Manuscripts and Identity in Northern Europe, 1350-1550. Routledge.
- Palos, Joan-Lluis (2016). "Eleonora Alvarez de Toledo (1522-62)". In Palos, Joan-Lluis; Sanchez, Magdalena S. (eds.). Early Modern Dynastic Marriages and Cultural Transfer. Routledge. pp. 165–188.

Italian nobility
Preceded by Galeazzo Maria Sforza	Duke of Milan; 1476–1494	Succeeded by Ludovico Sforza
