= Castello Normanno-Svevo (Bari) =

Castle in Bari, Italy

Norman-Swabian Castle
- Castello Normanno-Svevo
- Bari, Apulia, Italy
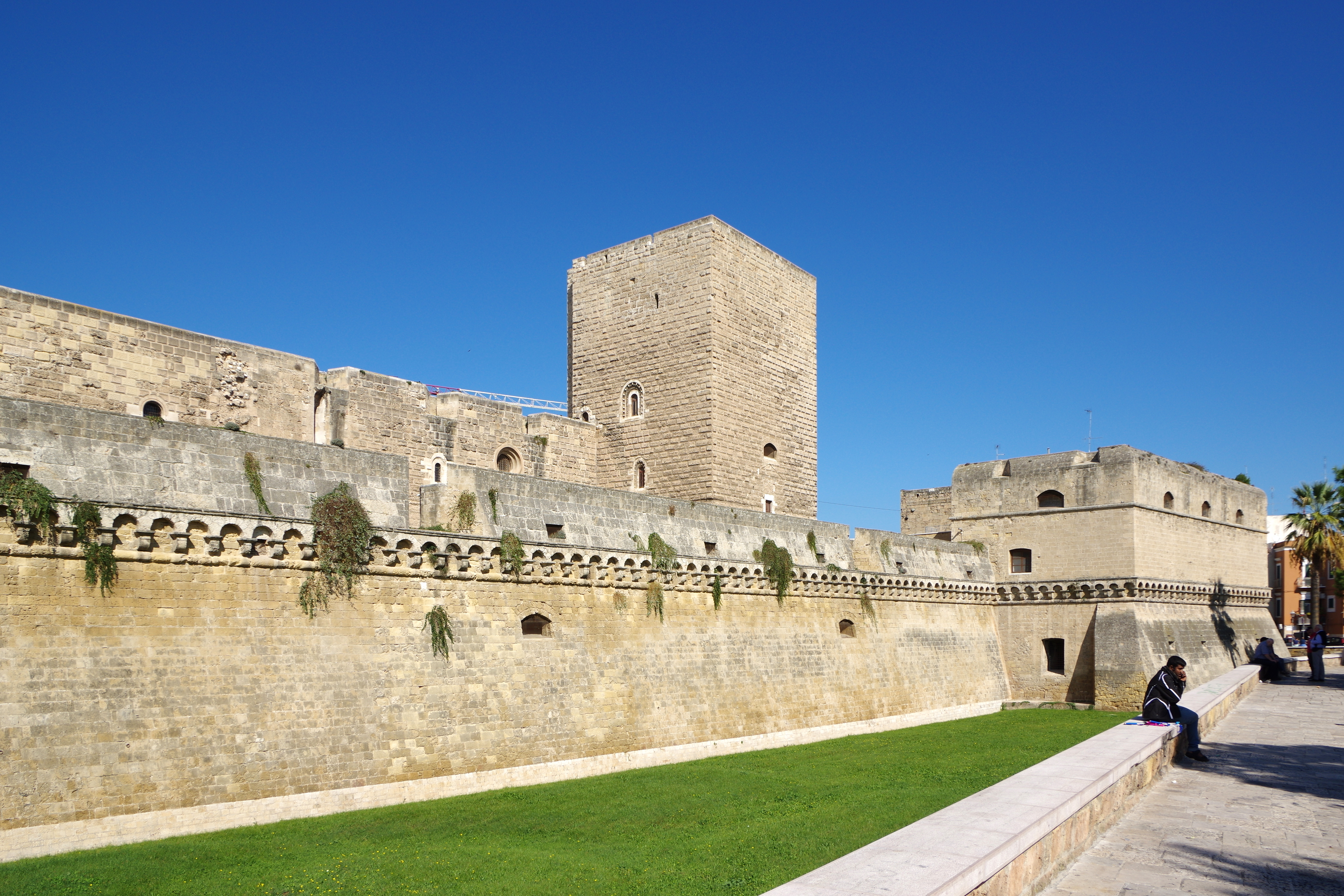
- Western ramparts of the castle

Site information
- Open to the public: yes

Location
- Coordinates: 41°7′43″N 16°51′59″E

Site history
- Built: 1132
- Built by: Roger II, rebuilt by Frederick II

The Castello Normanno-Svevo ("Norman-Swabian Castle"), also known as the u Castídde in the Barese dialect, is a castle in the Apulian city of Bari, Italy.

Built around 1132 by the Norman king Roger II, the building is now used for exhibitions.

== History ==
Probably built in 1132 by King Roger II, the building was destroyed in 1156 by King William I of Sicily, and later rebuilt and reinforced in 1233 by Frederick II, then King of Sicily.

During the Angevin domination, it underwent several transformations. After being acquired by Duke Ferdinand of Aragon, it was donated to the Sforza family and eventually passed to Bona Sforza, Queen of Poland.

Following Bona's death, the property returned to the King of Naples and was subsequently converted into a prison and military barracks.

The castle is surrounded by a moat on all sides, except the northern section, which was bordering the sea and can be accessed from the bridge and the gate on the southern side. It is mainly composed of the Aragon walls and the main Hohenstaufen tower, and is currently used for exhibitions.

According to the tradition, in 1221 Frederick II met St. Francis of Assisi in this castle. According to tradition, Frederick had a courtesan sent to Francis's room and watched through a peephole to see what would happen. When Francis sent the woman away, Frederick was impressed with his principles; the two spent the rest of the night in conversation. This story is not confirmed beyond doubt, but it is considered believable.

== Gallery ==
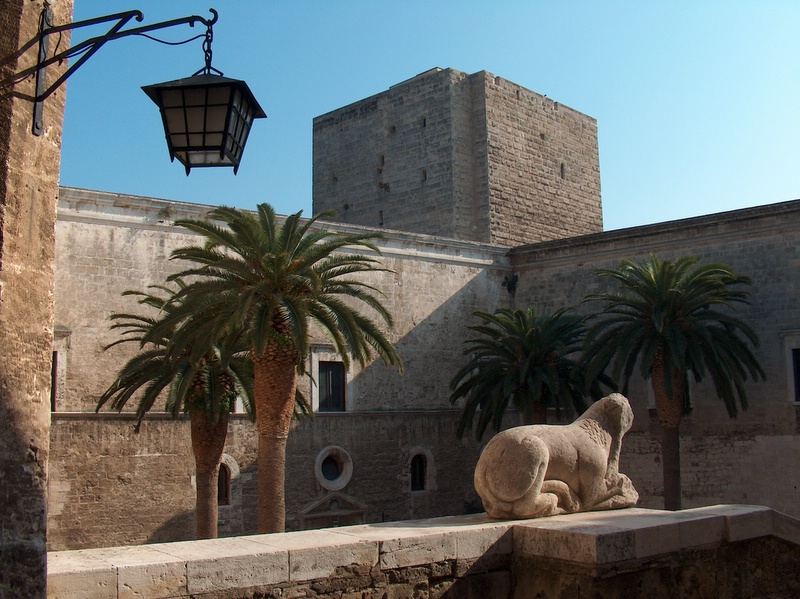
Courtyard

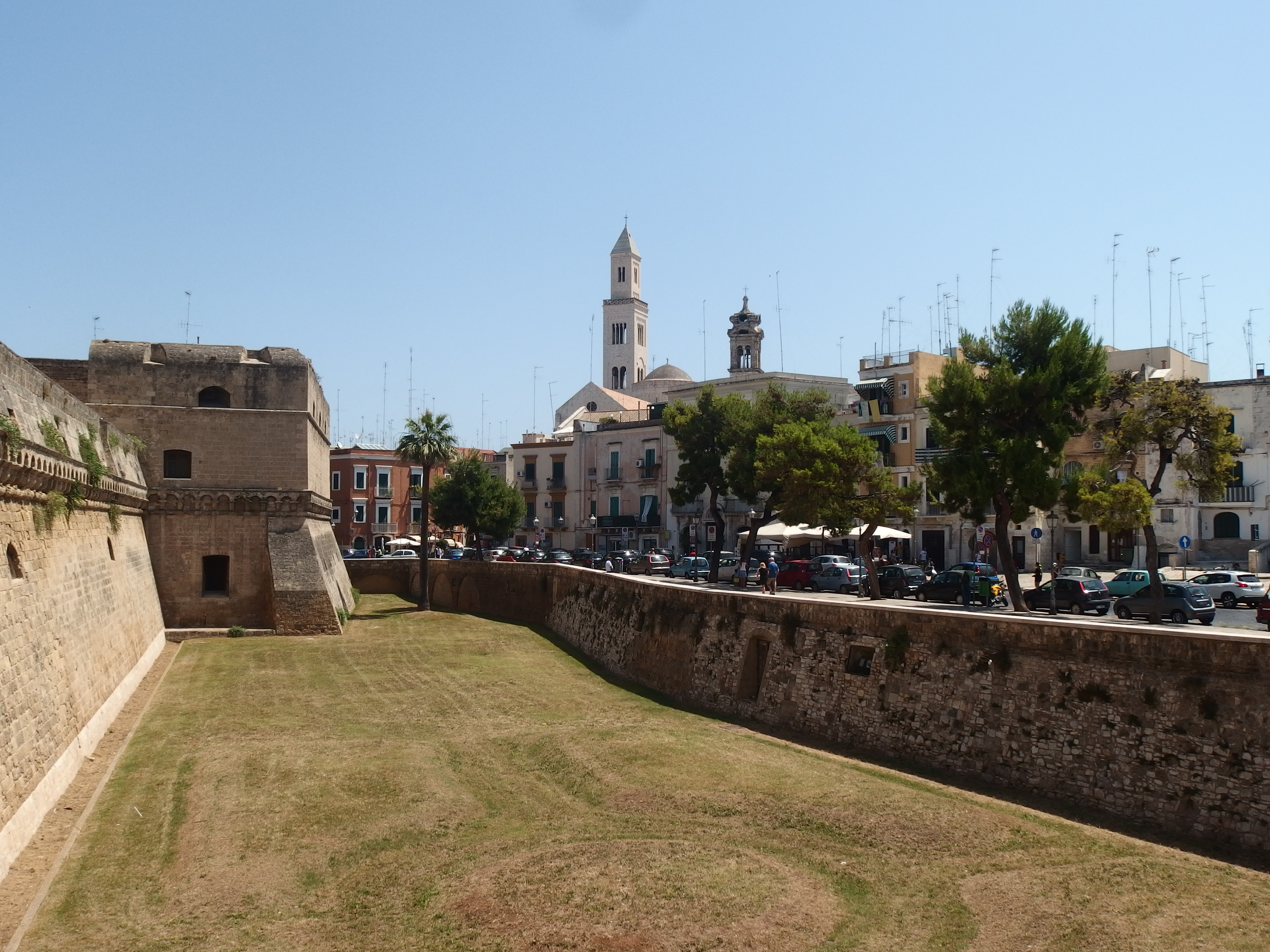
Old Town

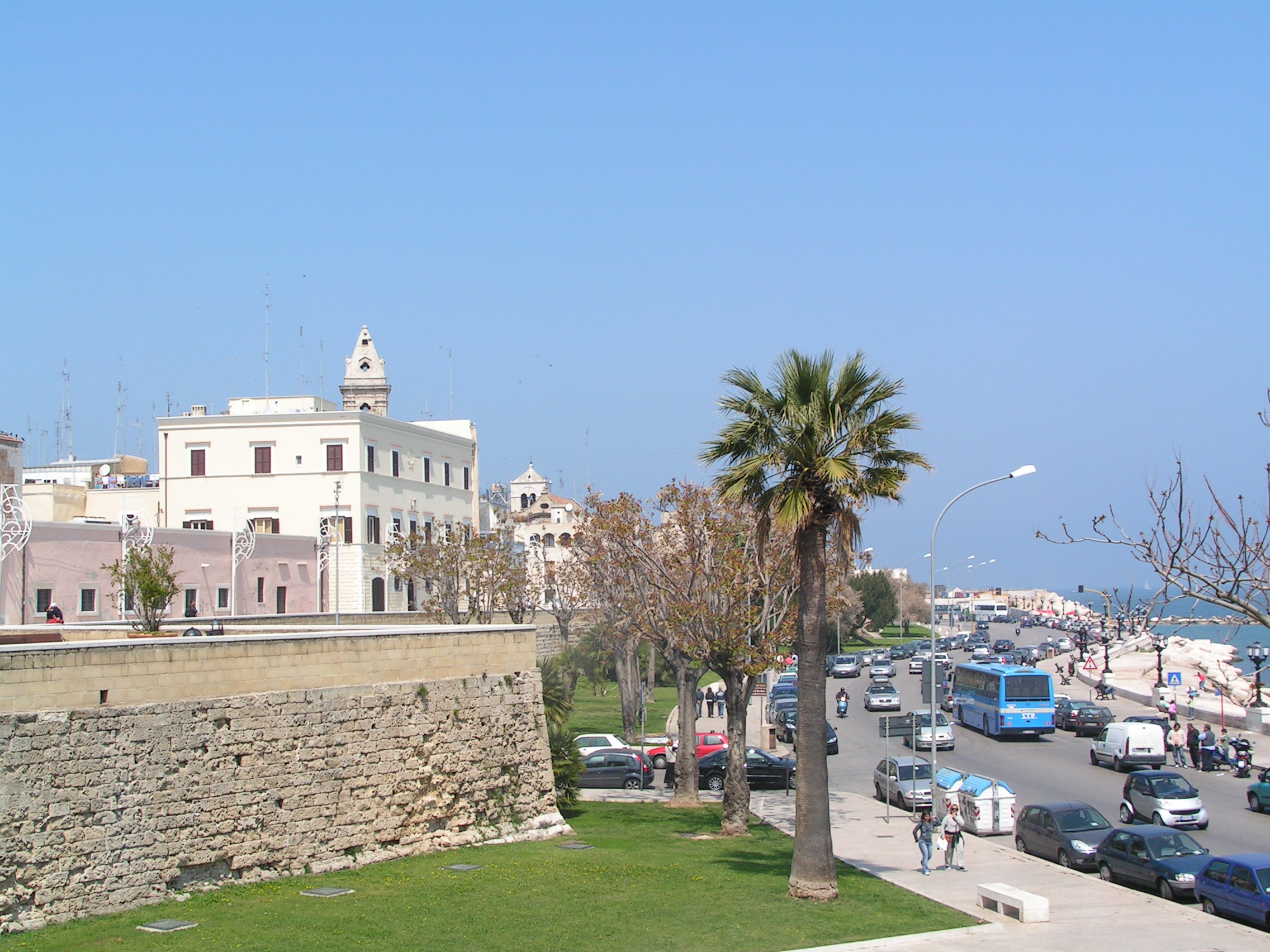
Seaside

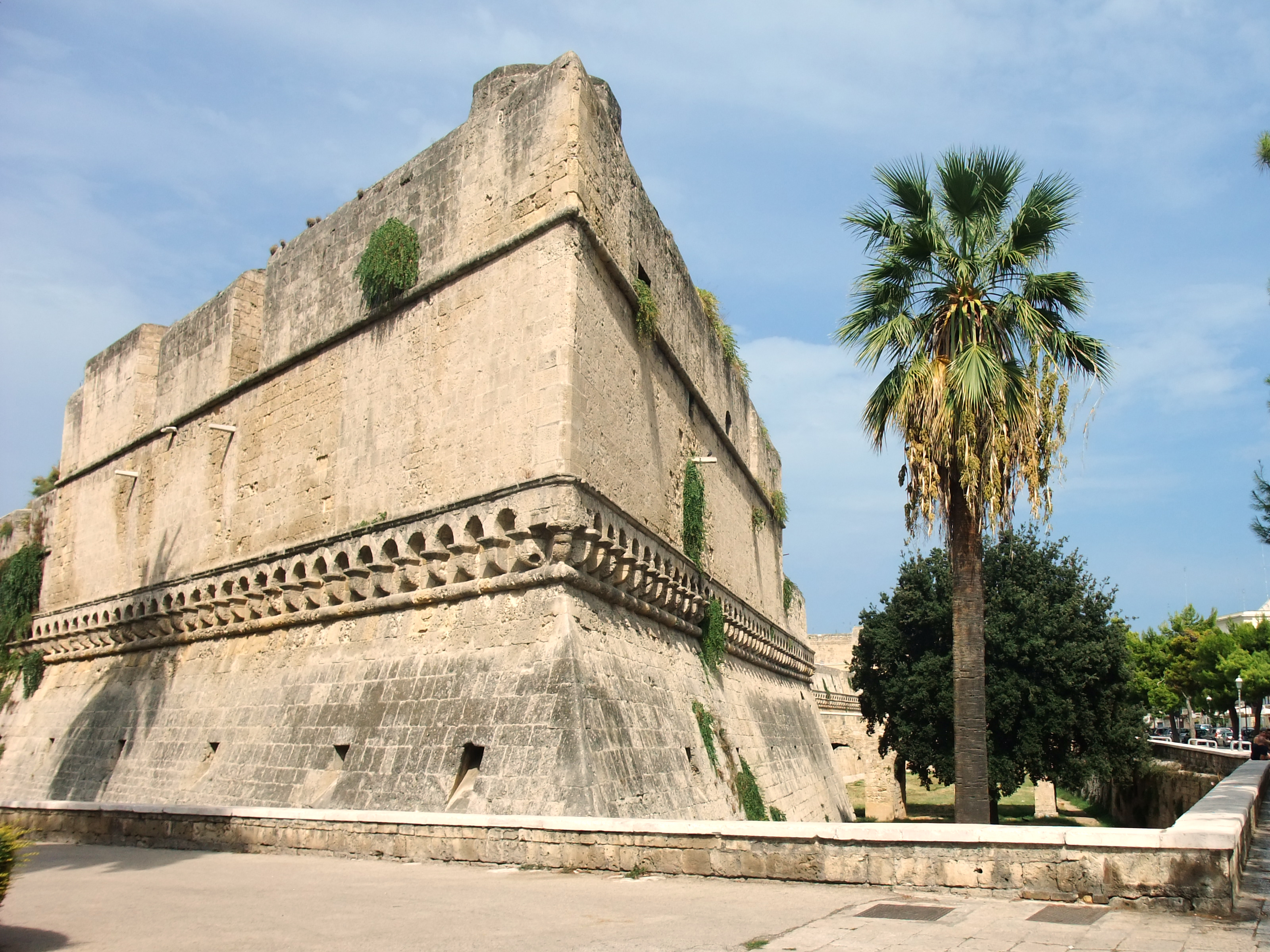

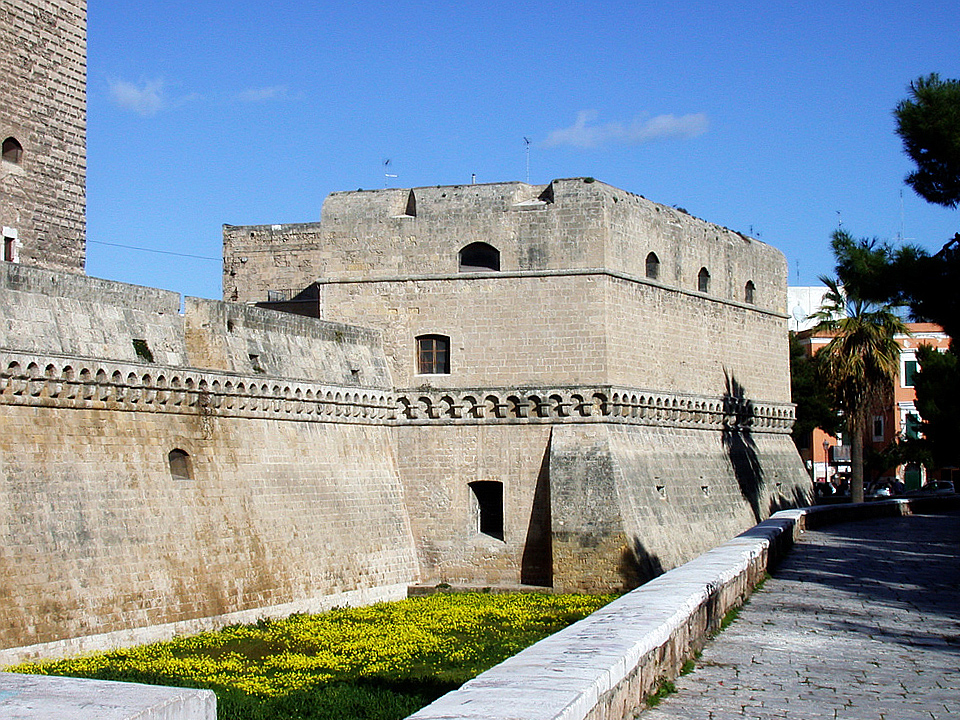

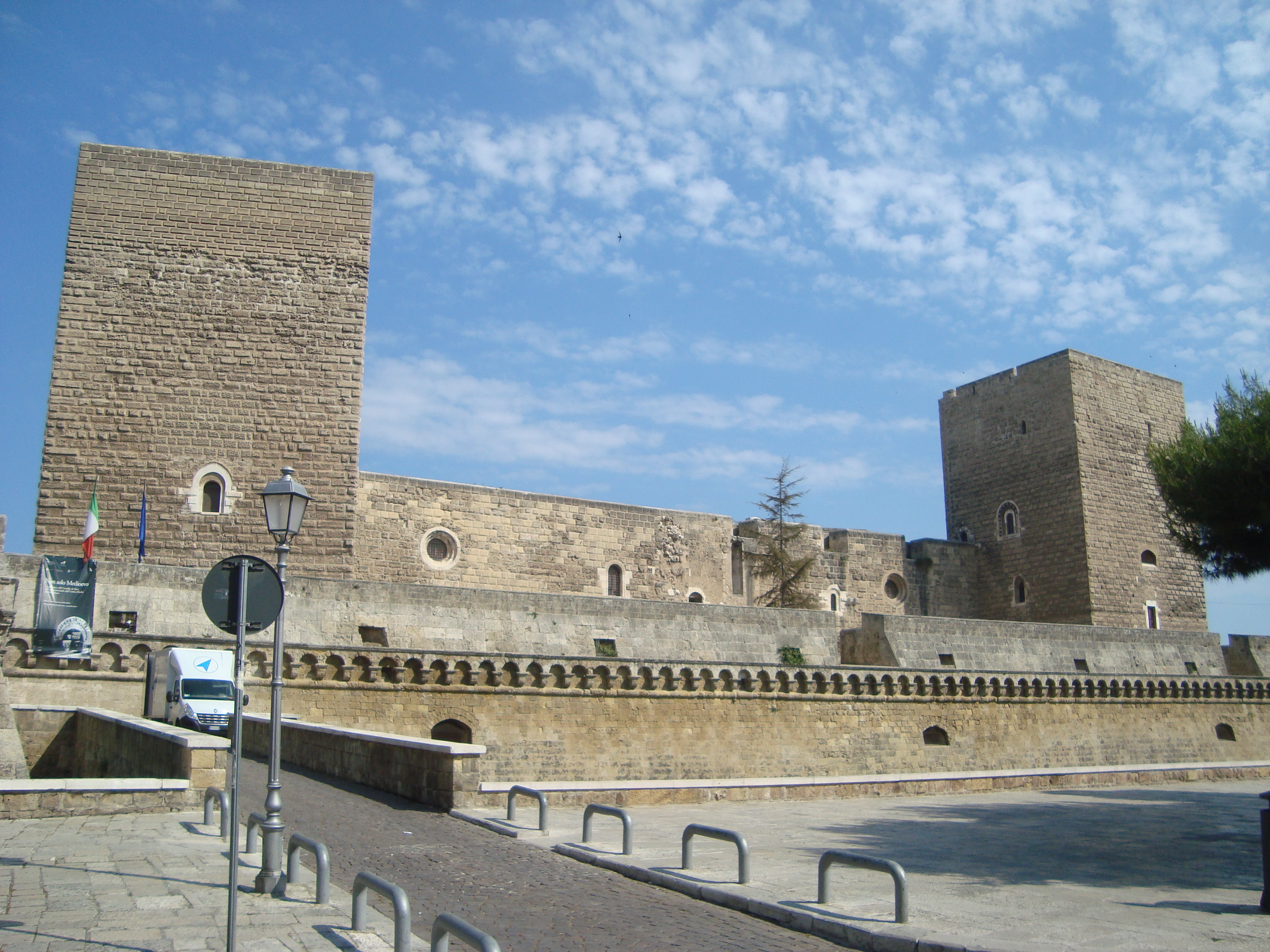
