= Antonio de Ferraris =

Italian scholar and humanist

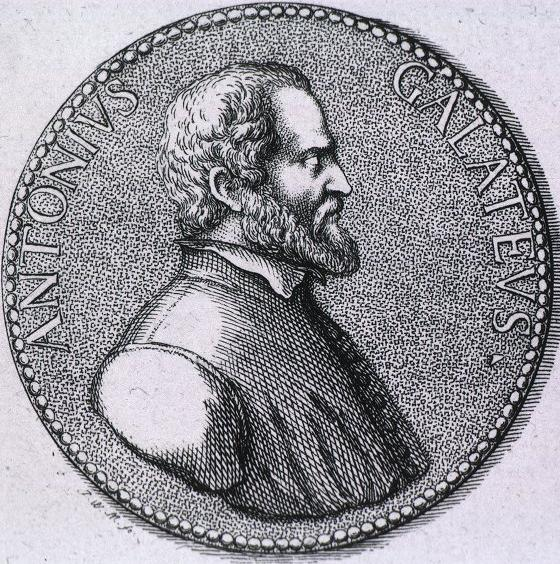
- A portrait of Antonio de Ferraris.
- Born: Antonio de Ferraris; 1444; Galatone, Apulia, Kingdom of Naples, Southern Italy
- Died: 1517 (aged 72–73); Lecce, Apulia, Kingdom of Naples
- Occupations: Humanist, Philosopher, Doctor, Academic,
- Writing career
- Notable work: De situ Japigiae
- Movement: Italian Renaissance

Antonio de Ferraris (Latin: Antonius de Ferraris, Greek: Ἀντώνιος Φεράρις; c. 1444 – 12 November 1517), also known by his epithet Galateo (Latin: Galateus, Greek: Γαλάτειος), was an Italian scholar, academic, doctor and humanist, of Greek ethnicity.

== Life ==
Antonius De Ferraris was born in 1444 in Galatone, located in Salento, in the province of Lecce (Apulia, in southern Italy) to a Greek family. Both his great-grandfather and grandfather were priests in the Eastern Orthodox Church and were fluent in both Greek and Latin literature. His father was also fluent in both Greek and Latin. His family was part of the historical Greek community of Southern Italy. He later wrote of his pride to be descended from Greek ancestors and priests and of the Greek traditions of his province proclaiming: "We are not ashamed of our race, Greeks we are, and we glory in it"

He was commonly called “il Galateo", an epithet he took from the city of his origin, Galatone. He used the nickname in almost every document, and the name was also inherited by his children and grandchildren; it ultimately replaced his original family name of “De Ferraris”.

After receiving his education from a maternal uncle who was abbot of the monastery of St. Nicola Pergoleto, Galateus was sent to study in the Gymnasium of Nardò, a centre of theological culture which also taught the humanities. Here he learned Greek and Latin texts, and hereinafter guidelines on philosophical and medical matters which came to characterize his cultural journey.

At sixteen, he went to Naples on Etiquette for the first time, in order to pursue studies in medicine and philosophy and then to practice as a doctor. In the following years, he returned to Naples several times, and received medical training and studies of humanism from some of the leading cultural representatives, including Antonio Beccadelli, Giovanni Pontano and Giacomo Sannazaro.

Galateus first approached the cultural environments of Catalan-Aragonese Naples in the 1460s and by 1471 was part of the Accademia Pontaniana, and during that period he became friends with the Venetian humanist Ermolao Barbaro. This student shared the method of investigation, the distrust of the sterile disputes of philosophers over the Alps, and he argued the need to read the classics in bare text, without the use of exegetical apparatus.

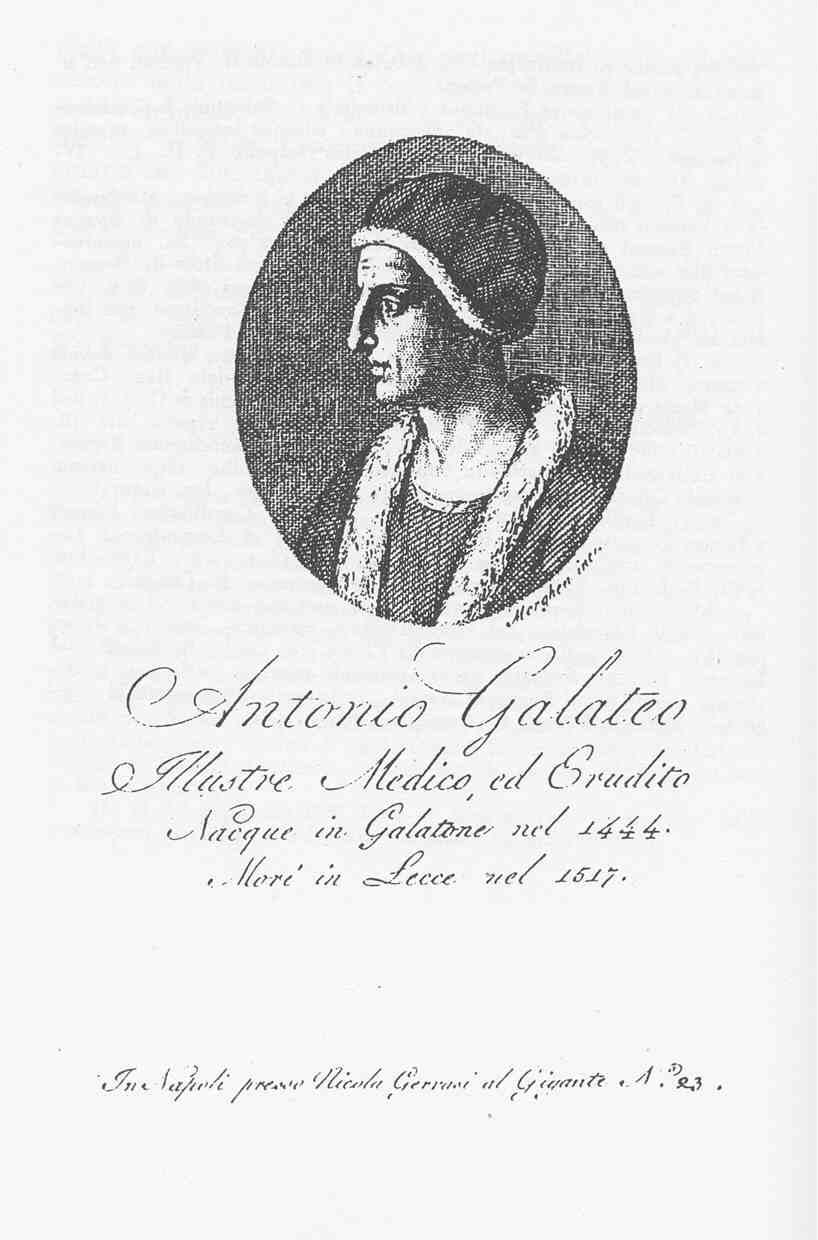
A print engraving of Antonio Ferrari Galateo

On 3 August 1474, Galateus received his “Privilegium artibus et medicine” under the guidance of Girolamo Castelli in the Studio of Ferrara. Following this, Galateus alternated his residence more or less between Naples, Gallipoli and Lecce. In the decade of 1470-1480, Galateus lived more permanently in Salento, where in 1478 he married Maria Lubelli dei baroni of Sanarica, and together they had five children: Antonino, Betta, Galieno, Lucrezia and Francesca. In 1480-81, during the Ottoman invasion of Otranto, Lecce, Galateus took refuge in the countryside and spent long periods in the villa he had purchased near Trepuzzi, where he could concentrate on his study and contemplation. Galateus observed how the inhabitants of Kallipoli (Gallipoli in Apulia) as still conversing in their original Greek mother tongue, he indicated that the Greek classical tradition had remained alive in this region of Italy and that the population is probably of Lacedaemonian (Spartan) stock.

In 1490, he once again returned to Naples at the invitation of King Ferdinand of Aragon, who offered him a job as a court doctor. He associated with Giovanni Pontano. It was during this time that the French invaded under king Charles VIII. The fall of the Catalan-Aragonese dynasty followed, and King Ferdinand of Aragon, a friend of Galatues, was exiled. Accusations of malice were made against him, thus motivating Galatues to farewell the Neapolitan academics and return permanently to Salento.

Galateus tried to revive him education lessons in the Accademia lupiensis in Lecce or Bari in the small court of Isabella of Aragon, daughter of Alfonso II of Naples, there he exchanged letters in later years with the latest generation of academics including Belisario Acquaviva, Pietro Summonte, Crisostomo.

In 1510, Galateus visited Pope Julius II in Rome with a manuscript copy of the donation Constantine extracted from the library of San Nicola di Casole in Otranto. Galateus returned to Salento for the final time, where he spent his last years between Gallipoli and Lecce. And in Lecce, in his home indicated epigraph “Apollini Aesculapio et Musis”. Antonio died in Lecce in his native province of Otranto on 12 November 1517.

== Literary works ==
The most important of de Ferraris' works is the De situ Japigiae, written between 1506 and 1511 but first printed in 1558 in Basel at the expense of the Marquis of Oria Giovan Bernardino Bonifacio. Reprinted in Naples in 1624, it amended some critical steps toward the Catholic Church hierarchy. Other editions and translations into various languages followed.

== See also ==
- Byzantine scholars in Renaissance
- Griko language
