= Francesco Sforza (il Duchetto) =

Duke of Milan (1491–1512)

Francesco Sforza "il Duchetto"
- Count of Pavia
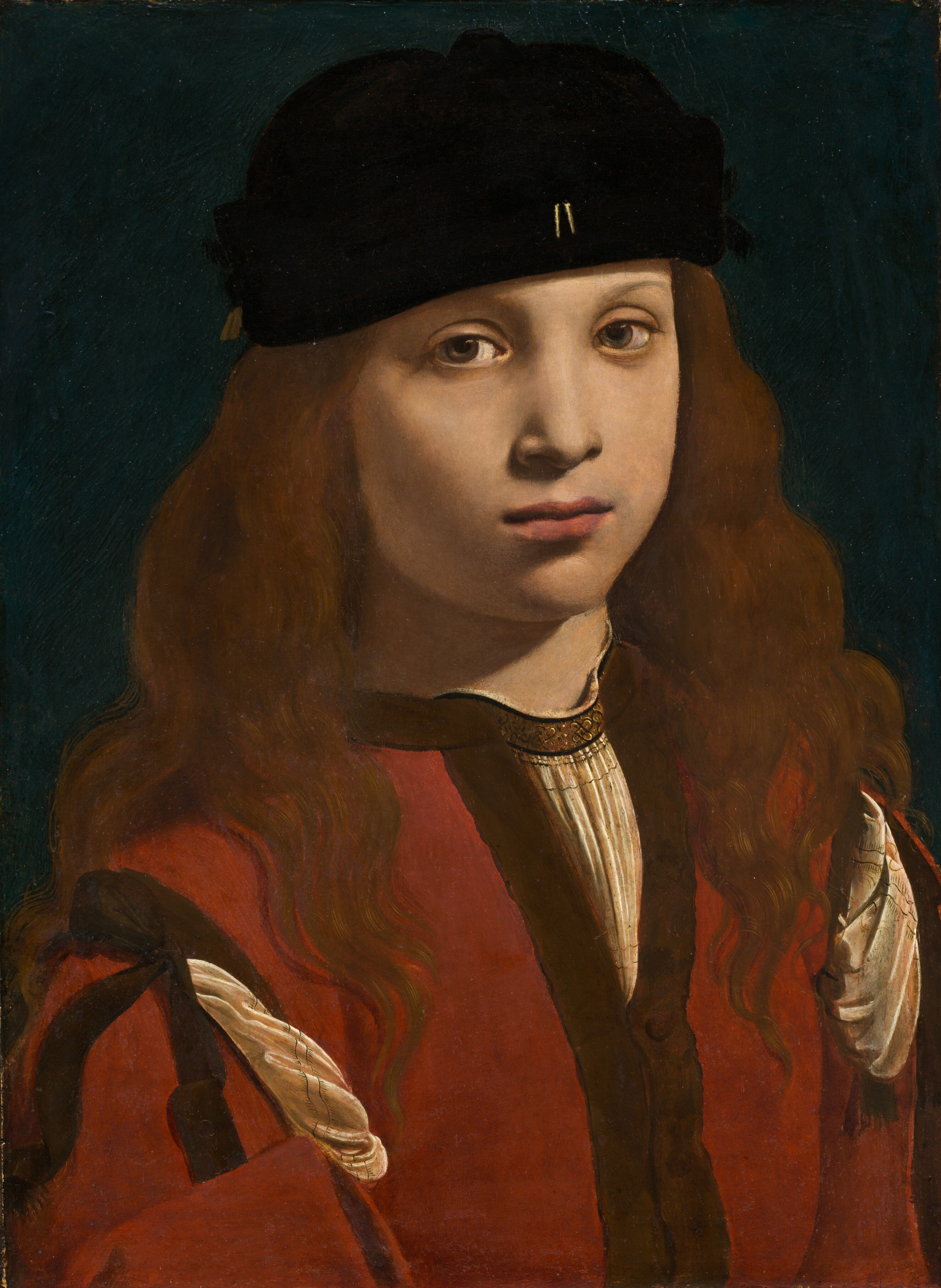
- Portrait by Boltraffio, c. 1495
- Born: 30 January 1491; Pavia
- Died: 1512 (aged 20–21); Angoulême
- Noble family: Sforza
- Father: Gian Galeazzo Sforza
- Mother: Isabella of Naples

Francesco Maria Sforza (30 January 1491 – 1512), nicknamed il Duchetto ("The Little Duke") after becoming titular Duke of Milan at the age of 8, was the only son of Gian Galeazzo Sforza, the sixth Duke of Milan, and his wife, Isabella of Naples. After the untimely death in 1494 of Francesco's father at the age of 25, his father's uncle, Ludovico Sforza, took over as Duke of Milan.

Francesco was Count of Pavia from 1491 to 1499. In the latter year, as French troops conquered Milan during the Italian War of 1499–1504, he was carried to France by King Louis XII and was named abbot of Picardy, whose tutor was Gregorio da Spoleto.

Francesco died falling from a horse at Angoulême in 1512.

== See also ==
- Italian Wars
