= Cicéri =

Cicéri is a surname. Notable people with the surname include:

- Alessandro Ciceri (sport shooter) (1932–1990), Italian sport shooter
- Daniele Ciceri (fl. 1957–1960), Italian sport shooter
- Eugène Cicéri (1813–1890), French painter, illustrator, engraver and theatrical designer
- Francesca Ciceri (1904–1988), Italian anti-fascist partisan, communist, and feminist
- Mario Ciceri (1900–1945), Italian Catholic priest
- Maurizia Ciceri (born 1953), Italian footballer
- Pierre-Luc-Charles Cicéri (1782–1868), French set designer
