= Hill castle =

Castle built on a natural feature that stands above the surrounding terrain

A hill castle or mountain castle is a castle built on a natural feature that stands above the surrounding terrain. It is a term derived from the German Höhenburg used in categorising castle sites by their topographical location. Hill castles are thus distinguished from lowland castles (Niederungsburgen).

Hill castles may be further subdivided depending on their situation into the following:

- Hilltop castle (Gipfelburg), that stands on the summit of a hill with steep drops on all sides. A special type is the rock castle or Felsenburg.
- Ridge castle (Kammburg), that is built on the crest of a ridge.
- Hillside castle (Hangburg), that is built on the side of a hill and thus is dominated by rising ground on one side.
- Spur castle (Spornburg), that is built on a hill spur surrounded by steep terrain on three sides and thus only needs to be defended on the one remaining side.

When in the 10th and 11th centuries castles lost their pure fortress character and were increasingly built as residence castles for the kings and the nobility, the hill castle was the preferred choice owing to its better defensive capability. In Germany, almost 66 percent of all medieval castles (Burgen) known today are of the hill castle type.

In the earliest centuries of castle construction only great nobles and kings had the power to build them. From the 12th century, however, the higher imperial ministeriales also built representative hill castles. This pattern was followed in the 13th century by the lesser nobility.

Today hill castles primarily serve as tourist attractions, mainly because they often have good views − albeit in some cases for the cost of an entrance fee. They also often have restaurants or kiosks. In some cases, where they are preserved, the interior of the castle may be visited.

Examples of hill castles are Kriebstein Castle (spur castle), the Marksburg (hilltop castle), Ehrenfels Castle (hillside castle) and Schachenstein Castle (rock castle).

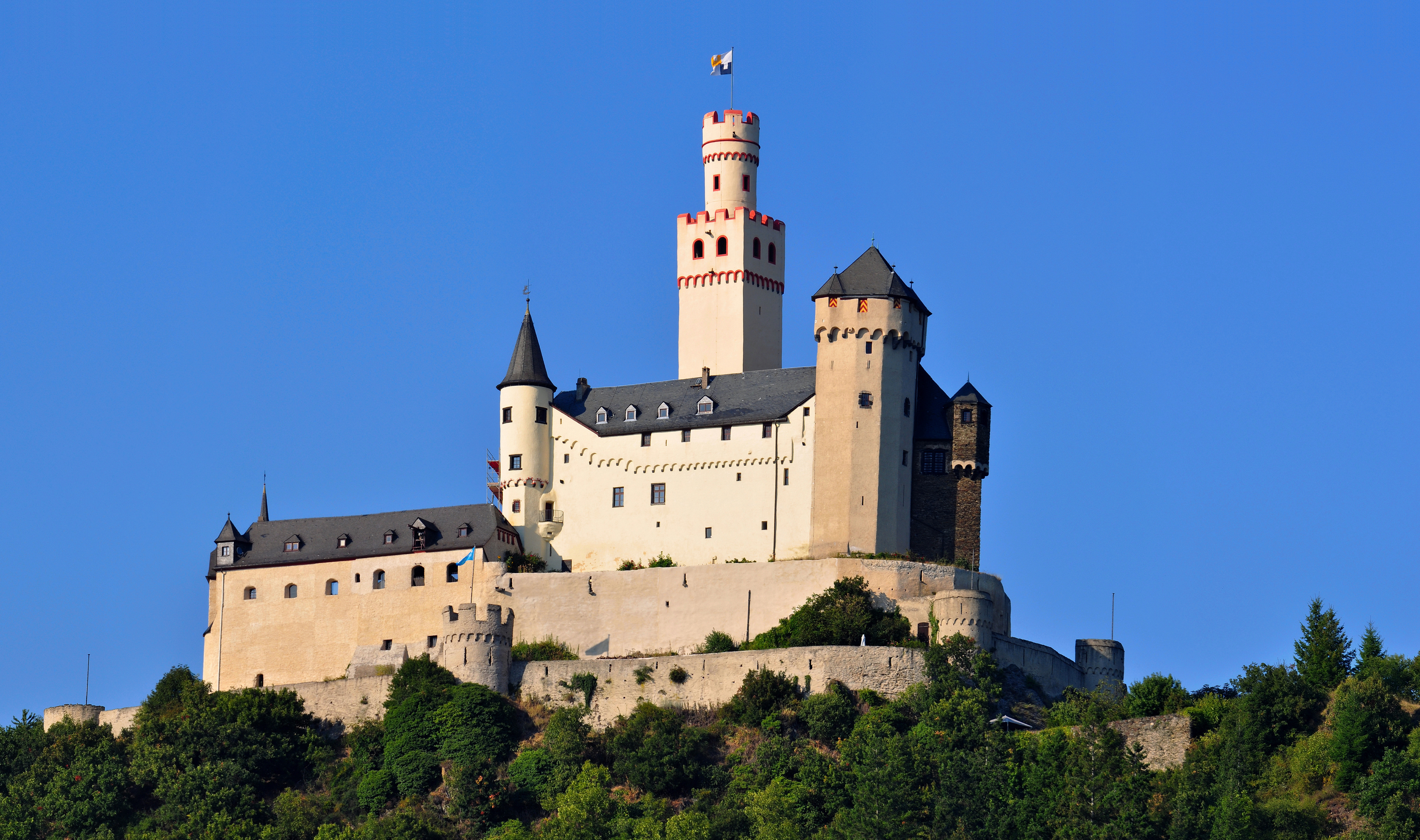
The Marksburg in Germany is a typical example of a hill castle

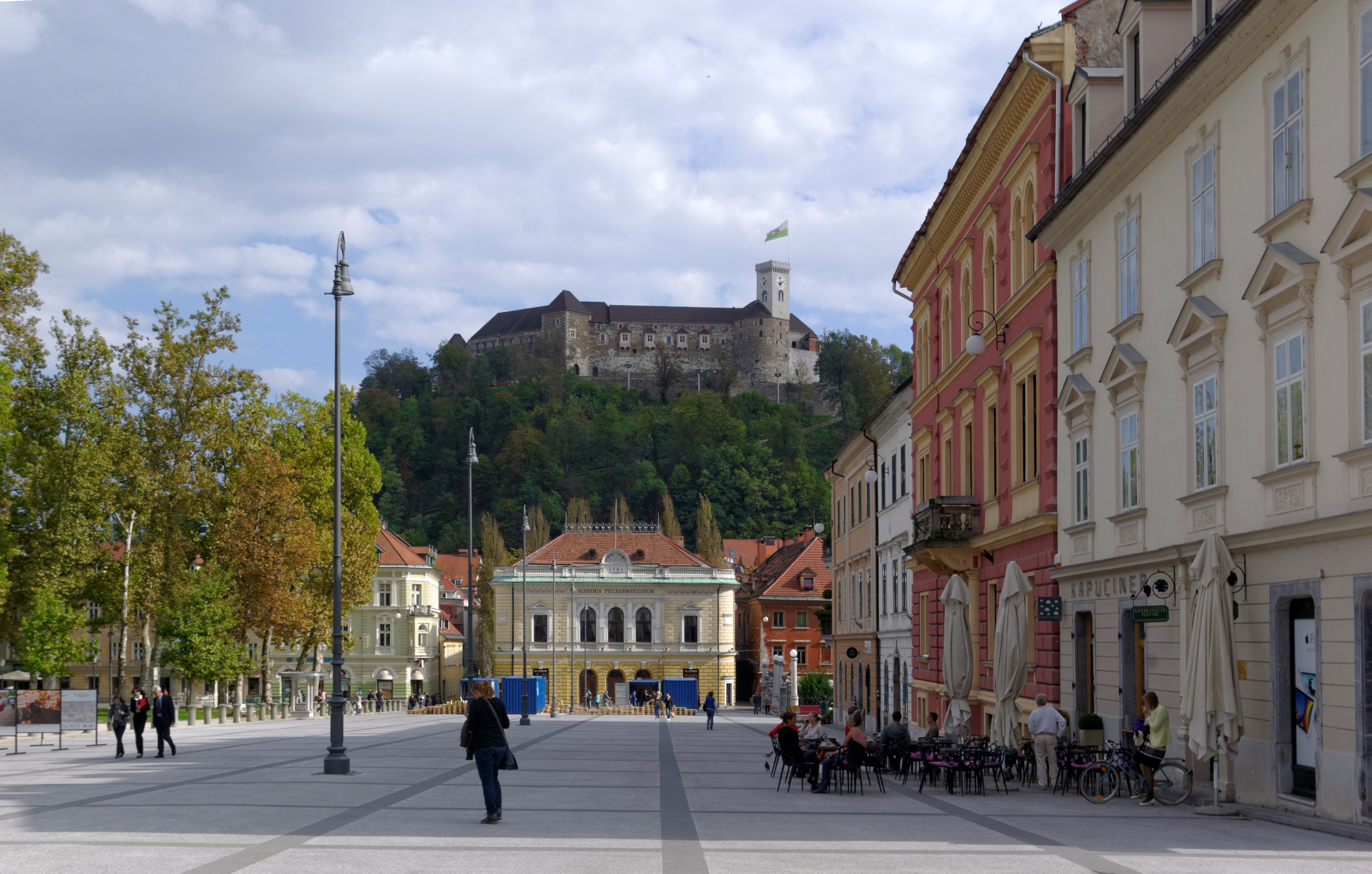
The Ljubljana Castle in Slovenia is a medieval fortress built in the 11th century and rebuilt in the 12th century

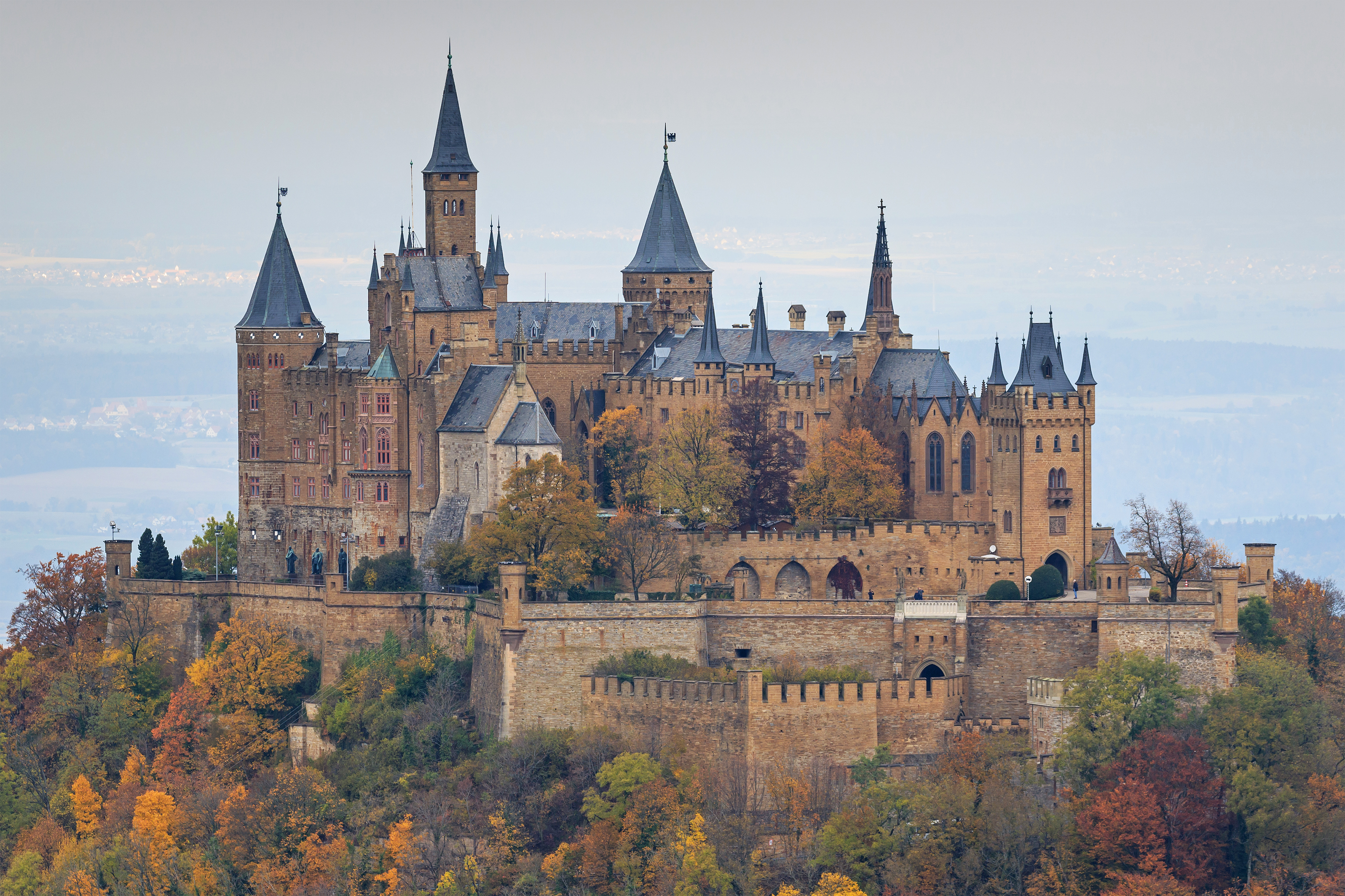
Hohenzollern Castle at a height of 855 m in the Swabian Jura, Germany

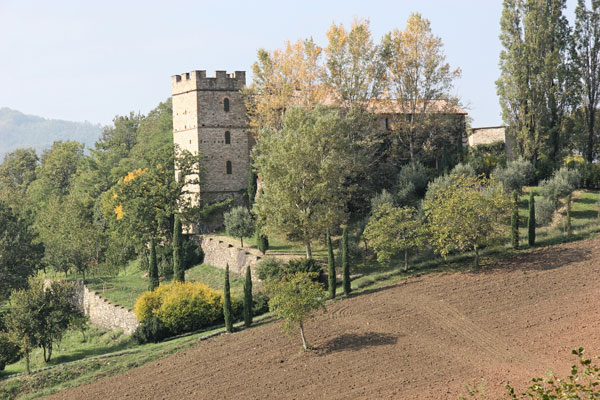
The Montechino castle in Montechino, example of an Italian castle built on a hill

== See also ==
- Lowland castle
- Rocca, an Italian term for fortified houses or small castles built on higher ground above a town as refuge or protection.

== Literature ==
- Horst Wolfgang Böhme, Reinhard Friedrich, Barbara Schock-Werner (ed.): Wörterbuch der Burgen, Schlösser und Festungen. Reclam, Stuttgart 2004, ISBN 3-15-010547-1, p. 156.
- Friedrich-Wilhelm Krahe: Burgen und Wohntürme des deutschen Mittelalters. Vol. 1. Thorbecke, Stuttgart 2002, ISBN 3-7995-0104-5, pp. 21–23.
