= Merlon =

Part of a medieval fortification

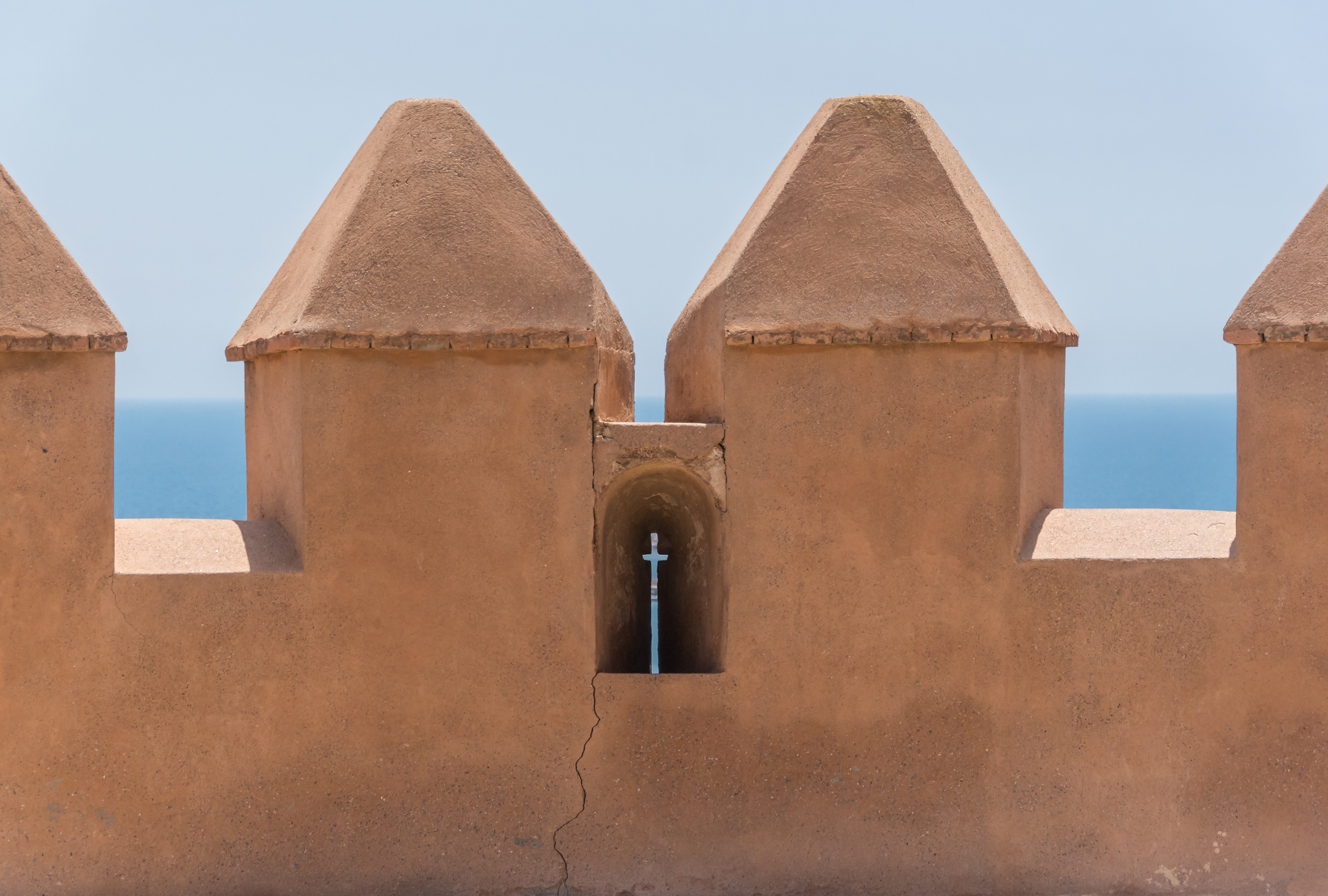
Merlons of Alcazaba of Almería in Almería, Spain

A merlon is the solid, upright section of a battlement (a crenellated parapet) in medieval architecture or fortifications. Merlons are sometimes pierced by narrow, vertical embrasures, or tooth-like slits designed for observation and fire. The space between two merlons is called a crenel, and a succession of merlons and crenels is a crenellation. Crenels designed in later eras for use by cannons were also called embrasures.

== Etymology ==
The term merlon comes from French [1704], adapted from the Italian merlone, possibly a shortened form of mergola, perhaps connected to Latin mergae ("two-pronged pitchfork"), or from a diminutive moerulus, from murus or moerus (a wall). An alternative etymology suggests that the medieval Latin merulus (mentioned from the end of the 10th century) functioned as a diminutive of Latin merle, "blackbird", expressing an image of this bird sitting on a wall.

== As part of battlements ==
Annotated sketch of an Italian battlement

As an essential part of battlements, merlons were used in fortifications for millennia. The best-known examples appear on medieval buildings, where battlements, though defensive, could be attractively formed, thus having a secondary decorative purpose. Some (especially later) buildings have false "decorative battlements". The two most notable European variants in Middle Ages merlons shape were the Ghibelline and the Guelph merlon: the former ended in the upper part with a swallow-tailed form, while the latter term indicates the normal rectangular shape merlons (wimperg).

Other shapes include: three-pointed, quatrefoil, shielded, flower-like, rounded (typical of Islamic and African world), pyramidal, etc., depending either from the type of attacks expected or aesthetic considerations.

In Roman times, the merlons had a width sufficient to shelter a single man. As new weapons appeared in the Middle Ages (including crossbows and the first firearms), the merlons were enlarged and provided with loop-holes of various dimensions and shapes, varying from simply rounded to cruciform. From the 13th century, the merlons could also be used to pivot wooden shutters; these added further protection for the defenders when they were not firing, or were firing downwards near the base of the wall. The shutters, also known as mantlets, could be opened by hand, or by using a pulley.

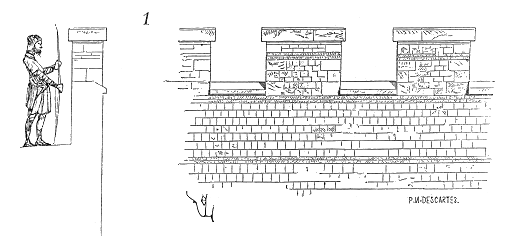
Usage of merlons, from Eugène Viollet-le-Duc's Dictionnaire raisonné de l’architecture française du XIe au XVIe siècle

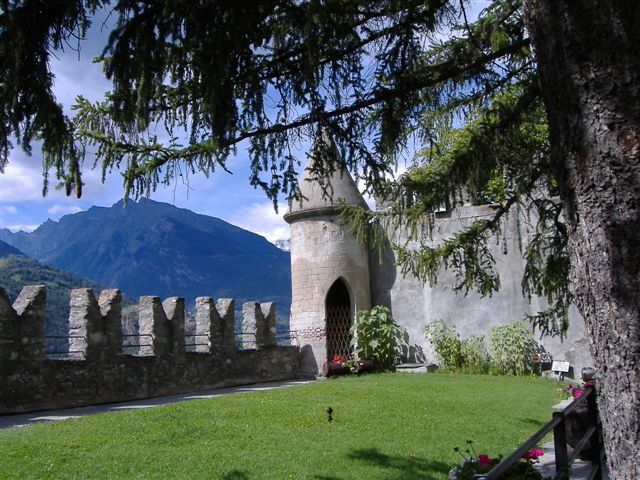
Ghibelline merlons at Saint-Pierre Castle, Italy

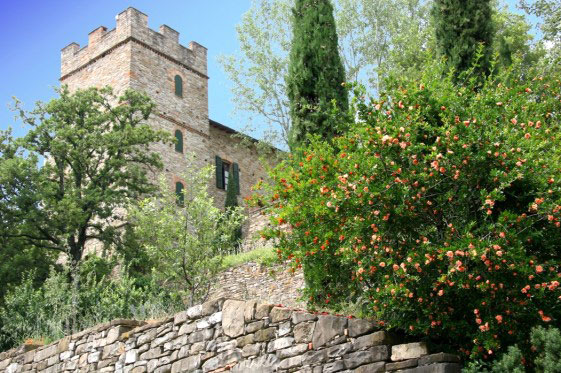
Guelphs merlons in the Castle of Montechino, Italy

== Later use ==
After falling out of favour when the invention of the cannon forced fortifications to take a much lower profile, merlons re-emerged as mostly decorative features in buildings constructed in the Gothic Revival style of the 19th century.

== See also ==
- Defensive walls
- Machicolation
