= Italian resistance movement =

Italian combatant organizations opposed to Nazi-Fascism

Italian resistance
- Resistenza italiana (Italian)
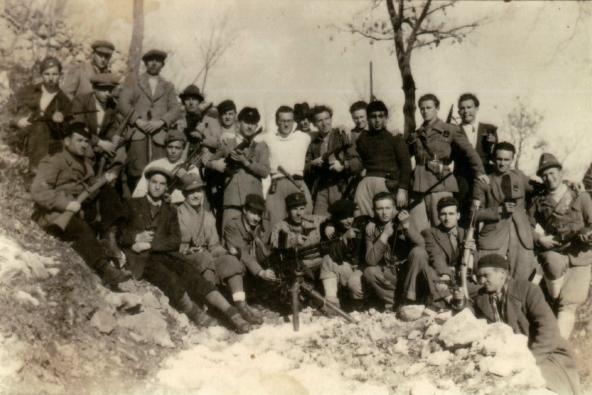
- Clockwise from top: Flag of the National Liberation Committee; A group of Italian partisans
- Leaders: Ivanoe Bonomi; Alcide De Gasperi; Pietro Nenni; Palmiro Togliatti; Ugo La Malfa; Ferruccio Parri; Sandro Pertini
- Dates active: 8 September 1943 – 25 April 1945
- Headquarters: Rome
- Active regions: Kingdom of Italy
- Ideology: Numerous ideologies and factions: Patriotism; Anti-fascism; Anti-Nazism; Communism; Republicanism; Socialism; Anarchism; Liberalism; Liberal socialism; Christian democracy; Catholic anti-Nazism; Catholic anti-fascism; Catholic socialism; Social liberalism; Social democracy; Monarchism
- Political position: Big tent
- Wars: The Italian campaign of World War II; involvement of Italian army and partisan units in Yugoslavia, Greece, Albania, and France

The Italian Resistance (Italian: Resistenza italiana [rezis'tɛntsa itaˈljaːna]), or simply La Resistenza, consisted of all the Italian resistance groups who fought the occupying forces of Nazi Germany and the fascist collaborationists of the Italian Social Republic (RSI) in Italy during the latter part of the Second World War, from 1943 to 1945. As a diverse anti-fascist and anti-Nazist movement and organisation, the Resistenza opposed Nazi Germany and its Fascist puppet state regime, the Italian Social Republic, which the Germans created following the Nazi German invasion and military occupation of Italy by the Wehrmacht and the Waffen-SS from 8 September 1943 until 25 April 1945.

General underground Italian opposition to the Fascist Italian government existed even before World War II, but open and armed resistance followed the German invasion of Italy on 8 September 1943: in Nazi-occupied Italy, the Italian Resistance fighters, known as the partigiani (partisans), fought a guerra di liberazione nazionale ('national liberation war') against the invading German forces; in this context, the anti-fascist partigiani of the Italian Resistance also simultaneously participated in the Italian Civil War, fighting against the Italian Fascists of the collaborationist Italian Social Republic.

The Resistance was a diverse coalition of various Italian political parties, independent resistance fighters and soldiers, and partisan brigades and militias. The modern Italian Republic was declared to be founded on the struggle of the Resistance: the Constituent Assembly, who wrote the Constitution of Italy at the end of the war, was mostly composed of representatives of the parties that had given life to the Italian Resistance's National Liberation Committee. These former Italian Resistance fighters based the constitution on a compromissory synthesis of their Resistance parties' respective principles of democracy and anti-fascism.

== Background ==
Flag of Arditi del Popolo, an axe cutting a fasces. Arditi del Popolo was a militant anti-fascist group founded in 1921 in Italy.

The Italian Resistance has its roots in anti-fascism, which progressively developed in the period from the mid-1920s, when weak forms of opposition to the fascist regime already existed, until the beginning of World War II. Furthermore, in the memory of the partisan fighters, especially those of communist and socialist inspiration, the memory of the Biennio Rosso and of the violent struggles against the fascist squads in the period 1919–1922, considered by some exponents of the left-wing parties (among which Palmiro Togliatti himself) a true "civil war" in defence of the popular classes against the reactionary forces.

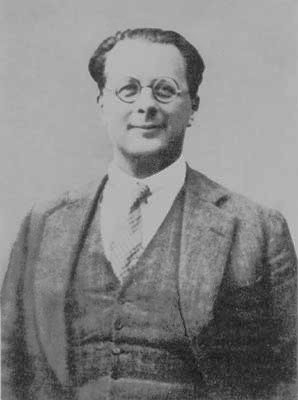
Carlo Rosselli

In Italy, Mussolini's Fascist regime used the term anti-fascist to describe its opponents. Mussolini's secret police was officially known as the Organization for Vigilance and Repression of Anti-Fascism. During the 1920s in the Kingdom of Italy, anti-fascists, many of them from the labor movement, fought against the violent Blackshirts and against the rise of the fascist leader Benito Mussolini. After the Italian Socialist Party (PSI) signed a pacification pact with Mussolini and his Fasces of Combat on 3 August 1921, and trade unions adopted a legalist and pacified strategy, members of the workers' movement who disagreed with this strategy formed Arditi del Popolo.

The Italian General Confederation of Labour (CGL) and the PSI refused to officially recognize the anti-fascist militia and maintained a non-violent, legalist strategy, while the Communist Party of Italy (PCd'I) ordered its members to quit the organization. The PCd'I organized some militant groups, but their actions were relatively minor. The Italian anarchist Severino Di Giovanni, who exiled himself to Argentina following the 1922 March on Rome, organized several bombings against the Italian fascist community. The Italian liberal anti-fascist Benedetto Croce wrote his Manifesto of the Anti-Fascist Intellectuals, which was published in 1925. Other notable Italian liberal anti-fascists around that time were Piero Gobetti and Carlo Rosselli.

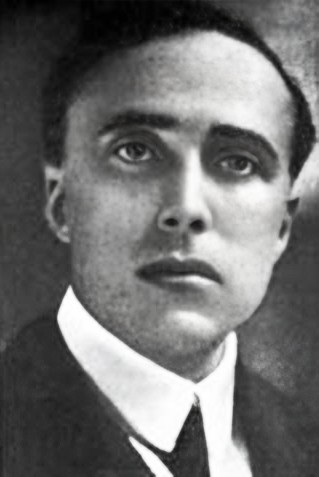
Giacomo Matteotti

Following the murder of the socialist deputy Giacomo Matteotti (1924) and the decisive assumption of responsibility by Mussolini, the process of totalitarianization of the State began in the Kingdom of Italy, which will give rise to ever greater control and severe persecution of opponents, at risk of imprisonment and confinement.

The anti-fascists therefore organized themselves clandestinely in Italy and abroad, creating with great difficulty a rudimentary network of connections, which however did not produce significant practical results, remaining fragmented into small uncoordinated groups, incapable of attacking or threatening the regime, if some attacks carried out in particular by anarchists are excluded. Their activity was limited to the ideological side; the production of writings was copious, particularly among the anti-fascist exile communities, which however did not reach the masses and did not influence public opinion.

Concentrazione Antifascista Italiana (English: Italian Anti-Fascist Concentration), officially known as Concentrazione d'Azione Antifascista (Anti-Fascist Action Concentration), was an Italian coalition of Anti-Fascist groups which existed from 1927 to 1934. Founded in Nérac, France, by expatriate Italians, the CAI was an alliance of non-communist anti-fascist forces (republican, socialist, nationalist) trying to promote and to coordinate expatriate actions to fight fascism in Italy; they published a propaganda paper entitled La Libertà.

Flag of Giustizia e Libertà, an anti-fascist movement active from 1929 to 1945

Giustizia e Libertà (English: Justice and Freedom) was an Italian anti-fascist resistance movement, active from 1929 to 1945. The movement was cofounded by Carlo Rosselli, Ferruccio Parri, who later became Prime Minister of Italy, and Sandro Pertini, who became President of Italy, were among the movement's leaders. The movement's members held various political beliefs but shared a belief in active, effective opposition to fascism, compared to the older Italian anti-fascist parties. Giustizia e Libertà also made the international community aware of the realities of fascism in Italy, thanks to the work of Gaetano Salvemini.

Some historians have also underlined the Resistance's links with the Spanish Civil War, in particular with those who had served in the International Brigades. Many Italian anti-fascists participated in the Spanish Civil War with the hope of setting an example of armed resistance to Franco's dictatorship against Mussolini's regime; hence their motto: "Today in Spain, tomorrow in Italy".

== Resistance by the Italian Armed Forces ==
=== In Italy ===
==== Rome ====
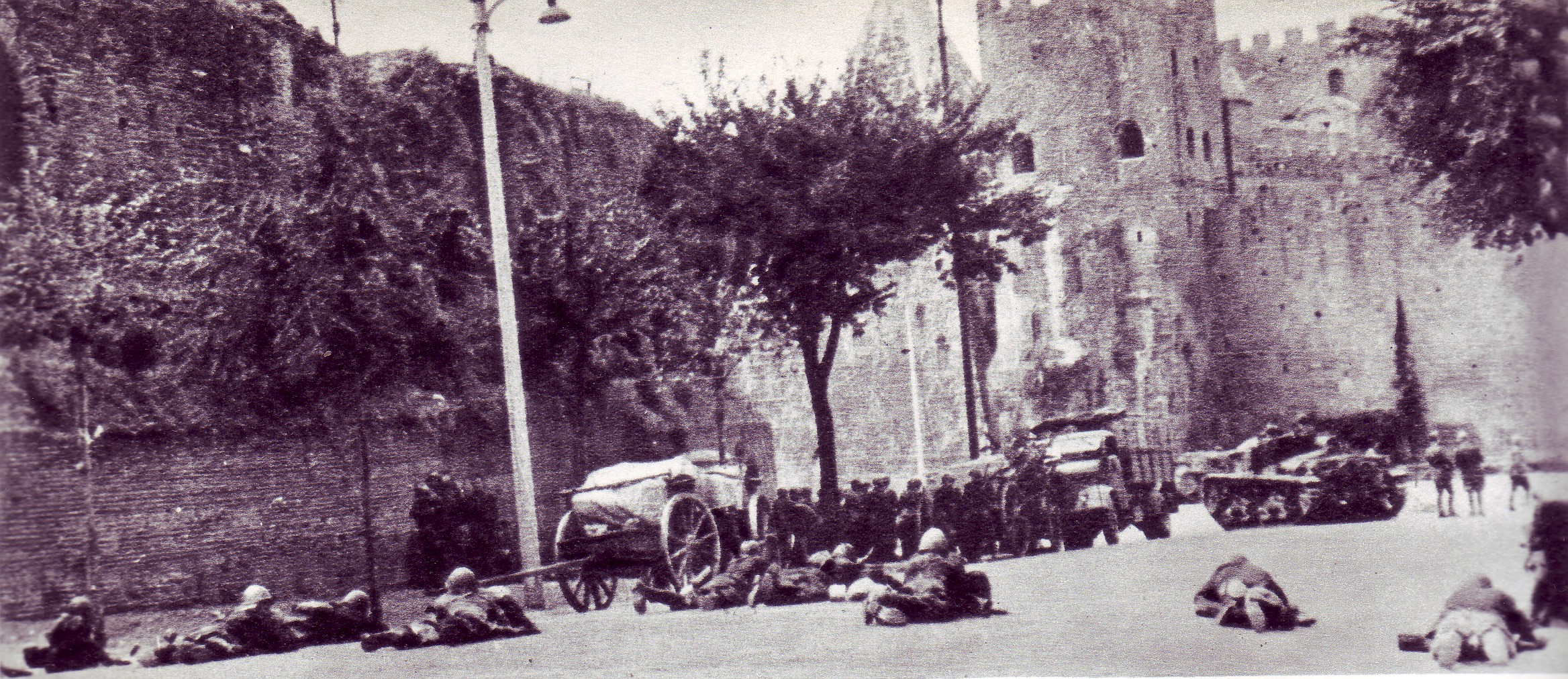
Italian soldiers preparing to clash with the Germans at Porta San Paolo in Rome, 10 September 1943

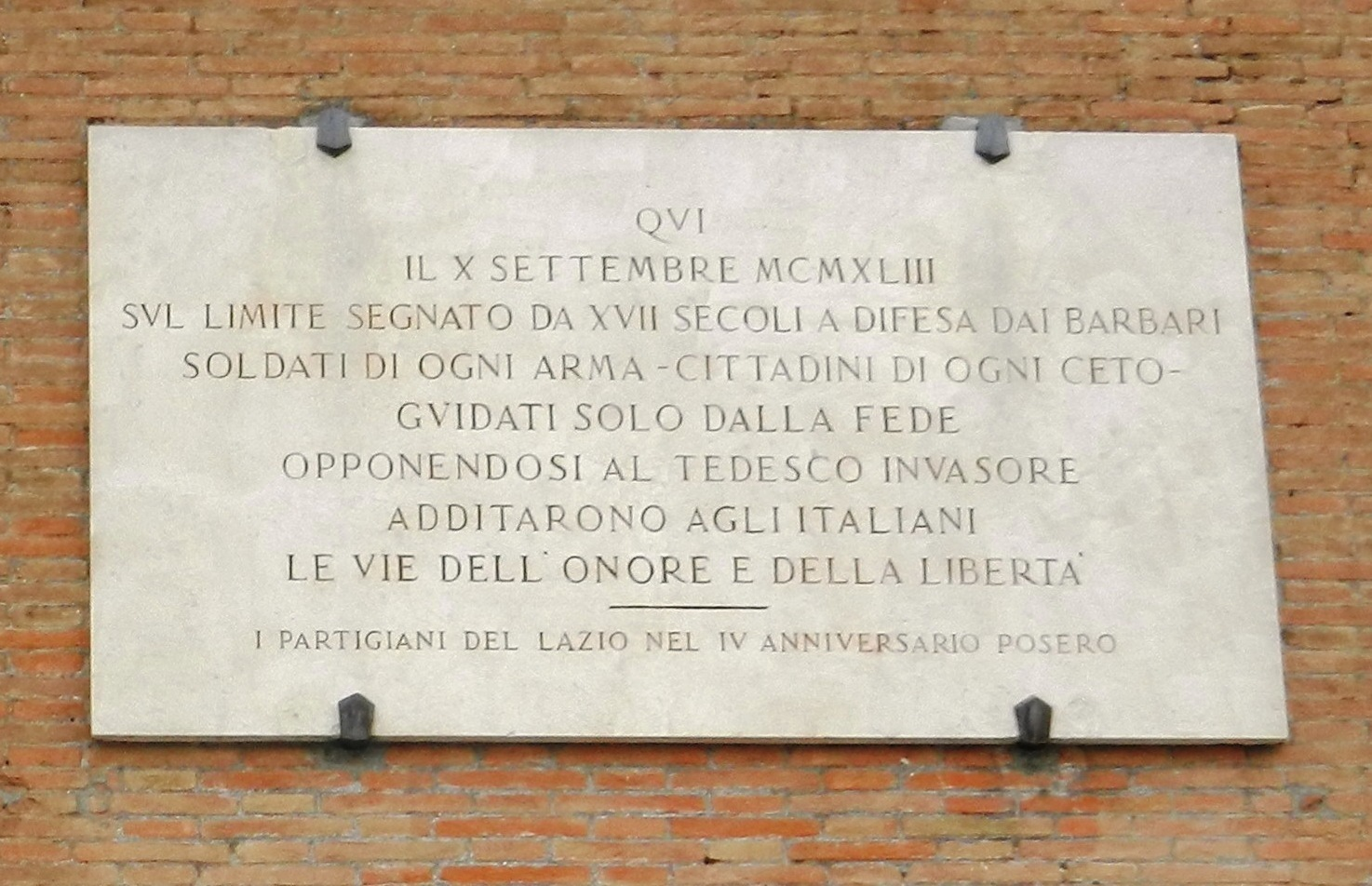
Commemorative plaque for those killed in the battle of Porta San Paolo in Rome (10 September 1943)

Armed resistance to the German occupation following the armistice between Italy and Allied armed forces of 3 September 1943 partially began with Italian regular forces: the Italian Armed Forces and the Carabinieri military police. The period's best-known battle broke out in Rome the day the armistice was announced. Regio Esercito units such as the Sassari Division, the Granatieri di Sardegna, the Piave Division, the Ariete II Division, the Centauro Division, the Piacenza Division and the "Lupi di Toscana" Division (in addition to Carabinieri, infantry and coastal artillery regiments) were deployed around the city and along surrounding roads.

Outnumbered German Fallschirmjäger and Panzergrenadiere were initially repelled and endured losses, but slowly gained the upper hand, aided by their experience and superior Panzer component. The defenders were hampered by a number of facts: Allied support was cancelled at the last minute since the Fallschirmjäger took the U.S. 82nd Airborne Division drop zones (Brigadier General Maxwell D. Taylor had crossed enemy lines and gone to Rome to personally supervise the operation); King Victor Emmanuel III, Marshal Pietro Badoglio and their staff fled to Brindisi, which left the generals in charge of the city without a coordinated defence plan; also the absence of the Italian Centauro II Division, composed primarily of ex-Blackshirts and not trusted, with its German-made tanks, contributed to the defeat of the Italian forces by the Germans.

By 10 September, the Germans had penetrated downtown Rome and the Granatieri (aided by civilians) made their last stand at Porta San Paolo. At 4 pm, General Giorgio Calvi di Bergolo signed the order of surrender; the Italian divisions were disbanded and their troops taken prisoner. Although some officers participating in the battle later joined the resistance, the clash in Rome was not motivated by anti-German sentiment so much as the desire to control the Italian capital and resist the disarmament of Italian soldiers. Generals Raffaele Cadorna Jr. (commander of Ariete II) and Giuseppe Cordero Lanza di Montezemolo (later executed by the Germans) joined the underground; General Gioacchino Solinas (commander of the Granatieri) instead opted for the pro-German Italian Social Republic.

==== Piombino ====
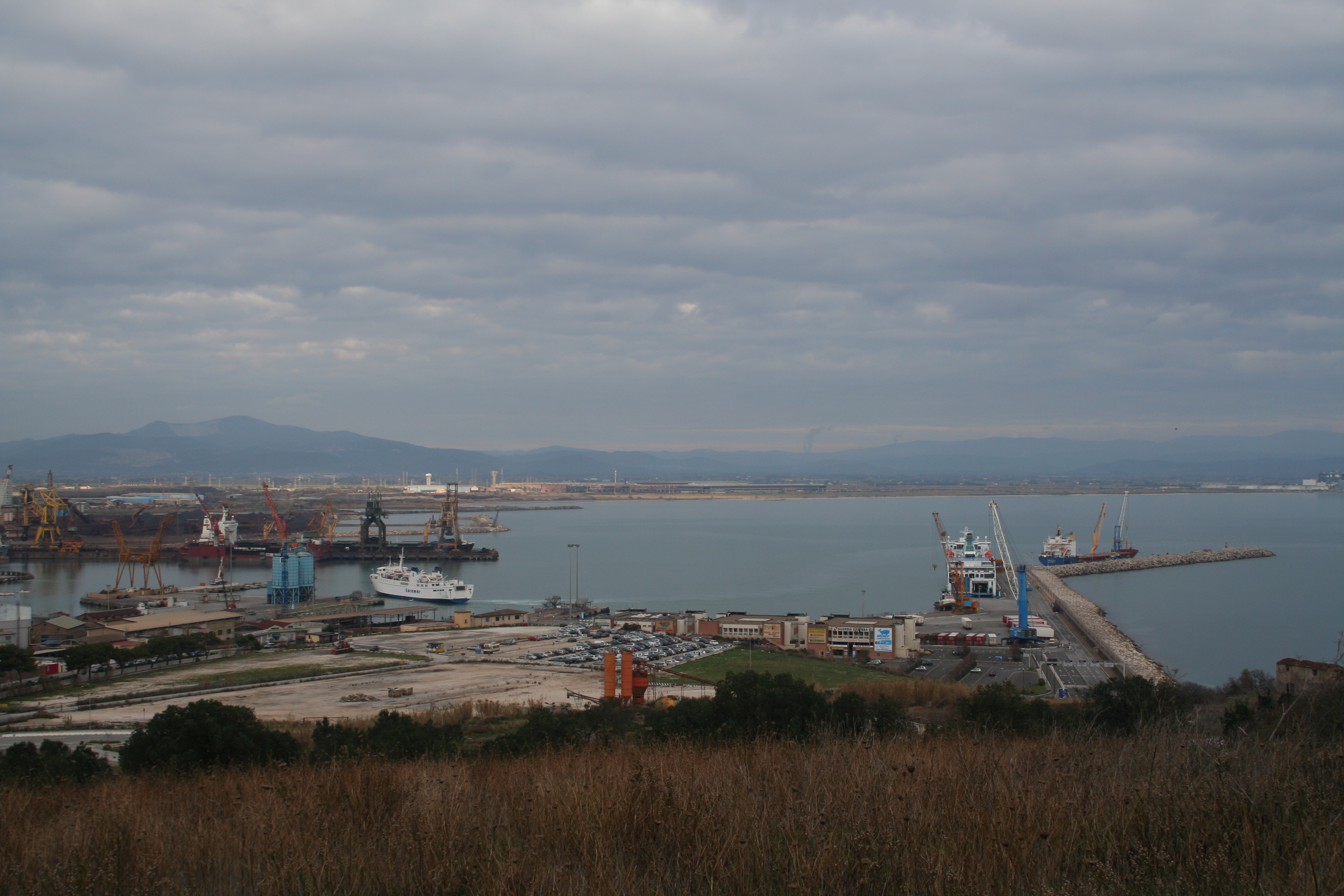
View of the harbour of Piombino in 2012

One of the most important episodes of resistance by Italian Armed Forces after the armistice was the Battle of Piombino in Tuscany. On 10 September 1943, during Operation Achse, a small German flotilla, commanded by Kapitänleutnant Karl-Wolf Albrand, tried to enter the harbour of Piombino but was denied access by the port authorities. General and Fascist official Cesare Maria De Vecchi in command of the Italian 215th Coastal Division ordered the port authorities to allow the German flotilla to enter, against the advice of Commander Amedeo Capuano, the Naval commander of the harbour. Once they entered and landed, the German forces showed a hostile behaviour, and it became clear that their intent was to occupy the town; the local population asked for a resolved reaction by the Italian forces, threatening an insurrection, but the senior Italian commander, general Fortunato Perni, instead ordered his tanks to open fire on the civilians – an order the tankers refused. Meanwhile, De Vecchi forbade any action against the Germans. This however did not stop the protests; some junior officers, acting on their own initiative and against the orders (Perni and De Vecchi even tried to dismiss them for this), assumed command and started distributing weapons to the population, and civilian volunteers joined the Italian sailors and soldiers in the defense.

A battle broke out at 21:15 on 10 September, between the German landing forces (who aimed to occupy the town centre) and the Italian coastal batteries, tanks of the XIX Tank Battalion "M", and civilian population. Italian tanks sank the German torpedo boat TA11; Italian artillery also sank seven Marinefährprahme, the péniches Mainz and Meise (another péniche, Karin, was scuttled at the harbour entrance as a blockship) and six Luftwaffe service boats (Fl.B.429, Fl.B.538, Fl.C.3046, Fl.C.3099, Fl.C.504 e Fl.C.528), and heavily damaged the torpedo boat TA9 and the steamers Carbet and Capitano Sauro (former Italian ships). Sauro and Carbet were scuttled because of the damage they had suffered. The German attack was repelled; by the dawn of 11 September 120 Germans had been killed and about 200–300 captured, 120 of them wounded. Italian casualties had been 4 killed (two sailors, one Guardia di Finanza brigadier, and one civilian) and a dozen wounded; four Italian submarine chasers (VAS 208, 214, 219 and 220) were also sunk during the fighting. Later in the morning, however, De Vecchi ordered the prisoners to be released and had their weapons returned to them. New popular protests broke out, as the Italian units were disbanded and the senior commanders fled from the city; the divisional command surrendered Piombino to the Germans on 12 September, and the city was occupied. Many of the sailors, soldiers and citizens who had fought in the battle of Piombino retreated to the surrounding woods and formed the first partisan formations in the area. For the deeds of its citizens, the town received a gold medal for Military Valour from the President of the Italian Republic Carlo Azeglio Ciampi.

=== Outside Italy ===
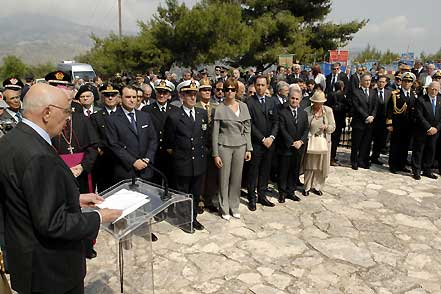
The President of the Italian Republic Giorgio Napolitano during his speech held in Cefalonia on 25 April 2007 in memory of the massacre of the Acqui Division

In the days following 8 September 1943 most servicemen, left without orders from higher echelons (due to Wehrmacht units ceasing Italian radio communications), were disarmed and shipped to POW camps in the Third Reich (often by smaller German outfits). However, some garrisons stationed in occupied Greece, Albania, Yugoslavia and Italy fought the Germans. Admirals Inigo Campioni and Luigi Mascherpa led an attempt to defend Rhodes, Kos, Leros and other Dodecanese islands from their former allies. With reinforcements from SAS, SBS and British Army troops under the command of Generals Francis Gerrard Russell Brittorous and Robert Tilney, the defenders held on for a month. However, the Wehrmacht took the islands through air and sea landings by infantry and Fallschirmjäger supported by the Luftwaffe. Both Campioni and Mascherpa were captured and executed at Verona for high treason.

On 13 September 1943, the Acqui Division stationed in Cefalonia chose to defend themselves from a German invasion during ongoing negotiations. After a ten-day battle, the Germans executed 5,155 officers and enlisted men in retaliation. Those killed in the massacre of the Acqui Division included division commander General Antonio Gandin. On 1 March 2001, the President of the Italian Republic Carlo Azeglio Ciampi visited Cefalonia, giving a speech underlining how "their conscious choice [of the Acqui Division] was the first act of the Resistenza, of an Italy free from fascism".

Other Italian forces remained trapped in Yugoslavia following the armistice and some decided to fight alongside the local resistance. Elements of the Taurinense Division, the Venezia Division, the Aosta Division and the Emilia Division were assembled in the Italian Garibaldi Partisan Division, part of the Yugoslav People's Liberation Army. When the unit finally returned to Italy at the end of the war, half its members had been killed or were listed as missing in action.

On 9 September 1943, Bastia, in Corsica, was the setting of a naval battle between Italian torpedo boats and an attacking German flotilla. It was one of the few successful Italian reactions to Operation Achse, and one of the first acts of resistance by the Italian armed forces against Nazi Germany after the armistice of Cassibile.

=== Italian military internees ===
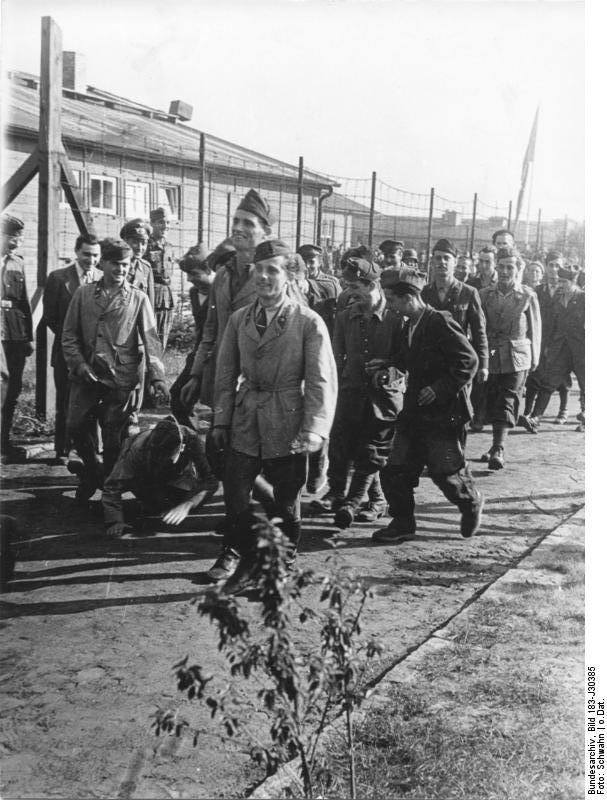
Prison camp for Italian military after the armistice of 8 September 1943, German propaganda photo

Italian soldiers captured by the Germans numbered around 650,000–700,000 (some 45,000 others were killed in combat, executed, or died during transport), of whom between 40,000 and 50,000 later died in the camps. Most refused cooperation with the Third Reich despite hardship, chiefly to maintain their oath of fidelity to the King. Their former allies designated them Italienische Militär-Internierte ("Italian military internees") to deny them prisoner of war status and the rights granted by the Geneva Convention. Their actions were eventually recognized as an act of unarmed resistance on a par with the armed confrontation of other Italian servicemen.

After disarmament by the Germans, the Italian soldiers and officers were confronted with the choice to continue fighting as allies of the German army (either in the armed forces of the Italian Social Republic, the German puppet regime in northern Italy led by Mussolini, or in Italian "volunteer" units in the German armed forces) or, otherwise, be sent to detention camps in Germany. Those soldiers and officials who refused to recognize the "republic" led by Mussolini were taken as civilian prisoners too. Only 10 percent agreed to enroll.

The Nazis considered the Italians as traitors and not as prisoners of war. The former Italian soldiers were sent into forced labour in war industries (35.6%), heavy industry (7.1%), mining (28.5%), construction (5.9%) and agriculture (14.3%). The working conditions were very poor. The Italians were inadequately fed or clothed for the German winter. Many became sick and died. The death rate of the military internees at 6-7% was second only to that of Soviet prisoners of war although much lower.

== Resistance by Italian partisans ==
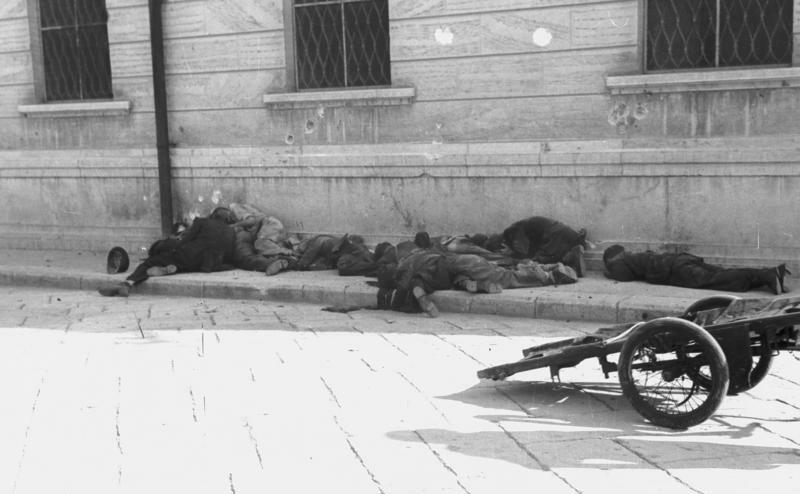
Italians shot by invading Germans in Barletta during the Resistance, 12 September 1943

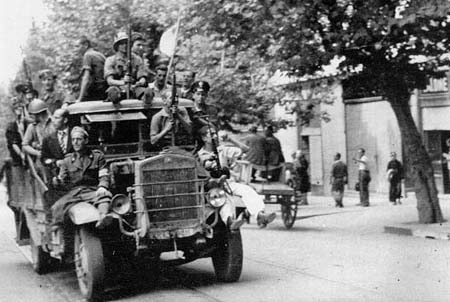
Italian partisans celebrating the liberation of Naples after the Four Days of Naples (27–30 September 1943) during the liberation of the city from German occupation

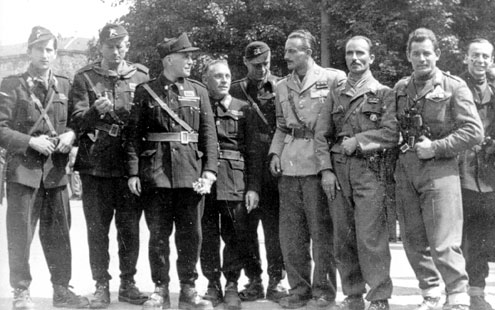
Some members of the Italian resistance in Ossola, 1944

In the first major act of resistance following the German occupation, Italian partisans and local resistance fighters liberated the city of Naples through a chaotic popular rebellion. Naples was the first of the major European cities to rise up against the German occupation, and successfully at that. The people of Naples revolted and held strong against Nazi occupiers in the last days of September 1943. The popular mass uprising and resistance in Naples against the occupying Nazi German forces, known as the Four days of Naples, consisted of four days of continuous open warfare and guerrilla actions by locals against the Nazi Germans. The spontaneous uprising of Neapolitan and Italian Resistance against German occupying forces (despite limited armament, organization, or planning) nevertheless successfully disrupted German plans to deport Neapolitan en masse, destroy the city, and prevent Allied forces from gaining a strategic foothold.

Elsewhere, the nascent movement began as independently operating groups were organized and led by previously outlawed political parties or by former officers of the Royal Italian Army. Many partisan formations were initially founded by soldiers from disbanded units of the Royal Italian Army that had evaded capture in Operation Achse, and were led by junior Army officers who had decided to resist the German occupation; they were subsequently joined and re-organized by Anti-Fascists, and became thus increasingly politicized.

Later the Comitato di Liberazione Nazionale (Committee of National Liberation, or CLN), created by the Italian Communist Party, the Italian Socialist Party, the Partito d'Azione (a republican liberal socialist party), Democrazia Cristiana and other minor parties, largely took control of the movement in accordance with King Victor Emmanuel III's ministers and the Allies. The CLN was set up by partisans behind German lines and had the support of most groups in the region.

The main CLN formations included three politically varied groups: the communist Brigate Garibaldi (Garibaldi Brigades), the Giustizia e Libertà (Justice and Freedom) Brigades related to the Partito d'Azione, and the socialist Brigate Matteotti (Matteotti Brigades). Smaller groups included Christian democrats and, outside the CLN, monarchists such as the Brigate Fiamme Verdi (Green Flame Brigades) and Fronte Militare Clandestino (Clandestine Military Front) headed by Colonel Montezemolo. Another sizeable partisan group, particularly strong in Piedmont (where the Fourth Army had disintegrated in September 1943), were the "autonomous" (autonomi) partisans, largely composed of former soldiers with no substantial alignment to any anti-Fascist party; an example was the 1° Gruppo Divisioni Alpine led by Enrico Martini.

Relations among the groups varied. For example, in 1945, the Garibaldi partisans under Yugoslav Partisan command attacked and killed several partisans of the Catholic and azionista Osoppo groups in the province of Udine. Tensions between the Catholics and the Communists in the movement led to the foundation of the Fiamme Verdi as a separate formation.

A further challenge to the 'national unity' embodied in the CLN came from anarchists as well as dissident-communist Resistance formations, such as Turin's Stella Rossa movement and the Movimento Comunista d'Italia (Rome's largest single anti-fascist force under Occupation), which sought a revolutionary outcome to the conflict and were thus unwilling to collaborate with 'bourgeois parties'.

=== Partisan movement ===
Partisan activity
- Part of Italian campaign in World War II
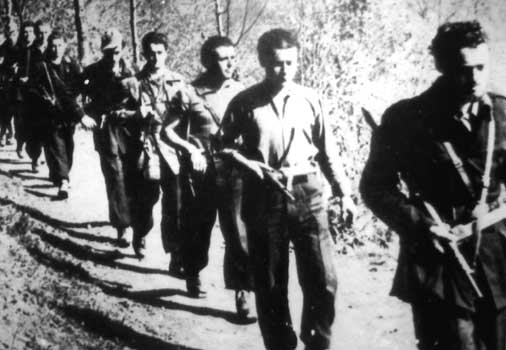
- Partisan formation during the resistance, 1944-45
Date	8 September 1943 – 2 May 1945 (1 year, 7 months, 3 weeks and 3 days)
Location	Italy (excl. OZAV and OZAK)

Belligerents
CLN / CLNAI	RSI Nazi Germany

Casualties and losses
CLN / CLNAI: German figures: 12/43-02/45 30.209 killed, 22.028 captured (unknown executed) and 34.860 civilians arrested postwar Italian figures: 28.368 killed, 20.726 wounded and 14.150 civilians killed	RSI: Regular Armed Forces (ENR) 10/43-03/45 1.977 killed, 1.235 wounded and 606 missing Anti-partisan forces (GNR and Brigate Nere) 10/43-01/45 3.159 killed, 4.339 wounded and unknown missing Nazi Germany: 10/43-02/45 2.075 killed, 3.926 wounded and 2.299 abducted or missing

Rodolfo Graziani estimated the partisan strength at around 70,000–80,000 by May 1944. Some 41% in the Garibaldi Brigades and 29% were Actionists of the Giustizia e Libertà Brigades. One of the strongest units, the 8th Garibaldi Brigade, had 8,050 men (450 without arms) and operated in the Romagna area. The CLN mostly operated in the Alpine area, Apennine area and Po Valley of the RSI, and also in the German OZAK (the area northeast of the north end of the Adriatic Sea) and OZAV (Trentino and South Tyrol) zones. Its losses amounted to 16,000 killed, wounded or captured between September 1943 and May 1944. On 15 June 1944, the General Staff of the Esercito Nazionale Repubblicano estimated that the partisan forces amounted to some 82,000 men, of whom about 25,000 operated in Piedmont, 14,200 in Liguria, 16,000 in the Julian March, 17,000 in Tuscany and Emilia-Romagna, 5,600 in Veneto, and 5,000 in Lombardy. Their ranks were gradually increased by the influx of young men escaping the Italian Social Republic's draft, as well as from deserters from the RSI armed forces. By August 1944, the number of partisans had grown to 100,000, and it escalated to more than 250,000 with the final insurrection in April 1945. The Italian resistance suffered 50,000 fighters killed throughout the conflict.

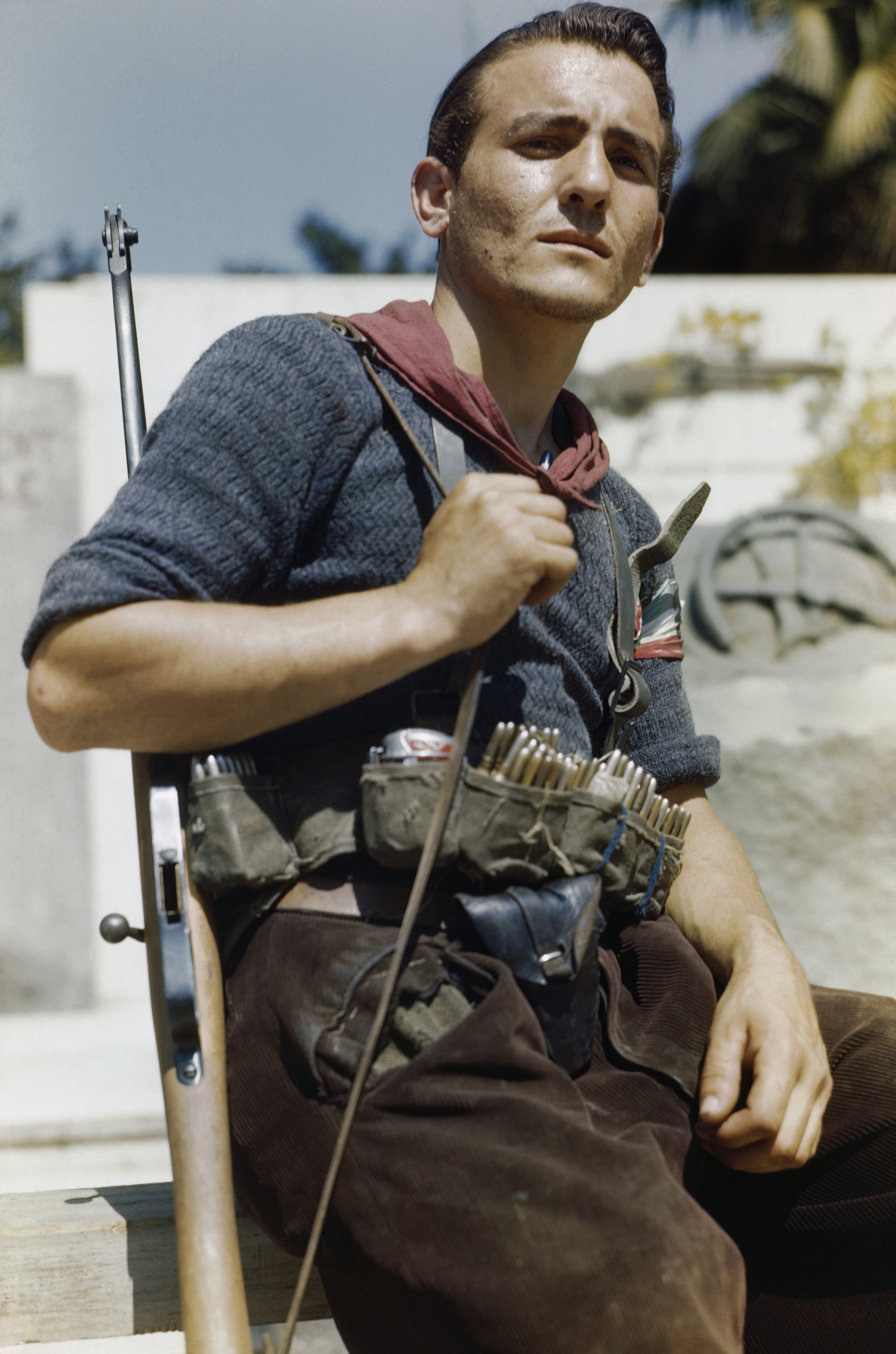
An Italian partisan in Florence on 14 August 1944

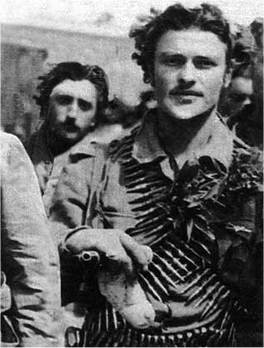
Partisan Alfredo Sforzini

Partisan unit sizes varied, depending on logistics (such as the ability to arm, clothe and feed members) and the amount of local support. The basic unit was the squadra (squad), with three or more squads (usually five) forming a distaccamento (detachment). Three or more detachments made a brigata (brigade), of which two or more made a divisione (division). In some places, several divisions formed a gruppo divisione (divisional group). These divisional groups were responsible for a zona d'operazione (operational group).

While the largest contingents operated in mountainous districts of the Alps and the Apennine Mountains, other large formations fought in the Po River flatland. In the large towns of northern Italy, such as Piacenza, and the surrounding valleys near the Gothic Line. Montechino Castle housed a key partisan headquarters. The Gruppi di Azione Patriottica (GAP; "Patriotic Action Groups") commanded by the Resistance's youngest officer, Giuseppe "Beppe" Ruffino, carried out acts of sabotage and guerrilla warfare, and the Squadre di Azione Patriottica (SAP; "Patriotic Action Squads") arranged strike actions and propaganda campaigns. As in the French Resistance, women were often important members and couriers.

Like their counterparts elsewhere in Europe, Italian partisans seized whatever arms they could find. The first weapons were brought by ex-soldiers fighting German occupiers from the Regio Esercito inventory: Carcano rifles, Beretta M1934 and M1935 pistols, Bodeo M1889 revolvers, SRCM and OTO hand grenades, and Fiat–Revelli Modello 1935, Breda 30 and Breda M37 machine guns. Later, captured K98ks, MG 34s, MG 42s, the iconic potato-masher grenades, Lugers, and Walther P38s were added to partisan kits. Submachine guns (such as the MP 40) were initially scarce, and usually reserved for squad leaders.

Automatic weapons became more common as they were captured in combat and as the Social Republic regime soldiers began defecting, bringing their own guns. Beretta MABs began appearing in larger numbers in October 1943, when they were spirited away en masse from the Beretta factory which was producing them for the Wehrmacht. Additional weapons (chiefly of British origin) were airdropped by the Allies: PIATs, Lee–Enfield rifles, Bren light machine guns and Sten guns. U.S.-made weapons were provided on a smaller scale from the Office of Strategic Services (OSS): Thompson submachine guns (both M1928 and M1), M3 submachine guns, United Defense M42s, and folding-stock M1 carbines. Other supplies included explosives, clothing, boots, food rations, and money (used to buy weapons or to compensate civilians for confiscations).

=== Countryside ===
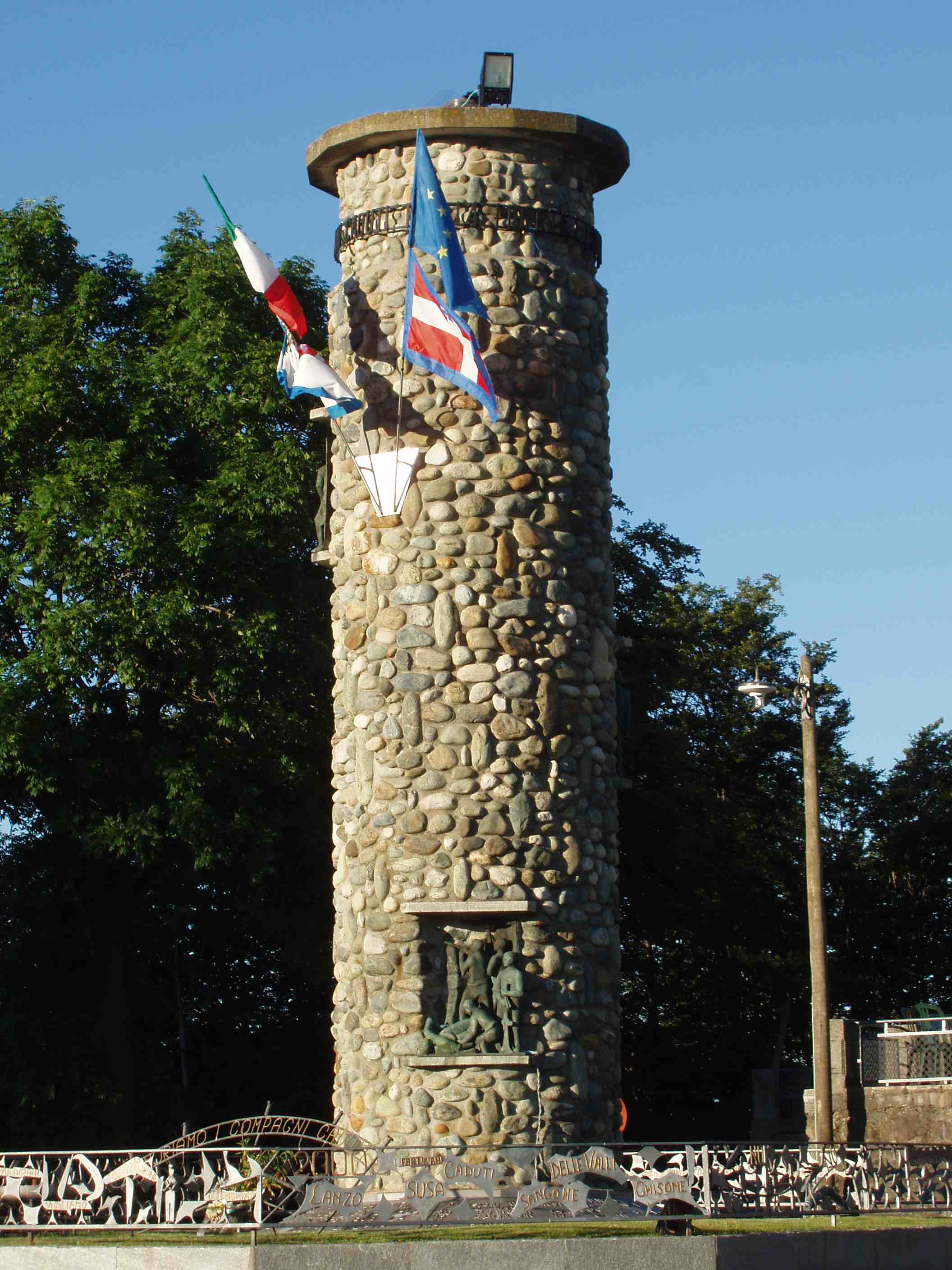
Resistance monument in Rubiana, in the Alps (2008)

The worst conditions and fighting took place in mountainous regions. Resources were scarce and living conditions were terrible. Due to limited supplies, the resistance adopted guerrilla warfare. This involved groups of 40–50 fighters ambushing and harassing the Nazis and their allies. The size of the brigades was reflective of the resources available to the partisans. Resource limits could not support large groups in one area. Mobility was key to their success. Their terrain knowledge enabled narrow escapes in small groups when nearly surrounded by the Germans. The partisans had no permanent headquarters or bases, making them difficult to destroy.

The resistance fighters themselves relied heavily on the local populace for support and supplies. They would often barter or just ask for food, blankets and medicine. When the partisans took supplies from families, they would often hand out promissory notes that the peasants could convert after the war for money. The partisans slept in abandoned farms and farmhouses. One account from Paolino 'Andrea' Ranieri (a political commissar at the time) described fighters using donkeys to move equipment at night while during the day the peasants used them in the fields. The Nazis tried to split the populace from the resistance by adopting a reprisal policy of killing 10 Italians for every German killed by the Partisans. Those executed would come from the village near where an attack took place and sometimes from captive partisan fighters.

The German punishments backfired and instead strengthened the relationship. Because most resistance fighters were peasants, local populations felt a need to provide for their own. One of the larger engagements was the battle for Monte Battaglia (lit. "Battle Mountain"), a mountaintop that was a part of the Gothic Line. On 26 September 1944, a joint force of 250 Partisans and three companies of U.S. soldiers from the 88th Infantry Division attacked the hill occupied by elements of the German 290th Grenadier Regiment. The Germans were caught completely by surprise. The attackers captured the hill and held it for five days against reinforced German units, securing a path for the Allied advance.

=== Urban areas ===
Resistance activities were different in the cities. Some Italians ignored the struggle, while others organized, such as the Patriotic Action Squads and issued propaganda. Groups such as the Patriotic Action Groups carried out military actions. A more expansive support network was devised than in the countryside. Networks of safe houses were established to hide weapons and wounded fighters. Only sympathizers were involved, because compulsion was thought to encourage betrayal. People largely supported the resistance because of economic hardships, especially inflation. Pasta prices tripled and bread prices had quintupled since 1938; hunger unified the underground and general population.

=== Female partisans ===
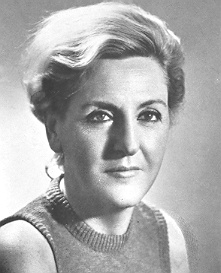
Carla Capponi, a vice-commander in the Gruppi di Azione Patriottica (GAP)

Women played a large role. Following the war, about 35,000 Italian women were recognised as female partigiane combattenti (partisan combatants) and 20,000 as patriote (patriots); they broke into these groups based on their activities. The majority were between 20 and 29. They were generally kept separate from male partisans. Few were attached to brigades and were even rarer in mountain brigades. Female countryside volunteers were generally rejected. Women still served in large numbers and had significant influence.

The groups were formed collaboratively by women from diverse political backgrounds. Prominent participants included communists Giovanna Barcellona, Lina Fibbi, Marisa Diena, and Caterina Picolato; socialists Laura Conti and Lina Merlin; actionists Elena Dreher and Ada Gobetti; as well as women associated with the Giustizia e Libertà (Justice and Freedom) movement. Republican and Catholic women, along with those without prior political or ideological commitments, also joined. These groups predominantly operated in the northern midlands of Italy. Scholars attribute this geographic spread to the influence of local women's clothing, which fostered individual initiative and civic awareness.

Initially, the women's groups aimed to support resistance efforts in auxiliary roles. However, they quickly assumed leadership responsibilities in areas such as information dissemination, propaganda, issuing orders, and handling ammunition. Some women even directly engaged in armed resistance as "gappistas". Ada Gobetti was among the first to criticize the use of the term "assistance" in the group's name. In 1944, the organization's objectives were reformulated to prioritize activities that broadly promoted women's emancipation.

=== 1944 uprising ===
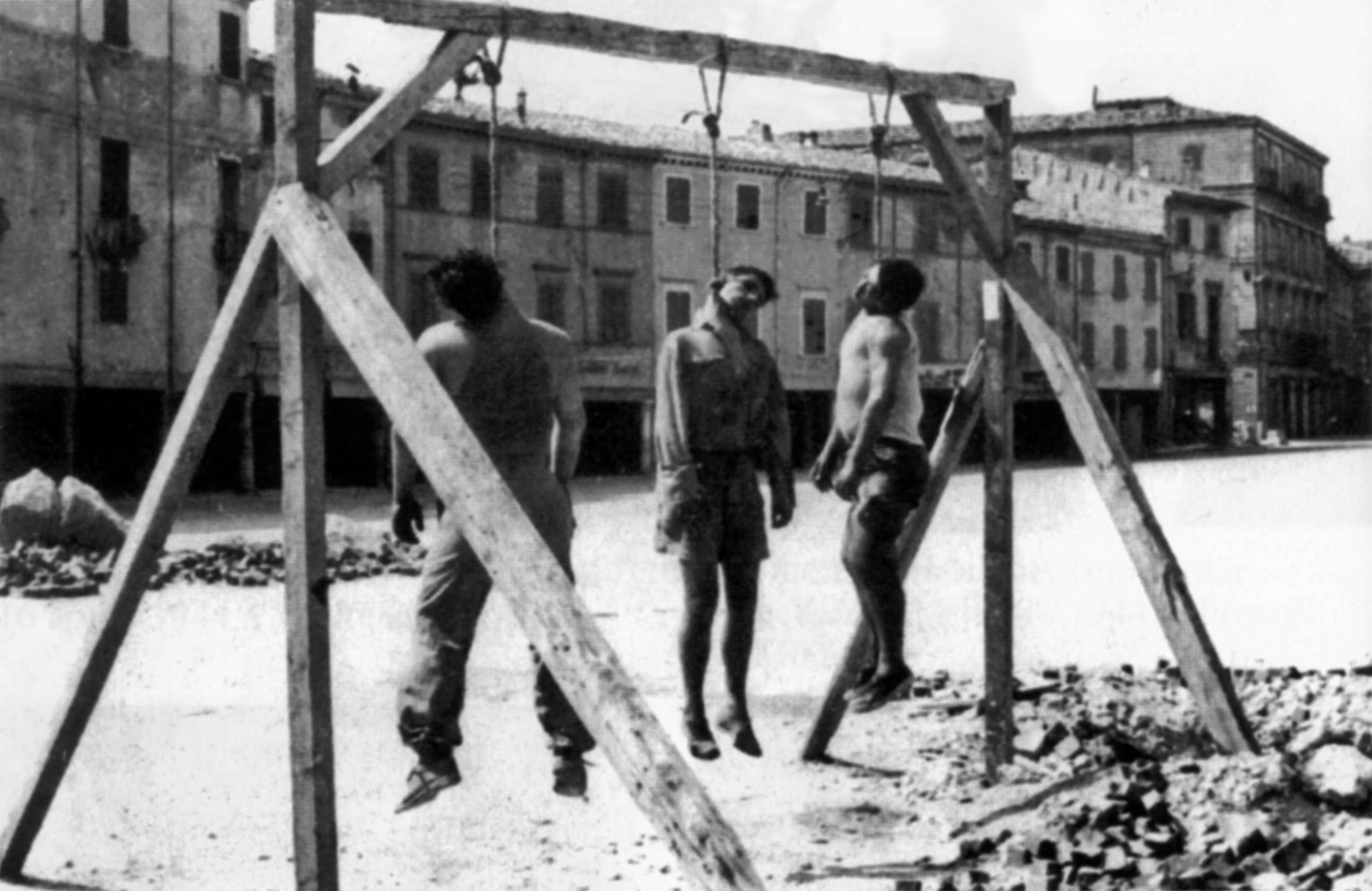
Three Italian partisans executed by public hanging in Rimini, August 1944

During the summer and early fall of 1944, with Allied forces nearby, partisans attacked behind German lines, led by CLNAI. This rebellion led to provisional partisan governments throughout the mountainous regions. Ossola was the most important of these, receiving recognition from Switzerland and Allied consulates there. An intelligence officer told Field Marshal Albert Kesselring, Germany's commander of occupation forces in Italy, that he estimated German casualties fighting partisans in the summer of 1944 amounted to 30,000 to 35,000, including 5,000 confirmed killed. Kesselring considered the number to be exaggerated, and offered his own figure of 20,000: 5,000 killed, between 7,000 and 8,000 missing / "kidnapped" (including deserters), and a similar number seriously wounded. Both sources agreed that partisan losses were less. By the end of the year, German reinforcements and Mussolini's remaining forces crushed the uprising.

In their attempts to suppress the resistance, German and Italian Fascist forces (especially the SS, Gestapo, and paramilitary militias such as Xª MAS and Black Brigades) committed war crimes, including summary executions and systematic reprisals against the civilian population. Resistance captives and suspects were often tortured and raped. Some of the most notorious mass atrocities included the Ardeatine massacre (335 Jewish civilians and political prisoners executed without a trial in a reprisal operation after a resistance bomb attack in Rome), the Sant'Anna di Stazzema massacre (about 560 random villagers brutally killed in an anti-partisan operation in the central mountains), the Marzabotto massacre (about 770 civilians killed in similar circumstances), the Ossola massacre (24 partisans murdered during their retreat from Croveo to Switzerland) and the Salussola massacre (20 partisans murdered after being tortured, as a reprisal). In all, an estimated 15,000 Italian civilians were deliberately killed, including many women and children.

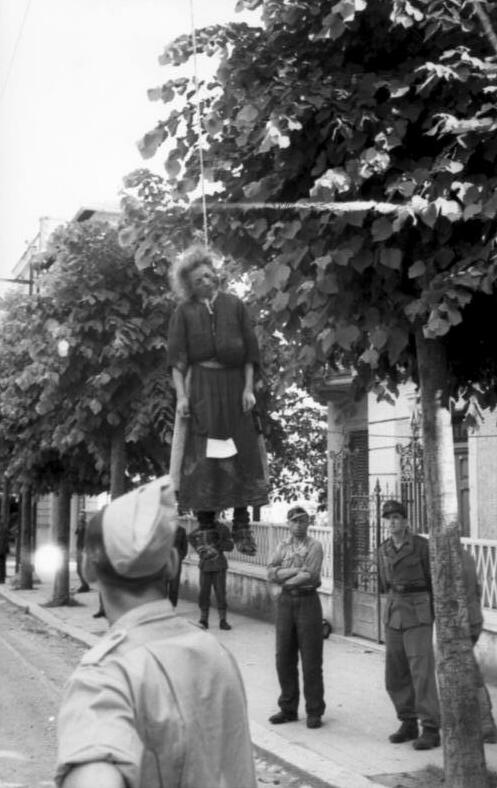
A woman executed by public hanging in a street of Rome, early 1944

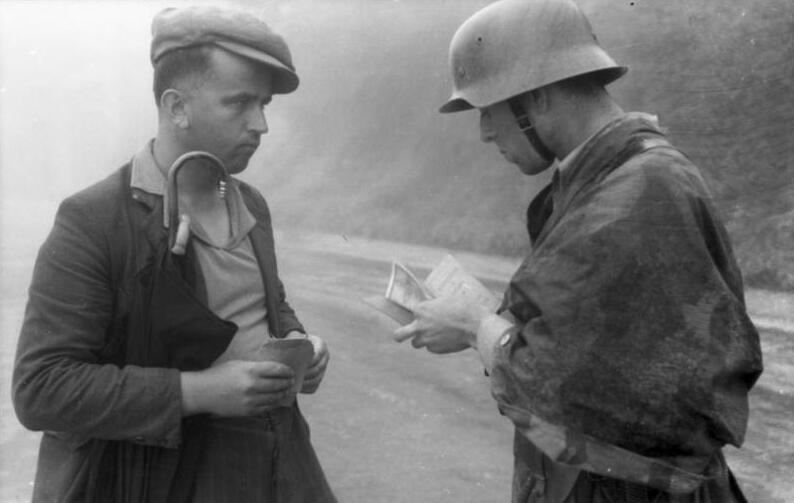
German soldier examining the papers of an Italian civilian outside of Milan (1944)

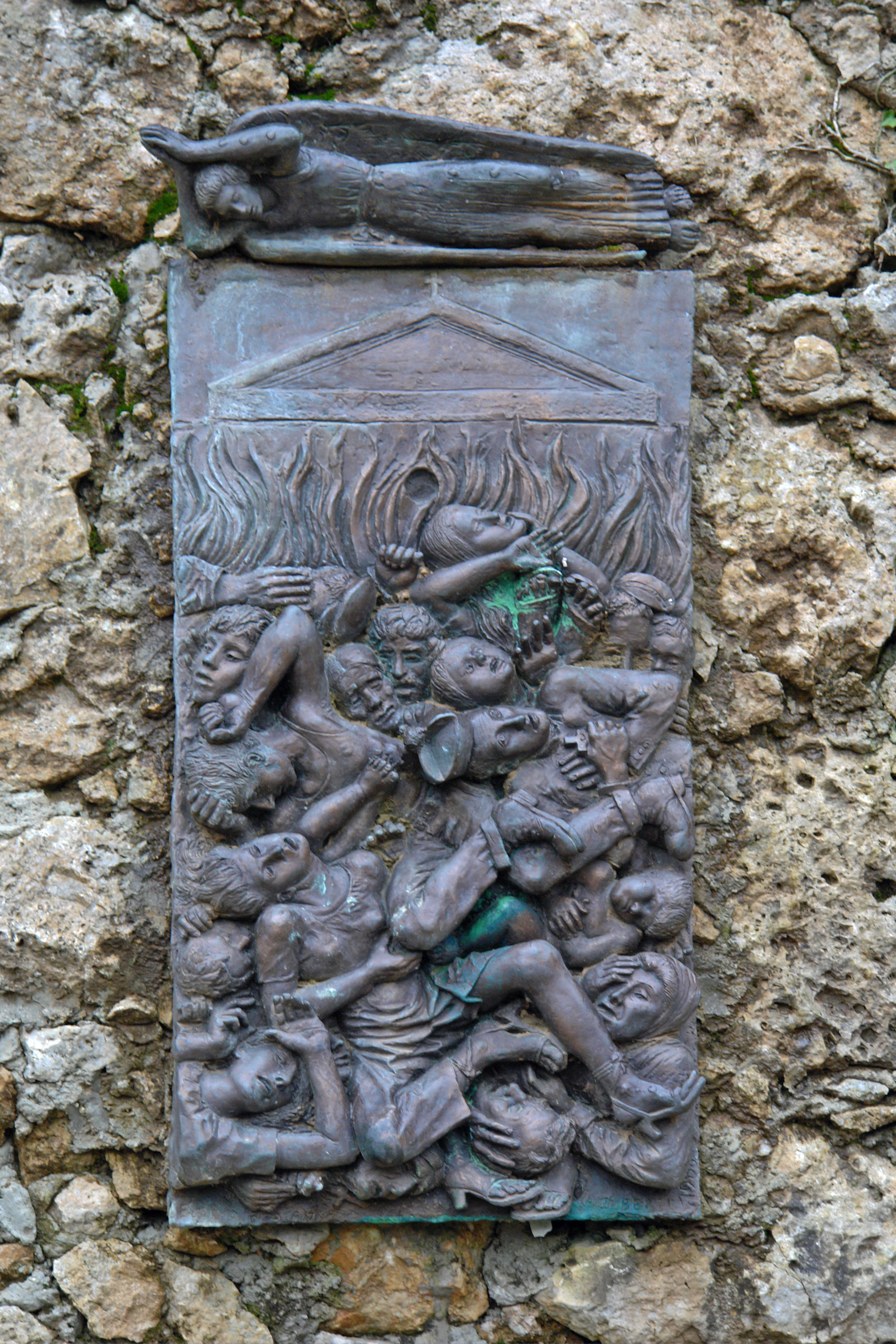
The Sant'Anna di Stazzema massacre memorial relief

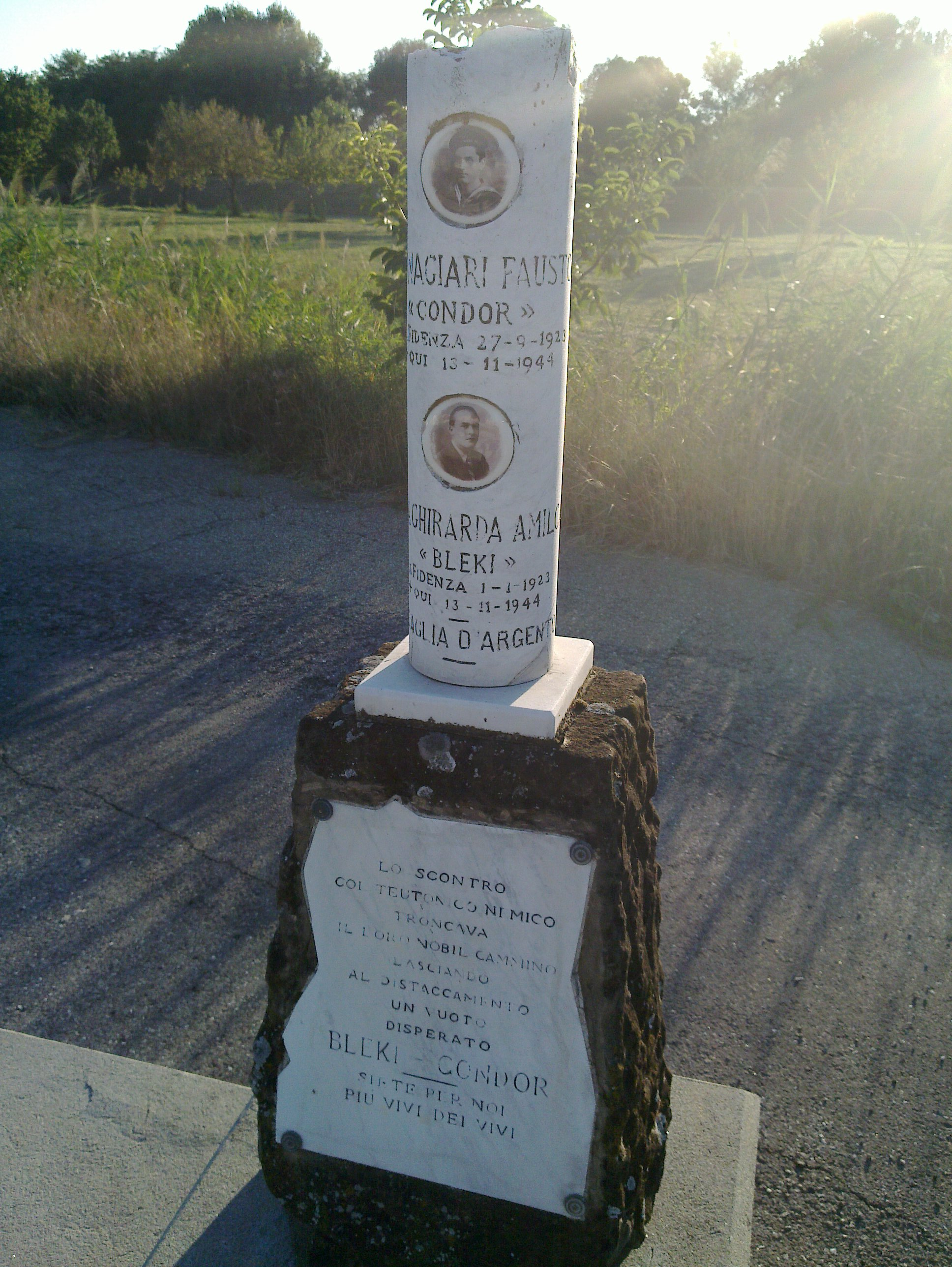
Memorial stone in Soragna for two Italian partisans – killed in 1944

=== Civil war ===
Although other European countries such as Norway, the Netherlands, and France also had partisan movements and collaborationist governments with Nazi Germany, armed confrontation between compatriots was more intense in Italy, making the Italian case unique. In 1965, the definition of "civil war" was used for the first time by fascist politician and historian Giorgio Pisanò in his books, while Claudio Pavone's book Una guerra civile. Saggio storico sulla moralità della Resistenza (A Civil War. Historical Essay On the Morality Of the Resistance), published in 1991, led to the term "Italian Civil War" being used more frequently by Italian and international historiography.

=== Foreign contribution ===
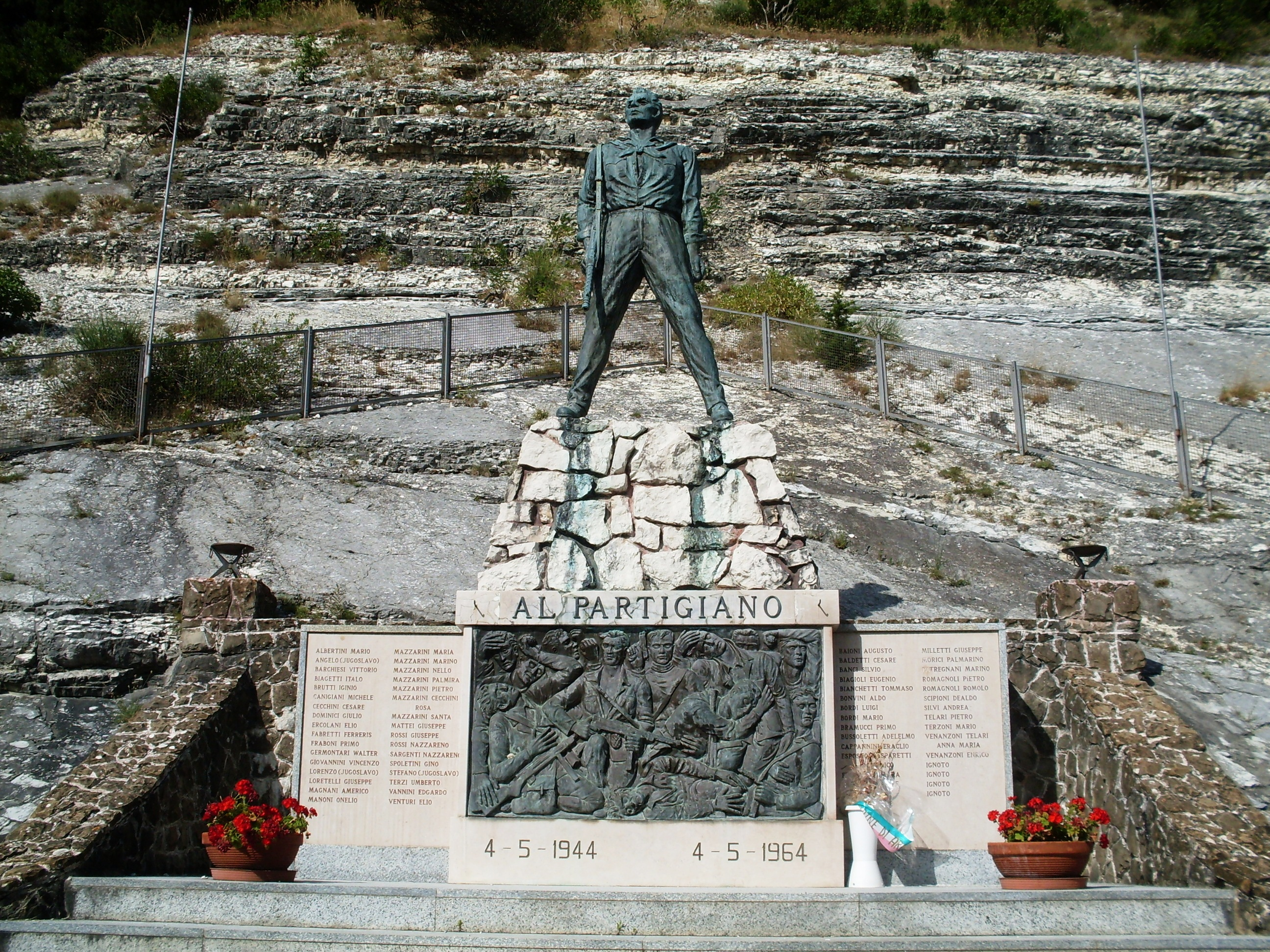
Partisan monument (Arcevia) with Italian and Yugoslav names

Not all resistance members were Italians; many foreigners had escaped POW camps or joined guerrilla bands as so-called "military missions". Among them were Yugoslavs, Czechs (deserters from the Protectorate of Bohemia and Moravia army, in Italy for guard/patrol duty in 1944), Russians, Ukrainians, Dutch, Spaniards, Greeks, Poles, German defectors and deserters disillusioned with Nazism and Britons and Americans (ex-prisoners or advisors deployed by the SAS, SOE and OSS). Some later became well-known, such as climber and explorer Bill Tilman, reporter and historian Peter Tompkins, former RAF pilot Count Manfred Beckett Czernin, and architect Oliver Churchill. George Dunning recorded his experiences of fighting with the partisans in his book "Where bleed the many".

=== Aid networks ===
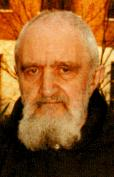
Father Maria Benedetto

Another task carried out by the resistance was assisting escaping POWs (an estimated 80,000 were interned in Italy until 8 September 1943), to reach Allied lines or Switzerland on paths previously used by smugglers. Some fugitives and groups of fugitives hid in safe houses, usually arranged by women (less likely to arouse suspicion). After the war, Field Marshal Harold Alexander issued a certificate to those who thereby risked their lives.

Italian Jews were aided by DELASEM, a network extending throughout occupied Italy that included Jews and Gentiles, Roman Catholic clergy, faithful/sympathetic police officers and even some German soldiers. DELASEM operated in Rome until the liberation under the leadership of the Jewish delegates Septimius Sorani, Giuseppe Levi, and the Capuchin Father Maria Benedetto. Since Jews were considered "enemy aliens" by the Social Republic regime, they were left with little or nothing to live on, and many were deported to Nazi concentration and extermination camps where about 7,000 died. DELASEM helped thousands of Jews by offering food, shelter and money. Some of its members would later be designated Righteous Among the Nations.

== Liberation ==
=== 1945 uprising ===
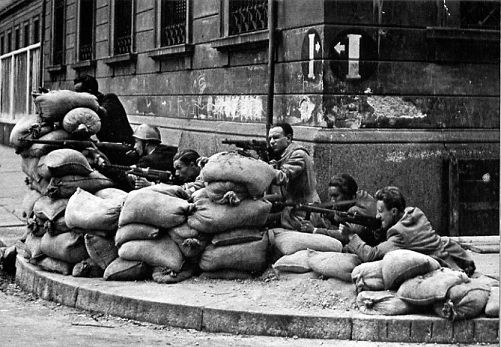
Italian partisans in Milan during the liberation of the city, April 1945

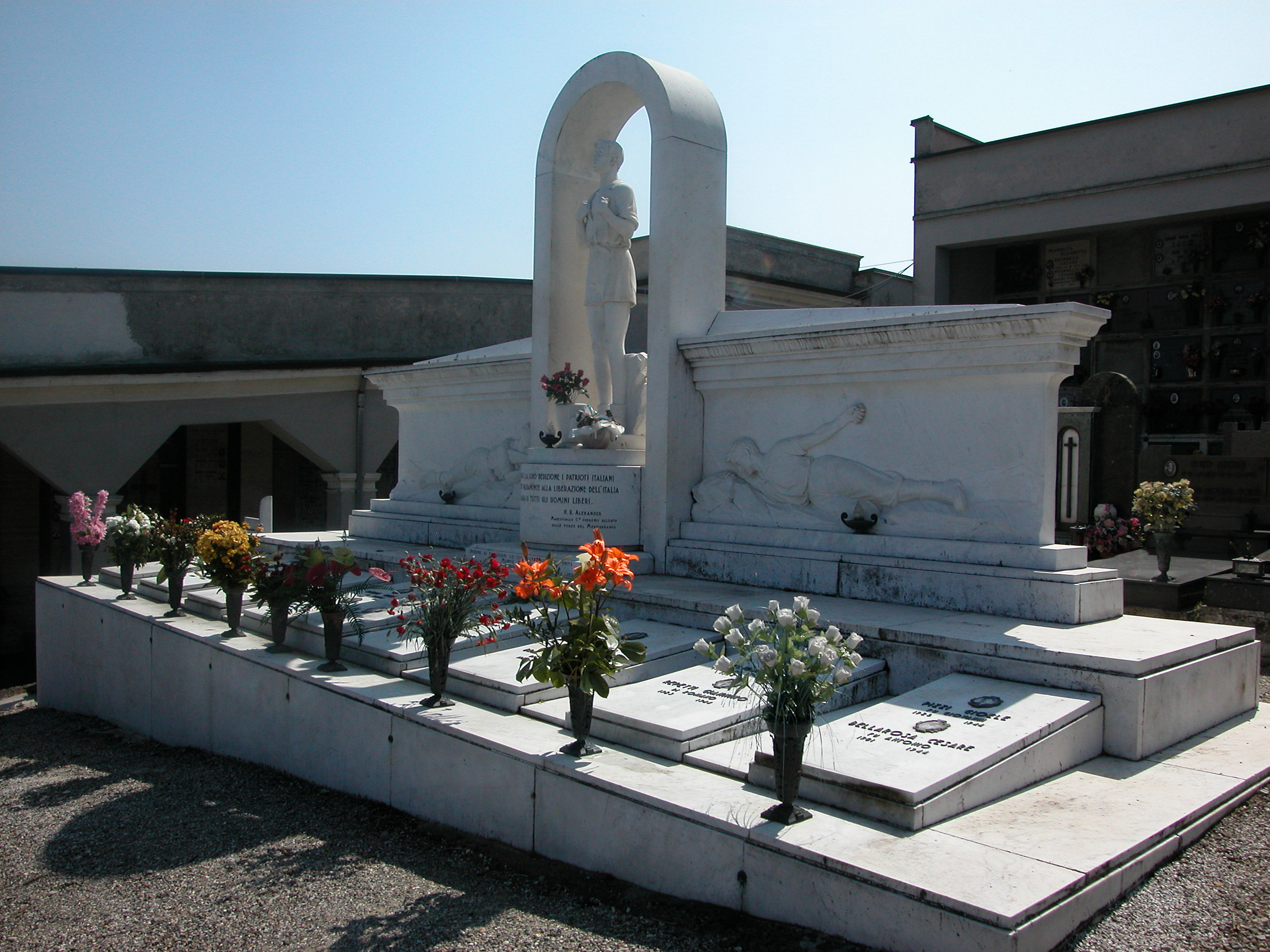
Monument to the fallen at the burial place of partisans killed on 26 April 1945, at Montù Beccaria (2007)

On 19 April 1945, the CLN called for an insurrection (the 25 April uprising). In Bologna, the occupying Nazi German forces and their few remaining Italian Fascist allies were openly attacked by Italian partisans on 19 April, and by 21 April, the city of Bologna was liberated by the partisans, the Italian Co-Belligerent Army, and the Polish II Corps under Allied command; Parma and Reggio Emilia were later freed on 24 April by the Italian Resistance and then the advancing Allied forces. Turin and Milan were liberated on 25 April through a popular revolt and Italian Resistance insurrection following a general strike that commenced two days earlier; over 14,000 German and Fascist troops were captured in Genoa on 26–27 April, when General Günther Meinhold surrendered to the CLN. The forces of German occupation in Italy officially capitulated on 2 May. Fascists attempted to continue fighting, but were quickly suppressed by the partisans and the Allied forces.

The April insurrection brought to the fore issues between the resistance and the Allies. Given the revolutionary dimension of the insurrection in the industrial centres of Turin, Milan, and Genoa, where concerted factory occupations by armed workers had occurred, the Allied commanders sought to impose control as soon as they took the place of the retreating Germans. While the Kingdom of Italy was the de facto ruler of the south, the National Liberation Committee, still embedded in German territory, existed as a populist organization which posed a threat to the monarchy and property owners in post-war Italy. However the PCI, under directives from Moscow, enabled the Allies to carry out their program of disarming the partisans and discouraged any revolutionary attempt at changing the social system. Instead, the PCI emphasized national unity and "progressive democracy" in order to stake their claim in the post-war political situation. Despite the pressing need to resolve social issues which persisted after the fall of fascism, the resistance movement was subordinated to the interests of Allied leaders in order to maintain the status quo.

=== Revenge killings ===
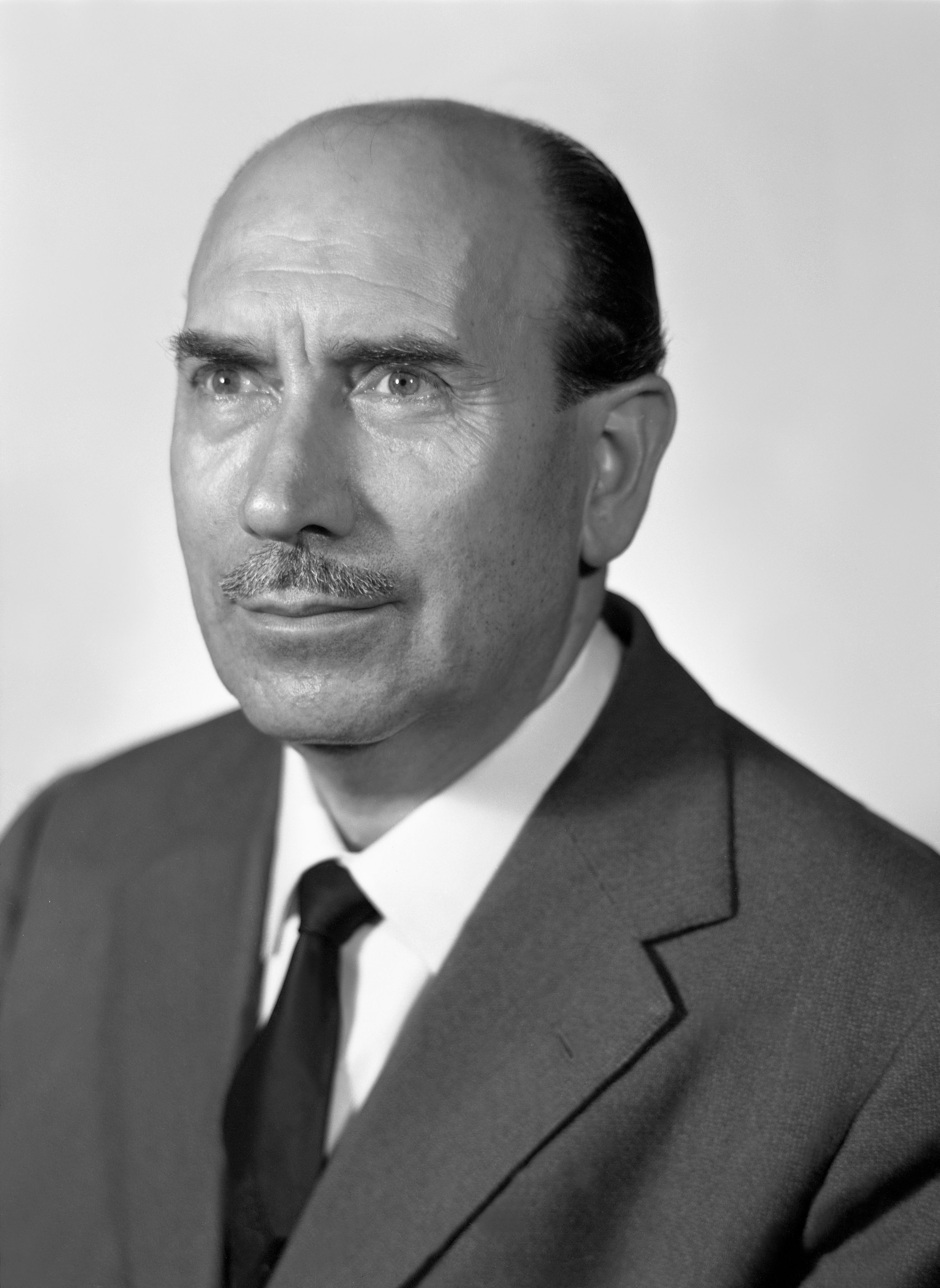
Walter Audisio, the Italian partisan believed to have executed Benito Mussolini

A score-settling campaign (Italian: resa dei conti) ensued against pro-German collaborators, thousands of whom were rounded up by the vengeful partisans. Controversially, many of those detainees were speedily court martialed, condemned and shot, or killed without trial. Minister of Interior Mario Scelba later put the number of the victims of such executions at 732, but other estimates were much higher. Partisan leader Ferruccio Parri, who briefly served as Prime Minister after the war in 1945, said thousands were killed. Some partisans, such as perpetrators of the Schio massacre, were tried by an Allied Military Court.

During the waning hours of the war, Mussolini, accompanied by Marshal Graziani, headed to Milan to meet with Cardinal Alfredo Ildefonso Schuster. Mussolini was hoping to negotiate a deal but was given only the option of unconditional surrender. His negotiations were an act of betrayal against the Germans. When confronted about this by Achille Marazza, Mussolini said, "They [the Nazis] have always treated us as slaves. I will now resume my freedom of action." With the city already held by resistance fighters, Mussolini used his connections one last time to secure passage with an escaping German convoy on its way to the Brenner Pass with his mistress Claretta Petacci.

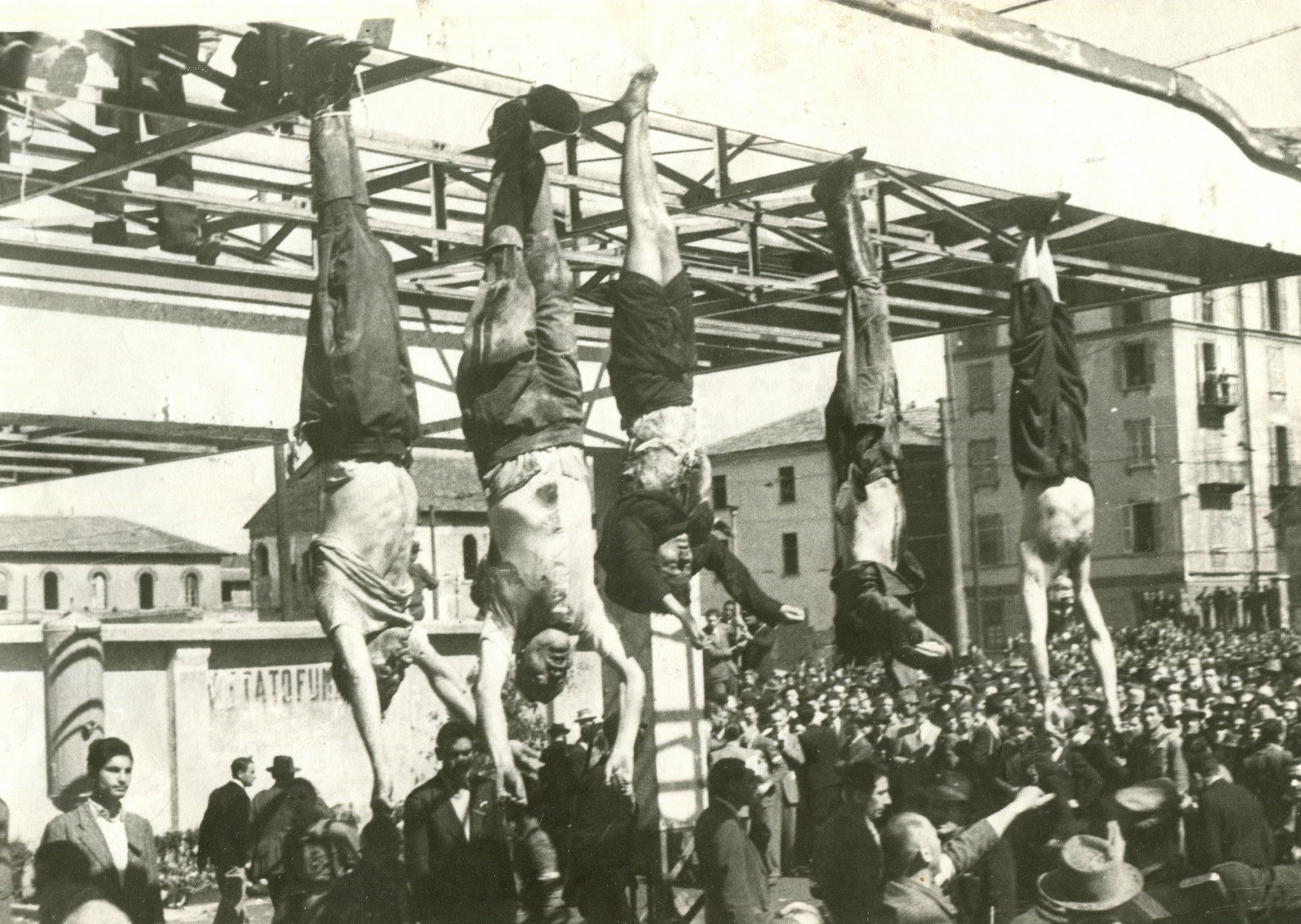
The dead body of Benito Mussolini, Claretta Petacci and other executed fascists by Italian partisans on display at Piazzale Loreto square in Milan, April 1945

On the morning of 27 April 1945, Umberto Lazzaro (nom de guerre 'Partisan Bill'), a partisan with the 52nd Garibaldi Brigade, was checking a column of lorries carrying retreating SS troops at Dongo, Lombardy, near the Swiss border. Lazzaro recognized and arrested Mussolini. The task of executing Mussolini was, according to the official version, given to a 'Colonel Valerio' (identified as Walter Audisio) and the bodies of Mussolini and Petacci were later brought to Milan and hung upside down in the Piazzale Loreto square. Eighteen executed prominent Fascists (including Mussolini, Fernando Mezzasoma, Luigi Gatti, Alessandro Pavolini and Achille Starace) were displayed in the square; this place was significant because the bodies of 15 executed enemies of Mussolini's regime had been displayed in this square the previous year.

The total number of victims of the anti-fascist movement remains unclear; it is estimated that between 12,000 and 26,000 people were killed, usually in extrajudicial executions. The outburst was particularly violent in the northern provinces; according to statistics provided by the Ministry of Interior, some 9,000 people were killed there during April and May 1945 only. Proportionally, the scale of vengeance killings was much greater than in Belgium and significantly above that recorded in France.

Some historians who have dealt with the civil war in Italy have also taken into consideration the phenomenon of post-war violence, placing the end of the civil war beyond the official end of the Second World War in Europe. Therefore, for them, it is not easy to identify a real end date of the phenomenon, which slowly faded away. Some have proposed the Togliatti amnesty of 22 June 1946 as the end of the civil war.

=== Casualties ===
According to a book published in 1955 by an Italian ministerial committee on the tenth anniversary of the Liberation, casualties in Italy among the Resistance movement amounted to 35,828 partisans killed in action or executed, and 21,168 partisans mutilated or left disabled by their wounds. Another 32,000 Italian partisans had been killed abroad (in the Balkans and, to a lesser extent, in France). 9,980 Italian civilians had been killed in reprisals by the German and Fascist forces. In 2010, the Ufficio dell'Albo d'Oro of the Italian Ministry of Defence recorded 15,197 partisans killed; however, the Ufficio dell'Albo d'Oro only considered as partisans the members of the Resistance who were civilians before joining the partisans, whereas partisans who were formerly members of the Italian Armed Forces (more than half those killed) were considered as members of their armed force of origin.

=== Liberation Day ===
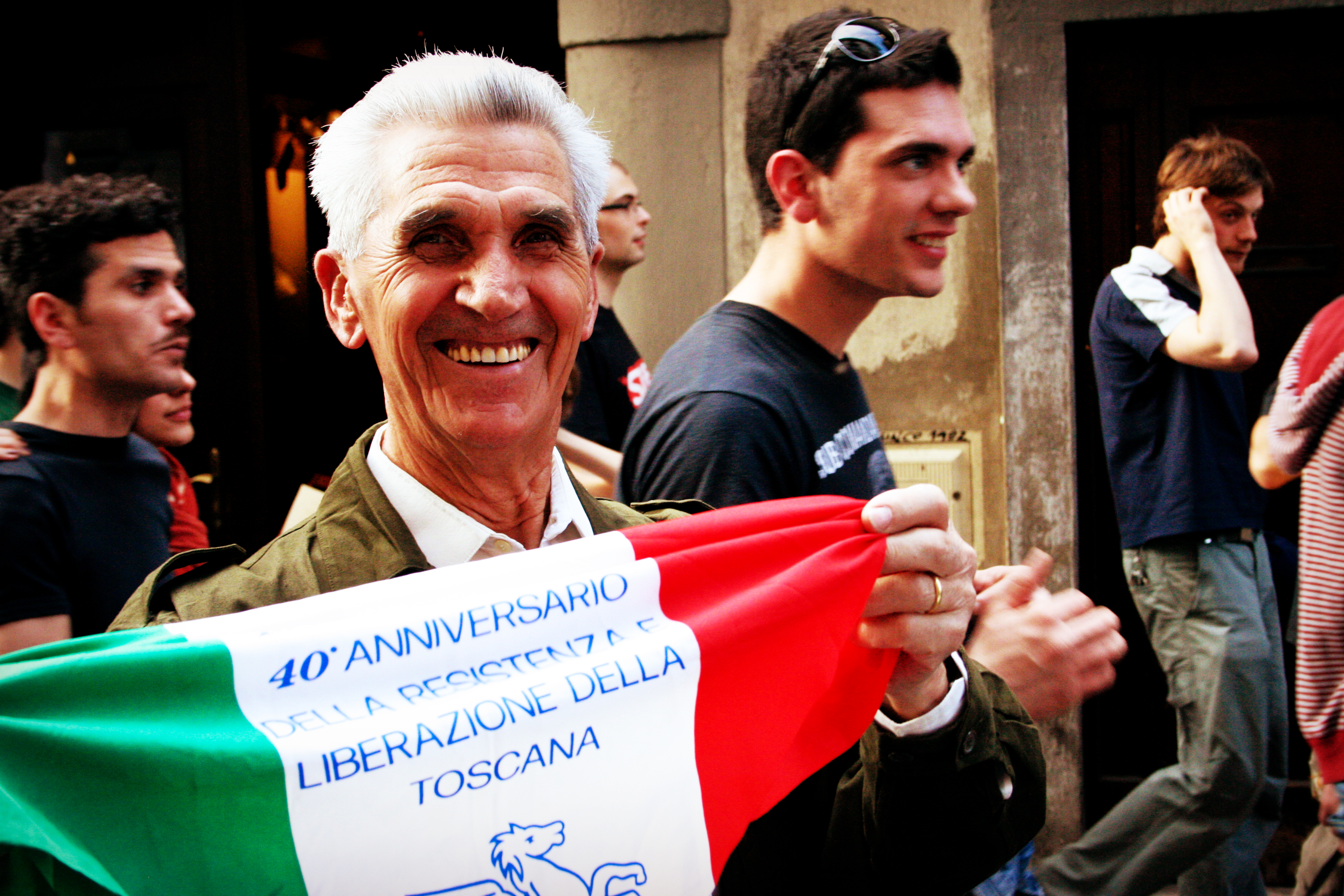
The 64th anniversary of the liberation of Italy in Florence (25 April 2009)

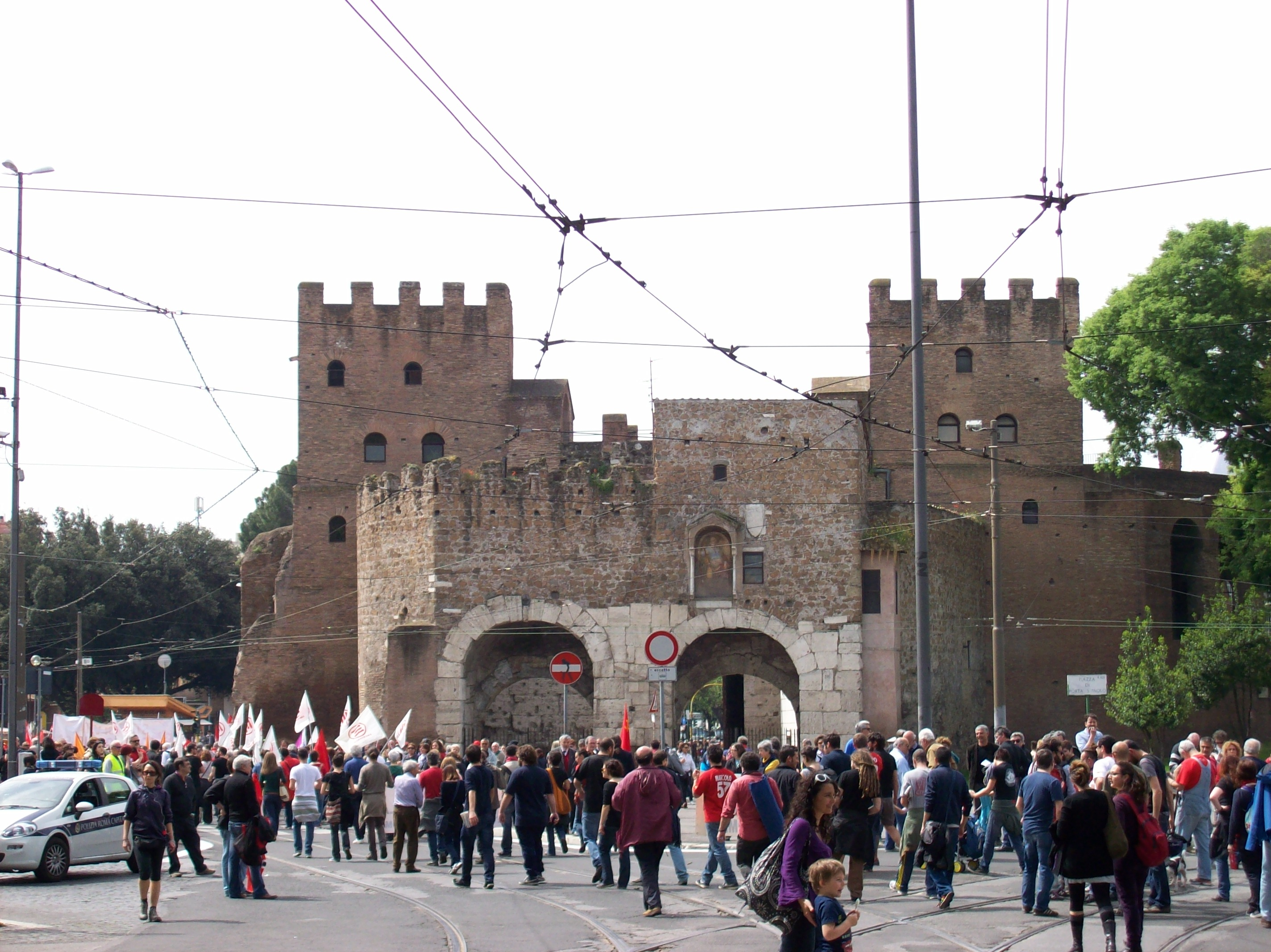
The 68th anniversary of the liberation of Italy at Porta San Paolo in Rome (25 April 2013)

Since 1946, 25 April has been officially celebrated as Liberation Day, also known as the Anniversary of the Resistance. It is a national holiday that commemorates the victory of the Italian resistance movement against Nazi Germany and the Italian Social Republic, puppet state of the Nazis and rump state of the fascists, during the liberation of Italy and the Italian Civil War during World War II. The date was chosen by convention, as it was the day of the year 1945 when the National Liberation Committee of Upper Italy (CLNAI) – whose command was based in Milan and was chaired by Alfredo Pizzoni, Luigi Longo, Emilio Sereni, Sandro Pertini, and Leo Valiani (present among others the designated president Rodolfo Morandi, Giustino Arpesani, and Achille Marazza) – proclaimed a general insurrection in all the territories still occupied by the Nazi-fascists, indicating to all the partisan forces active in Northern Italy that were part of the Volunteer Corps of Freedom to attack the fascist and German garrisons by imposing the surrender, days before the arrival of the Allied troops. "Surrender or die!" was the rallying call of the partisans that day and those immediately following.

Since then, public events in memory of the event, like marches and parades, have been organized annually in all Italian cities – especially in those decorated with military valour for the war of liberation. Among the events of the festival program, there is the solemn homage, by the President of Italy and other important officers of the State, to the chapel of the Italian Unknown Soldier (Milite Ignoto), buried in the Altare della Patria in Rome, with the deposition of a laurel wreath in memory of the fallen and missing Italians in wars. Speaking at the 2014 anniversary, President Giorgio Napolitano said: "The values and merits of the Resistance, from the Partisan movement and the soldiers who sided with the fight for liberation to the Italian armed forces, are indelible and beyond any rhetoric of mythicization or any biased denigration. The Resistance, the commitment to reconquer Italy's liberty and independence, was a great civil engine of ideals, but above all, it was a people in arms, a courageous mobilization of young and very young citizens who rebelled against foreign power."

== Aftermath ==
ANPI logo

Today's Italian constitution is the result of the work of the Constituent Assembly, which was formed by the representatives of all the anti-nazist and anti-fascist forces that contributed to the defeat of Nazi and Fascist forces during the Italian resistance and the Liberation of Italy.

Associazione Nazionale Partigiani d'Italia (ANPI; "National Association of Italian Partisans") is an association founded by participants of the Italian resistance against the Nazi occupation and the fascist and collaborationist Italian Social Republic during the latter phase of World War II. ANPI was founded in Rome in 1944 while the war continued in northern Italy. It was constituted as a charitable foundation on 5 April 1945. It persists due to the activity of its antifascist members. ANPI's objectives are the maintenance of the historical role of the partisan war by means of research and the collection of personal stories. Its goals are a continued defence against historical revisionism and the ideal and ethical support of the high values of freedom and democracy expressed in the 1948 constitution, in which the ideals of the Italian resistance were collected. Since 2008, every two years ANPI organizes its national festival. During the event, meetings, debates, and musical concerts that focus on antifascism, peace, and democracy are organized.

=== Bella ciao ===
Bella ciao (instrumental only version performed by the Band of the Guard of the Serbian Armed Forces)

Bella ciao (Italian: [ˈbɛlla ˈtʃaːo]; "Goodbye beautiful") is an Italian folk song wrongly considered to be the anthem of the Italian resistance movement by the partisans who opposed Nazism and Fascism. Versions of this song continue to be sung worldwide as a hymn of freedom and resistance. There are no indications of the relevance of "Bella ciao" among the partisan brigades, nor of the very existence of the 'partisan version' prior to the first publication of the text in 1953. There are no traces in the documents of the immediate postwar period nor its presence in important songbooks. It is not, for example, in Pasolini's 1955 Canzoniere Italiano nor in the Canti Politici of Editori Riuniti of 1962. The 1963 version of Yves Montand shot to fame after the group Il Nuovo Canzoniere Italiano presented it at the 1964 Festival dei Due Mondi at Spoleto both as a song of the mondine and as a partisan hymn, and the latter so "inclusive" that it could hold together the various political souls of the national liberation struggle (Catholics, Communists, Socialists, Liberals...) and even be sung at the end of the Christian Democracy (Democrazia Cristiana) 1975 congress which elected the former partisan Zaccagnini as national secretary".

Widely regarded as a resistance song, it became a symbol of the struggle against tyranny, and a symbol of the liberation of all people's rights.

== See also ==
- Resistance during World War II
- Italian partisan brigades, Italian resistance units
- Anti-fascism
- ANPI, an association of the participants to the Italian resistance
- Volante Rossa, an Italian communist antifascist militia active after WWII
- People's Squads, an Italian left-wing antifascist militia active during the early 1920s
- Lucetti Battalion, an Italian anarchist partisan brigade
- "Bella ciao", the anthem of the anti-nazist and anti-fascist resistance
- Mazzini Society, formed by expatriate Italian anti-Fascists in the United States
- Years of Lead (Italy)
- Anarchism in Italy
  - Anarchist brigades in the Italian Resistance
- German resistance to Nazism
- Japanese dissidence during the Showa period
- Museum of the Liberation of Rome
- Francesca Ciceri, an Italian anti-fascist partisan

=== In works of popular culture ===
- The Abandoned
- Achtung! Banditi!
- Bebo's Girl
- Beneath a Scarlet Sky
- Blood of the Losers
- Captain Corelli's Mandolin
- Cloak and Dagger
- A Day for Lionhearts
- A Day in Life
- The Dirty Dozen: The Deadly Mission
- Escape by Night
- Everybody Go Home
- The Fall of Italy
- 1900
- The Fallen
- The Fascist
- The Four Days of Naples
- From the Clouds to the Resistance
- The Night of the Shooting Stars
- Gangsters
- General della Rovere
- Harmony in Ultraviolet
- His Day of Glory
- Hornets' Nest
- La buona battaglia – Don Pietro Pappagallo
- The Hunchback of Rome
- Johnny the Partisan
- Last Days of Mussolini
- Little Teachers
- Long Night in 1943
- The Man Who Will Come
- Massacre in Rome
- The Mattei Affair
- Miracle at St. Anna
- Paisan
- The Path to the Nest of Spiders
- Porzûs
- Rome, Open City
- Tea with Mussolini
- The Seven Cervi Brothers
- The Sun Still Rises
- Ten Italians for One German
- Two Anonymous Letters
- Wild Blood

== Bibliography ==
- Colombo, Arturo (1979). Partiti e ideologie del movimento antifascista in: Storia d'Italia, vol. 8 (in Italian). De Agostini.[ISBN unspecified]
- De Felice, Renzo (1995). Rosso e Nero [Red and Black] (in Italian). Baldini & Castoldi. ISBN 88-85987-95-8.
- Pavone, Claudio (2006). A Civil War (in Italian). Bollati Boringhieri. ISBN 978-88-339-1676-7.
- Payne, Stanley G. (2011). Civil War in Europe, 1905–1949. Cambridge University Press. ISBN 9781139499644.
