= Schachenstein Castle =

Ruined castle in Austria

Burg Schachenstein
- Thörl
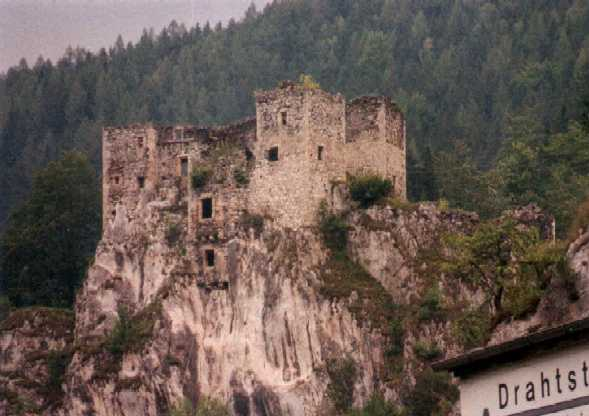

Site information
- Type: hill castle
- Code: AT-6
- Condition: ruin

Location
- Location within Austria
- Coordinates: 47°31′07″N 15°13′12″E
- Height: 640 m (AA)

Site history
- Built: 1464

The ruins of Schachenstein Castle (German: Burg Schachenstein) are located in the municipality of Thörl, above the village not far from the Thörlbach stream and north of Bruck an der Mur in the Styria, Austria.

Schachenstein Castle was the last hill castle to be built in the Styria. Its primary role was as a fortified, lordly residence, thus no subjects were in service to the castle captains. The castle was never besieged, despite serious unrest such as the Baumkircher feud and Turkish raids.

== Location ==
The site of castle was an outstanding choice: some 640 above sea level on rocks forming the southern spur of the Schöckelberg. It is situated on an easily defended constriction of the road from Einodgräben to Mariazell, which was originally also guarded by a fortified gateway.

== Purpose ==
The main purpose of the fortification was as a home and summer residence of the abbots of Saint Lambert's Abbey as evinced by a large number of historic records. Subsequently, it was used to seal off the Mariazell road and protect the population of the Aflenz valley — who were looked after by the abbey — as well as providing a refuge during Turkish and Hungarian invasions.

== History ==
The castle was built in 1464 by Abbot John II Schachner of Lambrecht as a summer residence and lordly manor. It was extended in 1630 and 1740. From the end of the 18th century the castle lost its significance and fell into ruins.

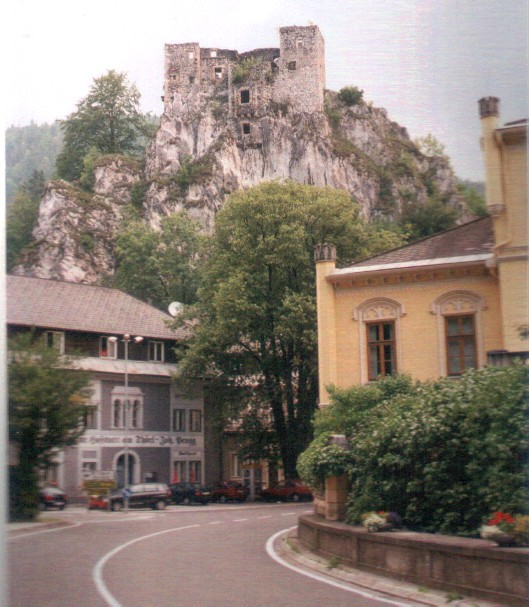
The ruins of Schachenstein

== See also ==
- List of castles in Austria
