= George Dunning (author) =

British WWII soldier and author

- Born: Stoke-on-Trent, England
- Military career
- Allegiance: United Kingdom
- Branch: British Army
- Service years: 1939–1945
- Rank: Private
- Unit: Lincolnshire Regiment
- Conflicts: World War II
- Awards: Distinguished Conduct Medal
- Other work: Author of Where Bleed the Many (1955)

George Dunning was an author who wrote an account of his time fighting with Italian Partisans during World War II. He was awarded the Distinguished Conduct Medal in 1945.

Dunning was born in Stoke-on-Trent but after marrying lived in Kent.

He was serving with the Lincolnshire Regiment when he was captured in Belgium in May 1940. A succession of thwarted prison escapes saw him identified for repatriation. The negotiations failed and he promptly escaped before being sent to Germany. Unfortunately he was recaptured and this time sent to a camp in Carpi Italy. With the Italians withdrawing from the war the camp was taken over by the Germans on 9 August 1943. With the Allies advancing up the Italian peninsular arrangements were made to send the prisoners back to Germany, but Dunning hid with four others in a dug-out for five days before escape.

Separated from his fellow escapees he linked up with partisans and during the following eight months fought in Italy and Yugoslavia in a number of actions. In July 1944 he was part of the partisan force that participated in the rebel occupation of San Severino and then handed in his arms reporting to AMGOT officials.

Dunning was awarded the Distinguished Conduct Medal in 1945 and published an account of his wartime exploits, called “Where bleed the many” in April 1955.
