= Montechino Castle =

Coordinates: 44.8047°N 9.6833°E

Montechino Castle is located in Montechino village, in the municipality of Gropparello, in the Riglio valley, province of Piacenza, Italy. It is situated on the crest of Monte Occhino hill, overlooking the Riglio river.

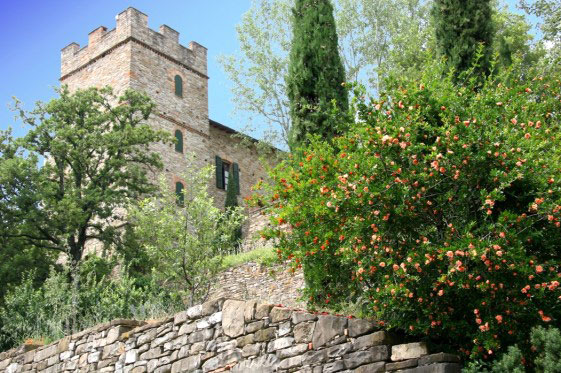
The Montechino Castle in Riglio valley

== History ==
Montechino Castle was built in the 12th century as a strategic outpost to defend the Riglio valley. The castle controlled an important trade route between northern and southern Europe. It served those on pilgrimage to Rome or to Santiago de Compostela, in Galicia, Spain. According to the Enciclopedia Treccani, after returning from the Crusades the Confalonieri family from Piacenza took control of the castle in the early 12th century. In 1393 Gian Galeazzo Visconti, Duke of Milan, while solidifying his control of the area, conferred the feudal title of Count and the lands surrounding Montechino to the family as vassal allies. In 1492 they sold the castle and all its land in the valley to the aristocratic Nicelli family who continued to improve the property. By 1842 it was controlled by Count Marazzani. In 1944, during the latter stages of World War II, in the italian resistance movement a famous Italian partisan division occupied the castle using it as their headquarters in their fight against Nazi occupation. In 1955 it was bought by Monsignor Stefano Fumagalli, archbishop of San Polo, who converted the castle to a retirement home for nuns. In 1986 it returned to private hands and was restored it to its original design as a stately home.

== Description ==
The castle was built from large rectangular stones. It features an archetypical defensive tower topped by battlements with Guelphs merlon. These fortifications were needed during the 14th and 15th centuries when powerful rival families fought for control over the region. Still visible are the original decorative gables, the foundations of a medieval bridge, and the original drawbridge apparatus.

== See also ==
- Filippo Maria Visconti
- Gian Galeazzo Visconti
- Guelphs merlons
- Hill castle
- Italian resistance movement
- Montechino
- Piacenza

== Sources ==
- Carmen Artocchini. Castelli piacentini - Edizioni TEP Piacenza 1967
- Enciclopedia Treccani - Istituto dell'Enciclopedia Italiana - Roma
- Daniela Guerrieri. Castelli del Ducato di Parma e Piacenza - NLF
