= Mario Ciceri =

Italian Catholic priest, Venerated Catholic

Blessed Mario Ciceri

Priest
- Born: 8 September 1900; Veduggio, Milan, Kingdom of Italy
- Died: 4 April 1945 (aged 44); Brentana di Sulbiate, Monza e Brianza, Kingdom of Italy
- Venerated in: Roman Catholic Church
- Beatified: 30 April 2022, Santa Maria Nascente, Milan, Italy by Cardinal Marcello Semeraro
- Feast: 14 June
- Attributes: Priest's cassock

Mario Ciceri (8 September 1900 – 4 April 1945) was an Italian Roman Catholic priest from Milan. He was born to farmers and had an inclination to enter the priesthood since his childhood; he studied in Bergamo and in Milan before he was ordained as a priest at the Duomo in 1924 and was assigned his first pastoral role at a local parish church. Ciceri became renowned for his diligent attention to the poor and to the sick and also focused on children and teenagers. He revitalized Catholic Action in his area and was responsible for having recruited teens into the movement.

His canonization cause was initiated in 2002 in Milan and he later became titled as Venerable on 1 December 2016 after Pope Francis confirmed that he had lived a life of heroic virtue. Ciceri was beatified in Milan on 30 April 2022.

== Life ==
Mario Ciceri was born at Veduggio as the fourth of six children to the farmers Luigi Ciceri and Colomba Vimrcati; his uncle Francesco married Giuseppina Galbiati but upon her death the Ciceri household opened itself to him and his thirteen children (Galbiati had died in childbirth with her thirteenth and final child). The Ciceri household experienced economic hardship but he received his initial education from his mother who was a devout Catholic.

From the age of eight, Ciceri expressed a strong desire to enter the priesthood and confided his inclination to the Veduggio parish priest, Carlo Maria Colombo. The latter took charge to inform his parents and his parents expressed their delight in their son's plans despite the economic conditions that would impede his education. However, his commitment as a student saw Ciceri achieve several scholarships and entrances to facilities that enabled for him to continue school and complete his theological and pastoral formation.

In May 1908, he received his confirmation and made his First Communion later in May 1910. Upon the conclusion of his third grade, he continued his studies at the Gervasoni college in Valnegra in Bergamo. On 6 October 1912, he was vested in the clerical cassock and entered the diocesan seminary at San Pietro in Seveso. He became noted during his time there for his exceptional conduct as a serious, committed, available, and active student that left an impression on his companions and superiors. With the beginning of his second grade in high school, in October 1918, he relocated to support himself in his education to the Collegio Rotondi in Gorla Minore and then continued with his theological education at the institute for seminarians in Porta Venezia in Milan and not far from the Duomo.

In 1923, he received the minor orders and the first two major ones before the Archbishop of Milan, Cardinal Eugenio Tosi, ordained him to the priesthood in the Duomo on 14 June 1924. Ciceri had become a subdeacon on 26 May 1923 and then was ordained to the diaconate on 23 December. He celebrated his first Mass at Veduggio with his family and fellow villagers present the day after his ordination. Not long after this, he was appointed as the coadjutor at the Sant'Antonino Martire parish church in Brentana di Sulbiate and it was there that he carried out his pastoral duties for most of his life as a priest. He made his formal entry into the parish on 29 June. Ciceri had a strong devotion to the Blessed Virgin Mary and recited the rosary daily, promoting the construction of the grotto of Our Lady of Lourdes in the oratory at Brentana; he consistently recommended the sick to her intercession and often taught teenagers and children to trust in her intercession. He likewise distinguished himself for his charitable works towards the poor and the sick; he often visited the sick and the poor in their homes and sometimes provided them with financial aid and even spent entire nights in prayer at their bedside. Tales from the village tell of him splitting wood for one person before making polenta for another. Ciceri also tended to the prisoners in prison and during World War II, despite the risks to his person involved, tended to soldiers and stragglers and other war victims who, through his work, were able to find appropriate shelters in safe locations. Ciceri also gave a new impetus to the Catholic Action movement, and was able to successfully convince teenagers to consider supporting it. Ciceri also helped to repair the buildings, acting at different times as a carpenter, bricklayer, and electrical engineer, using these skills to build the Our Lady of Lourdes grotto replica.

On 9 February 1945, while cycling back that evening to his parish from Verderio Inferiore where he had gone to hear confessions, he was struck by a cart whose driver did not stop to help him. One part from the vehicle struck his groin and lacerated his liver. Found a few hours later in a critical condition, he was immediately hospitalized at the Vimercate hospital where he offered his suffering to God. Parishioners, particularly the younger ones, lined up to donate blood to preserve his life, but Ciceri would say: "If the Lord wants my poor life, I will gladly offer it to Him, for the war to end, for the soldiers to return, especially ours; I offer it to You for my parishioners to whom I loved so much, for poor sinners". He died on 4 April 1945 and his funeral on 7 April at the Brentana parish saw large crowds gather from the neighboring villages. His remains are housed at the Sant'Antonino Martire parish church near the altar of the Madonna.

== Beatification ==
The beatification process commenced on 14 December 2002 once the Congregation for the Causes of Saints issued the official "nihil obstat" (no objections) edict that enabled for the Milan archdiocese to launch the diocesan process to assess his life and reputation for holiness. The Milanese archdiocese launched that process on 20 September 2003 and it concludes its business on 14 June 2004. The process moved to the C.C.S. in Rome and the latter validated the diocesan process on 30 September 2005 after it determined that the evidence collected met their rules and regulations. The postulation (officials that manage the cause) drafted and submitted the "Positio" dossier to the C.C.S. in 2008 to be assessed.

Nine theologians approved the dossier on 24 November 2015 and the cardinal and bishop members in the C.C.S. also approved the cause on 15 November 2016. Pope Francis confirmed on 1 December 2016 that Ciceri could be titled as Venerable after the Pope determined that the late priest had lived a model life of heroic virtue. The miracle needed for Ciceri to be beatified - a medical healing that neither science nor medicine can explain - was investigated in a diocesan process before the C.C.S. validated that process in a decree issued on 5 December 2008. Pope Francis approved that miracle on 23 November 2020 and it enabled for Ciceri's beatification to be celebrated though the COVID-19 pandemic postponed plans until the pandemic eased enough for the rite to be celebrated. The beatification took place at the Milan Duomo on 30 April 2022.

The current postulator for the cause is Francesca Consolini.
