= Montechino =

- Frazione
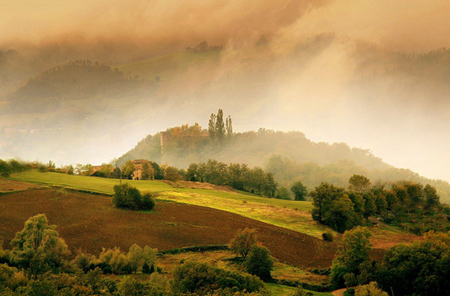
- Montechino in the Val Riglio

- Location of Montechino in Italy
- Coordinates: 44°48′16″N 9°41′25″E
- Country: Italy
- Region: Emilia-Romagna
- Province: Province of Piacenza (PC)
- Comune: Gropparello
- Elevation: 524 m (1,719 ft)

Population
  - Total: 40
- Time zone: UTC+1 (CET)
  - Summer (DST): UTC+2 (CEST)
- Postal code: 29025
- Dialing code: 0523
- Website: Official website

Montechino is a hamlet of forty inhabitants. It is a frazione of the comune of Gropparello, in the province of Piacenza, in Emilia-Romagna, Italy.

== Geography ==
Montechino lies in the Val Riglio, part of the Val Nure. The village is 524 metres (1,719 ft) above sea level, 6.6 kilometres (4.1 mi) from Gropparello and 36 kilometres (22 mi) from Piacenza.

== History ==
For centuries, the feudal lords of the Nicelli family ruled much of the Val Nure. However, Montechino and its defensive fortress castle were controlled by the Confalonieri family, vassals of the Duke of Milan, Filippo Maria Visconti. Visconti had guaranteed the autonomy of the "Magnificent University of Val Nure", located near Montechino, in an effort to offset the power of the Nicelli. Further measures were implemented by the Duke in the form of tax relief, administrative autonomy and the power to appoint local judges. In 1492, the Confalonieri family sold Montechino Castle and its lands to Bartolino Nicelli, along with the title of count and all attendant feudal rights.

== Economy ==
Montechino possessed natural gas and oil deposits that were used by local industry from 1866 to 1950. Peak production was reached in the early-20th century, when a pipeline was built to carry the oil to refineries in Fiorenzuola d'Arda. The oil fields were among the targets attacked by fighters and fighter-bombers of the XXII Tactical Air Command on 7 April 1945 during the spring 1945 offensive of the Liberation of Italy.

Every year in mid-August, the "Feast of Mines & Oil Rigs" is held to commemorate the hamlet's history with music, local food and produce, wine tasting, popular games, and an exhibit of art and historic photographs.
