= Francesca Ciceri =

Italian anti-fascist partisan

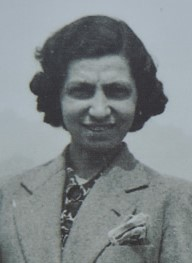
- Born: 23 August 1904; Lecco, Italy
- Died: 18 January 1988 (aged 83); Lecco, Italy
- Political party: Italian Communist Party; French Communist Party
- Movement: Italian resistance movement
- Spouse: Gaetano "Nino" Invernizzi

Francesca Ciceri (23 August 1904 – 18 January 1988), also known under her nom de guerre Vera, was an Italian anti-fascist partisan, communist, and feminist.

== Biography ==
Born in Lecco in 1904, she lost her father and began working in a factory at the age of ten. She began to frequent unions and participate in the occupation of factories during the strikes of 1919–1920. It was at this time that she met Gaetano "Nino" Invernizzi, who soon became her companion in political activism as well as in private life.

=== Marriage and Communist Party activism ===
In 1922, Invernizzi joined the Communist Party of Italy and was soon forced to emigrate to Paris. Ciceri managed to join him there in 1924. They married the next year. In 1929, Ciceri joined the French Communist Party, starting a long period of political commitment in the Italian-speaking group of the French Communist Party. Because of political persecution, she was forced to move with her husband to Belgium and then to Luxembourg.

In 1932, they returned to Paris and were given the task of making clandestine trips to Italy to introduce the party press and reorganize the communist apparatus, while in the following two years they were invited to Moscow at the School of the Communist International. On their return in 1935, they resumed their journeys to Italy until their arrest, which took place in Milan on 13 June 1936. On 22 May 1937, the Special Court for the Defence of the State sentenced Invernizzi to 14 years and Ciceri to 8, on charges of conspiracy against the State and the re-establishment of the Communist Party.

Ciceri was imprisoned at the women's penitentiary in Perugia, where she served four years and left, following an amnesty, in 1941. She then returned to Lecco, where she found a job and resumed political activity. After the fall of Mussolini on 25 July 1943, Invernizzi was also released from prison and resumed his political activities in Lecco, alternating his work underground with the partisan struggle in the mountains.

=== The battle of Piani d'Erna ===
On 9 September 1943, Ciceri participated in the partisan group "Carlo Pisacane", commanded by Renato Carenini, of which Invernizzi was political commissary. Thus began the Resistance in the mountains of Lecco. The battle of Piani d'Erna, in which Ciceri took part, took place on 17 October 1943. The Fascists managed to break through the lines of the Resistance, and the partisans (including Ciceri and Invernizzi) were forced to retreat to Valsassina and the Bergamo area.

After the battle, Invernizzi and Ciceri were both called by the Party to Milan. In 1944, Ciceri lost her brother Pietro, who was deported to the Mauthausen concentration camp, and her 21-year-old nephew Lino, who was arrested in Lecco and shot during the Cibeno massacre. Her husband was seriously ill due to the eight hard years he had spent in prison.

=== The end of the war ===
After the Liberation, Invernizzi took on important union duties and was elected to the Chamber of Deputies for the Italian Communist Party. Ciceri continued her activity, directing the network of Gruppi di Difesa della Donna (Women's Defence Groups) and entering the Committee of the Milanese Federation of the Party, activities that she had to subsequently reduce for health reasons and to attend to her seriously ill husband.

After Invernizzi's death in 1959, Ciceri returned to settle in Lecco, becoming president of the provincial section of the National Association of Italian Partisans between 1980 and 1988. In 1977, the city of Lecco awarded her the gold medal for patriotic and civil merits.

She died in her hometown in 1988 and was buried at the cemetery of Acquate, next to her husband. In January 2019, two memorial blocks were placed for her brother Pietro and her nephew Lino in front of their home in Via Resegone, 16.
