= Giovanna d'Acquapendente =

Neapolitan noblewoman

Giovanna d'Acquapendente was a 15th-century noblewoman from the Kingdom of Naples. She was known as 'la Colombina' and was the lover of Francesco I Sforza for the seventeen years between the death of his first wife Polissena Ruffo (1420) and his second marriage to Bianca Maria Visconti, daughter of Filippo Maria Visconti (1441). Visconti took Francesco's illegitimate children under her wing after the marriage.

Giovanna lived at the castle in Fermo with her children until Francesco was made lord of the March of Ancona. From then on she lived with her children in the castles at Abbiategrasso, Lodi, Melegnano, Pavia and Binasco, taking part in hunts, banquets and processions.

== Issue ==
She had five confirmed illegitimate children with Francesco, of whom three reached adulthood:

- Polissena, died in early infancy
- Polissena Sforza (1428–1449), married Sigismondo Pandolfo Malatesta
- Sforza (1430–1433)
- Sforza Secondo Sforza (1433–1492 or 1493), count of Borgonuovo, married Antonia del Verme;
- Drusiana Sforza (30 September 1437 - 29 June 1474), married Jacopo Piccinino.

Other sources also attribute two more of Francesco's illegitimate children to her:

- Tristano (1422/24-1477), married Beatrice d'Este, illegitimate daughter of Niccolò III d'Este
- Isotta (1425-1485/87), married Andrea Matteo d'Acquaviva
