= Sforza Maria Sforza =

Duke of Bari (1451–1479)

Sforza Maria Sforza (18 August 1451 — 29 July 1479), Duke of Bari from 1464 to 1479, was a son of the condottiero Francesco I Sforza and his wife Bianca Maria Visconti.

== Early life ==
Sforza Maria, the third son of his parents, was born on 18 August 1451 in Vigevano.

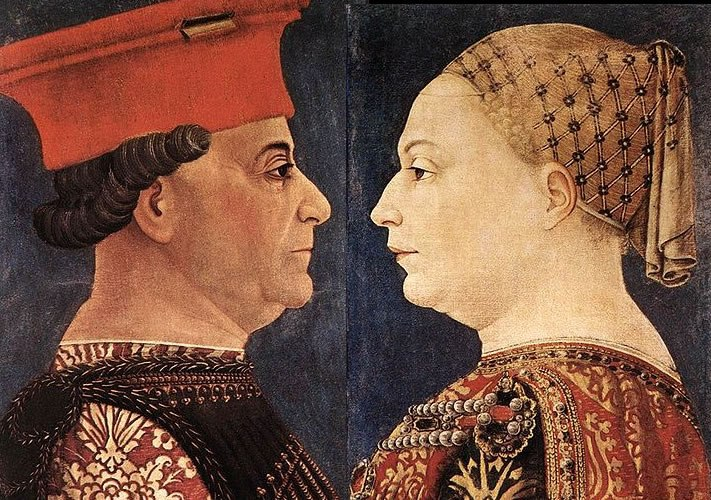
Bianca Maria Visconti and Francesco I Sforza,parents of Sforza Maria

His mother, Bianca Maria Visconti,was the only daughter of Filippo Maria Visconti and his mistress Agnese del Maino. His paternal grandparents were the condottotiere Muzio Attendolo Sforza (who was the founder of the Sforza family) and his mistress Lucia Tregani (or Troziano)

Both of his given names carried significance: His first name Sforza, meaning 'the force' in Italian, had been the nickname of his paternal grandfather; his own father had chosen to adopt it as the name of their house. His second given name arose from a tradition on his mother's side of the family. A vow by his maternal great-grandparents Gian Galeazzo Visconti and Caterina Visconti to add the epicene name "Maria" – usually considered a feminine name – to their sons' names if the Virgin Mary would grant them children, was the origin of this family custom (one that has recurred in various European cultures at various time periods, into the contemporary period).

Sforza Maria's father and mother, the duke and duchess of Milan, had a good relationship despite their age gap, but his father was often unfaithful, and it is thought that he fathered at least 15 children between his wife and his mistresses. Bianca Maria usually reacted to her husband's extramarital affairs by ignoring them.

== Education ==
Bianca Maria aimed to give her children a humanist education, such as she herself had enjoyed; she therefore had them educated by the humanist scholars Baldo Martorello da Serra de´Conti and Giorgio Valagussa. Sforza Maria was taught Latin. He and his siblings were encouraged in their love of music and hunting by their mother, as she herself had enjoyed such princely pursuits.

Sforza Maria's maternal grandmother, Agnese del Mainoo, also resided at the ducal court; she was a prominent part of the Sforza siblings' childhood, helping to oversee the education of her grandchildren.

== Betrothal ==
At the age of four, Sforza Maria was betrothed to Eleanor of Naples, the daughter of Ferdinand I of Naples. Sforza Maria's older sister Ippolita was also betrothed to Eleanor's older brother Alfonso around the same time.

This double betrothal was to cement the allegiance between Milan and Naples: Francesco I Sforza, Sforza Maria's father, had supported Eleanor's grandfather, Alfonso, the Aragonese king of Naples, against the pro-Angevin Conspiracy of the Barons, which had aimed to restore Angevin rule in Naples. Ferdinand I had therefore in 1462 rewarded Francesco Sforza by reconfirming all his possessions, including the fief of Modugno. This was all part of a scheme by the duke of Milan to firmly establish his dynasty and become part of the Italian League which would enable him, and his heir Galeazzo, to be included in the treaty of Lodi, which guaranteed 40 years of peace to its members.

Ferdinand, in turn, to strengthen his alliance with the Duke of Milan, promised to grant his future son-in-law Sforza Maria Sforza the fiefdom Rossano, held by one of the leaders of the barons' conspiracy. However, in the course of the war, the Prince of Rossano made peace with Ferdinand I, who then had to find an alternative to honor the promise. Thus, Sforza Maria was granted the Duchy of Bari by Ferdinand.

== Life under the reign of Galeazzo Maria ==
When his father Francesco Sforza died in 1466 after falling from his horse, he was succeeded by his eldest son and Sforza Maria's oldest brother Galeazzo Maria Sforza. Their mother initially acted has an advisor to her son, but after barely a year, Galeazzo tired of her wanting to be involved in government and forced her to leave Milan. Bianca Maria then moved to Cremona, her dower city.

Sforza Maria and his brothers were not happy with this and claimed that it had been the wish of their father that all of Francesco sons should share power over Milan. Another cause for discord between Sforza Maria and his brother was the matter of his marriage to Eleanor of Naples. The marriage (by proxy) took place in 1465, but his brother Galeazzo refused to honor the marriage settlements, so Eleanor remained in Naples. Galeazzo also refused to annul the marriage unless Eleanor's father sent his granddaughter, Isabella of Aragon (and Sforza Maria's and Galeazzo's niece) to the Milanese court, to be brought up there and eventually be married to Galeazzo's son and heir Gian Galeazzo. The marriage of Sforza Maria and Eleanor was dissolved in 1672 and she was married to Ercole d´Este instead. In 1467, Sforza Maria was given Borgonovo, the fiefdom of his half-brother, Sforza Secondo Sforza.

In 1468 Sforza Maria's mother Bianca Maria, traveling to attend Galeazzo's wedding to Bona of Savoy, became ill and, after ailing for several months, died. The manner of her death raised suspicions; her son Galeazzo Maria was accused of having poisoned her. These suspicions were not completely unfounded as her own grandmother Caterina Visconti had been poisoned by her own son.

For this and other reasons, the relationship between Sforza Maria and his brother Galeazzo was already strained when, in 1476, rumors that Sforza Maria and Ludovico were planning to assassinate Galeazzo gained currency. Suspicions were strong enough that in November of that year, Galeazzo Maria sent his brothers to France with the explanation that "they wanted to see the world". It was however apparent that they did not leave of their own free will, but rather had been exiled. There they would be kept under the close watch of the king of France Louis XI, who was brother-in-law to Galeazzo's wife Bona, having married her sister, Charlotte of Savoy.

Just a month later on 26 December 1476, Galeazzo was assassinated by three young noblemen on the porch of the cathedral church of San Stefano. Gian Galeazzo, just eight years old, became the new duke of Milan under the regency of his mother Bona of Savoy. Bona enlisted the help of chancellor Cicco Simonetta to strengthen her position as regent against her brothers-in-law. Some compromise was made when Ludovico Gonzaga and the Pope intervened; the Sforza Maria and his brothers were given annual pensions as well as a fortress and a palace for each of them.

This compromise only lasted so long: Sforza Maria, along with his brothers Ludovico, Ascanio and Ottaviano, tried to oust Cicco Simoetta and take the regency, but the coup was unsuccessful and they were driven out of Milan. During their escape, Sforza Maria's younger brother Ottaviano attempted to flee by crossing the river Adda and drowned.

Maria Sforza was exiled to Bari, his own duchy, where he devoted himself to the breeding of horses.

== Death ==
On 29 July 1479, Sforza Maria died near Varese Ligure, allegedly poisoned on the order of Cicco Simonetta.

As he died without an heir, the duchy reverted to the king of Naples. Ferdinand I of Naples granted the duchy to Sforza Maria's brother Ludovico il Moro, in an order dated 14 August 1479.

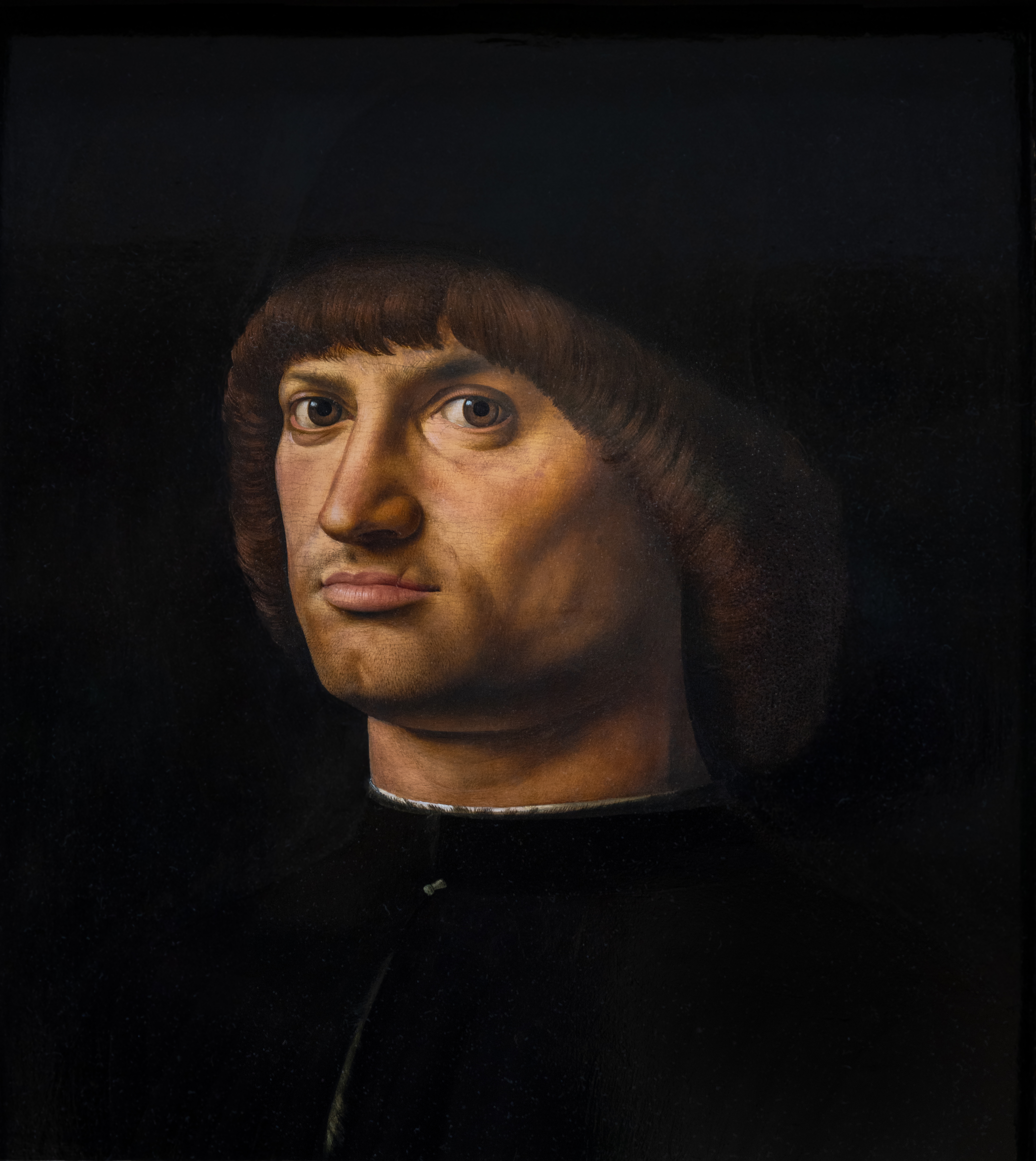
Portrait of a man (c. 1475) attributed to Antonello da Messina. Louvre. It has been theorized that it is a portrait of Sforza Maria Sforza

== Possible portrait by Antonio da Messina ==
"Portrait of a man", known as "The Condottiere", is currently at the Louvre. Because the dating of the painting (1475) coincides with the Sforzas' mention of the artist, it has been theorized that it is a likeness of Sforza Maria Sforza; some identify it with a young Lorenzo de Medici or with Giorgio Cornaro.

In 1475 Sforza Maria returned from Venice with a portrait of himself that he showed to his brother Galeazzo.

... since our brother the most illustrious Duke of Bari has brought us a portrait drawn from life by a Sicilian painter established in the city [Venice]

— Galeazzo Maria Sforza, Letter to Leonardo Botta, Patrons and Artists in the Italian Renaissance. p. 152

Galeazzo Maria Sforza, acting on the praise of his brother for the artist, wrote instructing his agent in Venice to secure the services of Antonello da Messina. In March 1476 Antonello received an invitation to enter the service of the Duke of Milan. Antonello initially accepted the offer; but by the following September he had returned to Messina, possibly to escape the plague.
