= Sforza Secondo Sforza =

Italian condottiero

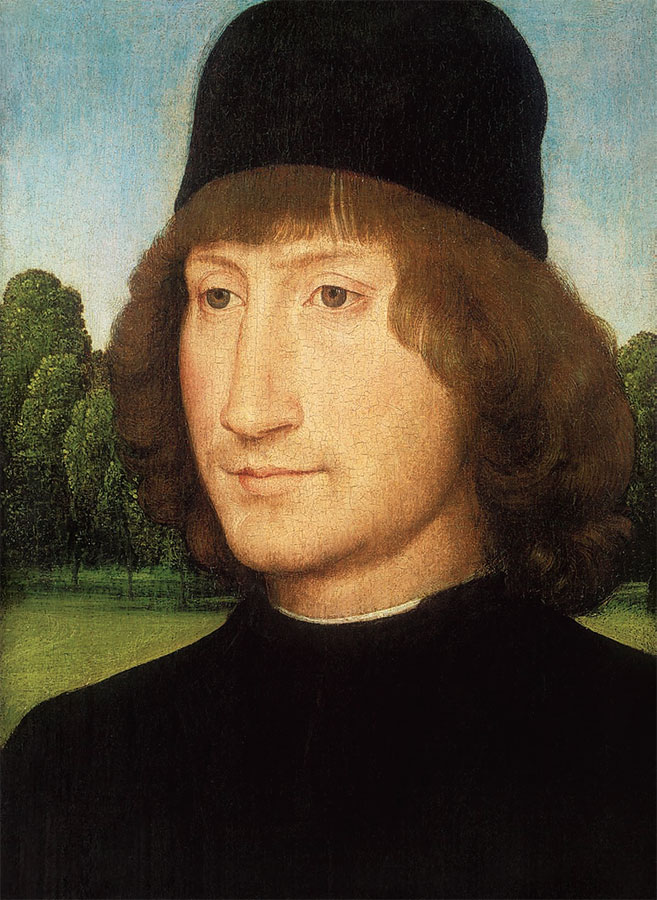
Sforza Secondo by Hans Memling, 1480 (Kunsthaus Zürich).

Sforza Secondo Sforza (1433 - 1492/1493) was an Italian condottiero.

== Life ==
Born in Grottammare, he was the illegitimate son of Francesco Sforza by his lover Giovanna d'Acquapendente.

In 1442 his father was negotiating with Alfonso V of Aragon to have Sforza Secundo marry Alfonso's illegitimate daughter Maria d´Aragona but these plans fell through and she was instead betrothed to Leonello d´Este.

Sforza Secondo and his two sisters Polissena and Drusiana were legitimized in 1448 by the pope Nicholas V.

In 1451 he married Antonia dal Verme (?–1487) the daughter of the condottiero Luigi dal Verme; and to mark the occasion Sforza's father granted him the county of Borgonovo. He and Tiberto Brandolini tried to come to the assistance of Giovanni d'Angiò in his battle against the kingdom of Aragon, but in 1461 Sforza was captured and was only freed thanks to his wife's petition. He only had one legitimate child by her, Giovanna, who died in 1453.

After the death of his father in 1466 and on the accession of Galeazzo Maria as the new Duke of Milan, he defected and Borgonovo was then given to his legitimate brother Sforza Maria. Galeazzo Maria eventually managed to persuade him to come back to Milan.

He was reinstated in his lands by Ludovico il Moro, who put him in charge of the war against the Republic of Genoa, which had rebelled against the Adorno family. However, Sforza was defeated and in 1482 he was sent to invade the territories of the county of San Secondo and besiege the Rocca dei Rossi during the Rossi War, forcing Pier Maria II de' Rossi to flee to his castle at Torrechiara. In 1483 he was promoted to captain general and fought against Parma, which had attempted to rebel against the Sforzas, and the following year he was made governor of Piacenza. When il Moro fell, Sforza Secondo fled to Naples, where he probably died between 1492 and 1493.

== Illegitimate issue ==
- Jacopetto, later legitimated
- Lucrezia, married Antonio Anguissola
- Francesco (?–1491), later legitimated, married Franceschina Borromeo
- Polissena
- Leone, later legitimated

Italian nobility
New creation	County of Borgonovo; 1468-1492	Succeeded by Francesco I
