= Palazzo Dal Verme =

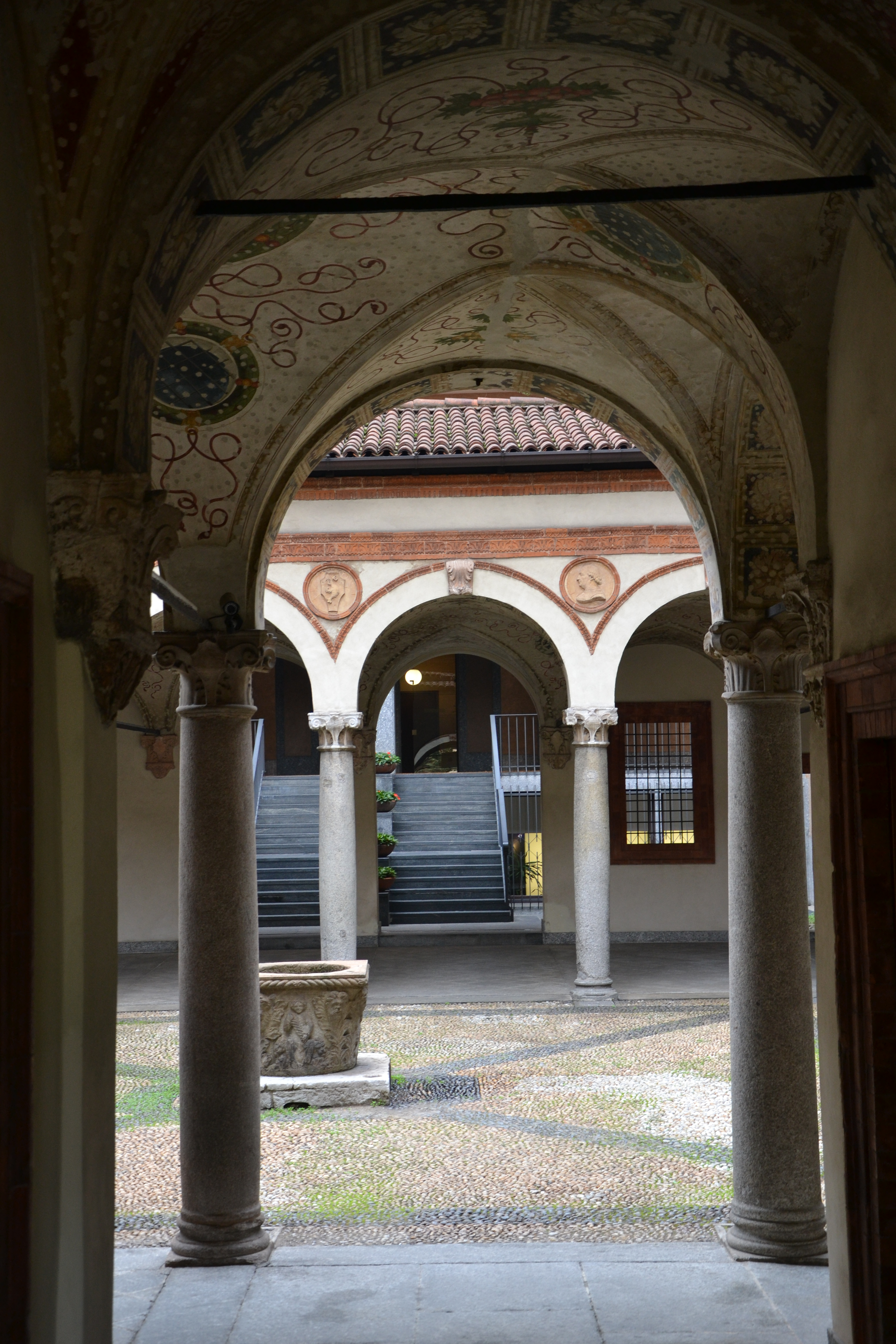
- Palace Court
- Interactive map of the Palazzo Dal Verme area

General information
- Status: In use
- Type: Palace
- Architectural style: Renaissance architecture
- Location: Milan, Italy, 3, Via Giacomo Puccini
- Coordinates: 45.466595°N 9.18504°E
- Construction started: 15th century

Design and construction
- Architect: unknown

The Palazzo Dal Verme was the noble residence of one of the most powerful families of the Visconti and Sforza court in the 15th century. The courtyard remains today, one of the greatest examples of civil construction from the Renaissance era in Milan. It is located at 3 Via Giacomo Puccini.

== History and description ==
The palace was built by Luigi Dal Verme (1390—1449), count of Sanguinetto, in the middle of the 15th century on land in the Contrada of San Giovanni sul muro donated by the Dukes of Milan. I Dal Verme began his career as a condottiere in the service of Conte di Carmagnola, whose daughter, Luchina Bussone, he married. He was then a captain of fortune under the insignia of Filippo Maria Visconti, from whom he obtained the fiefs of Bobbio and Voghera, and after the latter's death fought alongside Francesco Sforza. The construction was then continued by his son Pietro and grandson Federico.

The complex, which survived in good condition until the 20th century, was badly hit by bombs in 1943, which destroyed its façade. The courtyard survives today, as part of a modern post-war condominium complex.

The courtyard is accessed through an entrance hall, which features the original Renaissance decoration consisting of frescoes covering the cross vaults, supported by carved corbels. The regular courtyard is opened by porticoes on the four sides of four arches each. The arches are supported by stone columns surmounted by composite capitals with acanthus leaves, which house horse-head plaques with coats of arms that are no longer legible. Above the arches runs a decoration of terracotta cornices and cords, restored to their surviving parts. Between the spandrels of the arches, a series of stone roundels alternates noble coats of arms with profiles of personages from the Sforza court. In the centre, a sculpted well-curb, dating back to the 15th century.

== Picture Gallery ==
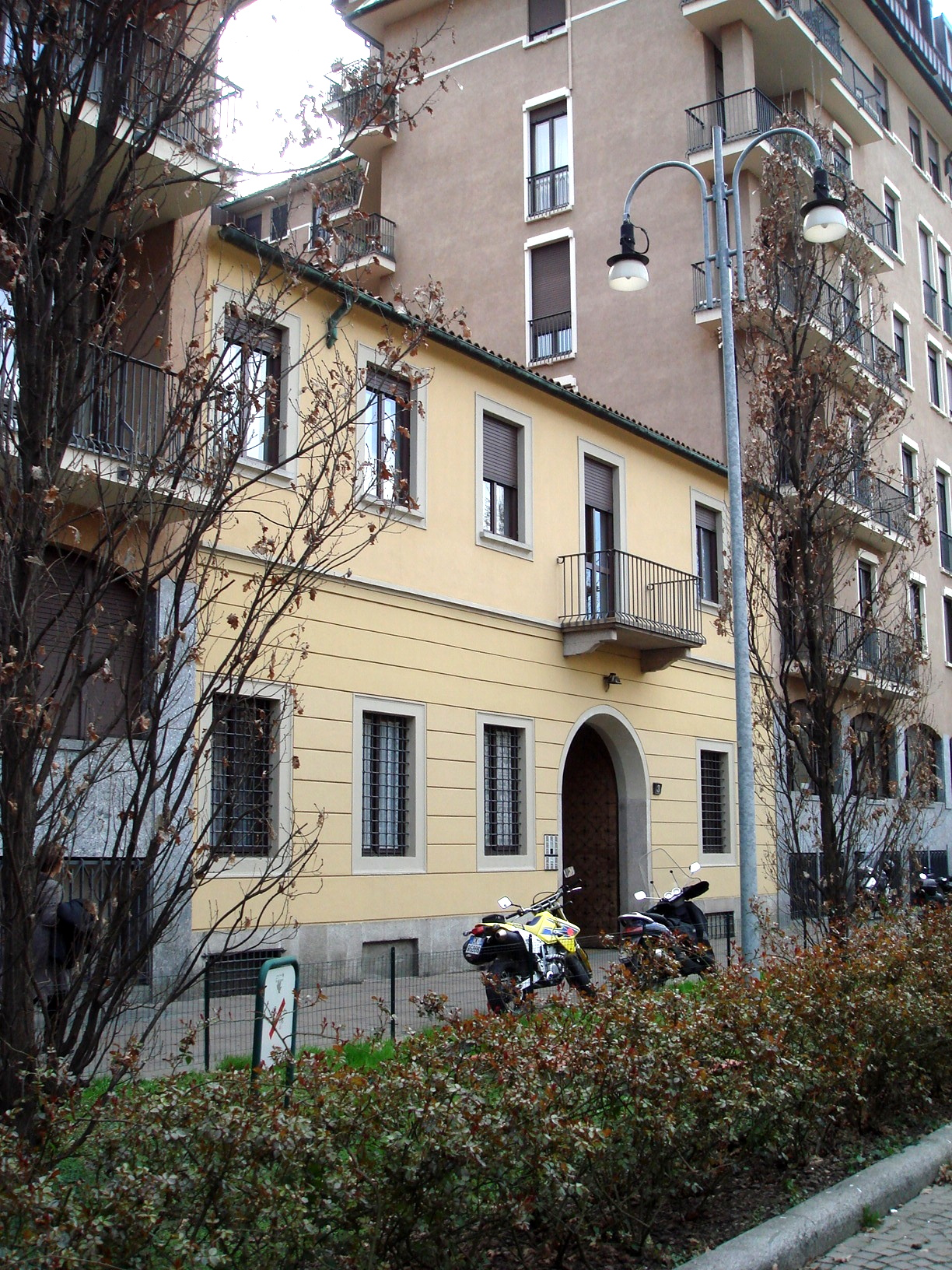
Facade.

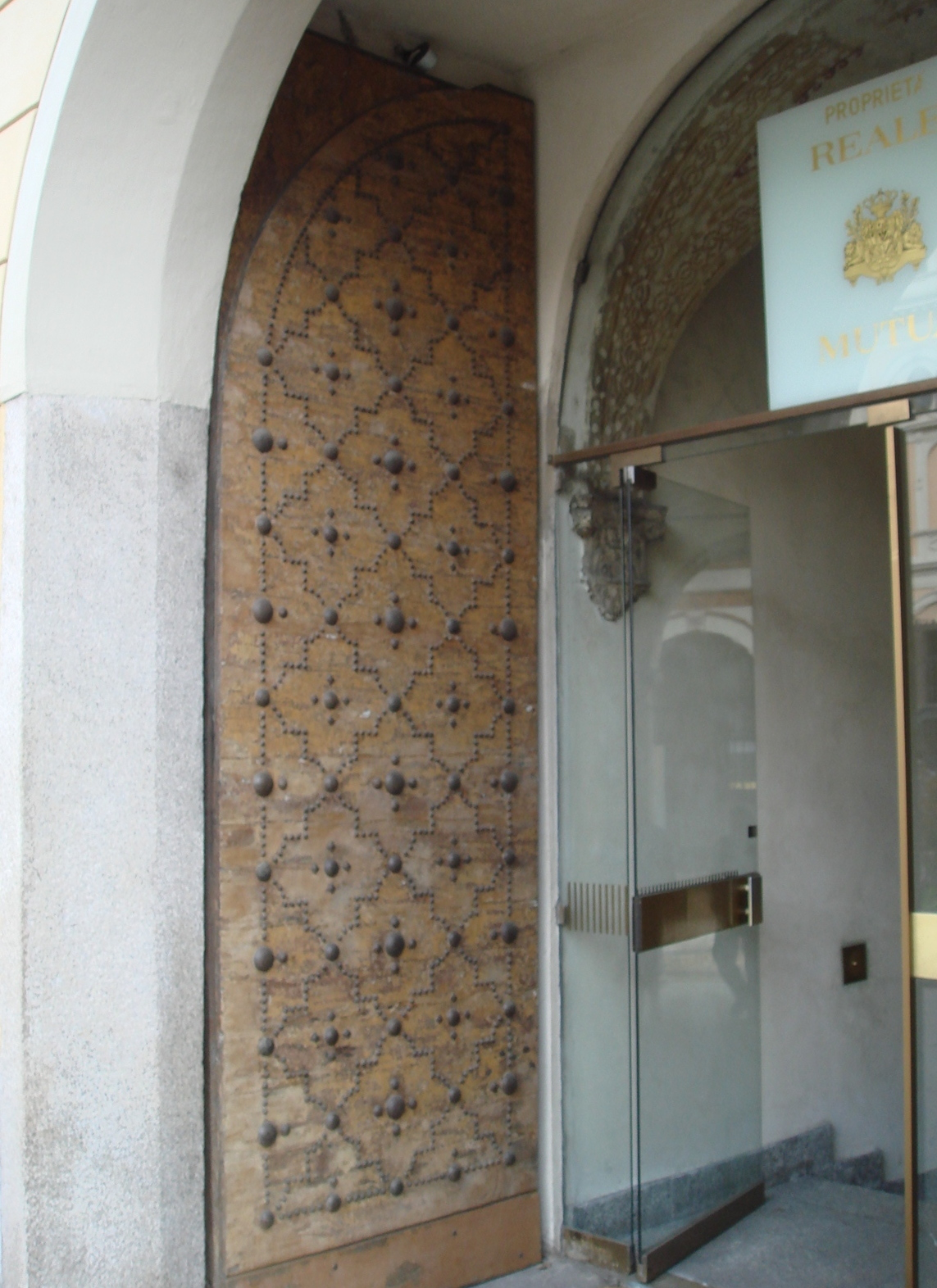
Door.

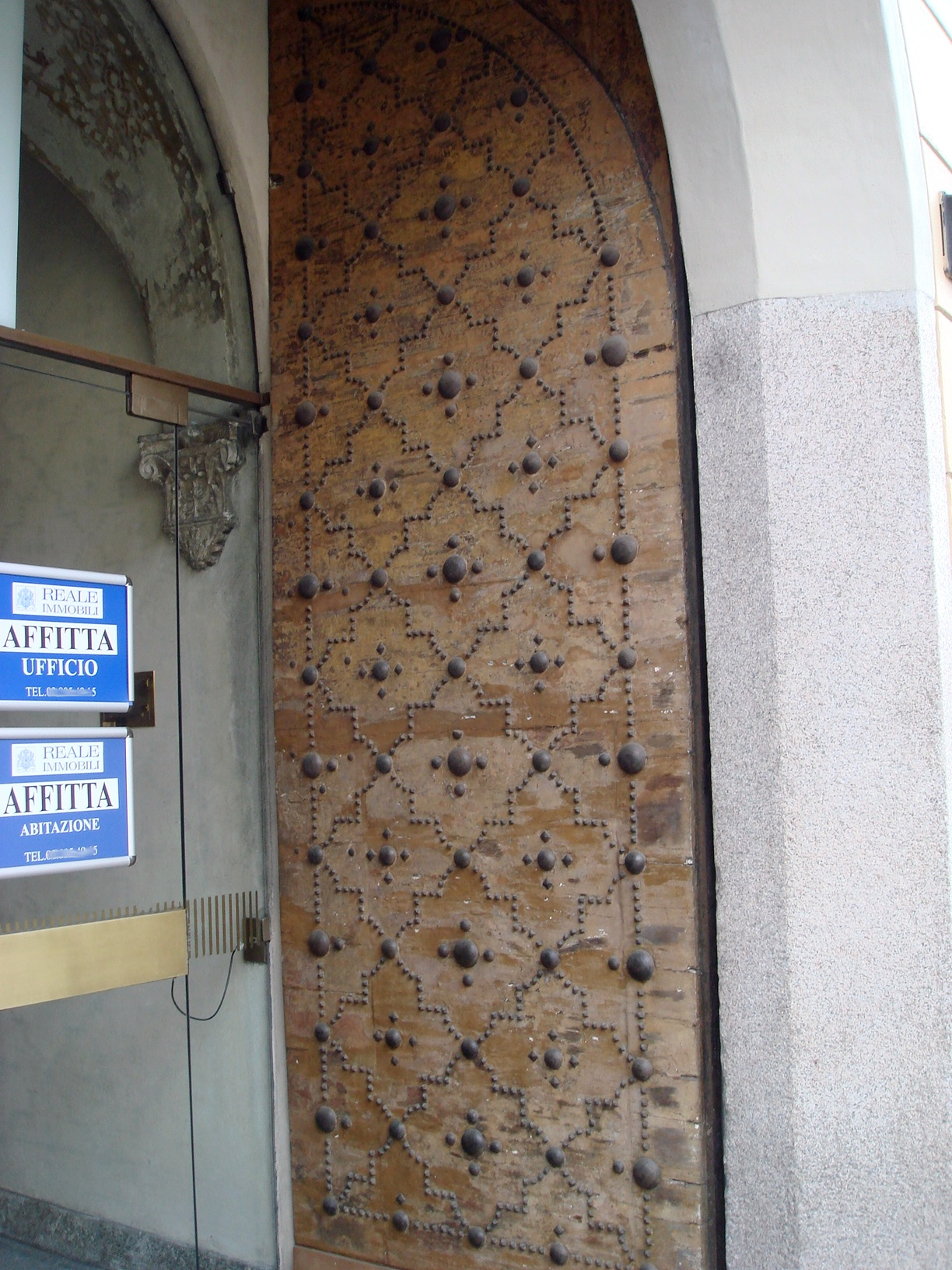
Door.

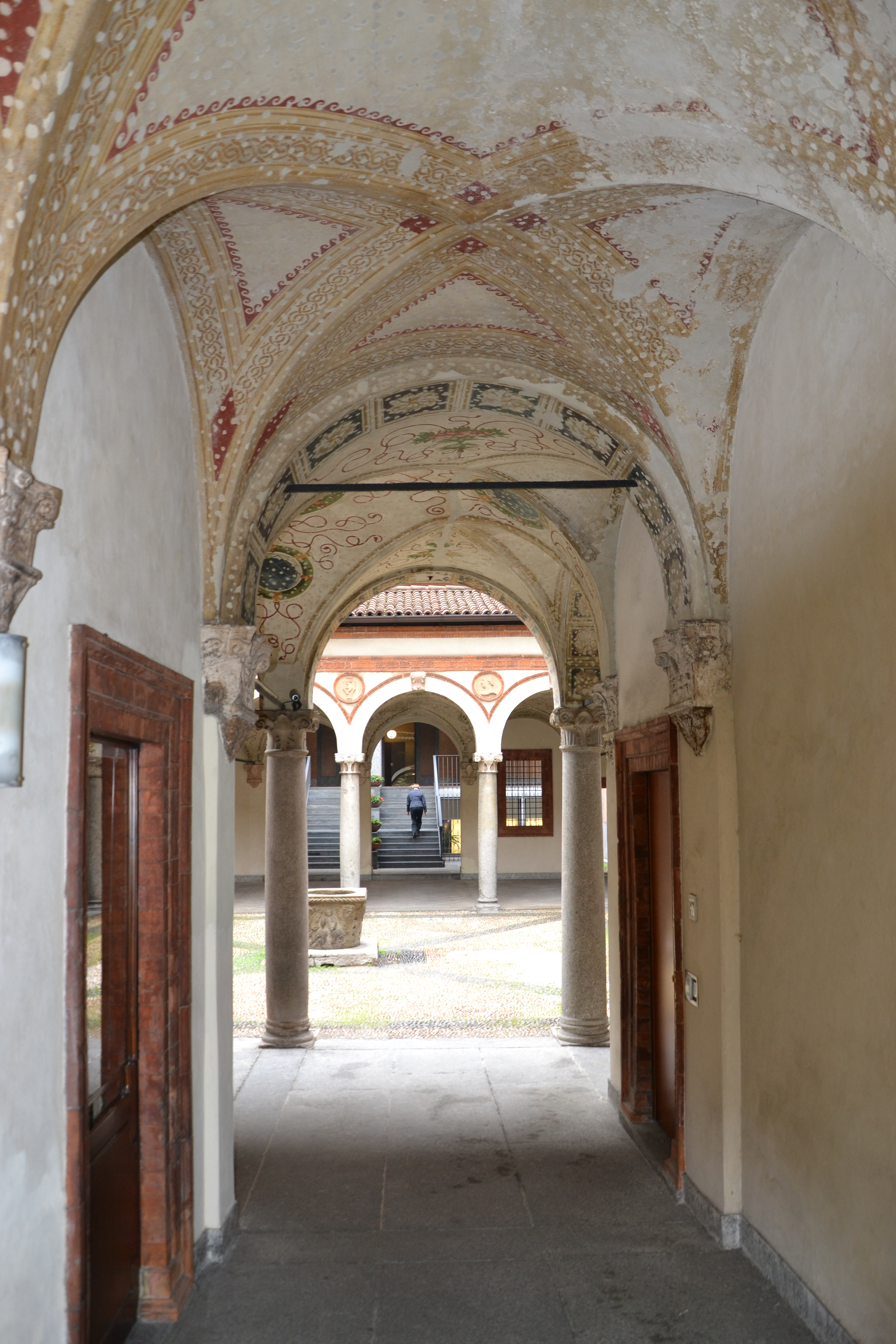
Entrance hall

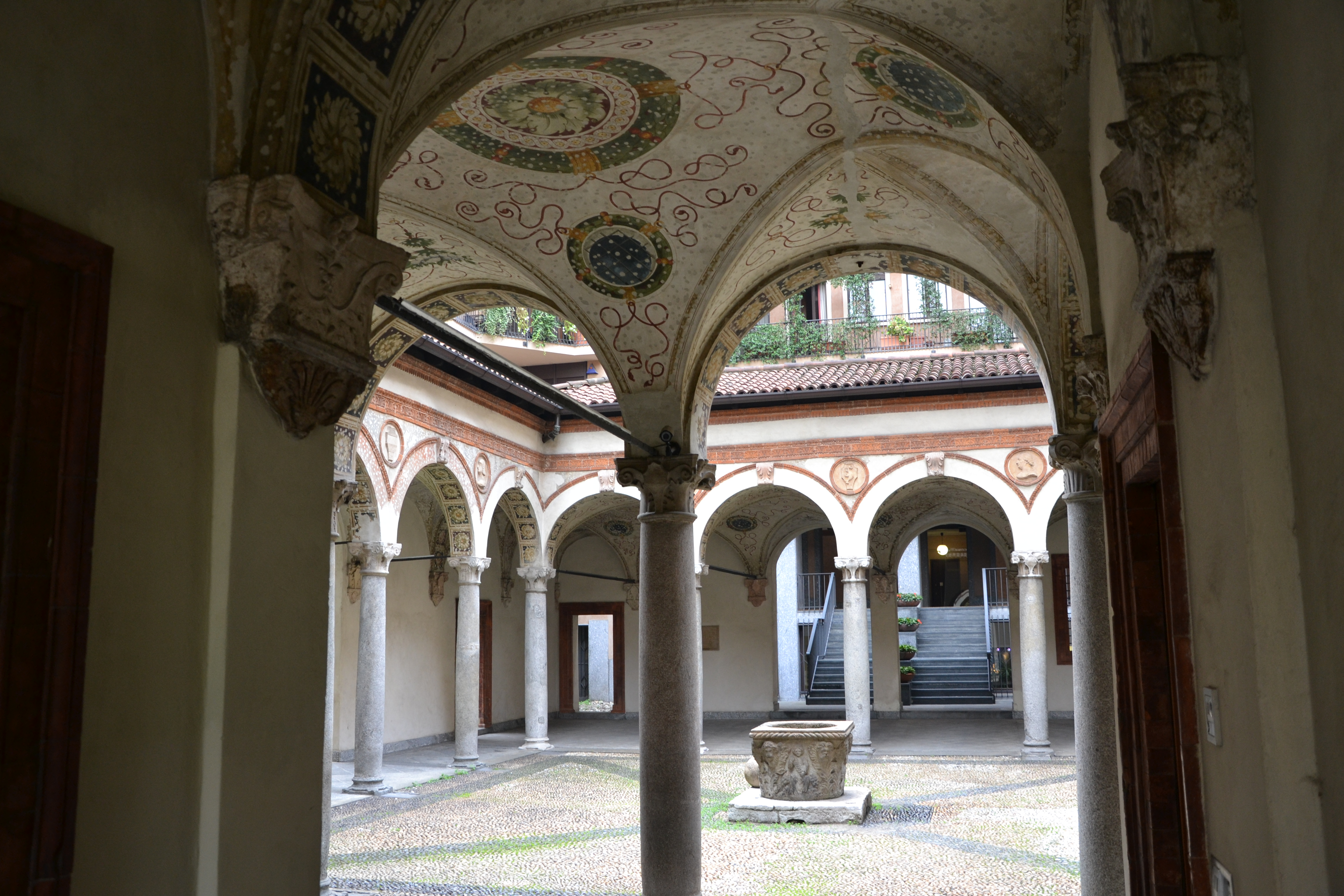
The frescoed vaults

=== Cloister / Cloister ===
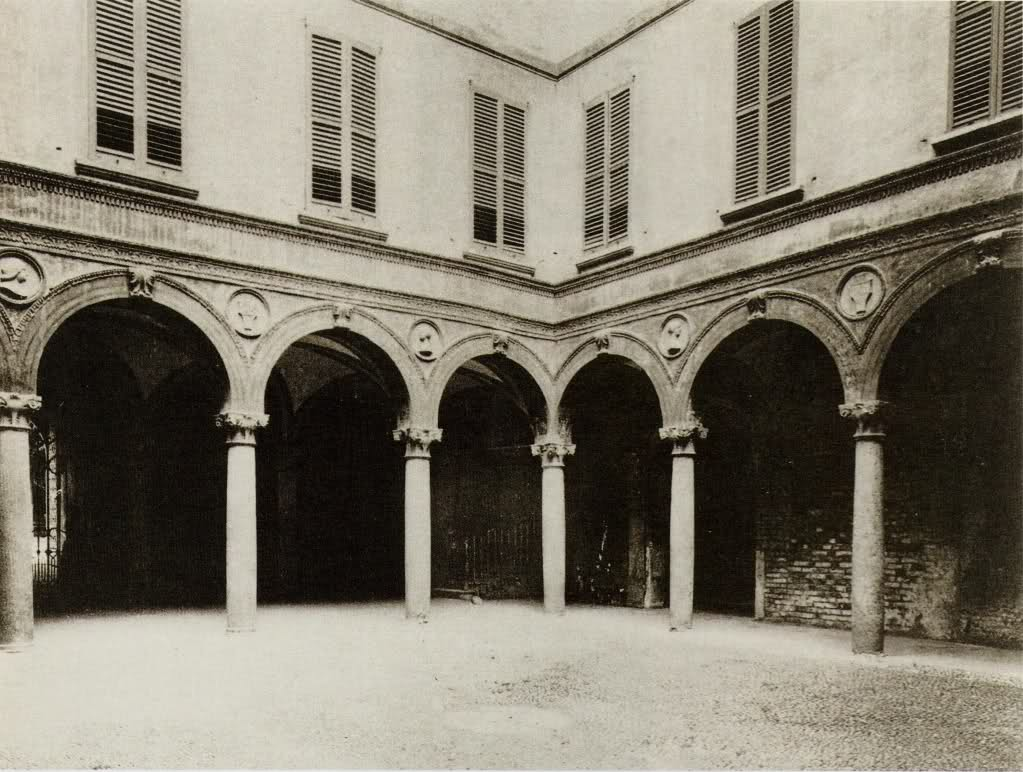
pre-war photography

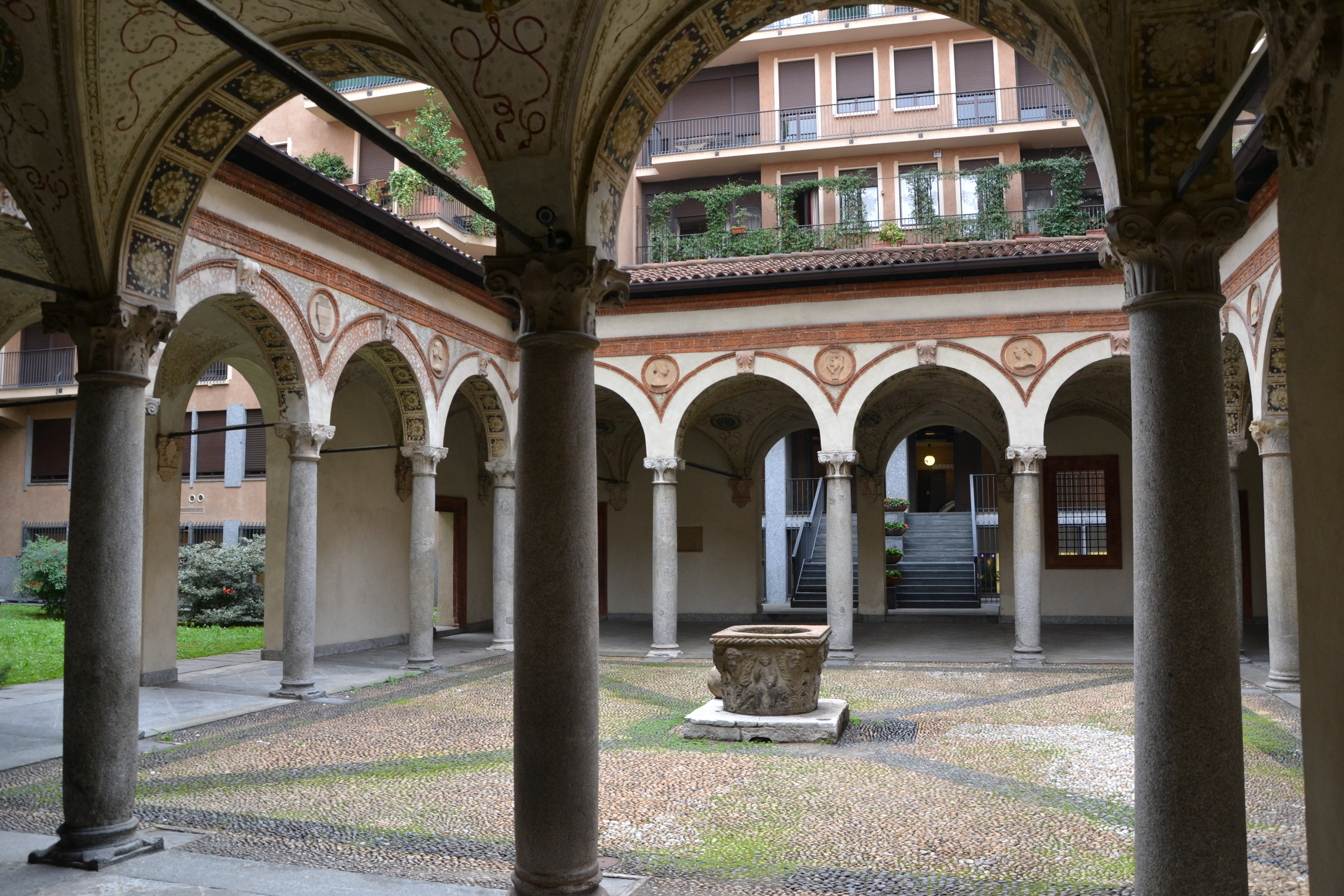
view of the court

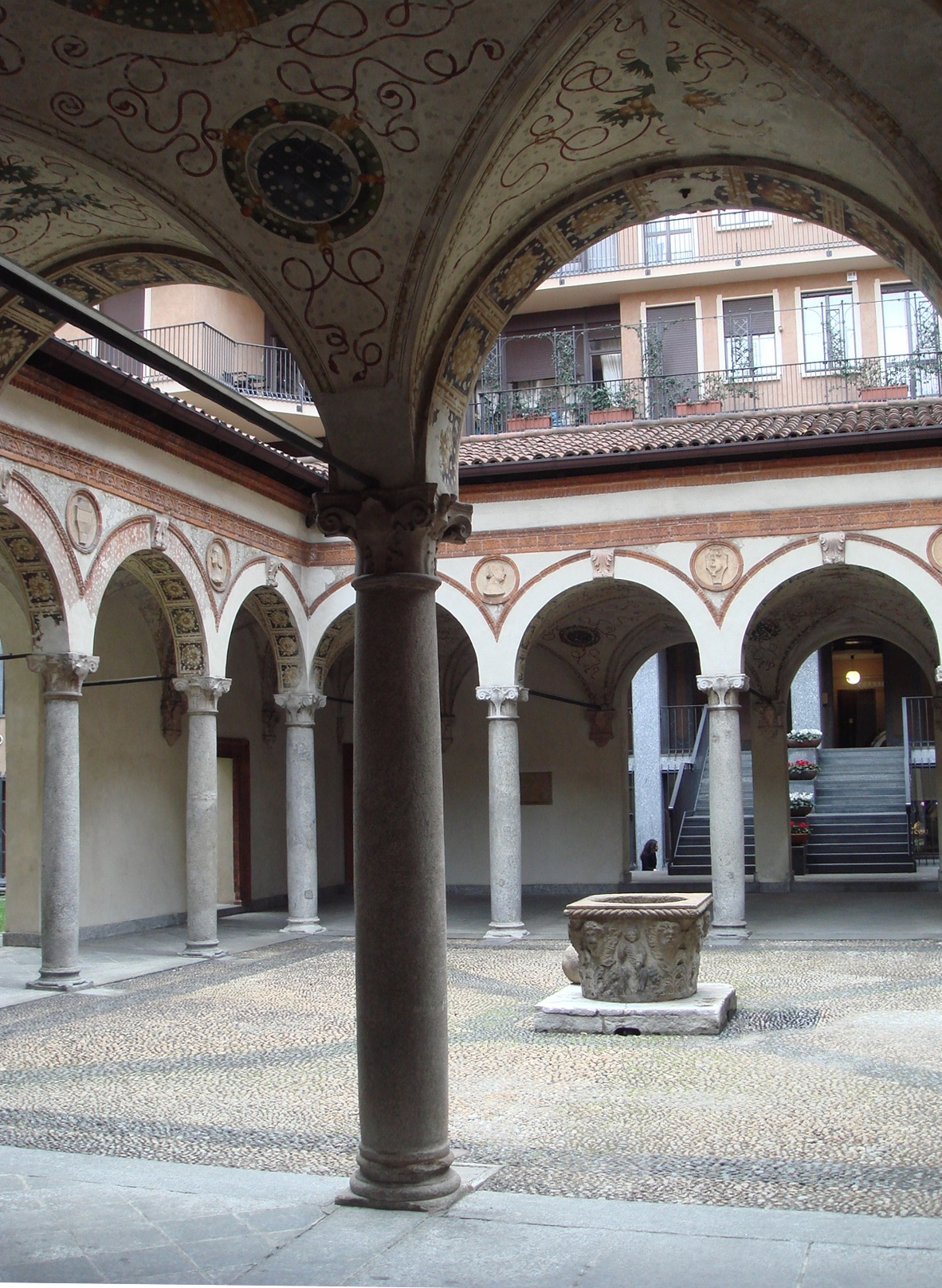

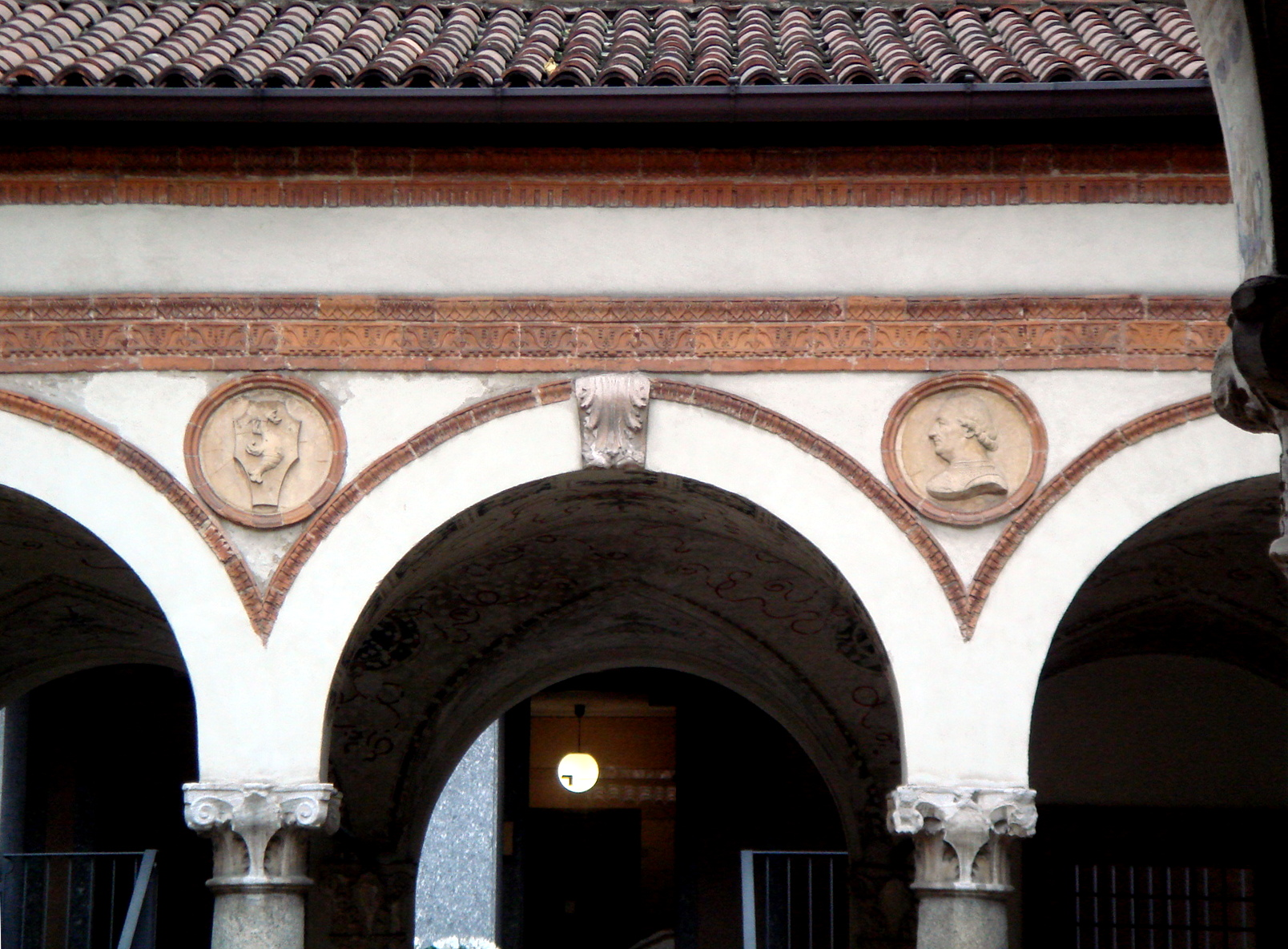

== See also ==
- Palazzo di Prospero Visconti

== Bibliography ==
=== Italian sources ===
- Guida d'Italia, Milano, Edizioni Touring Club Italiano, Milano 2005.
- M. C. Passoni, J. Stoppa, Il tardogotico e il rinascimento, in "Itinerari di Milano e provincia", Provincia di Milano, MIlano, 2000
- Dal Verme Luigi, in Dizionario Biografico degli Italiani - Volume 32 (1986), Treccani
