= Peace of Cremona (1441) =

1441 peace treaty between Venice and Milan

The Peace of Cremona was concluded on 20 November 1441 between the Republic of Venice and the Duchy of Milan, ending the fourth of the five campaigns in the long conflict between the two powers over mastery in northern Italy.

Through the mediation of Francesco Sforza, an armistice was concluded on 6 August, and negotiations began in late September at the field of Cavriana near Cremona, chosen as neutral ground. Sforza secured for himself the lordship of Cremona and the hand of Bianca Maria Visconti, the daughter of the Duke of Milan, Filippo Maria Visconti—and thus, since the Duke had no other heir, his own ultimate succession to the ducal throne.

By the terms of the treaty, Venice was able to keep the Adda River as the boundary between its mainland possessions and the Duchy of Milan. Venice also gained Riva di Lago from Milan, as well as Lonato, Valeggio sul Mincio, Asola, and Peschiera del Garda from the Marquis of Mantua, who also handed over the Venetian cities he had captured during the course of the war. Venetian possession of Ravenna was also recognized. Milan also returned Imola and Bologna to the Papal States, and restored independence to the Republic of Genoa.

== Sources ==
- Hazlitt, W. Carew (1900). The Venetian Republic: Its Rise, its Growth, and its Fall, 421–1797. Volume II, 1423–1797. London: Adam and Charles Black.
