= Ippolita Maria Sforza =

Italian noblewoman

- Duchess of Calabria
- Bust of Neapolitan princess traditionally identified as Ippolita Maria Sforza by Francesco Laurana
- Born: 18 April 1445; Jesi
- Died: 19 August 1488 (aged 43); Naples
- Spouse: Alfonso, Duke of Calabria (later Alfonso II of Naples)
- Issue: Ferdinand II of Naples; Isabella of Aragon; Piero, Prince of Rossano
- House: House of Sforza
- Father: Francesco I Sforza, Duke of Milan
- Mother: Bianca Maria Visconti

Ippolita Maria Sforza (Jesi, 18 April 1445 – Naples, 19 August 1488) was an Italian noblewoman, a member of the Sforza family which ruled the Duchy of Milan from 1450 until 1535. She was the first wife of the Duke of Calabria, who later reigned as King Alfonso II of Naples. Ippolita was described as very intelligent and cultured.

== Life ==
=== Childhood ===
Ippolita was born on 18 April 1445 in Jesi to Francesco Sforza and Bianca Maria Visconti, the only daughter and heir of Filippo Maria Visconti, Duke of Milan.

Agnese del Maino who also resided at the ducal court, was a prominent part of Ippolita and her siblings childhood and helped with overseeing the education of her grandchildren.

Since Ippolita was a child she showed precocity of intellect, a love for letters and a certain passion for hunting, which was encouraged by Ippolitas mother who also liked to hunt. Ippolitas father would also gift her greyhounds for use when hunting when visiting their country estates.

Francesco Sforza sometimes asked his young daughter to act as an intermediary between him and his mother, so that she could help him to return to the graces of Bianca Maria, during the times when he and his wife entered into a quarrel for some reason.

Ippolita's father, while having a good relationship with her mother, was not known to be faithful to his wife and fathered 15 illegitimate children during the marriage.

One of these, a daughter named Drusiana the daughter of Francescos long time mistress Giovanna d Acquapendente was in fact brought up alongside Ippolita.

She had four masters Guiniforte Barzizza, by Baldo Martorelli, humanist from the Marche region heir to the humanist pedagogy of Vittorino da Feltre, Doro Luftigo and Constantine Lascaris, who gave her the study of Greek and dedicated a Greek Grammarto her. When she was 14 years old she made a Latin address to pope Pius II at the diet of Mantua, which became well known after it was circulated in manuscript. Domenico Ghirlandaio allegedly painted a portrait of Ippolita.

Giovanni Sabatino degli Arienti describes it as follows:

Beautiful, fair, and blonde, she had lovely eyes and a slightly aquiline nose that lent her grace. She had beautiful teeth and a countenance of great majesty. Her height was on the tall side. Her hands were beautiful, like ivory in color, with long fingers. Her appearance was of great majesty, gentle, and graceful. She was fluent and eloquent in her speech. She read very well, with sweet tones and resonance, and had a decent understanding of Latin. [...] She had a gentle temperament. Her moments of ire and indignation and her reconciliations always proceeded with charity, pleasantness, and prudence, such that she was held in singular love, awe, and reverence by the people. Where reason and necessity called for it, she was friendly, most affable, and wise, such that the people said she was a kind mother to them. She had compassion for those unfortunate women who did not preserve their chaste reputation; she admonished them in a holy manner. When she sensed rancor or discord among her people, she would take it away, leading them back to goodwill and peace. She was a devoted woman; she often fasted on bread and water, prayed, contemplated [...] and lived a holy life, like a woman in a holy order [...] she was very charitable [...] she helped, as much as she could with her own resources, to provide dowries for maidens and secretly gave aid to the poor, without being asked, as if she herself had experienced the miseries of poverty [...] The saintly reputation of her illustrious deeds bore witness to the chaste virtue of her heart and the integrity of her mind. [...] She had an anguished abhorrence of vice, especially that of immodest women [...] She knew how to conduct herself with great modesty toward all kinds of people, except flatterers, slanderers, and tale-bearers, whom she avoided like a plague

— Giovanni Sabadino degli Arienti, Gynevera de le clare donne.

=== Marriage ===
On 10 October 1465 she married the Duke of Calabria Alfonso of Aragon, son of King Ferrante of Naples. The latter sent his second son Federico with six hundred horses to Milan to marry Ippolita by proxy in the name of his brother and to accompany her to his new home.

The bride had already left Milan with the wedding procession when the marriage was nearly called off due to the sudden death of the condottiero Jacopo Piccinino, son-in-law of Francesco Sforza. Ferrante of Aragon had previously enticed him to come to Naples with the false promise of a military command and then, out of revenge, had him imprisoned, as the condottiero had fought against him during the first baronial revolt. Jacopo Piccinino died shortly after his arrest—said by Ferrante to have fallen from a window following a failed escape attempt, but according to most, he was strangled in prison on the king’s orders. Francesco Sforza was so enraged at his death that he halted his daughter’s wedding procession and threatened to call off the marriage. In the end, the situation was resolved, and Ippolita, after spending two months in Siena and then passing through Rome, arrived in Naples on September 14, where she was received with great magnificence by her husband Alfonso and her father-in-law Ferrante, who organized many festivities and performances to celebrate the wedding.

In the early days, her relations with her husband—three years younger than her—must have been good, since that same year the fifteen-year-old Eleonor of Aragon, who was herself about to marry Ippolita's younger brother, Sforza Maria Sforza, wished for "some of the caresses [she] sometimes saw the Duke of Calabria give the Duchess", and Ippolita herself wrote to her mother that she and Alfonso slept together every night and often enjoyed themselves with hunts and amusements at their country estates. For example, she described her husband in these terms, in one of her many letters: "My most illustrious husband [...] with falcon and kite hunting, playing ball, reading and explaining to me his Spanish book on the governance of the state, and many other moral matters, has kept me and keeps me still in the greatest pleasure".

If that was the case, then relations between the spouses must have deteriorated over time, both due to Alfonso’s constant and brazen infidelities—he eventually found a new and compliant mistress in Trogia Gazzella—and because of his distinctive character. Indeed, just a few weeks after the wedding, there were already indications of Ippolita's first feelings of jealousy toward her husband: Alfonso was said by ladies and ambassadors to be a very handsome young man, "so charming that words could not describe him", but also "so restless that he couldn't stay still for half an hour".

Alfonso, however, also showed jealousy toward his wife: in the summer of 1466, he insisted that Ippolita stop playing with Giovanna da Correggio, wife of Roberto Sanseverino, when Giovanna came to visit her accompanied by her relative Gian Francesco.

Several letters from December 1466 onwards, both from ambassadors and from the lady herself, report an episode of jealousy on the part of Ippolita, when she was pregnant with her firstborn son. She had instructed one of her servants, a certain Donato, to follow her husband wherever he went. Alfonso, realizing he was being tailed, reacted with a very forceful gesture toward Donato, the exact nature of which is unknown (ambassador Pietro Landriani speaks of a beating), but it must have been quite serious, as Ippolita was deeply distressed by it. She wrote to her mother: "This matter with Donato I will never forget [...] not just a wound to my heart—I believe it split it in two, so great was and will remain my pain."

King Ferrante downplayed the incident to her Milanese relatives, saying that "these wars of the day arrive at peace by evening", but the situation did not improve, not even with the announcement of the duchess’s first pregnancy.

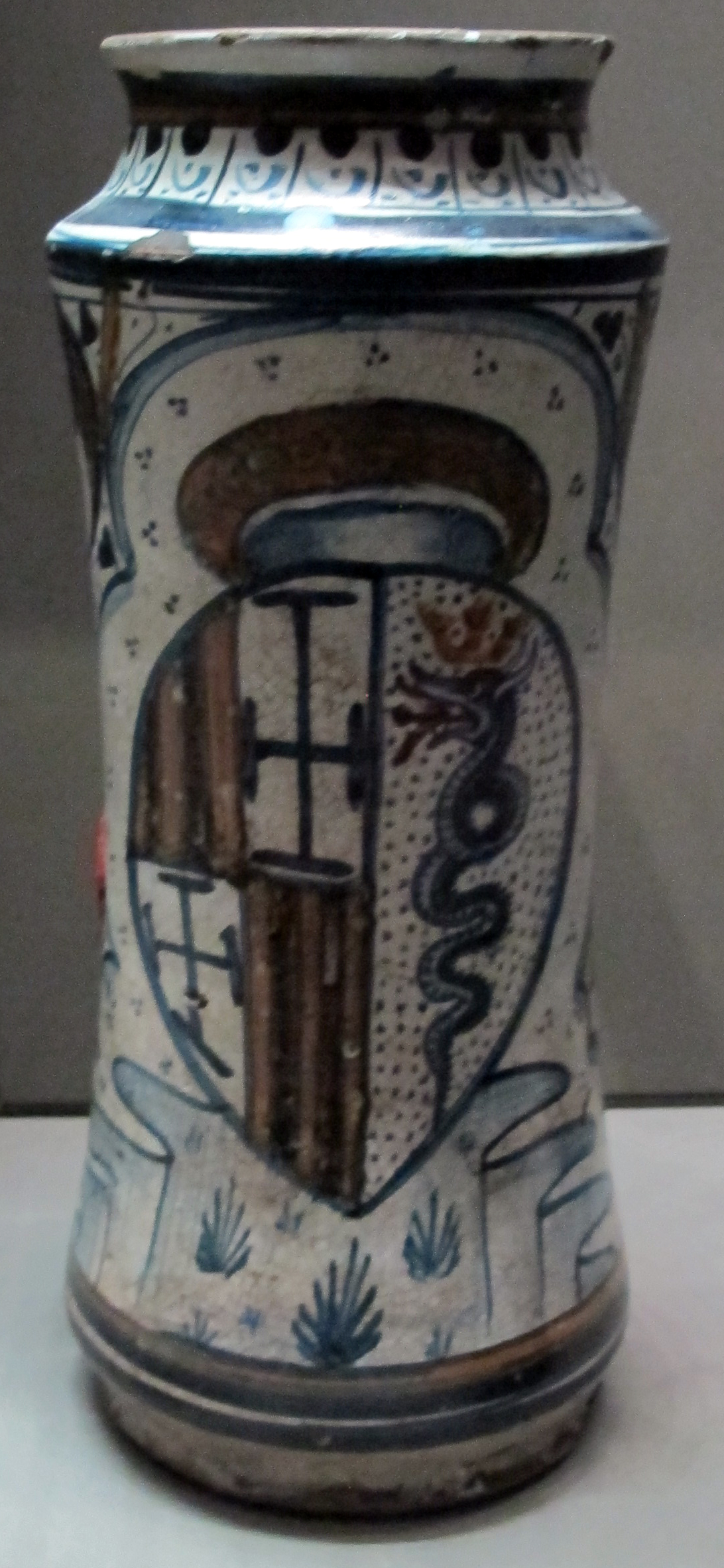
Neapolitan albarello with arms of Alfonso II of Naples and Ippolita.

Alfonso's violent reaction should not come as a surprise: after all, he was deeply hated by the Neapolitan people for having offended his subjects with "the cruelest insults and abuses", for committing the most heinous crimes—such as "violating virgins, taking other men's wives for his own pleasure", and for engaging in the "detestable and abominable vice of sodomy." In other words, he was simply beginning to reveal to his wife his true character. Nevertheless, Ippolita remained unfailingly faithful to him as a wife; indeed, she "distinguished herself by her great fidelity to her fearsome husband and by her extraordinary modesty". For his part, King Ferrante was extremely pleased with his daughter-in-law for her beauty, intelligence, and virtue—so much so that Sforza's ambassadors wrote that "His Majesty the King has no other pleasure, nor any other paradise does he seem to find, except when he sees her dancing and singing." In her letters to her mother, Ippolita reveals a certain discomfort at her father-in-law’s excessive displays of affection.

She also formed an excellent friendship with her brother-in-law Federico, who, like her, was a lover of literature and a man with a very sensitive soul. He would often visit her at Castel Capuano or at her villa known as the Duchesca, spending time in her company.

Throughout her life, Ippolita found herself playing the role of peacemaker between Milan and Naples and between Naples and Florence, since relations between the various powers were tense and Ferrante was partly responsible for the infamous Pazzi conspiracy. Indeed, when Lorenzo de’ Medici—not without a certain amount of fear—went to Naples in 1480 to try to negotiate peace with Ferrante, he did not leave Florence until Ippolita had reassured him that Ferrante would not imprison and kill him, as Ferrante had been known to do with his guests.

As early as 1468, Ippolita had returned to the court of Milan to try to reconcile her brother Galeazzo Maria—now duke after their father’s death—with their mother Bianca Maria and also with her father-in-law Ferrante. However, the visit proved to be very brief, as Ippolita, then in the full bloom of her womanly beauty, was forced to return quickly to Naples apparently to escape her brother’s advances, as he demonstrated highly ambiguous feelings toward her.

As a mother she was very fond of her children, and this is demonstrated by the tender letter she wrote to her mother to announce the birth of the firstborn Ferrandino, in which she hopes that her little son, growing up, will show her the same affection that she still showed to her mother. In addition to the three children she had with Alfonso, Ippolita also raised like her own her young niece and nephew, Beatrice and Ferrante d'Este, children of her sister-in-law Eleonora of Aragon, who had left them at the court of Naples while they were still young, at the request of her father Ferrante.

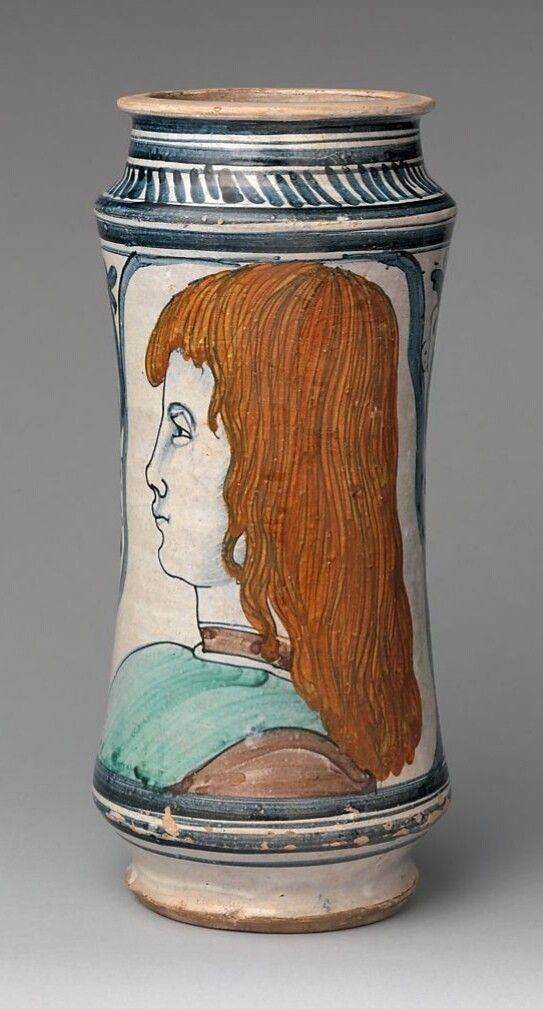
Neapolitan albarello with probable childhood portrait of Ferrandino, eldest son of Ippolita.

=== Death ===
Ippolita died suddenly on 19 August 1488 in Castel Capuano, shortly before the wedding of her daughter Isabella, according to Arienti due to an "apostema in the head". (pustulent swelling in the head)

Her death was said to have been prophesied by the friar Francis of Aragon, who was in the city of Florence: from there the friar wrote to the duchess, who had asked him to pray for her mother's soul, that he had had a vision in which the late Bianca Maria Visconti told him she had begged God to let her daughter come to heaven with her, adding that the bread was now baked and that the Almighty was eager to taste it at His banquet. Two or three days after receiving the letter, Ippolita fell seriously ill and sixteen days later died, despite all the processions and relics brought to her bedside—such as the blood of St. Januarius, the crucifix that spoke to St. Thomas Aquinas, and the head of St. Luke the Evangelist.

Her family members were always close to her, including the king and queen, and so also the eldest son Ferrandino who, initially very far from home, as soon as he received news of his mother's illness immediately returned to comfort her, being the favorite child of Ippolita. The second son Peter was also sick in bed and on the verge of death, and for this reason the departure of his mother was kept secret from him, so as not to cause him a displeasure that could have killed him.

Great funeral preparations were made and the deceased, dressed in white brocade, with a golden circle on her head and jewels and rings on her fingers, was buried in the church of the Annunziata in Naples.

She composed many letters. These have been published in Italy in a single volume entitled, The Letters of Ippolita Maria Sforza, and edited by Serena Castaldo. Previously, in 1893, in Bologna, F. Gabotto published a collection of Ippolita's letters which she had written in Naples from 1475 to 1482.

Apart from epistolary activity, her notable writings include poetry and a Latin eulogy for her father Francesco.

== Religious fervor ==
At her death, Ippolita was regarded almost as a saint due to the profoundly religious life she had led: every day she attended three Masses, sometimes even four or five, never less than two. She recited the rosary daily and read from a prayer book as large as a psalter and another as large as a vesperal, kneeling before the image of the Virgin. She would also recite the seven penitential psalms and offer prayers for the souls of her parents and deceased relatives, maintaining this practice for more than twenty years.

On every eve of the Feast of the Immaculate Conception, she would recite a thousand Hail Marys to honor the Virgin, to whom she always directed her thoughts, and very often she wept thinking of her sufferings. Every Saturday she recited the rosary three times with great devotion, having been the one to bring this devotion from Lombardy to Naples; on the eve of the Immaculate Conception, she would recite it six times. On Friday mornings, she would enter the chapel before Mass and, once alone, would close the door and pray prostrate on the floor with her arms outstretched in the form of a cross to commemorate Christ’s Passion, reciting one hundred Our Fathers and one hundred Hail Marys. Then she opened the doors and let in the chaplains who were to celebrate Mass. She also wished to hear the Vespers prayers every day.

Her soul was not satisfied by her own prayers alone. She also had others pray. When the House of Aragon was in a state of grave calamity, there was continuous praying in her home: her ladies took turns in pairs, in strict order, kneeling before the crucifix, relieving one another in shifts, often continuing day and night in this manner. At her command, the candles before the images of Christ and the Virgin had to remain lit until the requested grace had been granted.

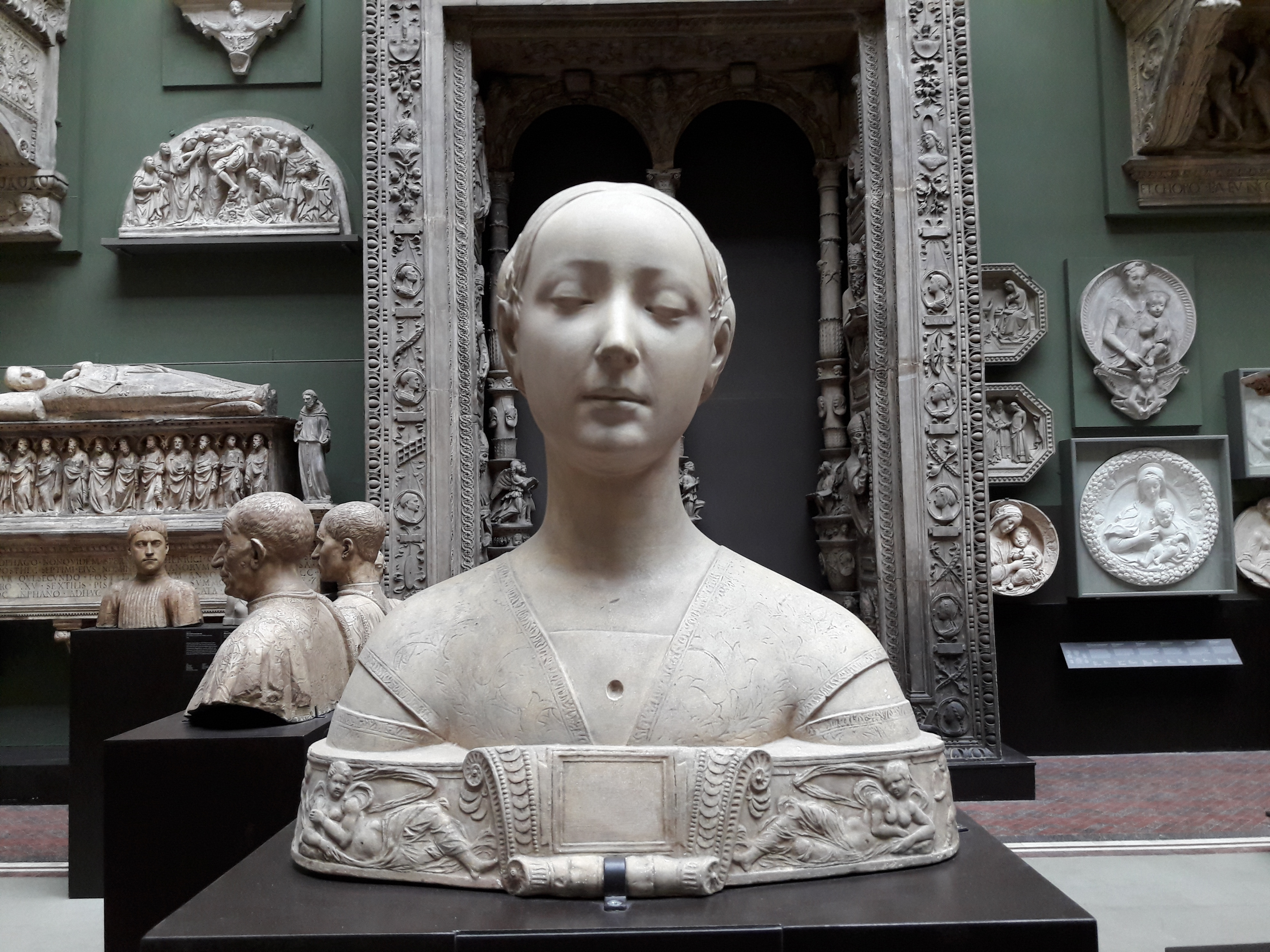
Alleged bust of Ippolita: plaster cast in the Victoria and Albert Museum in London, made around 1899 from an original preserved in Berlin and destroyed during the Second World War.

While her husband risked his life in Otranto, fighting for the liberation of the city from the Turks, Ippolita spent her nights kneeling in prayer before the altar; once, she stayed there nine consecutive hours, other times six or seven, depending on the need she felt at that moment, and her knees ached to the bone. When her loved ones were ill, in addition to countless prayers, she would also organize processions and pilgrimages, always obtaining the grace she sought. On one occasion, her firstborn Ferrandino was on the brink of death, with no hope of recovery, so Ippolita—followed by a multitude of naked children, up to a thousand, and by numerous praying maidens—walked the streets of Naples barefoot for several days, urging the people to pray for her son. Then, still barefoot, she made her way to Sorrento across a rugged mountain, traveling more than thirty miles, and at last, Ferrandino was healed. After this journey, her feet had to be treated for several days because of the sores caused by the long walk.

As soon as a vow was fulfilled, she immediately wanted to carry out her promises: she would fast, feed the poor, or have masses celebrated, then she would renew her commitment to prayer for the souls of her parents.

These doings are all recounted to us by Fra' Bernardino da Rende, who often celebrated masses for her, while Giovanni Sabadino degli Arienti goes further, even telling of miraculous events: it happened one day that her son Ferrandino, then about twenty years old, "due to the greatness and boldness of his spirit, while taming a strong horse, had it fall on top of him, such that he was carried away, believed to be dead". The young prince then remained in a coma for thirteen days, until his mother Ippolita, weeping and devoutly invoking the aid of the Virgin with countless prayers, obtained that "the lost, or perhaps departed, spirits returned to the lifeless body of her son."

In similar ways she had also obtained the healing of her other two children, Isabella and Pietro, also reduced to a serious condition, as well as her husband Alfonso and father-in-law Ferrante.

As for almsgiving, every day she gave meat, bread, and wine to more than thirty poor people, and increased these offerings to a further nineteen on the eve of the Immaculate Conception and on all the feast days of her Patroness. Once a month, she would visit all the prisoners to console them, and out of compassion she would send the court physicians to treat poor sick people. She made numerous donations to monasteries and provided dowries for young poor girls who were too ashamed to beg. She wished all these acts of charity to be carried out as secretly as possible, so that honor in this life would not deprive her of that in the next; nevertheless, they became known after her death through those who had been close to her. She never wanted to be thanked for what she did, nor could she bear to be praised.

She had a particular devotion to the Observant orders, for which reason she wore around her undergarment the cord of a Franciscan friar. She fasted during the four Ember weeks and their vigils, and with great sacrifice throughout the entire Lent, as well as dutifully every Saturday. Every evening she anointed the foreheads of her children with holy oil, drawing the sign of the cross, and blessed them with love before sending them to bed, then repeated the same operation in the morning.

Even during the illness that led her to the grave, Ippolita did not become agitated or distressed, but remained steadfast in her virtue. On her last day of life, sensing that she was about to die, she asked to hear a Mass of the Angels, so that she might go accompanied by them. Her relatives were surprised by this request, as the duchess was not accustomed to asking for that particular mass, and they asked if she would not prefer a Mass of the Annunciation instead, but Ippolita remained firm in her initial request. All of this took place on a Tuesday, the day dedicated to the angels, which that year also coincided with the Feast of the Annunciation, to which the Duchess was deeply devoted.

== Lineage ==
The marriage with Alfonso produced three children:

- Ferdinand II of Naples known as "Ferrandino" (26 June 1467 – 7 October 1496), King of Naples from 1495 to 1496;
- Isabella (2 October 1470 – 11 February 1524), Duchess of Milan by marriage to her cousin Gian Galeazzo Sforza and later Duchess of Bari. She was the mother of Bona Sforza of Aragon, wife of Sigismund I of Poland;
- Pietro (31 March 1472 – 17 February 1491), Prince of Rossano.

== In mass culture ==
=== Literature ===
The Trattato della laudanda vita e della profetata morte di Ippolita Sforza d'Aragona by Bernardino da Rende is dedicated to her.

=== Television ===
- In the Netflix series Medici Ippolita is played by the French actress Gaia Weiss.
- In the historical fantasy drama series Da Vinci's Demons Ippolita is played by Jeany Spark.

In both these television series, the character of Ippolita is completely distorted: towards Lorenzo de’ Medici, with whom she maintained a correspondence, she never felt anything more than sincere friendship, a friendship that was never love. Nor would Ippolita, a woman renowned for her exceptional chasteness, ever have given herself to him, thus betraying her husband; nor would King Ferrante, who was infatuated with his daughter-in-law, ever have exploited her by pushing her to prostitute herself to the Medici lord.

== Sources ==
- Zaglia, Marcello (1890). Vittorino da feltre. Vol. PRIMO. VITA E SISTEMA EDUCATIVO DEI PIU ILLUSTRI PEDAGOGISTI ITALIANI. Link
- Bernuzzi, Marco (2003). "Alfonso II of Aragon". In Bietenholz, Peter G.; Deutscher, Thomas Brian (eds.). Contemporaries of Erasmus: A Biographical Register of the Renaissance and Reformation. Vol. A–Z. University of Toronto Press.
- Commire, Anne; Klezmer, Deborah, eds. (2000). Women in World History. Vol. Harr–I. Yorkin Publications.
- Covini, Nadia (2006). Princesses and Ladies of Power at the Sforza Court.
- Hollings, Mary Albright (1911). Europe in renaissance and reformation, 1453–1659. Macmillan.
- Previté-Orton, C. W. (1978). The Shorter Cambridge Medieval History. Vol. 2, The Twelfth Century to the Renaissance (9th ed.). Cambridge University Press.
- Robin, Diana, ed. (2009). Francesco Filelfo: Odes. Harvard University Press.
- Stevenson, Jane (2005). Women Latin poets: language, gender, and authority, from antiquity to the Eighteenth Century. Oxford University Press.
- Tribble, Colin (2012). A Trusting Partnership: Sentiment and Politics in Quattrocento Dynastic Unions: Unpublished Dissertation. University of Edinburgh.
