= Scaramuccia da Forlì =

Italian condottiero

Scaramuccia da Forlì (died 1450) was an Italian condottiero active in the first half of the 15th century. In Italian his name means "skirmish". He was a native of Forlì, Romagna.

First reference to Scaramuccia was in 1433 as connestabile (commanding officer) of one of the gates of the city of Forlì in Emilia Romagna. He was a member of the party which was fighting against the Ordelaffi, and when they regained control of the city he was banished.

In 1438, during the war between the Republic of Venice and the Duchy of Milan, he intervened successfully to raise the siege of Brescia by Niccolò Piccinino, general to Filippo Maria Visconti, the Duke of Milan. Subsequently, he defended Brescia with 29 Bergamaschi soldiers.

In the following years Scaramuccia remained loyal to the Serenissima, and in the summer of 1446 he fought against the Visconti's army at the head of 400 infantry. His commander was the famous Micheletto Attendolo. He successfully relieved the city of Cremona, which was being besieged by Francesco Piccinino and Luigi dal Verme.

Scaramuccia died in 1450.

== Bibliography ==
- Page at condotttieridiventura.it
