= Agnese del Maino =

Milanese noblewoman (c. 1411–1465)

- Born: c.1411 Milan, Duchy of Milan
- Died: 13 December 1465 (aged 54)
- Known for: Mistress of Filippo Maria Visconti
- Children: Bianca Maria Visconti; Caterina Maria Visconti

Agnese del Maino (c. 1411 – 13 December 1465) was a Milanese noblewoman and the mistress of Filippo Maria Visconti, the last legitimate duke of Milan of the Visconti dynasty. Agnese was the mother of Duchess Bianca Maria Visconti.

== Family ==
Agnese was born around 1411 in Milan. She was the daughter of Ambrogio del Maino, a Count Palatine and ducal questore or chief of police. Her mother's name and identity is unknown. Agnese had two brothers, Lancillotto del Maino and Andreotto del Maino, who were both courtiers and members of the ducal council. She became the mistress of Filippo Maria Visconti, the last duke of Milan of the Visconti dynasty, whose wife Beatrice Lascaris di Tenda had been executed for adultery in 1418 and had produced no children.

== Birth of a daughter ==
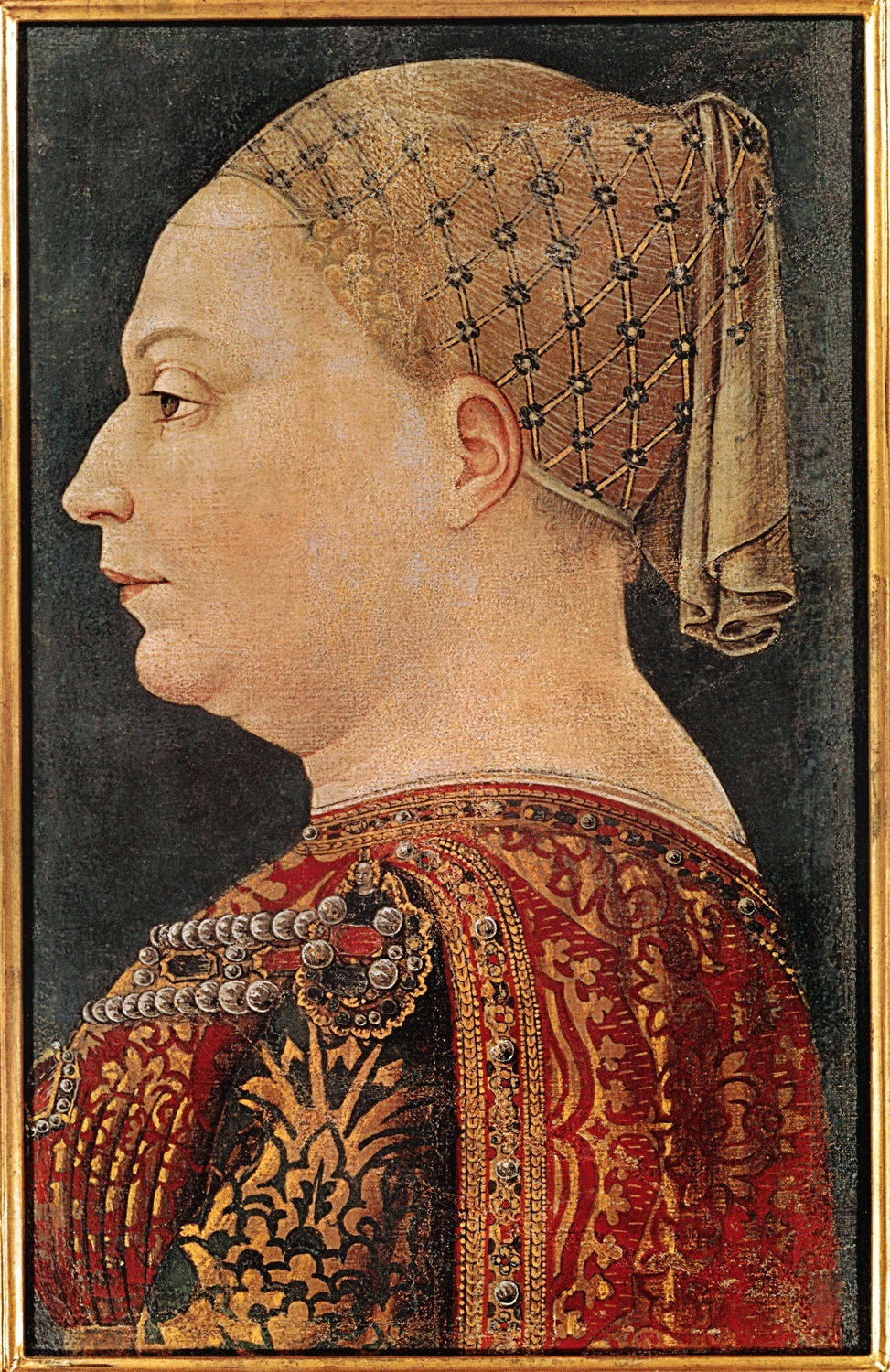
Portrait of Bianca Maria Visconti, Duchess of Milan, illegitimate daughter of Agnese del Maino by Filippo Maria Visconti

On 31 March 1425 at Settimo Pavese, at approximately age 14, Agnese gave birth to Filippo's daughter, whom they named Bianca Maria. When the baby was six months old, Agnese and Bianca Maria were sent to the castle of Abbiategrasso, where lavish apartments were provided for mother and child. In 1426, at approximately age 15, Agnese bore the Duke a second daughter, Caterina Maria, but the child died shortly after her birth. Filippo, for reasons of state, married secondly, by proxy on 2 December 1427, and in person on 24 September 1428, Marie of Savoy (January 1411 – 22 February 1479), the daughter of Amadeus VIII of Savoy and Marie of Burgundy. The duke's second marriage was also childless, making Bianca Maria his sole heir to the duchy of Milan.

On 25 October 1441, 16-year-old Bianca Maria was married at the Abbey of San Sigismondo in Cremona, to Francesco Sforza, a renowned Condottiero and member of the Condottieri Sforza family. Agnese was present at her daughter's wedding. The festivities, which lasted for days, offered a sumptuous banquet, a series of tournaments, a palio, painted carts featuring allegorical scenes, and a large cake that reproduced the Torrazzo, Cremona's most prominent tower. Bianca Maria's considerable dowry included the towns of Cremona and Pontremoli. The marriage produced eight children, among these were, Galeazzo Maria Sforza, Duke of Milan, Ludovico Sforza, Duke of Milan, Cardinal Ascanio Sforza, and Ippolita Maria Sforza, Duchess of Calabria.

== Death of Filippo Maria Visconti ==
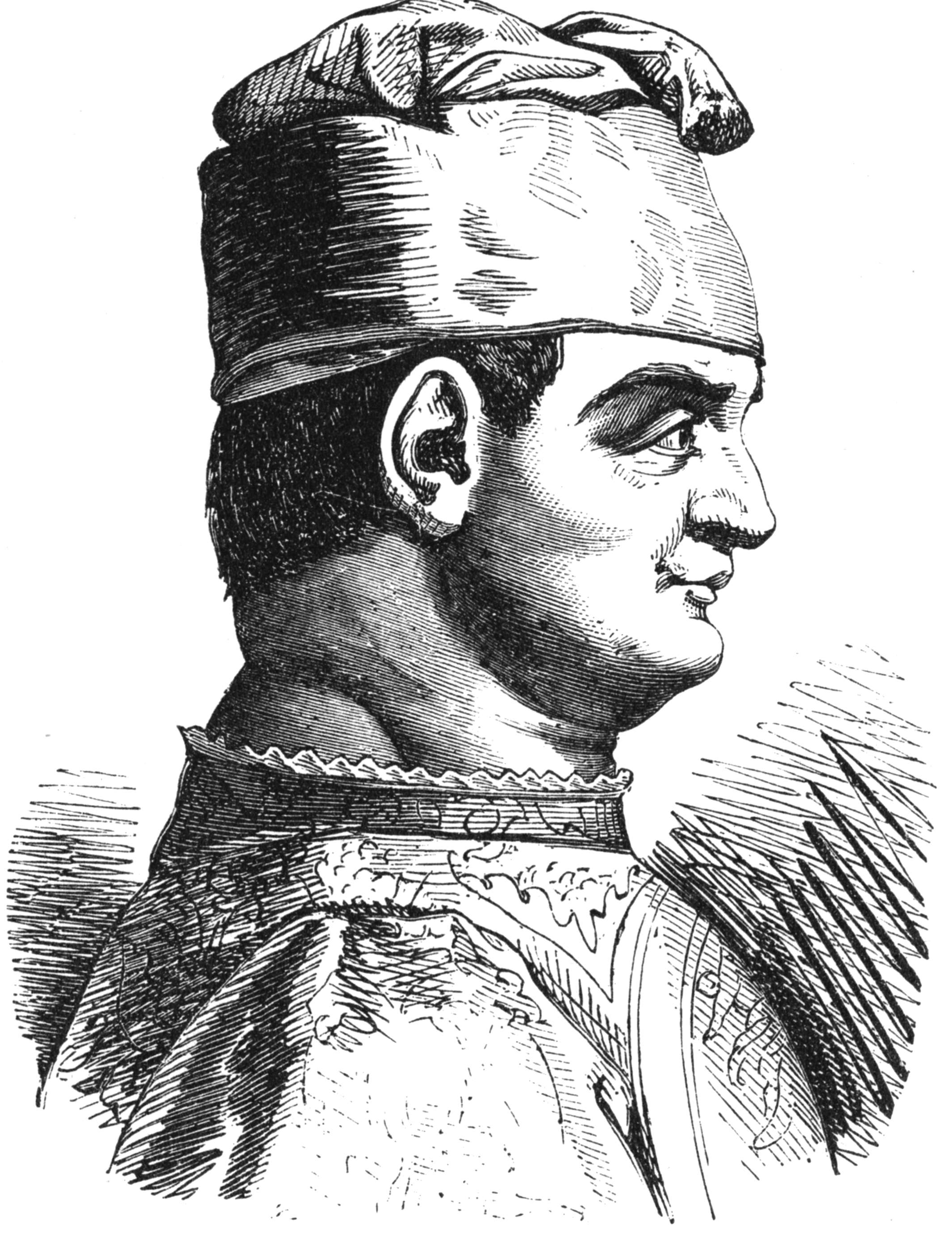
Filippo Maria Visconti, Agnese's lover

Filippo Maria Visconti died on 13 August 1447; he was not quite fifty-five years old. Bianca Maria was his only direct heir, albeit illegitimate. His death, without legitimate offspring, resulted in the creation of the short-lived Ambrosian Republic. That same year, Agnese convinced Matteo Da Bologna, the condottiero who held the city of Pavia, to restore the city to her son-in-law, Francesco Sforza who had inherited it upon the death of Filippo. Francesco subsequently took the title of Count of Pavia.

A revolt broke out in Milan on 24 February 1450, due to a famine in the city which resulted in rampant starvation and brought about much suffering to the populace. One month later on 25 March, after the disputed succession to the duchy was decided in their favour consequent to a meeting of nobles and leading citizens, Francesco Sforza and Bianca Maria made their triumphal entry into the city as the Duke and Duchess of Milan. The Ambrosian Republic had ended and was replaced by the Sforza dynasty which would rule Milan until 1535. Agnese resided with them at the ducal court, overseeing the education of her grandchildren. Extant diplomatic papers record that Agnese was a conspicuous participant in court functions, until her death on 13 December 1465 at the age of fifty-four years. Her daughter, Bianca Maria died three years later on 28 October 1468. Francesco had died in 1466, and his eldest son Galeazzo Maria succeeded him as Duke of Milan.

== Agnes del Maino in art and drama ==
There are two contemporary paintings of Agnese which survive to this day; the artists, however, remain unknown. Agnese is a character in the 1833 tragic opera Beatrice di Tenda by Sicilian composer Vincenzo Bellini. The role of Agnese was played by Anna del Serre when the opera was first performed at Teatro La Fenice in Venice on 16 March 1833.
