= Luigi dal Verme =

Italian condottiero

Luigi dal Verme (c. 1390 – 1449), also known as Alvise dal Verme, was an Italian condottiero.

Dal Verme was the son of the condottiero and Seigneur of Sanguinetto Jacopo dal Verme and a member of the Verona branch of the Dal Verme noble family, initially he followed the latter's campaigns, then fought in the company of Muzio Attendolo in the war against Joan II of Naples. Later he was hired by the Bolognesi and then by the Republic of Venice. He married Luchina Bussone, daughter of condottiero Carmagnola.

After fighting in the war between the Republic of Florence and Filippo Maria Visconti, Duke of Milan, the latter give him the title of count and several fiefs. In 1437 he returned to Lombardy and, together with Niccolò Piccinino, defended Bellinzona but was defeated at Orzinuovi and Soncino. In 1446, for Visconti, he besieged Cremona with Francesco Piccinino, but was pushed back by Scaramuccia da Forlì's Venetian troops.

Later he was commander-in-chief of the Estensi army. He was defeated at Monte Brianza by Attendolo. When in 1447 the Ambrosian Republic was proclaimed, he joined Francesco Sforza in its defence, contributing to the latter's conquest of Milan. Finished the war, dal Verme obtained by him the confirmation of his fief in Lombardy. Dal Verme built the Palazzo Dal Verme.

Dal Verme was wounded in the siege of Monza and died soon afterwards, most likely of plague.

== Issue ==
- Pietro Dal Verme,2nd count Sanguinetto, Married to Camilla del Maino, then married Chiara Sforza, illegitimate daughter of Galeazzo Maria Sforza, Duke of Milan
- Taddeo Dal Verme
- Antonia dal Verme, married Tristano Sforza, legitimized son of Francesco I Sforza, Duke of Milan

== See also ==
- Wars in Lombardy
