= Polissena Ruffo =

Polissena Ruffo (1400 Cariati - 17 July 1420) was a princess of Calabria. Princess of Rossano, countess of Corigliano and Montalto was the daughter of Carlo Ruffo di Montalto and Ceccarella Sanseverino.

She married Francesco Sforza (founder of the Sforza dynasty in Milan) in 1418 as his first wife. In 1420, they had a daughter, Antonia Polissena, but Polissena died in childbirth and the baby girl also died shortly after.
