= Francesco I Sforza =

Italian condottiero and Sforza dynasty founder (1401–1466)

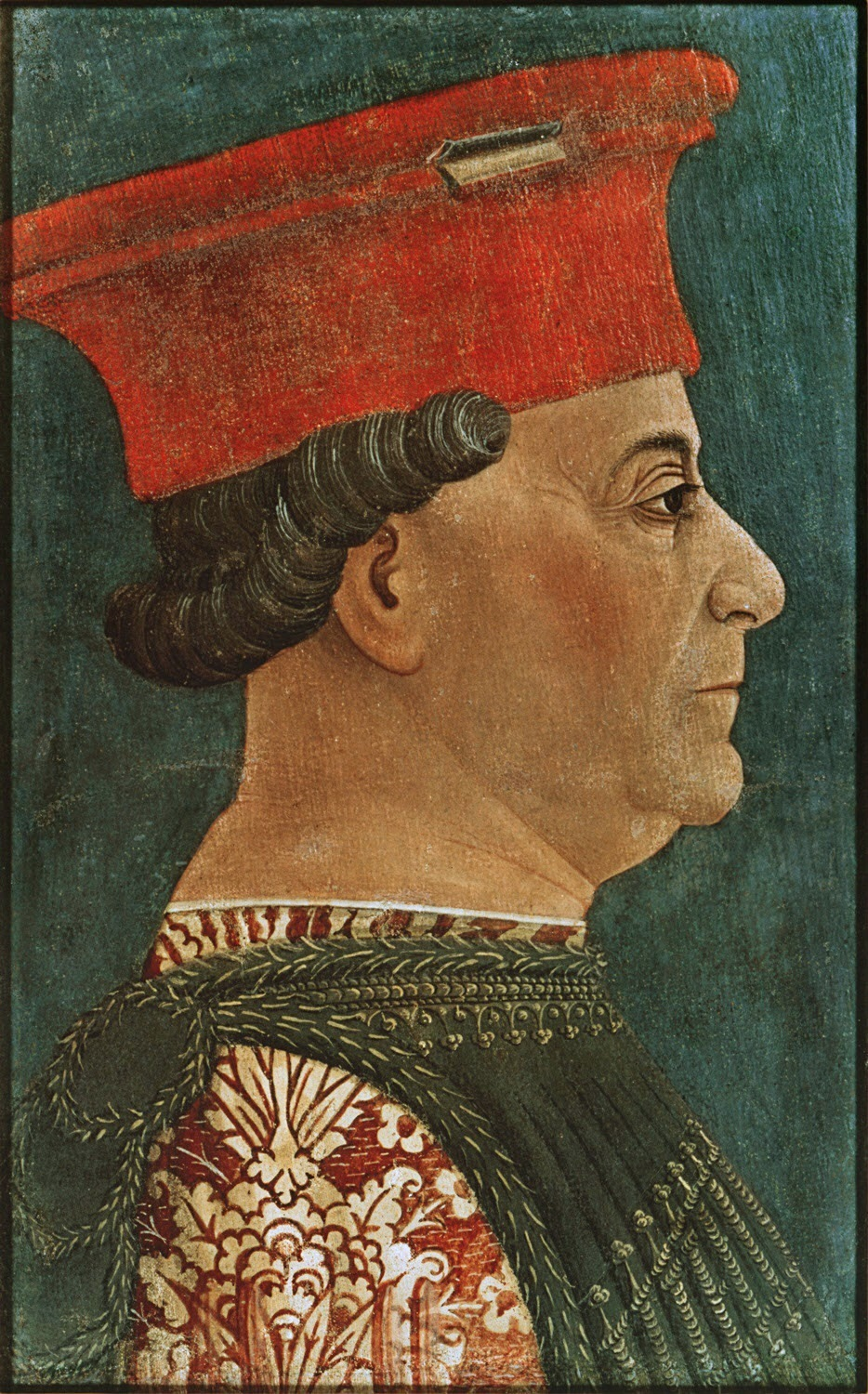
- Portrait of Francesco Sforza (c. 1460) by Bonifacio Bembo. Sforza insisted on being shown in his worn dirty old campaigning hat. Pinacoteca di Brera, Milan.

Duke of Milan
- Reign: 25 March 1450 – 8 March 1466
- Predecessor: Golden Ambrosian Republic
- Successor: Galeazzo Maria Sforza
- Born: 23 July 1401; Cigoli, San Miniato, Republic of Florence
- Died: 8 March 1466 (aged 64); Milan, Duchy of Milan
- Spouse: Polissena Ruffo (m. 1418; died 1420) Maria Caldora (m. 1424; ann. 1430) Bianca Maria Visconti (m. 1441)
- Issue among others: Galeazzo Maria Sforza, Duke of Milan; Ippolita Maria Sforza, Duchess of Calabria; Filippo Maria Sforza, Count of Corsica; Sforza Maria Sforza, Duke of Bari; Francesco Galeazzo Maria Sforza; Ludovico Sforza, Duke of Milan; Ascanio Maria Sforza; Elisabetta Maria Sforza, Marquise of Montferrato; Ottaviano Maria Sforza, Count of Lugano
- House: Sforza
- Father: Muzio Attendolo Sforza
- Mother: Lucia de Martini (Demartini)

Francesco I Sforza (Italian: [franˈtʃesko ˈpriːmo ˈsfɔrtsa]; 23 July 1401 – 8 March 1466) was an Italian condottiere who founded the Sforza dynasty in the duchy of Milan, ruling as its (fourth) duke from 1450 until his death. Renowned for his military skill and political acumen, he was among the few condottieri to successfully transform battlefield success into stable dynastic rule.

In the 1420s, he took part in the War of L'Aquila, and during the 1430s he served both the Papal States and the Duchy of Milan in their conflicts against Venice. Following the Peace of Cremona (1441), which he helped broker, Sforza married Bianca Maria Visconti, daughter of Duke Filippo Maria Visconti, thus strengthening his claim to Milan. After a brief military campaign in southern Italy with René of Anjou, he returned to Milan and seized control following the extinction of the Visconti line.

As duke, Sforza restored Milan's economic stability, improved the system of irrigation canals, and restructured the bureaucracy. He played a leading role in the establishment of the Treaty of Lodi (1454), which created a lasting balance of power among the Italian states and ushered in a period of relative peace.

He died in 1466 and was succeeded by his son, Galeazzo Maria Sforza. Although Francesco ruled with broad recognition, it was not until 1494 that his other son, Ludovico Sforza, received formal investiture as Duke of Milan by Emperor Maximilian I.

== Biography ==
=== Early life ===
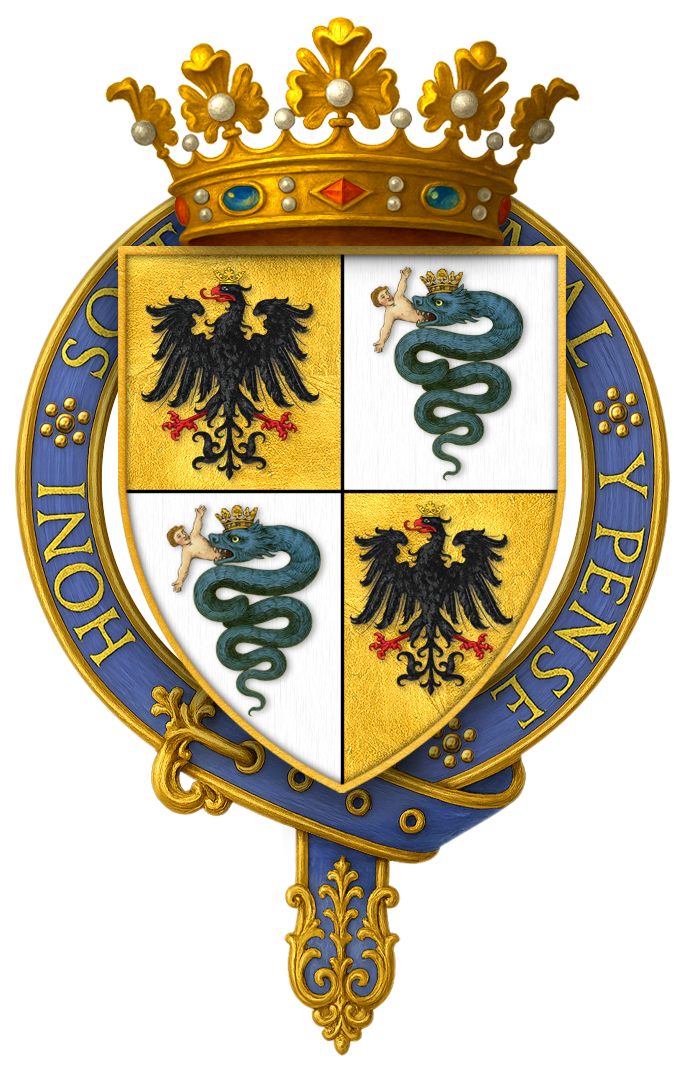
Francesco's coat of arms encircled with the garter

Francesco Sforza was born in Cigoli, near San Miniato, Tuscany, one of the seven illegitimate sons of the condottiero Muzio Sforza and Lucia de Martini. He was the brother of Alessandro Sforza. He spent his childhood in Tricarico (in the modern Basilicata), the marquisate of which he was granted in 1412 by King Ladislaus of Naples. In 1418, he married Polissena Ruffo, a Calabrese noblewoman.

From 1419, he fought alongside his father, soon gaining fame for being able to bend metal bars with his bare hands. He later proved himself to be an expert tactician and a very skilled field commander. After the death of his father during the War of L'Aquila, he participated in Braccio da Montone's final defeat in that campaign; he fought subsequently for the Neapolitan army and then for Pope Martin V and the Duke of Milan, Filippo Maria Visconti. After some successes, he fell in disgrace and was sent to the castle of Mortara as a prisoner. He regained his status after leading an expedition against Lucca.

In 1431, after fighting again for the Papal States, he led the Milanese army against Venice; the following year the duke's daughter, Bianca Maria, was betrothed to him. Despite these moves, the wary Filippo Maria never ceased to be distrustful of Sforza. The allegiance of mercenary leaders was dependent, of course, on pay; in 1433–1435, Sforza led the Milanese attack on the Papal States, but when he conquered Ancona, in Marche, he changed sides, obtaining the title of vicar of the city directly from Pope Eugene IV. In 1436–39, he served variously both in Florence and Venice.

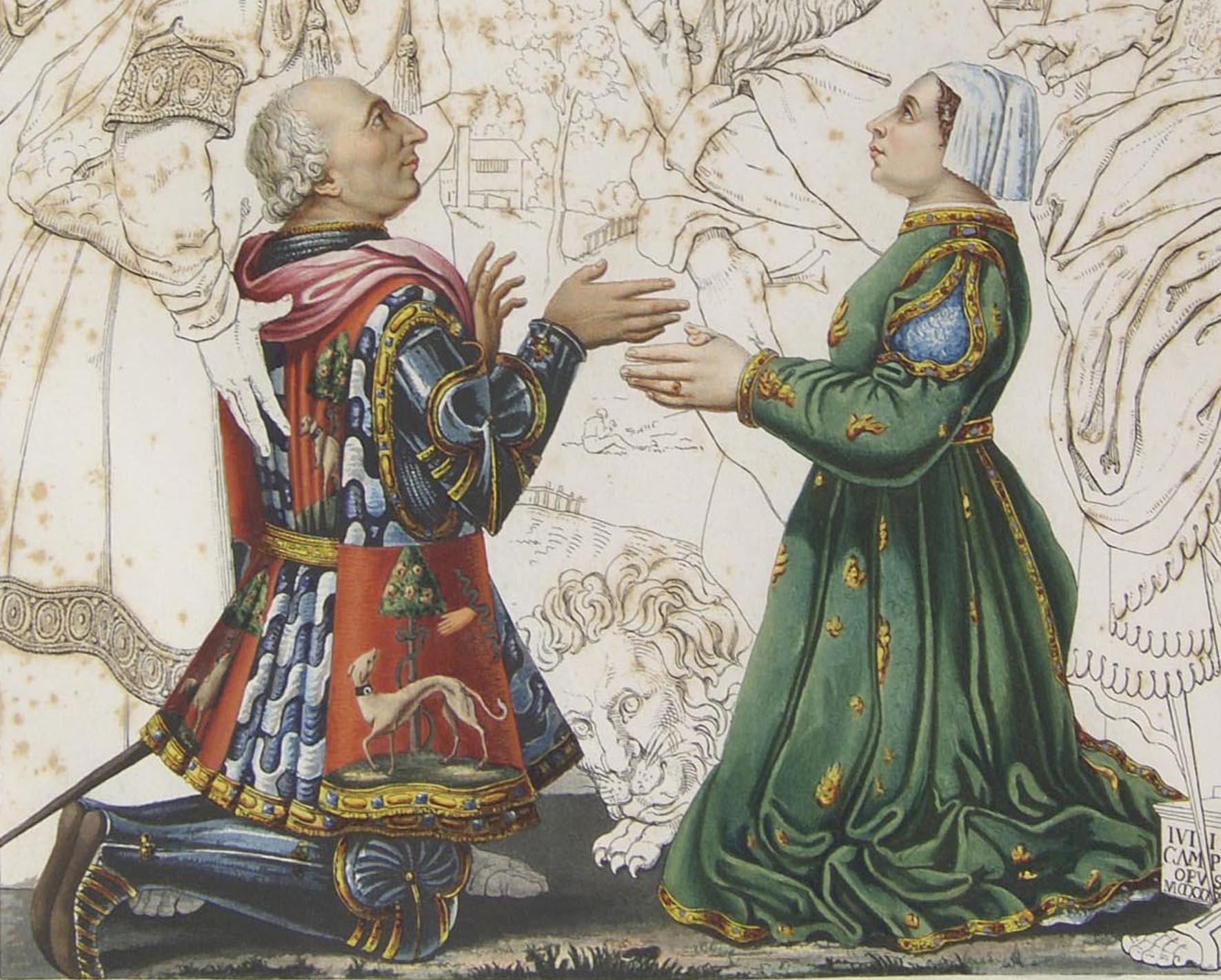
Bianca Maria Visconti and Francesco Sforza in Famiglie celebri italiane, by Pompeo Litta Biumi (1823)

In 1440, his fiefs in the Kingdom of Naples were occupied by King Alfonso I, and, to recover the situation, Sforza reconciled himself with Filippo Visconti. On 25 October 1441, he could finally marry Bianca Maria in Cremona as part of the agreements that ended the war between Milan and Venice. (Local legend apocryphally dates the origin of the city's famed torrone nougat to the wedding festivities.) The following year, he allied with René of Anjou, pretender to the throne of Naples, and marched against southern Italy. After some initial setbacks, he defeated the Neapolitan commander Niccolò Piccinino, who had invaded his possessions in Romagna and Marche, through the help of Sigismondo Pandolfo Malatesta (who had married his daughter Polissena) and the Venetians, and could return to Milan.

Sforza later found himself warring against Francesco Piccinino (whom he defeated at the Battle of Montolmo in 1444) and, later, the alliance of Visconti, Eugene IV, and Malatesta, who had allegedly murdered Polissena. With the help of Venice, Sforza was again victorious and, in exchange for abandoning the Venetians, received the title of capitano generale (commander-in-chief) of the Duchy of Milan's armies.

=== Duke of Milan ===
After Filippo Maria Visconti, duke of Milan, died without a male heir in 1447, fighting broke out to restore the so-called Ambrosian Republic. The name Ambrosian Republic takes its name from St. Ambrose, the patron saint of Milan. Agnese del Maino, his wife's mother, convinced the condottiero who held Pavia to restore it to him.

He also received the seigniory of other cities of the duchy, including Lodi, and started to carefully plan the conquest of the ephemeral republic, allying with William VIII of Montferrat and (again) Venice. In 1450, after years of famine, riots raged in the streets of Milan and the city's senate decided to entrust him with the duchy. Sforza entered the city as duke on 26 February. It was the first time that such a title was handed over by a lay institution. While the other Italian states gradually recognized Sforza as the legitimate Duke of Milan, he was never able to obtain official investiture from the Holy Roman Emperor. That did not come to the Sforza Dukes until 1494, when Emperor Maximilian formally invested Francesco's son, Ludovico, as duke of Milan.

Under his rule (which was moderate and skilful), Sforza modernised the city and duchy. He created an efficient system of taxation that generated enormous revenues for the government; his court became a centre of Renaissance learning and culture, and the people of Milan grew to love him. In Milan, he founded the Ospedale Maggiore, restored the Palazzo ducale, and had the Naviglio d'Adda, a channel connecting with the River Adda, built.

During Sforza's reign, Florence was under the command of Cosimo de' Medici and the two rulers became close friends. This friendship eventually manifested first in the Peace of Lodi and then in the Italian League, a multi-polar defensive alliance of Italian states that succeeded in stabilising almost all of Italy for its duration. After the peace, Sforza renounced part of the conquests in eastern Lombardy obtained by his condottieri Bartolomeo Colleoni, Ludovico Gonzaga, and Roberto Sanseverino d'Aragona after 1451. As King Alfonso I of Naples was among the signatories of the treaty, Sforza also abandoned his long support of the Angevin pretenders to Naples. He also aimed to conquer Genoa, then an Angevin possession; when a revolt broke out there in 1461, he had Spinetta Campofregoso elected as Doge, as his puppet. Sforza occupied Genoa and Savona in 1464.

Sforza was the first European ruler to follow a foreign policy based on the concept of the balance of power, and the first native Italian ruler to conduct extensive diplomacy outside the peninsula to counter the power of threatening states such as France. Sforza's policies succeeded in keeping foreign powers from dominating Italian politics for the rest of the century.

Edward IV of England sought to strengthen friendly relations with Sforza and accordingly offered him membership in the prestigious Order of the Garter. He accepted and became a knight of the Garter in 1463.

Sforza suffered from hydropsy and gout. In 1462, rumours spread that he was dead and a riot exploded in Milan. He, however, survived for four more years, finally dying in March 1466. He was succeeded as duke by his son, Galeazzo Maria Sforza.

Francesco's successor Ludovico commissioned Leonardo da Vinci to design an equestrian statue as part of a monument to Francesco I Sforza. A clay model of a horse, which was to be used as part of the design, was completed by Leonardo in 1492—but the statue was never built. In 1999, the horse alone was cast from Leonardo's original designs in bronze and placed in Milan outside the racetrack of Ippodromo del Galoppo.

== Marriage and issue ==
Francesco Sforza was married three times:

- His first wife, Polissena Ruffo (married in 1418, died 1420), gave birth to:
  - Antonia Polissena (1420–1420), who died shortly after birth; her mother died in childbirth.
- His second wife, Maria Caldora (married April 1424), (Note: Lubkin indicates only a woman with the last name Caldora was Francesco's second wife.) daughter of Jacopo Caldora, had no issue. The marriage was dissolved in 1430 by Pope Martin V.
- His third and most prominent wife, Bianca Maria Visconti, daughter of Filippo Maria Visconti, bore him the following children:
  - Galeazzo Maria Sforza (1444–1476), Duke of Milan 1466–1476.
  - Ippolita Maria Sforza (1445–1484), wife of Alfonso II of Naples and mother of Isabella of Aragon.
  - One unnamed child who died at birth.
  - Filippo Maria (1449–1492), Count of Corsica; married his cousin Costanza Sforza, with whom he had a daughter, Bona.
  - Sforza Maria Sforza (1451–1479), Duke of Bari; betrothed or married to Eleanor of Naples, Duchess of Ferrara.
  - Francesco Galeazzo Maria (1453–?), died young.
  - Ludovico Maria Sforza (1452–1508), Duke of Bari (1479–1494), and Duke of Milan (1494–1499).
  - Ascanio Maria Sforza (1455–1505), Abbot of Chiaraville, Bishop of Pavia, Cremona, Pesaro, and Novara; Cardinal.
  - Elisabetta Maria (1456–1473), wife of William VIII, Marquess of Montferrat.
  - Ottaviano Maria (1458–1477), Count of Lugano; drowned while escaping arrest.

Francesco Sforza had several illegitimate children, some of whom were formally acknowledged.

With Giovanna d'Acquapendente, his official mistress between the death of his first wife and his marriage to Bianca Maria Visconti, he had at least seven children:

- Polissena (b. 1422), died young.
- Isolea or Isotta (1427–1485/87), married Andrea Matteo Acquaviva and, after his death, Giovanni Mauruzi.
- Polissena Sforza (1428–1449), married Sigismondo Pandolfo Malatesta.
- Sforza Secondo Sforza (1433–1492/93), Count of Borgonuovo; married Antonia dal Verme, daughter of Luigi dal Verme.
- Drusiana Sforza (1437–1474), married Jacopo Piccinino.
- Tristano, no further details.
- Leonetta, no further details.

With Brigida Caimi:

- Giovanni Maria Sforza (1461–1510/13), Archbishop of Genoa from 1498.

With Elisabetta de Prata:

- Giulio, married Margherita Grassi, daughter of Tommaso Grassi, *Patrizio di Milano*.

With Perpetua di Varese:

- Polidoro (1442–1475), married Antonia Malaspina, an illegitimate daughter of Spinetta of Verrucola.

With Elisabetta da Robecco (also known as Elisabetta delle Grazie):

- Leonardo, no further details.
- Julius, no further details.

By unknown mothers:

- Tristano Sforza (1424–1477), married Beatrice d'Este, an illegitimate daughter of Niccolò III d'Este, Marquess of Ferrara.
- Bona Francesca (d. 1513).
- Bianca Maria, no further details.
- Fiordelisa Maria, married Guidaccio Manfredi.
- Bartolomeo, no further details.
- Antonio, no further details.
- Paolo (b. 1454), no further details.
- Lucia, became a nun.
- Taddea, became a nun.
- Clara, became a nun.
- Elisa, no further details.
- Griselda (1452–1495), no further details.
- Beatrice (1455–1493), no further details.
- Ottaviana (1461–1513), no further details.

== Sources ==
- Bartlett, Kenneth R. (2013). A Short History of the Italian Renaissance. University of Toronto Press. ISBN 978-1-4426-0877-1.
- Bartlett, Kenneth (2019). The Renaissance in Italy: A History. Hackett Publishing Company, Inc.
- Echols, Anne; Williams, Marty (1992). An annotated index of medieval women. Markus Wiener Publishing, Inc.
- Fallows, Noel (2010). Jousting in Medieval and Renaissance Iberia. The Boydell Press.
- Fletcher, Stella (2013). The Longman Companion to Renaissance Europe, 1390-1530. Routledge.
- Gregorovius, Ferdinand (1967). History of the City of Rome in the Middle Ages. Vol. 7. AMS Press.
- Ippolito, Antonio Menniti (1998). "Francesco I Sforza, duca di Milano". Dizionario Biografico degli Italiani. Vol. 50. Treccani.
- Lubkin, Gregory (1994). A Renaissance Court: Milan under Galleazzo Maria Sforza. University of California Press.
- Lucas, Henry S. (1960). The Renaissance and the Reformation. Harper Bros.: New York.
- Rendina, Claudio (1994). I capitani di ventura. Rome: Netwon Compton.
- Robin, Diana, ed. (2009). Francesco Filelfo: Odes. Harvard University Press.
- Ross, Charles (1997). Edward IV. Yale University Press. ISBN 978-0-30007-371-3.
- Walsh, Richard J. (2005). Charles the Bold and Italy (1467-1477): Politics and Personnel. Liverpool University Press.
- Vale, Malcolm (2022). "England and Europe: England and Europe c.1450 - 1520: Nostalagia or New Opportunities?". In Clark, Linda (ed.). The Fifteenth Century XIX: Enmity and Amity. The Boydell Press. ISBN 978-1-78327-742-1.
- Williams, George L. (1998). Papal Genealogy: The Families and Descendants of the Popes. McFarland & Company, Inc.

Vacant Ambrosian Republic Title last held by Filippo Maria Visconti	Duke of Milan; 1450–1466	Succeeded by Galeazzo Maria Sforza
