= Bianca Maria Visconti =

Duchess of Milan (1425–1468)

- Duchess of Milan; Regent of Milan and Marche
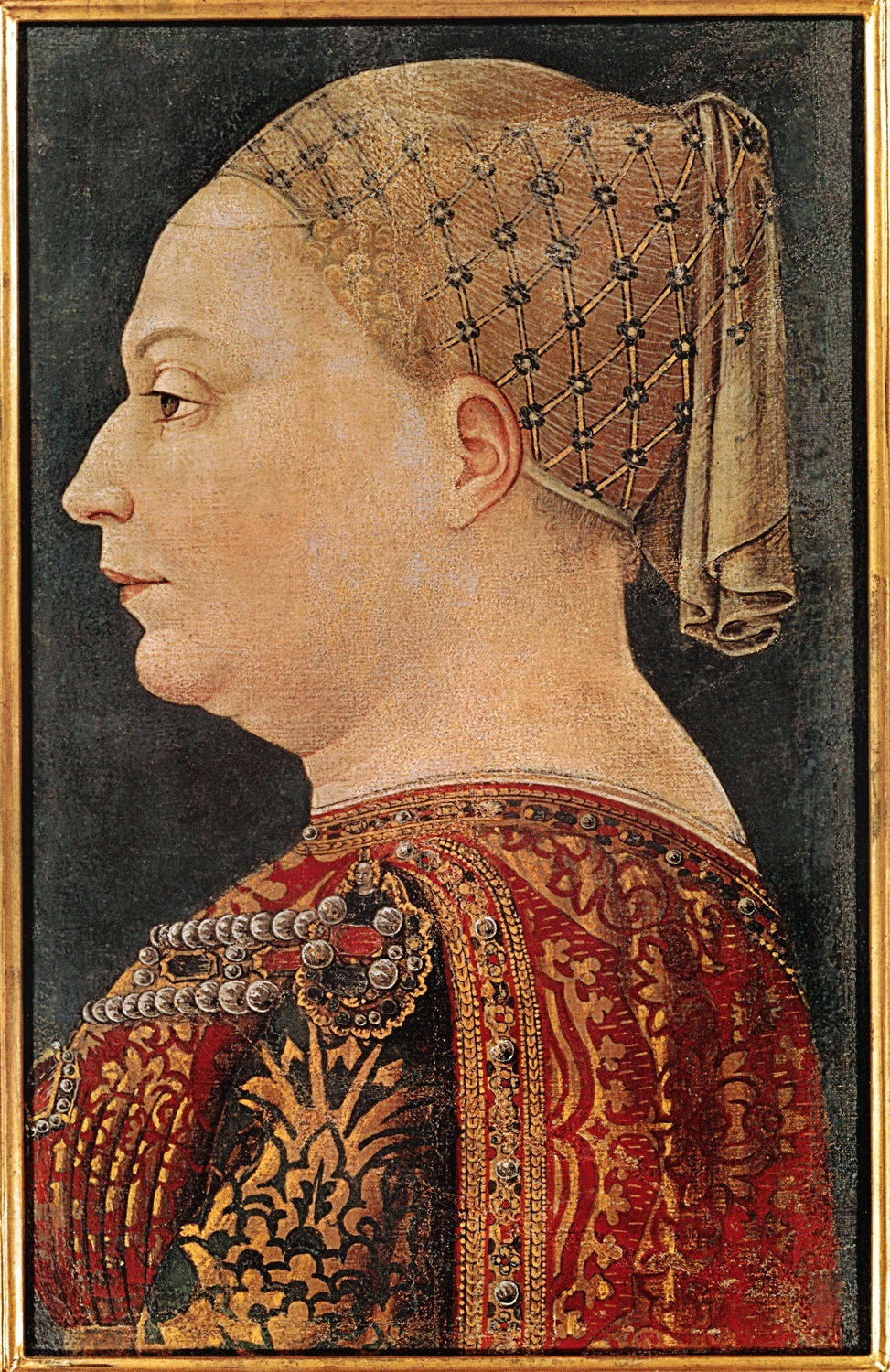
- Bianca Maria Visconti in a portrait by Bonifacio Bembo, Pinacoteca di Brera, Milan
- Other names: Bianca Maria Sforza; Blanca Maria
- Born: 31 March 1425; Settimo Pavese, Duchy of Milan
- Died: 28 October 1468 (aged 43); Cremona
- Noble family: Visconti
- Spouse: Francesco I Sforza
- Issue among others...: Galeazzo Maria, Duke of Milan; Ippolita Maria, Duchess of Calabria; Ludovico il Moro, Duke of Milan; Ascanio Maria, Bishop of Pavia
- Father: Filippo Maria Visconti, Duke of Milan
- Mother: Agnese del Maino

Bianca Maria Visconti (31 March 1425 – 28 October 1468), also known as Bianca Maria Sforza or Blanca Maria, was Duchess of Milan from 1450 to 1468 by marriage to Francesco I Sforza.

She acted as regent of the Marche during her husband's absence in 1448. She also served as regent of the Duchy of Milan in 1462, during his illness, and again in 1466 between his death and the return of their son—the new Duke of Milan—who was absent at the time.

== Biography ==
=== Early years ===
Bianca Maria was born near Settimo Pavese as the illegitimate daughter of Filippo Maria Visconti, Duke of Milan and the last ruler of the Visconti dynasty, and his mistress Agnese del Maino. Agnese was the daughter of Ambrogio del Maino, a Milanese nobleman and ducal questore, and served as lady-in-waiting to Filippo's wife, Beatrice di Tenda. The couple had a second daughter, named Caterina Maria or Lucia Maria, who was also born in Settimo in 1426 but died shortly after birth.

When Bianca Maria was six months old, her father sent her and Agnese to a castle in Abbiate, where a luxurious residence was prepared for them. The Duke frequently visited them there and was reportedly impressed by his daughter's strong character.

Bianca Maria spent her childhood and adolescence in Abbiategrasso, receiving a humanist education. The ducal library housed a wide array of texts, including Latin classics, narrative works in Provençal and French, scientific and didactic treatises, as well as works in Italian and volgare—mostly by Tuscan authors. Both she and her father were passionate about hunting and shared a love of horses.

=== Bethrothal and wedding ===
In 1430, at the age of five, Visconti was betrothed to the condottiero Francesco I Sforza, a man twenty-four years her elder. In that year the condotta (contract) between Milan and Sforza came to an end, and the betrothal was a move to keep the powerful general tied to Milan. It has also been suggested that Visconti enticed Sforza with the promise of appointing him as legitimate heir to the duchy. Sforza probably also accepted because of the rich dowry, which included territories in the areas of Cremona, Castellazzo di Bollate and Bosco Frugarolo. The contract was signed on 23 February 1432 in the castle of Porta Giovia, the Visconti residence in Milan. Visconti's official spokesperson was her godfather, Andrea Visconti, general of the Humiliates order. The presence of Visconti and her mother at the ceremony is not certain; according to some sources, she visited Milan for the first time when she was already of marrying age.

In the following years, the suspicious Filippo Maria tried twice to dissolve the betrothal with the ambitious Sforza: in 1434, after the latter had sided with Pope Eugene IV, who sent him to fight Milan, Carlo Gonzaga, the son of the Marquis of Mantua, was contacted. The later project of betrothing Visconti to Leonello d'Este, marquis of Ferrara, Modena and Reggio, was only a political move to pressure Sforza to leave the alliance formed by the Republic of Venice against Milan. Visconti's trip to Ferrara at that time (September 1440) was also her first confirmed trip outside Abbiategrasso. The attempt to force Sforza to change alliances was fruitless, and Visconti returned to her castle in April 1441.

Also in 1441, Niccolò Piccinino, captain of the Milanese troops, created difficulties for Sforza; he asked Visconti for lordship of Piacenza in return for his capture of Sforza. Visconti then moved toward reconciling with Sforza, suspending hostilities and sending him peace proposals, together with the proxy for the marriage with Visconti.

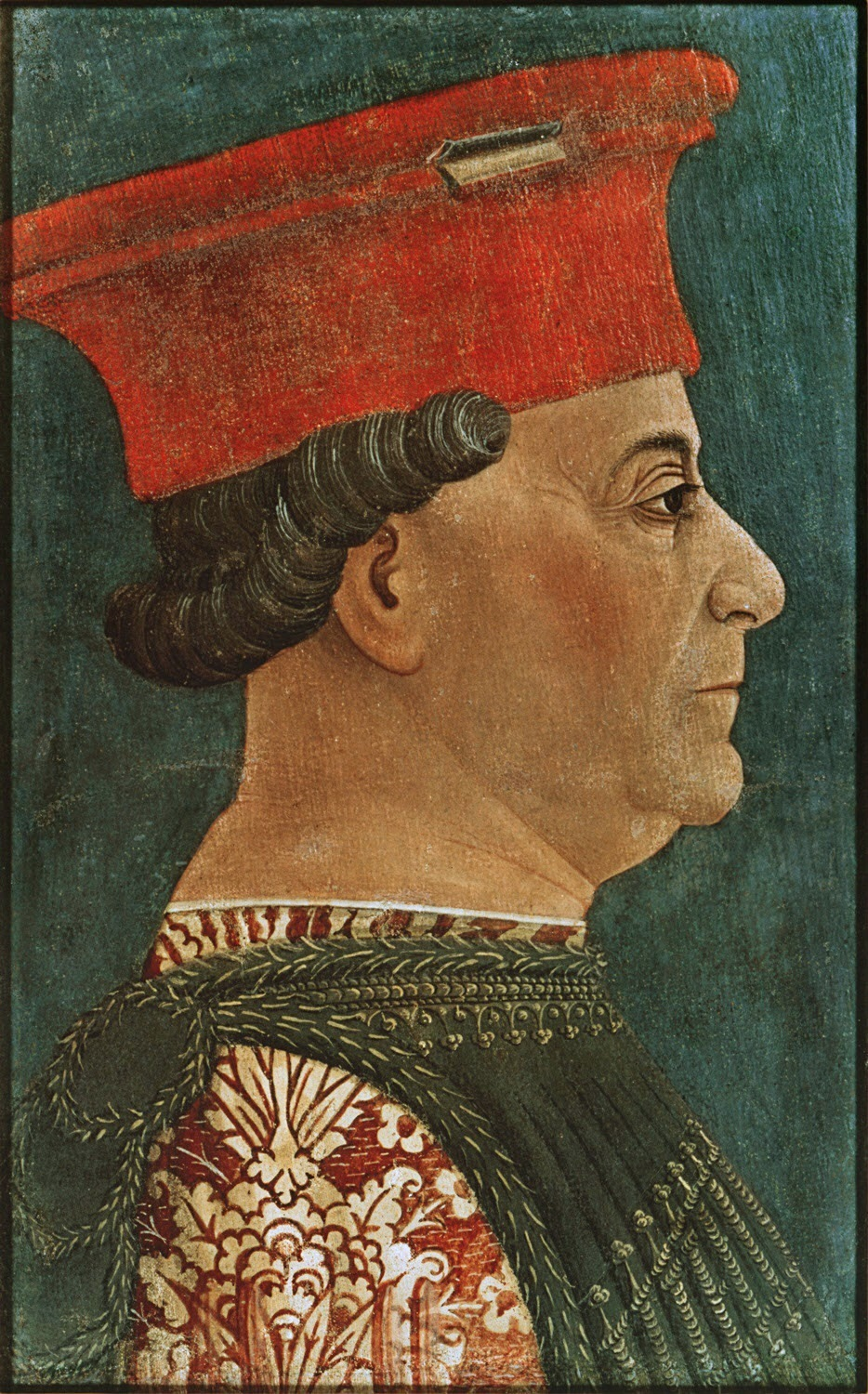
Francesco Sforza.

On 24 October 1441 Francesco Sforza and Bianca Maria Visconti were wed in the Abbey of San Sigismondo in Cremona, preferring that city's Cathedral for security reasons. In the typical Italian Renaissance manner, feasts lasted for several days. In local legends probably invented during the 20th century, the sumptuous banquet, tournaments, palio, and allegorical carts of the festivities are joined by a huge cake reproduction of the Torrazzo, the city's main tower, which is said to have been the origin of Cremonese nougat (torrone).

=== Marriage ===
On 7 November 1441, Filippo Maria issued a decree reducing the rights of his vassals, Sforza included. The latter preferred to establish himself in the safer territory of Venetia, in the hamlet of Sanguinetto. In the same years, Sforza and Visconti were invited to Venice by the doge of Venice, Francesco Foscari. Shortly thereafter, news that Piccinino was menacing Sforza's possessions in the Marche reached the city. Visconti then accompanied her husband to Rimini, where they were guests of Sigismondo Pandolfo Malatesta, in Gradara and then in Jesi. Here she remained in the castle while Sforza led the military operations against Piccinino. In 1442, Visconti (then 17 years old) was named regent of the Marche; contemporary chronicles state that Visconti had repeatedly proven her skills in administration and diplomacy. While Sforza was unfaithful to Visconti, she usually reacted to his infidelity with nonchalance. On one occasion, however, in 1443, one of her husband's mistresses disappeared and was killed in dubious circumstances.

In 1442, Sforza was excommunicated. Four years later, ill and declining, Filippo Maria Visconti approached Sforza for a reconciliation. The latter, however, remained distrustful, and, despite Visconti's pleading, preferred to concentrate on the defence of his territories, menaced by Papal troops. In 1447, Sforza, feeling more confident, accepted the position of lieutenant of the Duchy of Milan, but Visconti, jealous and suspicious after the popularity of Sforza in Milan, soon changed his mind. At the same time, the new Pope, Nicholas V, demanded the restitution of Jesi.

Francesco Sforza gave back to the pope the town of Jesi in exchange for 35,000 florins, and moved towards Milan along with his wife. News of the death of Filippo Maria Visconti, who died in the night between 13 and 14 August 1447, reached Sforza in Cotignola. Visconti was very angry when she heard about the depredations suffered by the Visconti properties in Milan after Filippo's death. Visconti and Sforza were marching toward Milan, with 4,000 knights and 2,000 infantry, when the newborn Ambrosian Republic, under the menace of a Venetian invasion, offered Sforza the title of Captain General. Visconti favoured refusing, but Sforza accepted, starting three years in which he strove to reconquer the cities that had declared independence from the Duchy after Filippo Visconti's death.

In May 1448, when Sforza was in Pavia, the Venetians attacked Cremona. According to the chronicles, Visconti donned a suit of parade armour and, along with some troops and the populace, hurried to defend the city's walls. She fought in the battle that ensued for the whole day. This episode gained her fame as a "warrior woman".

After the Venetian danger had been repulsed, Visconti settled in the Visconti Castle of Pavia, together with a large court. Her good relationships with her Visconti relatives gained popular support, as well as loans and funds, for the fragile new state created by her husband. On 24 February 1450, a revolt broke out in Milan. The Venetian ambassador was killed, as the Venetian Republic was deemed responsible for the famine that had struck Milan. A meeting of nobles and citizens recognized Sforza as lord.

=== Duchess of Milan ===
The date of the entrance of the new duke and duchess in Milan is disputed: 22 March or 25 March. Sforza and Visconti refused the triumphal wagon (they called it superstizione da re, "kings' superstition"), instead reaching the Duomo riding on a couple of horses. It was the first time that a duke's title had been awarded by the citizens of the city.

During the first years of their reign, Visconti collaborated with her husband in recovering her father's assets and restoring the Ducal Palace. Sforza was again entangled in a war against Venice. Remaining alone in Milan, Visconti devoted herself to the administration of the Duchy, as attested by the correspondence with her husband, which gives precious insights into the education of their children, state affairs, the financial difficulties, and details of her daily life. The letters also show the assertive character of Visconti, who did not hesitate to express her opinions even when they differed from her husband's. The letters also include accusations of his extramarital adventures.

In 1453, in Pavia, Visconti hosted René I of Naples, who was asked to go to Cremona with his army to fight alongside Sforza. She later showed him the construction site of the large new Castello Sforzesco in Milan.

After the Peace of Lodi in 1454, Visconti devoted herself not only to diplomacy and the restoration and embellishment of the several Ducal residences, but also to public works. The ducal couple had a large hospital built in Milan, the Ospedale Maggiore, and often Visconti offered direct help to numerous poor women. With her support both Santa Nicola and Santa Maria della Pace were constructed. She sent court painter, Zanetto Bugatto, to Brussels to study with Rogier van der Weyden.

In 1459, Pope Pius II summoned a council in Mantua to prepare a crusade against the Ottoman Turks. Visconti offered 300 knights, and Sforza was proposed as military leader of the expedition. The crusade never materialized, but Sforza and Visconti's support of the papacy gained them bulls of indulgence for the Duomo and the Ospedale Maggiore of Milan.

In 1462, Francesco Sforza, who suffered from gout and dropsy, fell ill. During his absence from the government, Visconti's political and administrative capabilities prevented the state from crumbling after some rebellions spurred by Venice. She acted effectively as co-regent of the Duchy. Visconti also promoted a marriage between Jacopo Piccinino, the son of Niccolò, and Drusiana, Sforza's illegitimate daughter.

=== Dowager Duchess ===
The main problems for Visconti in this period came from their eldest son, Galeazzo Maria, whose unstable and treacherous character created numerous troubles for her. On 13 December 1465, her mother, Agnese del Maino, died. Shortly afterwards, on 8 March 1466, Duke Francesco Sforza died also. Visconti quickly took the reins of the duchy as regent and called back Galeazzo Maria, who was fighting alongside the king of France, to succeed as duke. The latter's behaviour was initially one of gratitude and deference towards his mother, but soon greed and ruthlessness led him to act independently against Visconti's advice. As time passed, the Duke relegated his mother to an increasingly secondary role and in the end forced her to leave Milan. She then moved to Cremona, her dower city. According to some sources, she was thinking of giving the control of the city to Venice, and she had frequent contacts with Ferdinand I of Naples, who was aiming to overthrow Galeazzo.

Against the advice of all her counsellors, Visconti decided to take part in Galeazzo's marriage on 9 May 1468. At the end of the feasts, she accompanied her daughter Ippolita to Serravalle, whence she set off to Cremona. However, when midway, in Melegnano, she fell ill. A high fever obliged her to stay in bed until August, but she kept up an intense correspondence. At the beginning of October, her condition worsened further. She died on 28 October of that year, after having recommended her younger children, Elisabetta and Ottaviano, to their brother Galeazzo. She was buried in the Duomo of Milan, next to her husband. The funeral oration, commissioned by Galeazzo, was written by the humanist Francesco Filelfo.

Her death raised suspicions; Galeazzo Maria Sforza was accused by various men, including Bartolomeo Colleoni, of having poisoned her. It is certain that during her illness, there were in Melegnano certain men close to Galeazzo, some of whom were later involved in other cases of poisoning. According to Bernardino Corio, Visconti "died of natural ungratefulness more than poison".

== Issue ==
Bianca Maria Visconti and Francesco Sforza had ten children:

- Galeazzo Maria (24 January 1444 – 26 December 1476), Duke of Milan from 1466 to 1476.
- Ippolita Maria (18 April 1446 – 20 August 1484), wife of Alfonso II of Naples.
- A child who died at birth.
- Filippo Maria Sforza (12 December 1449 – 1492), Count of Corsica. He married his cousin Costanza Sforza (daughter of Bosio I Sforza) on 29 August 1482. They had one daughter, Bona, who later married Gian Galeazzo Visconti, Count of Sesto Calende. Filippo also had a natural son, Costanzo (1471 – 1 June 1479).
- Sforza Maria Sforza (18 August 1451 – 29 July 1479), Duke of Bari from 1464 to 1479.
- Ludovico Maria (3 August 1452 – 27 May 1508), Duke of Bari from 1479 to 1494 and Duke of Milan from 1494 to 1499.
- Francesco Galeazzo Maria (5 August 1453) – died shortly after birth, baptised.
- Ascanio Maria (3 March 1455 – 28 May 1505), Abbot of Chiaravalle, Bishop of Pavia, Cremona, Pesaro, Novara, and Cardinal.
- Elisabetta Maria Sforza (10 June 1456 – 1473), second wife of Guglielmo VIII Paleologo, Margrave of Montferrat. She had one daughter, Blanche of Montferrat.
- Ottaviano Maria Sforza, Count of Lugano (30 April 1458 – 1477), drowned while fleeing arrest.

== In literature ==
- Willis, Nathaniel Parker (1839). Bianca Visconti; or, The heart overtasked. New York, NY, USA: S. Coleman. hdl:2027/nyp.33433074801071. OCLC 56690362, 406416125, 25571529.

== See also ==
- Bianca Maria, about the name itself

== Sources ==
- Lubkin, Gregory (1994). A Renaissance Court: Milan under Galleazzo Maria Sforza. University of California Press.
- Marina, Areli (2013). "The Langobard Revival of Matteo il Magno Visconti, Lord of Milan". I Tatti Studies in the Italian Renaissance. 16 (1/2 September). University of Chicago Press: 377–414. doi:10.1086/673405. S2CID 194035594.
- Stevenson, Jane (2005). Women Latin Poets: Language, Gender, and Authority, from Antiquity to the Eighteenth Century. Oxford University Press.
- D’Elia, Anthony F. (2016). Pagan virtue in a Christian world : Sigismondo Malatesta and the Italian Renaissance. Harvard University Press.
- Daniela Pizzigalli, La signora di Milano: Vita e passioni di Bianca Maria Visconti, Rizzoli 2000
- Caterina Santoro, Gli Sforza. La casata nobiliare che resse il Ducato di Milano dal 1450 al 1535, Lampi di Stampa 1999
- Lila Jahn, Bianca Maria duchessa di Milano, Milano, Garzanti, 1941
- Winifred Terni de Gregory, Bianca Maria Visconti duchessa di Milano, Bergamo, 1940

Preceded by Marie of Savoy	Duchess consort of Milan; 1450–1466	Succeeded by Dorotea Gonzaga
