= Claudio Baggini =

Italian Roman Catholic bishop

- Bishop emeritus of Vigevano
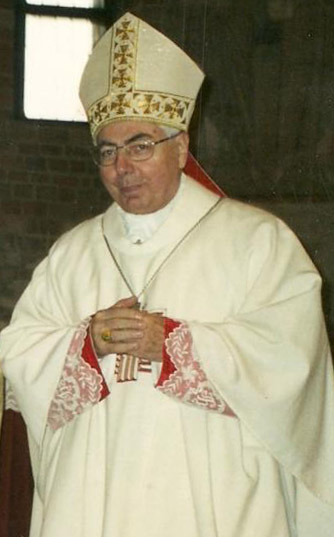
- Claudio Baggini in 2002
- Church: Roman Catholic Church
- See: Vigevano
- In office: 2000–2011
- Predecessor: Giovanni Locatelli
- Successor: Vincenzo Di Mauro
- Previous posts: Professor at seminary of Lodi; General Vicar of diocese of Lodi

Orders
- Ordination: June 14, 1959 by Mgr Tarcisio Vincenzo Benedetti, O.C.D.
- Consecration: April 30, 2000 by Bishop Giacomo Capuzzi

Personal details
- Born: 1 August 1936 Rome, Italy
- Died: 25 September 2015 (aged 79) Lodi, Italy
- Coat of arms

Claudio Baggini (1 August 1936 – 25 September 2015) was an Italian Roman Catholic bishop.

Baggini was born in Rome and was ordained a priest on 14 June 1959. He served as the Bishop of Vigevano from 18 March 2000 until his resignation on 12 March 2011.

During his ministry he welcomed pope Benedict XVI on pastoral visit to Vigevano, 21 April 2007, and assisted the beatification of Francesco Pianzola, celebrated in the cathedral of Vigevano by Cardinal José Saraiva Martins, on 4 October 2008.

He died on 25 September 2015 in Lodi at the age of 79.

Catholic Church titles
Preceded by Giovanni Locatelli	Bishop of Vigevano; March 18, 2000 – March 10, 2011	Succeeded by Vincenzo Di Mauro
