= Santa Maria del Popolo, Vigevano =

Church in Lombardy, Italy

Coordinates: 45°19′01″N 8°51′23″E

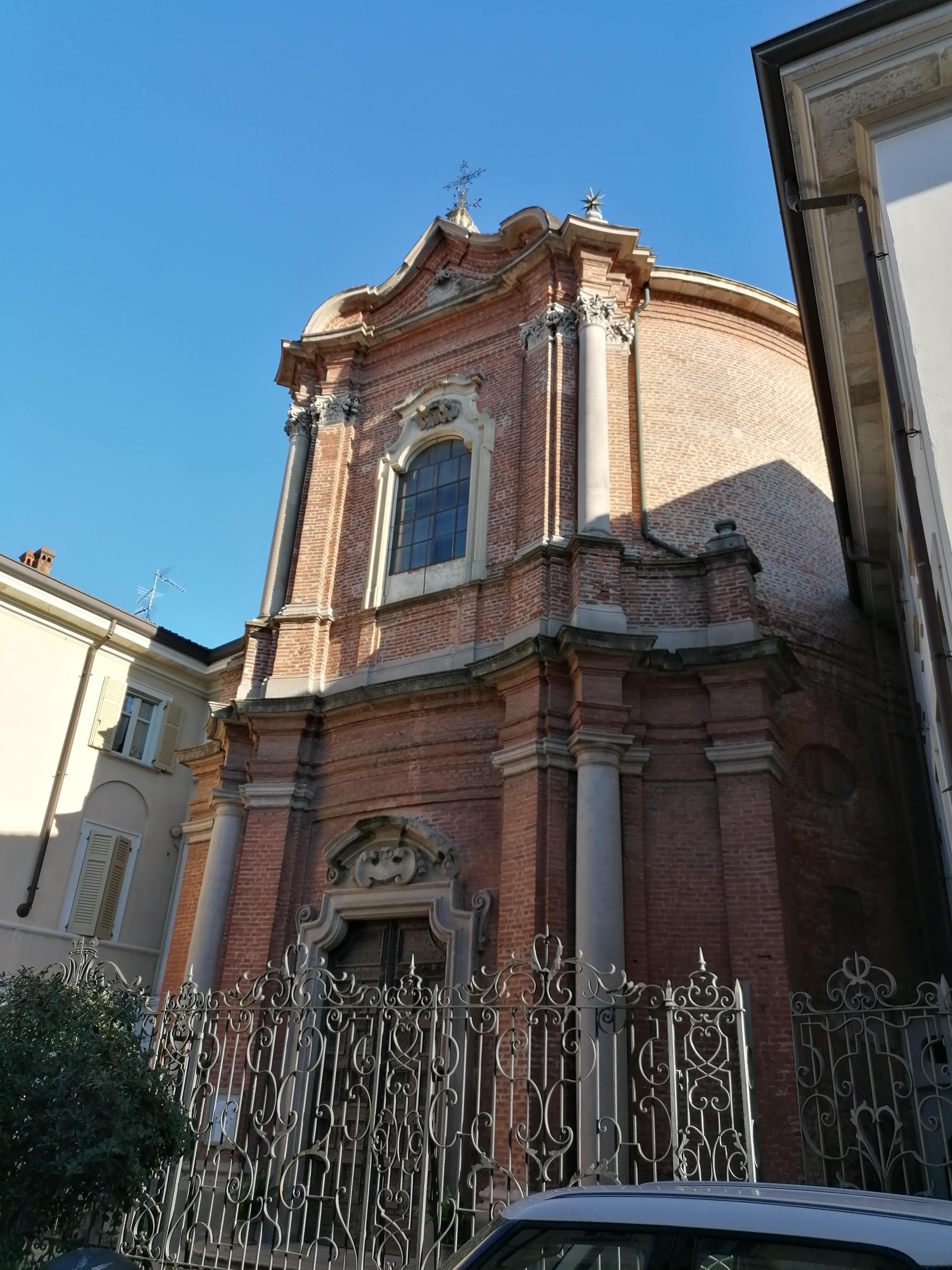
The church

The Church of Santa Maria del Popolo is a religious building located in Vigevano, in province of Pavia and diocese of Vigevano, Italy.

== Description and history ==
The church was built in 1516 by part of the brotherhood of San Dionigi, which had separated from it due to the minting of money inside the convent. The new confraternity joined the archconfraternity of Suffrage of Rome in 1621. In 1662 the Suffrage Chapel was built.

The church was rebuilt in 1608 and again in 1729, until it reached its current shape. The previous church was demolished in 1695.

Duke Francesco II Sforza donated vestments and sacred objects, including the wooden statue of the Madonna, coming from the Visconti-Sforza Castle. The paintings are by Giovan Battista Garberini and Casimiro Ottone, with the exception of the Presentazione and the Marriage, by Federico Bianchi.
