= Sant'Ignazio di Loyola, Vigevano =

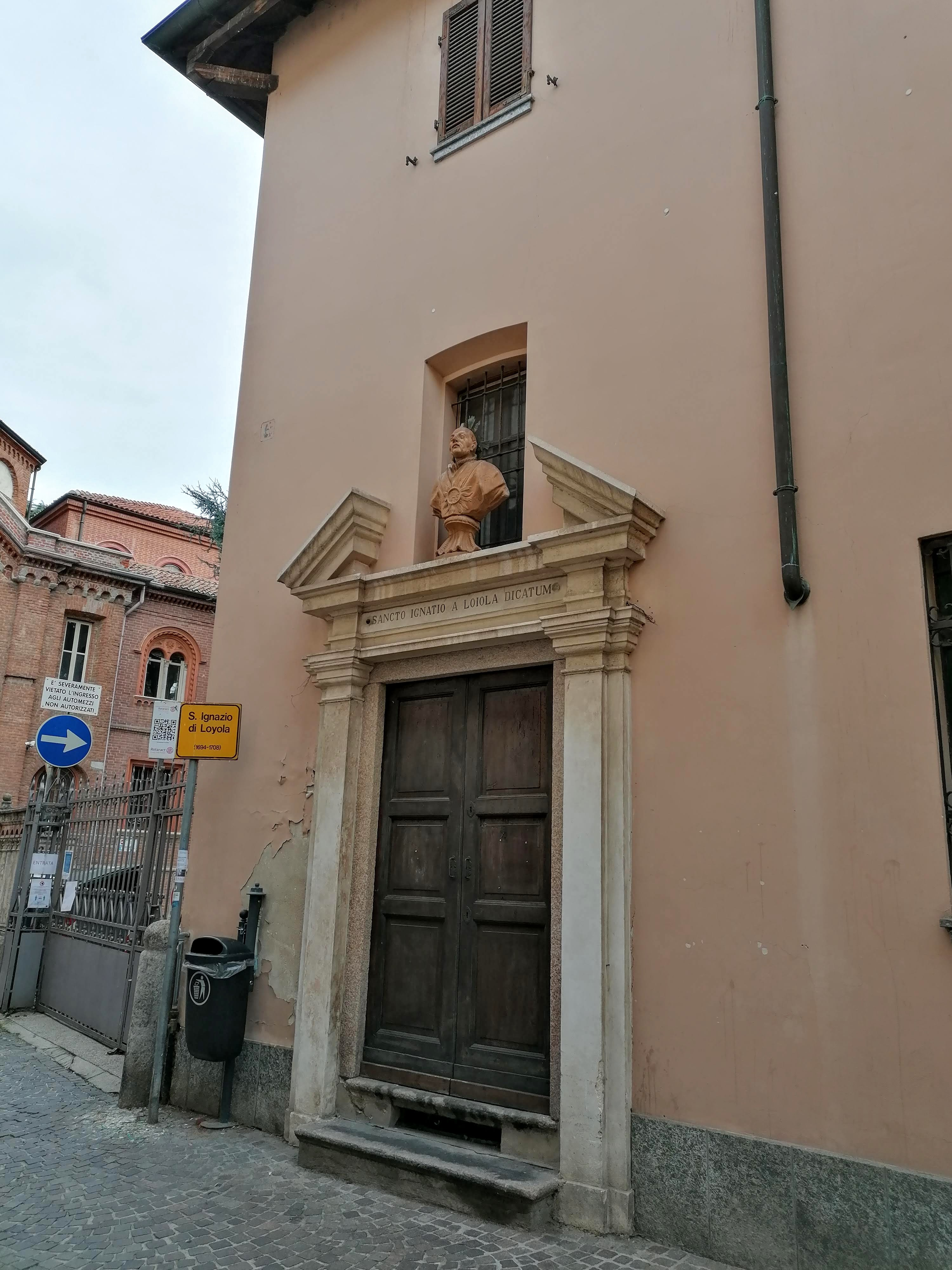
The church.

The Church of Sant'Ignazio di Loyola is a religious building in Vigevano, in province of Pavia and Diocese of Vigevano.

== Description and history ==
Built in 1694 at the behest of the canon Cantone Giovanni Maria Ferrara, the church of Sant'Ignazio di Loyola has modest dimensions. In the church there is a St. Mary venerated by St. Ignatius and other well-made paintings. On the upper floor of the church there is a library, which also contained the entire collection of books of the bishop of Vigevano Juan Caramuel y Lobkowitz; The books were subsequently taken to the Vigevano seminary and the majority were requested and transferred to the provincial seminary of Pavia.
