= 1617 =

1617 in various calendars
- Gregorian calendar: 1617; MDCXVII
- Ab urbe condita: 2370
- Armenian calendar: 1066; ԹՎ ՌԿԶ
- Assyrian calendar: 6367
- Balinese saka calendar: 1538–1539
- Bengali calendar: 1023–1024
- Berber calendar: 2567
- English Regnal year: 14 Ja. 1 – 15 Ja. 1
- Buddhist calendar: 2161
- Burmese calendar: 979
- Byzantine calendar: 7125–7126
- Chinese calendar: 丙辰年 (Fire Dragon); 4314 or 4107 — to — 丁巳年 (Fire Snake); 4315 or 4108
- Coptic calendar: 1333–1334
- Discordian calendar: 2783
- Ethiopian calendar: 1609–1610
- Hebrew calendar: 5377–5378
- Hindu calendars
- Vikram Samvat: 1673–1674
- Shaka Samvat: 1538–1539
- Kali Yuga: 4717–4718
- Holocene calendar: 11617
- Igbo calendar: 617–618
- Iranian calendar: 995–996
- Islamic calendar: 1025–1027
- Japanese calendar: Genna 3 (元和３年)
- Javanese calendar: 1537–1538
- Julian calendar: Gregorian minus 10 days
- Korean calendar: 3950
- Minguo calendar: 295 before ROC 民前295年
- Nanakshahi calendar: 149
- Thai solar calendar: 2159–2160
- Tibetan calendar: མེ་ཕོ་འབྲུག་ལོ་ (male Fire-Dragon); 1743 or 1362 or 590 — to — མེ་མོ་སྦྲུལ་ལོ་ (female Fire-Snake); 1744 or 1363 or 591

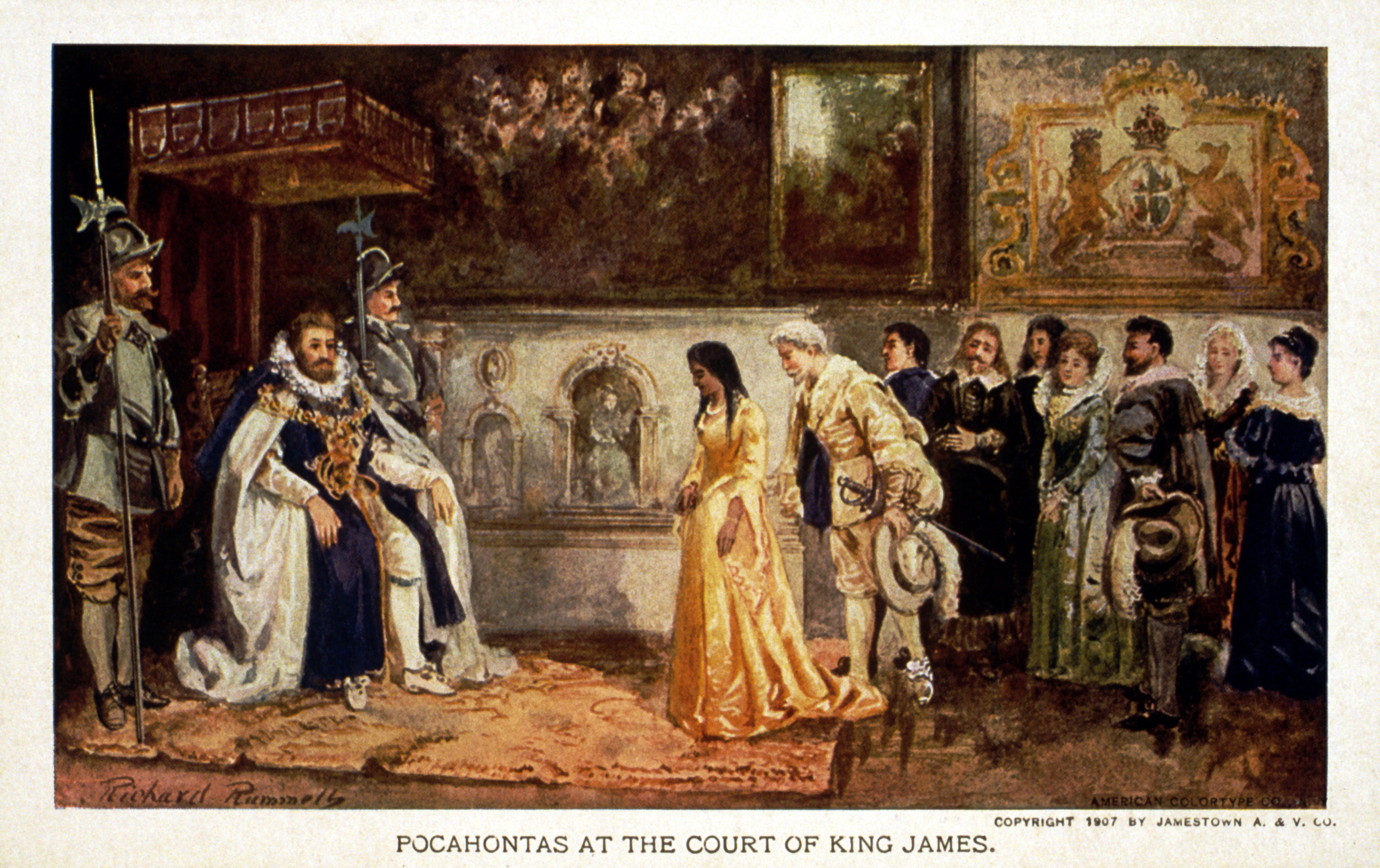
January 5: Pocahontas of the Algonquian tribe meets King James I of England

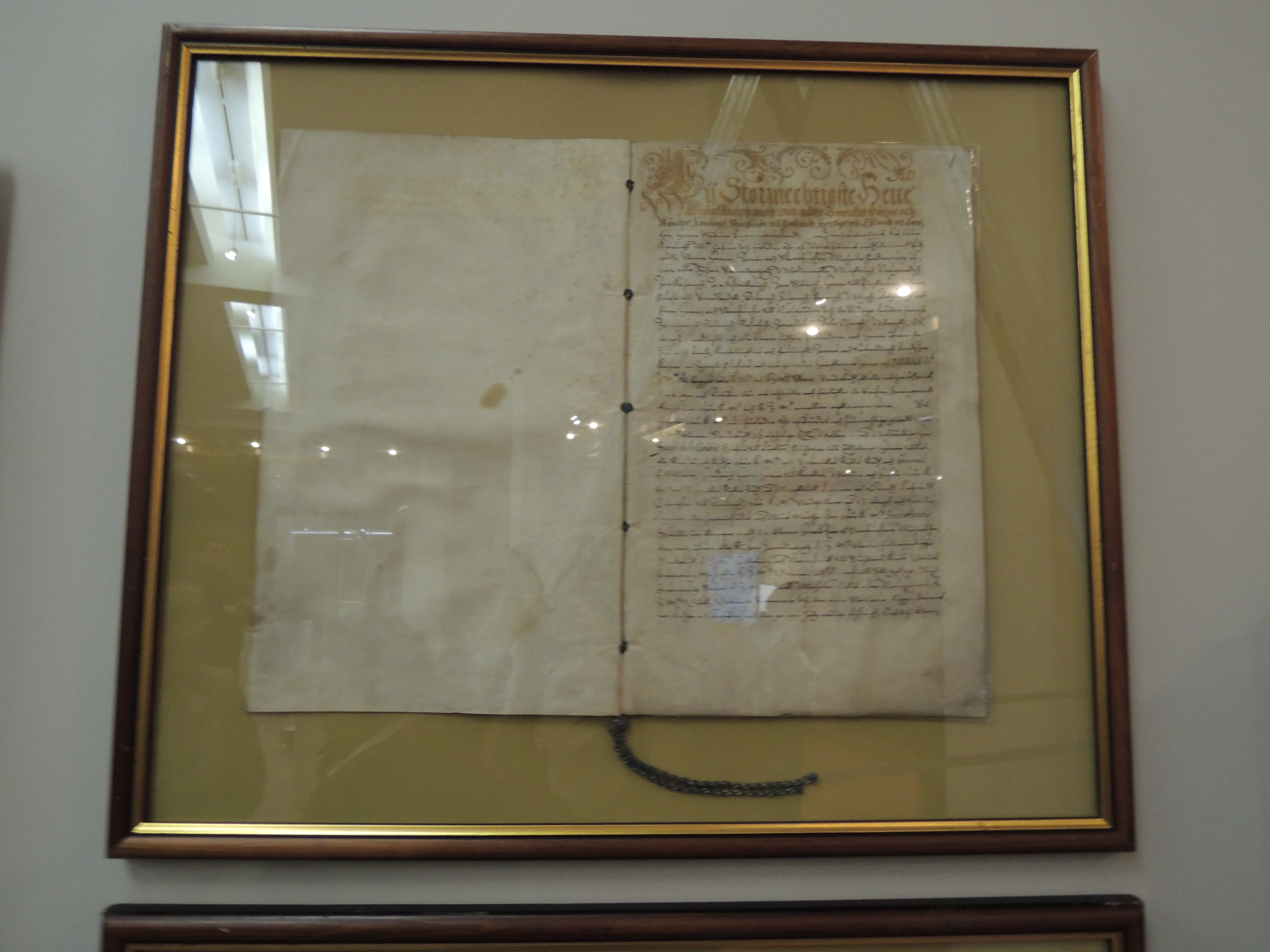
February 27: The Treaty of Stolbovo ends the Ingrian War

1617 (MDCXVII) was a common year starting on Sunday of the Gregorian calendar and a common year starting on Wednesday of the Julian calendar, the 1617th year of the Common Era (CE) and Anno Domini (AD) designations, the 617th year of the 2nd millennium, the 17th year of the 17th century, and the 8th year of the 1610s decade. As of the start of 1617, the Gregorian calendar was 10 days ahead of the Julian calendar, which remained in localized use until 1923.

== Events ==
=== January–March ===
- January 5
  - Pocahontas and Tomocomo of the Powhatan Algonquian tribe, in the Virginia colony of America, meet King James I of England as his guests, at the Banqueting House at Whitehall.
  - The Mad Lover, a play by John Fletcher, is given its first performance.
- February 27 – The Treaty of Stolbovo ends the Ingrian War between Sweden and Russia. Sweden gains Ingria and Kexholm.
- March 4 – On Shrove Tuesday, angry rioters burn down London's Cockpit Theatre because of its increase in the price of admission to its plays. Three rioters are killed when the actors at the theater defend themselves.
- March 7 – Francis Bacon is appointed as Lord Keeper of the Great Seal of England and is designated by King James I to serve as regent during the time that the King of England is away from Westminster to travel to Scotland.
- March 21 – Pocahontas (Rebecka Rolfe), daughter of the Chief of the Powhatan Algonquian tribe in the English colony of Virginia and the wife of English colonist John Rolfe, dies of smallpox after an illness of three days contracted as the couple and their son were preparing to return to America. She is buried at Gravesend.

=== April–June ===
- April 14 – Second Battle of Playa Honda: The Spanish navy defeats a Dutch fleet in the Philippines.
- April 19 – The town of Uusikaupunki (Swedish: Nystad, lit. "New Town") was founded by King Gustavus Adolphus of Sweden.
- April 24 – Encouraged by Charles d'Albert, fifteen-year-old Louis XIII, king of France, forces his mother Marie de Medici, who has held de facto power, into retirement and has her favourite, Concino Concini, assassinated.
- May 13 – King James I of England is escorted by the Earl of Home across the border to return to Scotland (where he reigns as King James VI) for the first time since the Union of the Crowns 14 years earlier in 1603. He is given lodging at Home's Dunglass Castle, East Lothian.
- May 22 – Portuguese Christian Missionary João Baptista Machado de Távora is killed, becoming the first of the 205 Martyrs of Japan.
- May 24 – King James VI of Scotland authorizes the Scottish East India Company, led by Lord Glencairn to trade to the East Indies, the Levant, Greenland, Muscovy and all other islands in the north, north-west and north-eastern seas. James VI is advised that the authorization is not in conflict with charters granted by him in his capacity as King James I of England to England's East India Company, the Levant Company, and the Muscovy Company.
- May 26 – Eliya VIII becomes the new Patriarch of the Church of the East and leader of the Christians of Mesopotamia.
- May 27 – In Germany, the Prince-Bishops of Bamberg, Eichstädt and Würzburg, and the Prince-Provost of Ellwangen, withdraw their states from the Catholic League.
- June 5 – Ferdinand II, Archduke of Inner Austria, is elected King of Bohemia. Ferdinand's forceful Catholic counter-reformation causes great unrest, amongst the Protestants and moderates in Bohemia.

=== July–September ===
- July 1 – Willem Schouten and the crew of the Dutch ship Eendracht return to the Netherlands after sailing around the world in two years and 17 days, in what is only the fourth circumnavigation of the globe, and the first since 1588. The expedition had departed from Texel on June 14, 1615 under the command of Jacob Le Maire, who died on December 22, 1616, slightly more than six months before the return to the Netherlands.
- July 29 – The secret Oñate treaty is signed in Vienna between representatives of King Philip III of Spain reached an agreement with the junior Habsburg branch of Archduke Ferdinand II of Austria, the heads of two different branches of the House of Habsburg. Spain's Ambassador to Austria, Íñigo Vélez de Guevara, 7th Count of Oñate signs on behalf of King Philip.
- August 4 – The Sharp Resolution is passed in the States of Holland and West Friesland, authorizing city governments to create their own mercenary armies, the waardgelders, to maintain public order.
- August 8 – King James of England and Scotland returns to England after having spent three months in Scotland, arriving at Wharton, Cumbria.
- August 24 – The "Fruitbearing Society" (Die Fruchtbringende Gesellschaft) of German scholars is founded in Weimar.
- September 1 – The weighing ceremony of Jahangir is described by the first English ambassador to the Mughal court, Sir Thomas Roe.
- September 23 – The Peace of Busza is signed, between the Ottoman Empire and the Polish–Lithuanian Commonwealth.

=== October–December ===
- October 9 – The Treaty of Pavia is signed between Spain and Savoy, under which Savoy returns Monferrato to Mantua.
- October 12 – The coronation ceremony of King Gustav Adolf of Sweden takes place in Stockholm, almost six years after he succeeded to the throne.
- November 17 – A naval battle between the Sicilians and Venetians ends inconclusively.
- November 22 – Mustafa I succeeds Ahmed I, as Sultan of the Ottoman Empire.
- December 15 – Sir Thomas Roe, a representative of England's East India Company, arrives in Ahmedabad at India's Mughal Empire, and seeks an audience with the Emperor, Shah Jahan. The Emperor receives Roe in an audience three weeks later, on January 6.
- December 24 – An unexpected storm strikes off the coast of Finnmark in Norway, sinking 10 ships and drowning at least 40 people. A little more than three years later, Mari Jørgensdatter tells interrogators that she and several other witches caused the storm, prompting the Vardø witch trials.
- December 30 – Lord Clifton is imprisoned at the Tower of London for threatening Francis Bacon, Lord Chancellor. Clifton is prosecuted by the Star Chamber on March 17 and eventually commits suicide in Fleet Prison.

=== Date unknown ===
- At least seven women are sentenced to death by burning for witchcraft, at the Finspång witch trial in Sweden.
- Giambattista Andreini's play The Penitent Magdalene is published in Mantua.
- The Book of Swindles, a collection of short stories on fraud in the late Ming dynasty, is published.

== Births ==
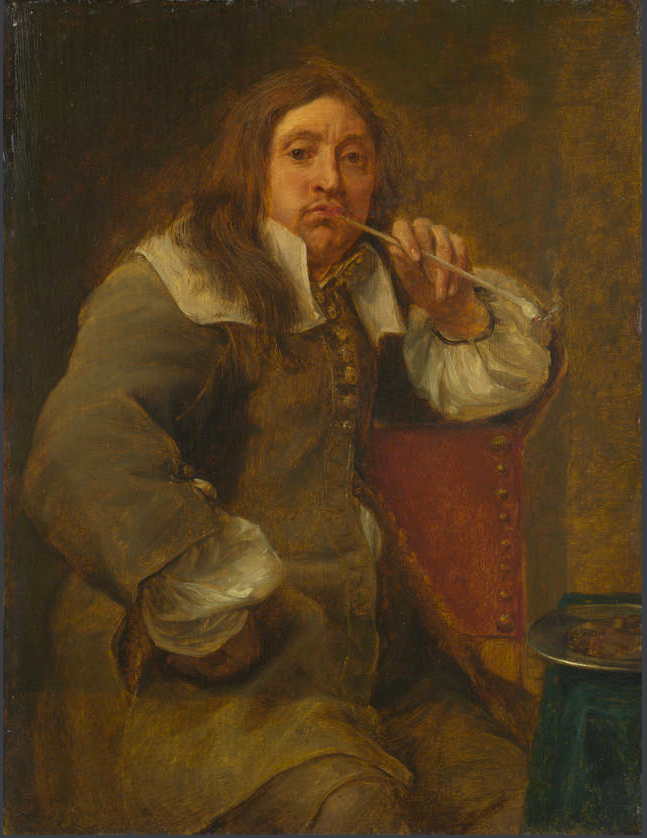
Lucas Faydherbe

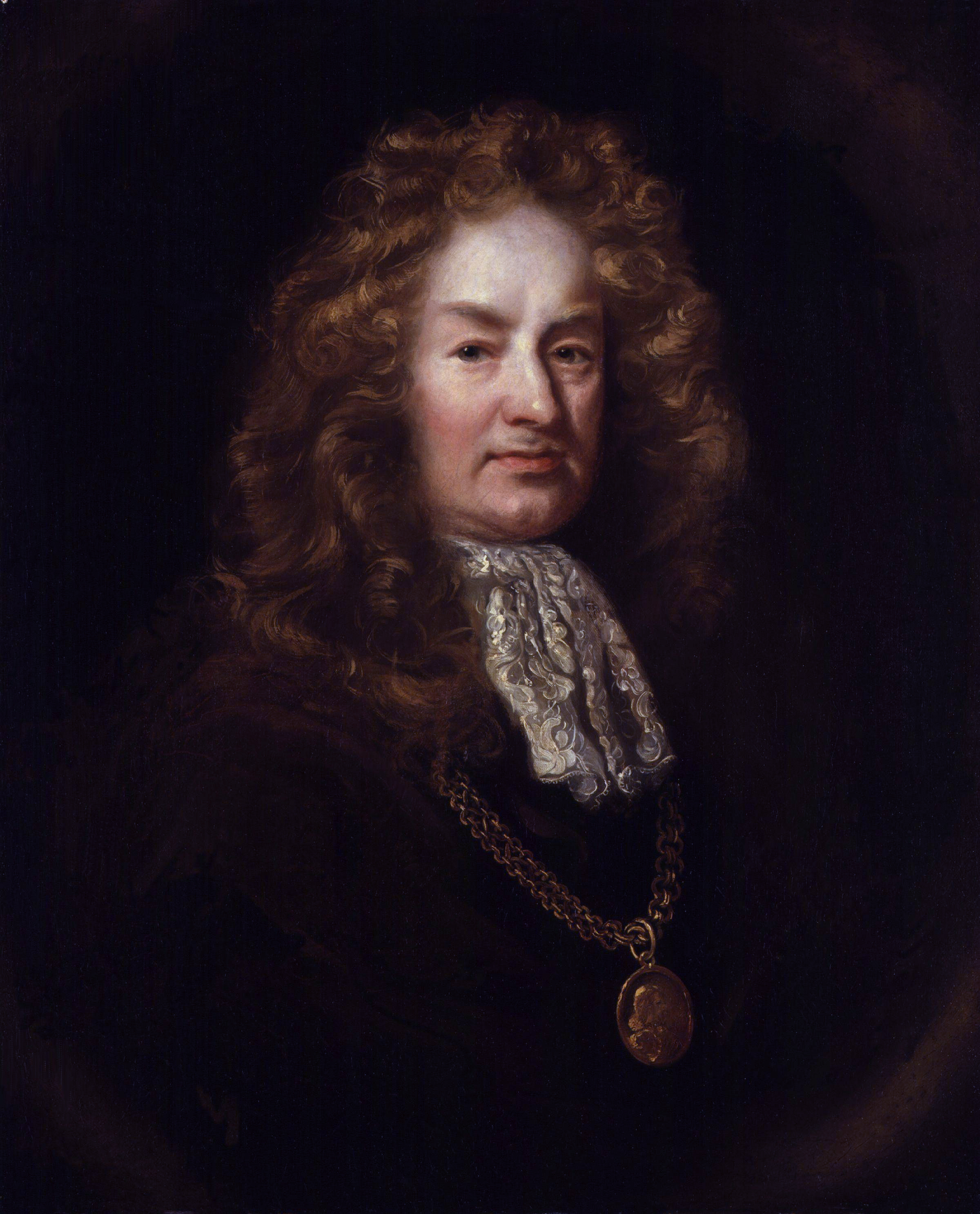
Elias Ashmole

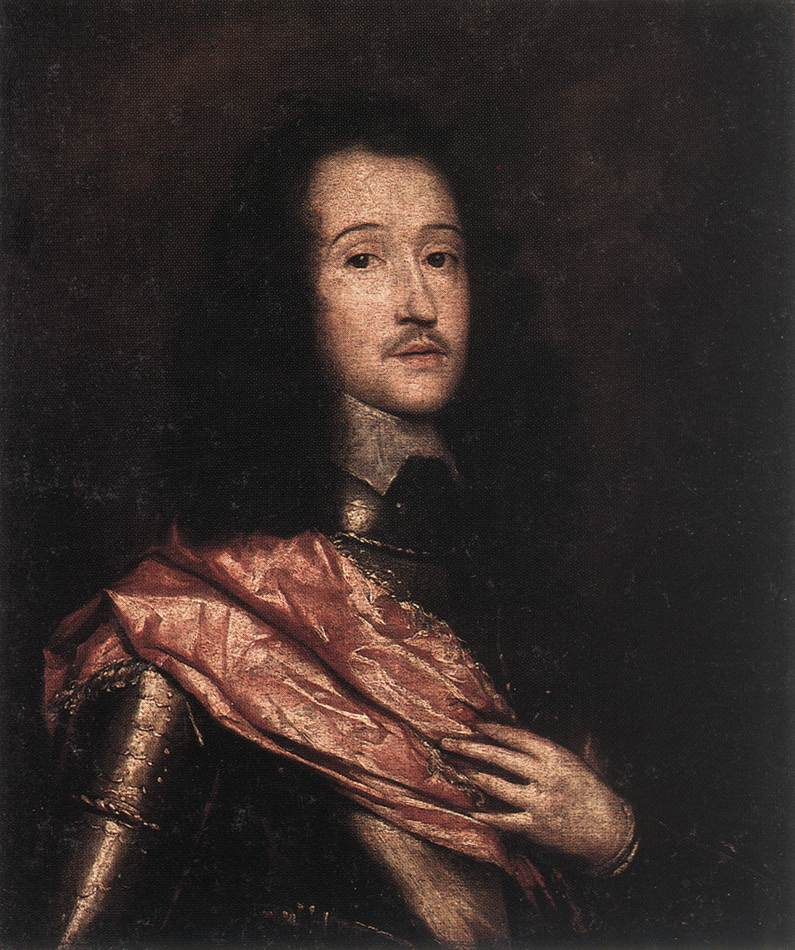
Richard Lovelace

=== January–March ===
- January 6 – Christoffer Gabel, Danish statesman (d. 1673)
- January 19 – Lucas Faydherbe, Belgian sculptor and architect (d. 1697)
- January 22 – Lodewijck Neefs, Flemish painter (d. 1649)
- January 23 – Ralph Josselin, English clergyman (d. 1683)
- January 30
  - Isaac de Porthau, Gascon black musketeer of the Maison du Roi (d. 1712)
  - William Sancroft, 79th Archbishop of Canterbury (d. 1693)
- February 5 – Jan Thomas van Ieperen, Flemish engraver, painter (d. 1673)
- February 22 – Robert Culliford, English politician (d. 1698)
- March 8 – Tito Livio Burattini, Italian inventor, Egyptologist, instrument-maker (d. 1681)
- March 17
  - David Ancillon, French Huguenot pastor and author (d. 1692)
  - Johann Georg Macasius, German physician (d. 1653)

=== April–June ===
- April 4 – Sir George Wharton, 1st Baronet, English baronet (d. 1681)
- April 20 – Sir John Goodricke, 1st Baronet, English landowner and politician (d. 1670)
- May 3 – Roger Pepys, English lawyer and politician (d. 1688)
- May 9 – Frederick, Landgrave of Hesse-Eschwege (d. 1655)
- May 23 – Elias Ashmole, English antiquarian (d. 1692)
- June 2 – Maeda Toshitsugu, Japanese daimyō of the early Edo period (d. 1674)
- June 13 – Sir Vincent Corbet, 1st Baronet, English politician (d. 1656)
- June 18 – George Evelyn, English politician (d. 1699)
- June 20 – Franciscus Bonae Spei, French Catholic scholastic theologian, philosopher (d. 1677)

=== July–September ===
- July 31 – Nicolás Antonio, Spanish bibliographer born in Seville (d. 1684)
- August 10 – Richard Ingoldsby, English politician (d. 1685)
- August 13 – Johannes Andreas Quenstedt, German theologian (d. 1688)
- August 25 – Frances Hyde, Countess of Clarendon, English noble (d. 1667)
- September 3 – Roshanara Begum, Mughal princess (d. 1671)
- September 13 – Margravine Louise Charlotte of Brandenburg, Duchess of Courland by marriage (1645–1676) (d. 1676)
- September 25 – Sir Francis Drake, 2nd Baronet, English Member of Parliament (d. 1662)
- September 29 – Lothar Friedrich von Metternich-Burscheid, Prince-Bishop of Speyer (1652–1675) (d. 1675)

=== October–December ===
- October 5 – Dorothy Spencer, Countess of Sunderland, English countess (d. 1684)
- October 10 – William Cavendish, 3rd Earl of Devonshire, English nobleman (d. 1684)
- October 12 – Sir Francis Gerard, 2nd Baronet, English Member of Parliament (d. 1680)
- October 17 – Dionisio Lazzari, Italian sculptor and architect (d. 1689)
- October 28
  - Cornelius Hazart, Dutch Jesuit priest, polemical author (d. 1690)
  - Antoine Garaby de La Luzerne, French poet (d. 1679)
- November 4 – Johannes Hoornbeek, Dutch theologian (d. 1666)
- November 6 – Leopoldo de' Medici, Italian Catholic cardinal (d. 1675)
- November 16 – Frederick VI, Margrave of Baden-Durlach (1659–1677) (d. 1677)
- November 19 – Eustache Le Sueur, French painter (d. 1655)
- December – Gerard ter Borch, Dutch painter (d. 1681)
- December 4 – Federico Visconti, Cardinal Archbishop of Milan (d. 1693)
- December 9 – Richard Lovelace, English poet (d. 1657)
- December 22 – Charles I Louis, Elector Palatine (d. 1680)
- December 23 – Magdalene Sibylle of Saxony, Crown Princess of Denmark (d. 1668)
- December 25 – Jean de Coligny-Saligny, French noble and army commander (d. 1686)

=== Date unknown ===
- Paolo Casati, Italian Jesuit mathematician (d. 1707)
- Lozang Gyatso, 5th Dalai Lama (d. 1682)

== Deaths ==
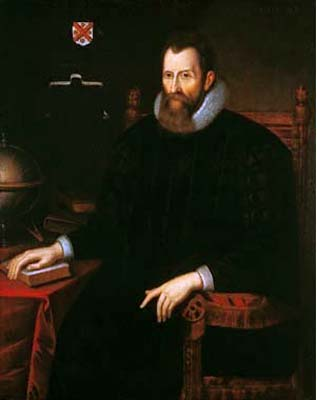
John Napier

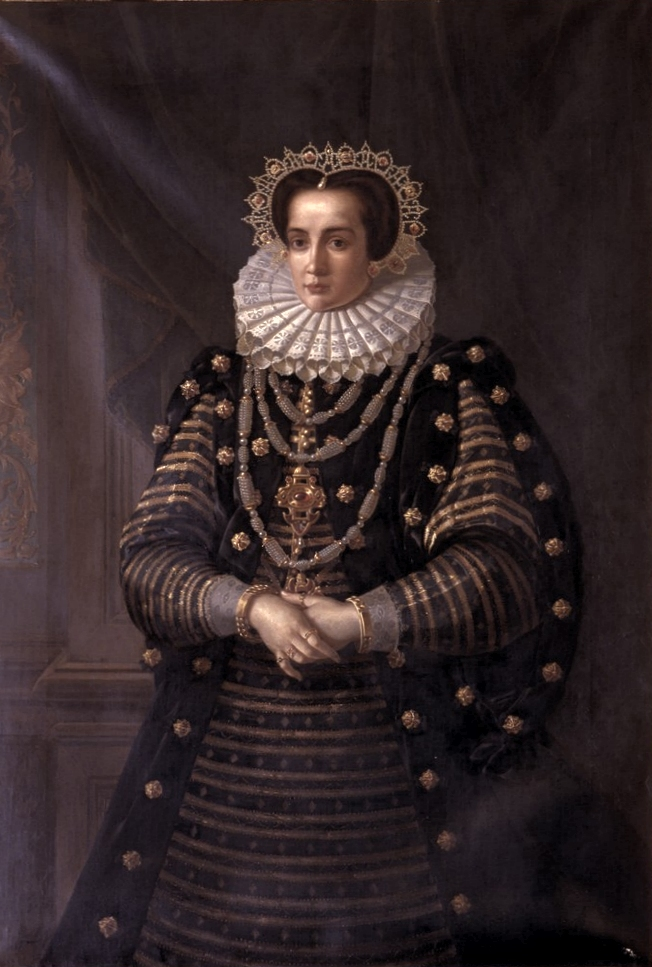
Dorothea Maria of Anhalt

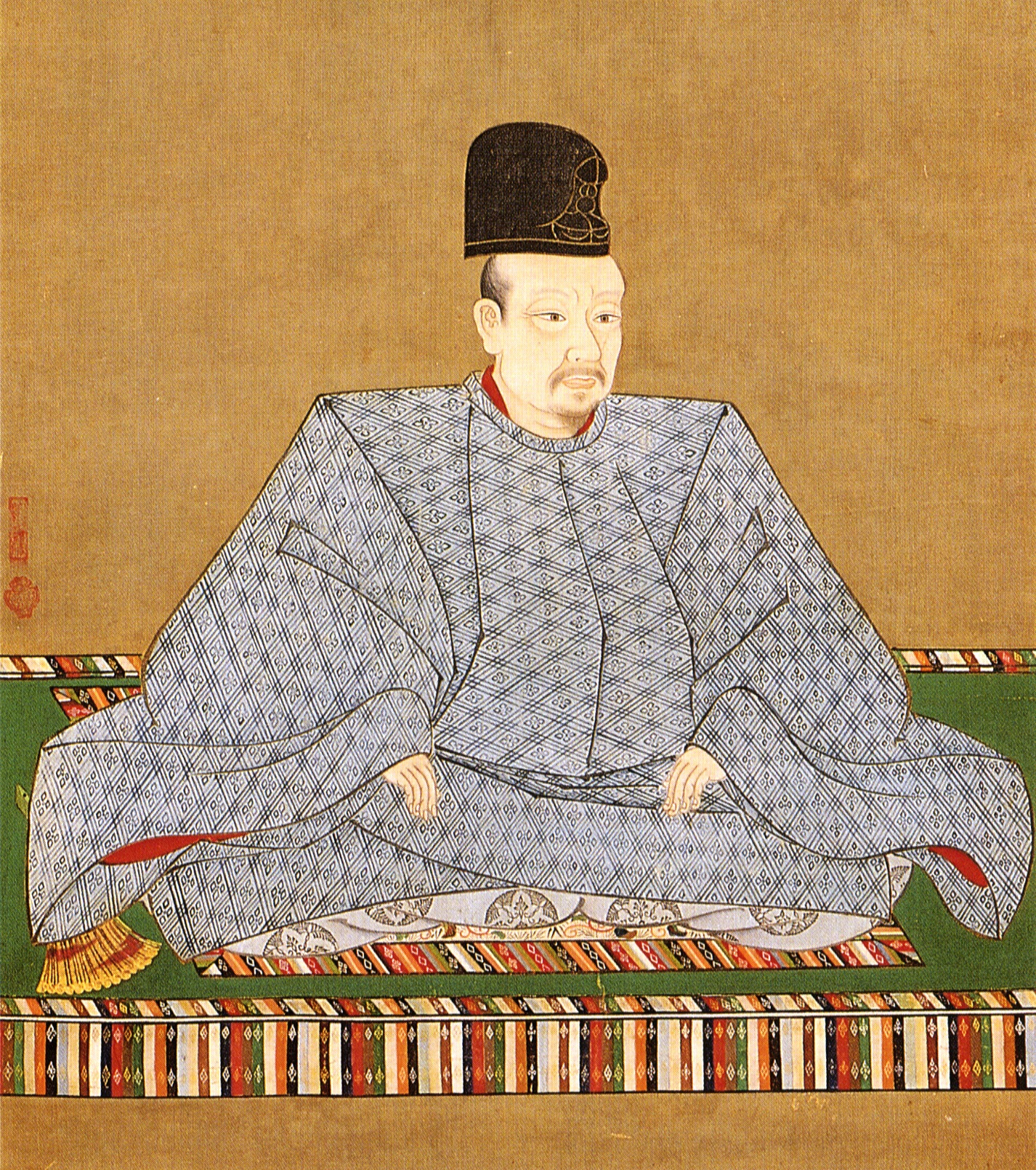
Emperor Go-Yozei

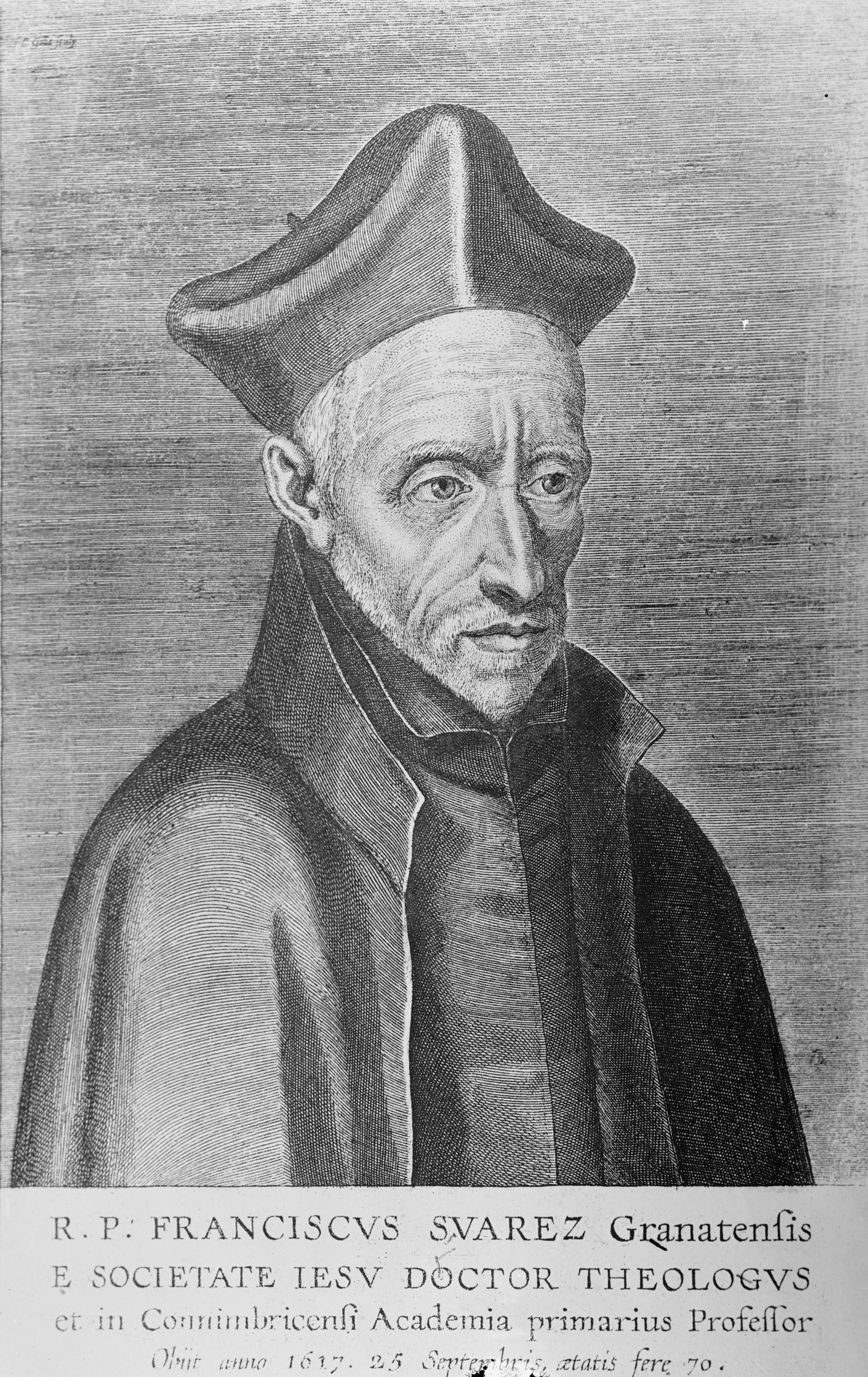
Saint Francisco Suarez

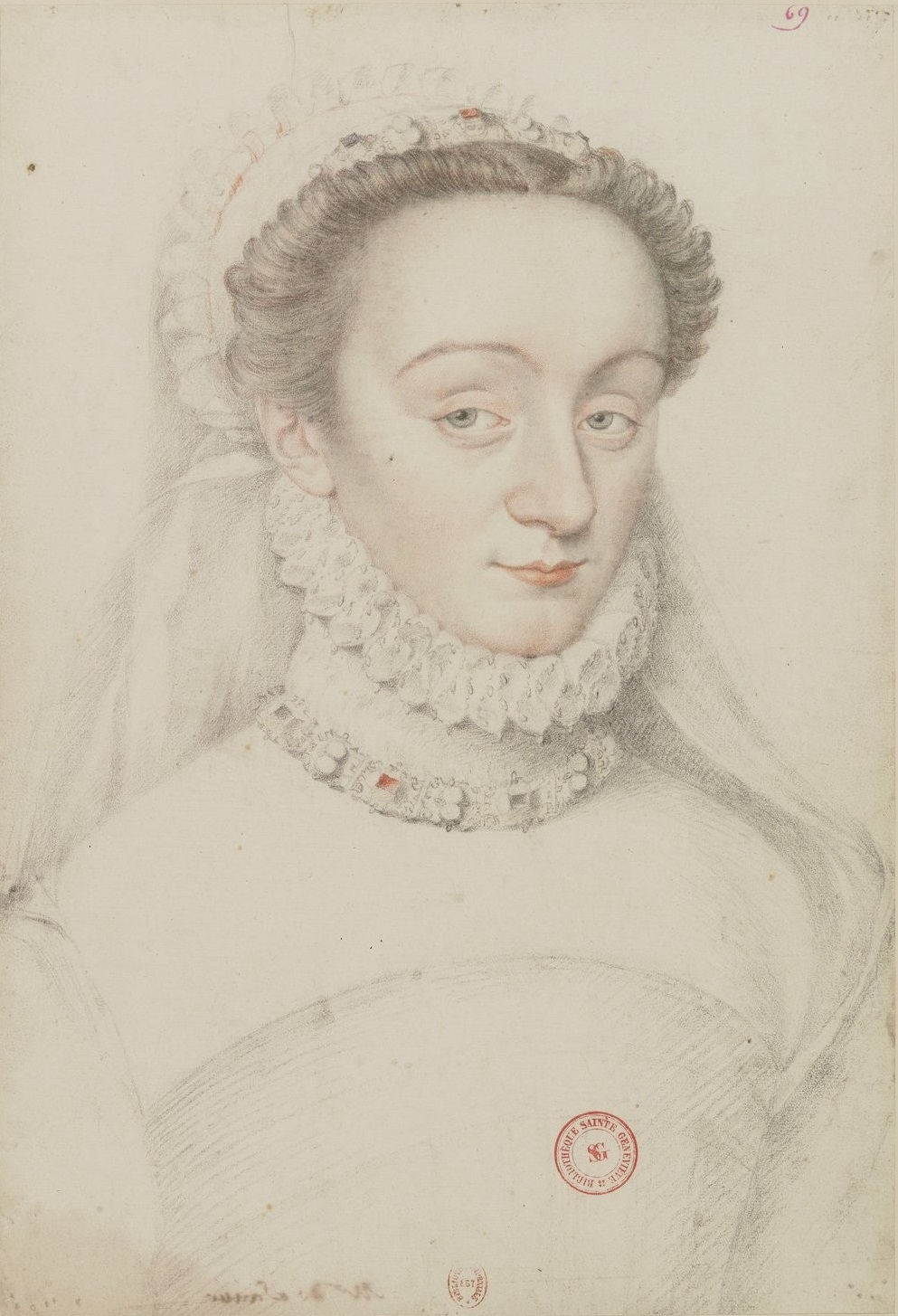
Charlotte de Sauve

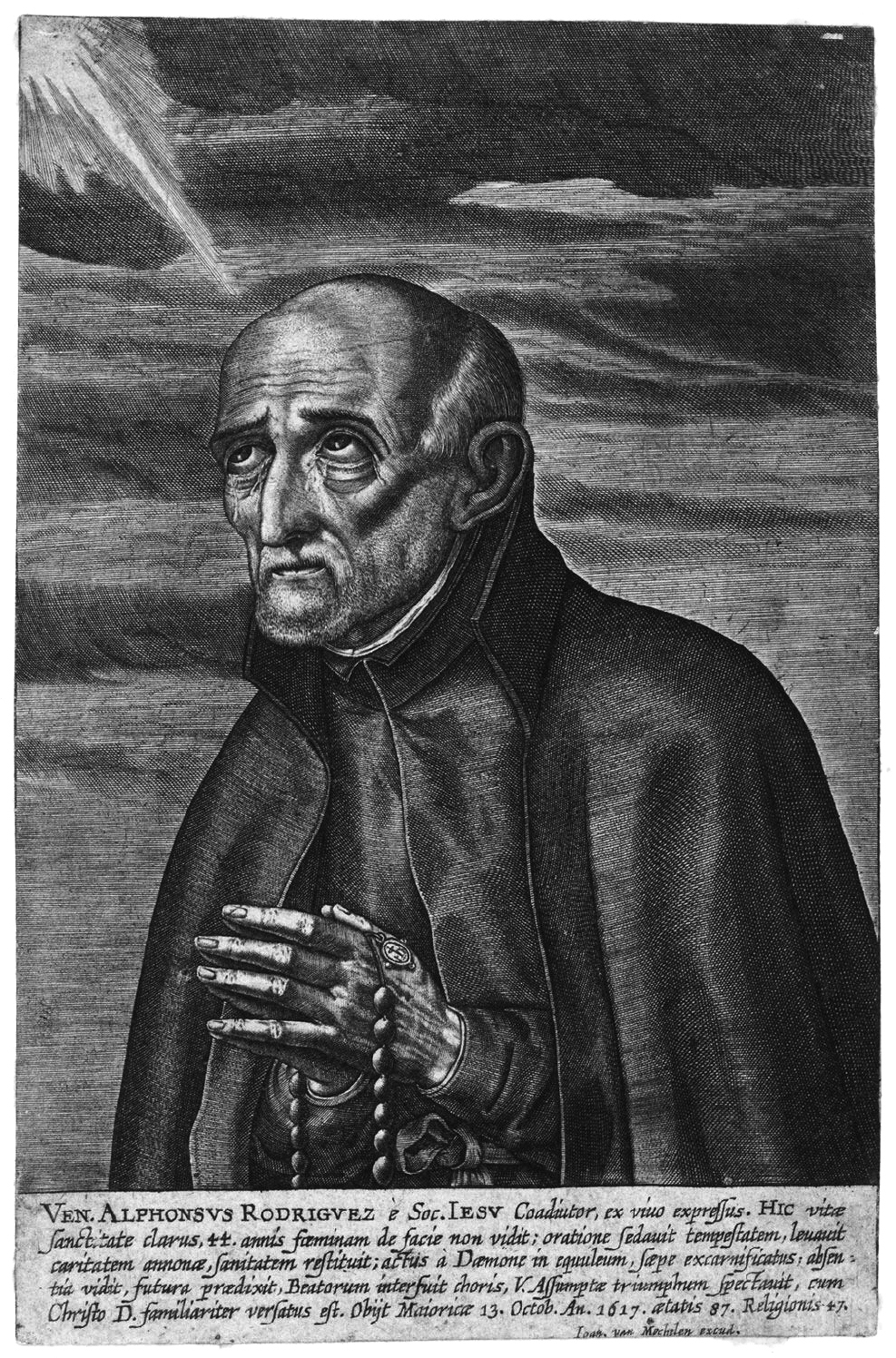
Alphonsus Rodriguez

=== January–March ===
- January 1 – Hendrik Goltzius, Dutch painter (b. 1558)
- January 6 – Dorothea of Denmark, Duchess of Brunswick-Lüneburg from 1561 to 1592 as the consort of Duke William (b. 1546)
- January 16 – Wolf Dietrich Raitenau, Prince-Archbishop of Salzburg (b. 1559)
- January 17 – Faust Vrančić, Croatian inventor (b. 1551)
- January 28 – Karl II, Duke of Münsterberg-Oels, Duke of Oels and Duke of Bernstadt (b. 1545)
- February 3 – Prospero Alpini, Italian physician and botanist from the Republic of Venice (b. 1553)
- February 8 – Edward Talbot, 8th Earl of Shrewsbury, English politician and earl (b. 1561)
- February 11 – Giovanni Antonio Magini, Italian mathematician, cartographer and astronomer (b. 1555)
- February 16 – Kaspar Ulenberg, German theologian (b. 1549)
- March 1 – Edward Hoby, English politician (b. 1560)
- March 20 – François d'Aguilon, Belgian Jesuit mathematician (b. 1567)
- March 21 – Pocahontas, Algonquian (Native American) princess (b. c. 1596)
- March 27 – George II, Duke of Pomerania, non-reigning Duke of Pomerania (b. 1582)

=== April–June ===
- April 1 – Ralph Eure, 3rd Baron Eure, English politician (b. 1558)
- April 4 – John Napier, Scottish mathematician (b. 1550)
- April 5 – Alonso Lobo, Spanish composer (b. 1555)
- May 3 – Aleixo de Menezes, Portuguese Catholic archbishop (b. 1559)
- May 7
  - David Fabricius, Frisian astronomer (b. 1564)
  - Jacques Auguste de Thou, French historian (b. 1553)
- May 11 – Jean Chapeauville, Belgian theologian and historian (b. 1551)
- May 16 – Nicolas de Montmorency (b. 1556)
- May 29 – Roger Owen, English politician (b. 1573)
- June 20 – Raja Wodeyar I, King of Mysore (b. 1552)
- June 27 – Jerome Xavier, Spanish Jesuit missionary (b. 1549)

=== July–September ===
- July 8 – Leonora Dori, French noble (b. 1571)
- July 9 – John Herbert, Welsh politician (b. 1550)
- July 13 – Adam Wenceslaus, Duke of Cieszyn, Duke of Teschen (b. 1574)
- July 18 – Dorothea Maria of Anhalt (b. 1570)
- August 7 – Otto, Landgrave of Hesse-Kassel, Hereditary Prince of Hesse-Kassel, Administrator of Hersfeld Abbey (b. 1594)
- August 8 – Frederick IV of Fürstenberg, German noble (b. 1563)
- August 13 – Johann Jakob Grynaeus, Swiss Protestant clergyman (b. 1540)
- August 24 – Rose of Lima, Peruvian saint (b. 1586)
- August 28 – William Willoughby, 3rd Baron Willoughby of Parham, English baron (b. 1584)
- September 9 – Julius Echter von Mespelbrunn, German bishop (b. 1545)
- September 25
  - Emperor Go-Yōzei of Japan (b. 1571)
  - Francisco Suárez, Spanish Jesuit priest (b. 1548)
- September 27 – John Ernest of Nassau-Siegen, German general (b. 1582)
- September 30 – Charlotte de Sauve, French courtesan (b. 1551)

=== October–December ===
- October 10 – Bernardino Baldi, Italian mathematician and writer (b. 1553)
- October 11 – François Vranck, Dutch statesman and justice (b. 1555)
- October 14 – Isaac Arnauld, French noble (b. 1566)
- October 19 – David Hoeschel, German librarian (b. 1556)
- October 22 – Matthias Hafenreffer, German Lutheran theologian (b. 1561)
- October 27 – Ralph Winwood, English politician (b. c. 1563)
- October 31 – Alphonsus Rodriguez, Spanish Jesuit lay brother, saint (b. 1532)
- November 10 – Barnabe Rich, English soldier and writer (b. c. 1540)
- November 12 – Nicolas de Neufville, seigneur de Villeroy, secretary of state under four kings of France (b. 1543)
- November 17 – Princess Dorothea, Abbess of Quedlinburg (b. 1591)
- November 22 – Ahmed I, Ottoman Emperor (b. 1590)

=== Date unknown ===
- Tarquinia Molza, Italian singer (b. 1542)
