= Immacolata Concezione, Vigevano =

Church in Vigevano, Italy

Coordinates: 45°20′52″N 8°50′57″E

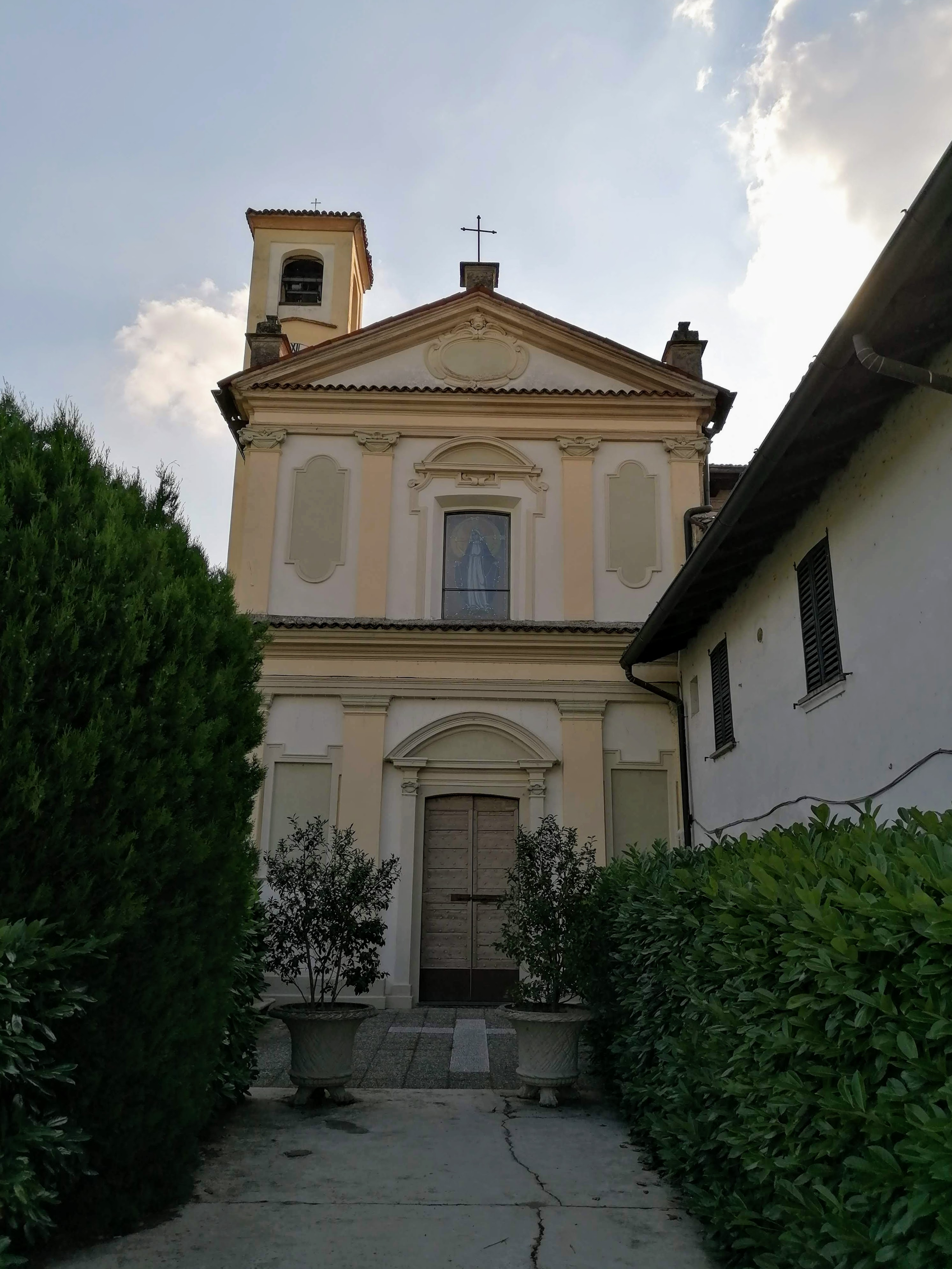
The church.

The Church of the Immaculate Conception is a religious building in Buccella, frazione of Vigevano, in province of Pavia, Lombardy, Italy, and the diocese of Vigevano.

== Description and history ==
The church of the Immaculate Conception was built in Buccella in 1692 at the behest of Count Giulio Calderara and, following bequests and donations, it was able to enrich itself until the "benefit" which, in 1714, transformed it into a chaplaincy.
