= Sant'Antonio Abate alla Morsella =

Coordinates: 45°16′53″N 8°48′49″E

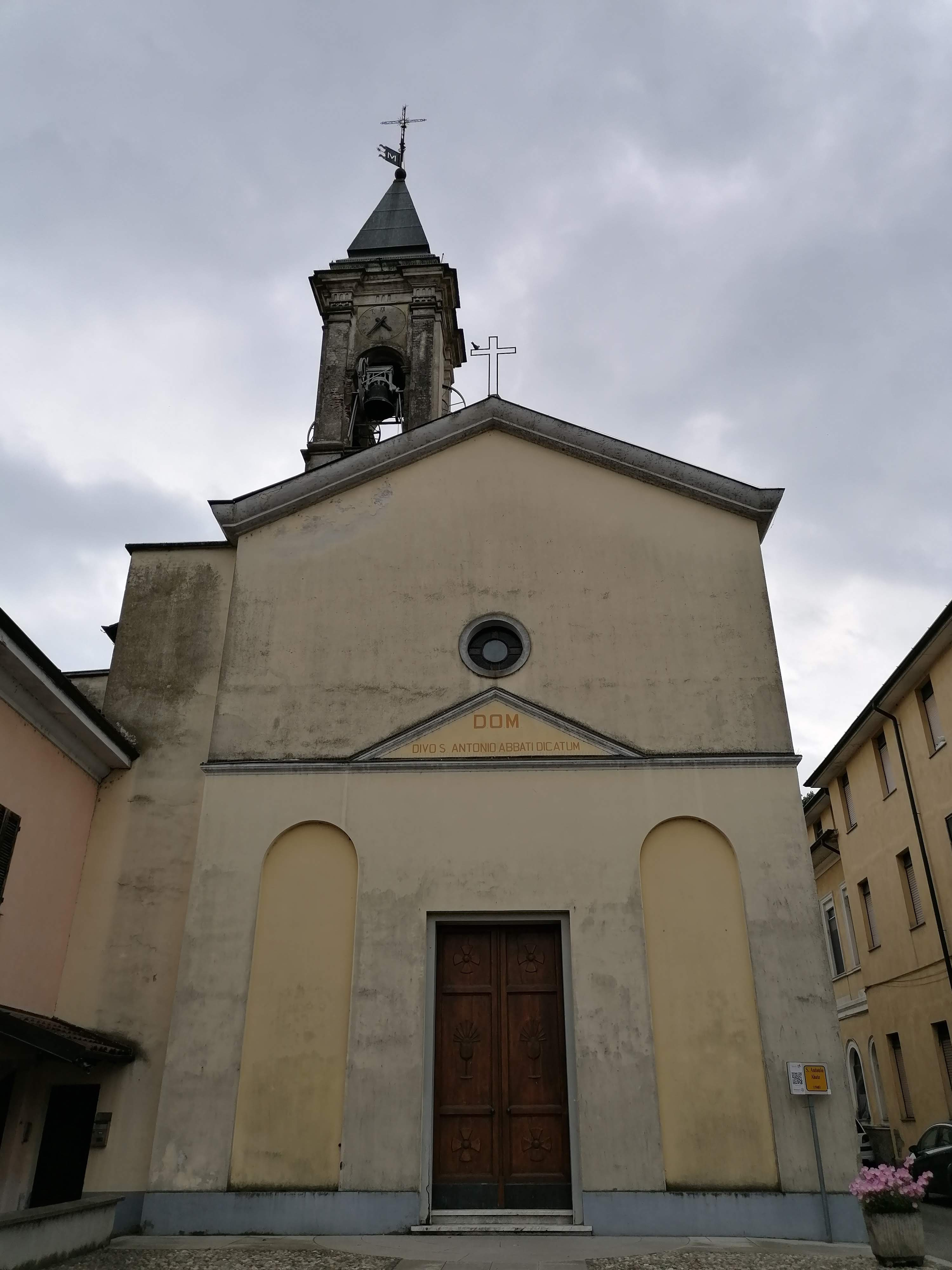
The church.

The Church of St. Anthony the Abbot in Morsella is a church in Morsella, frazione of Vigevano, in the province of Pavia and diocese of Vigevano, Italy; it is part of the urban vicariate.

== Description and story ==
The original church, built in 1692, was demolished and rebuilt in the 1940s: the current church only retains the bell tower.

The church is dedicated to Saint Anthony the Abbot, an Egyptian hermit considered the founder of Christian monasticism. It was consecrated on 25 August 1940 and was subjected to various restoration works in the following years which mainly involved the work on the facade.
