= Madonna di Pompei, Vigevano =

Coordinates: 45°18′52″N 8°51′04″E

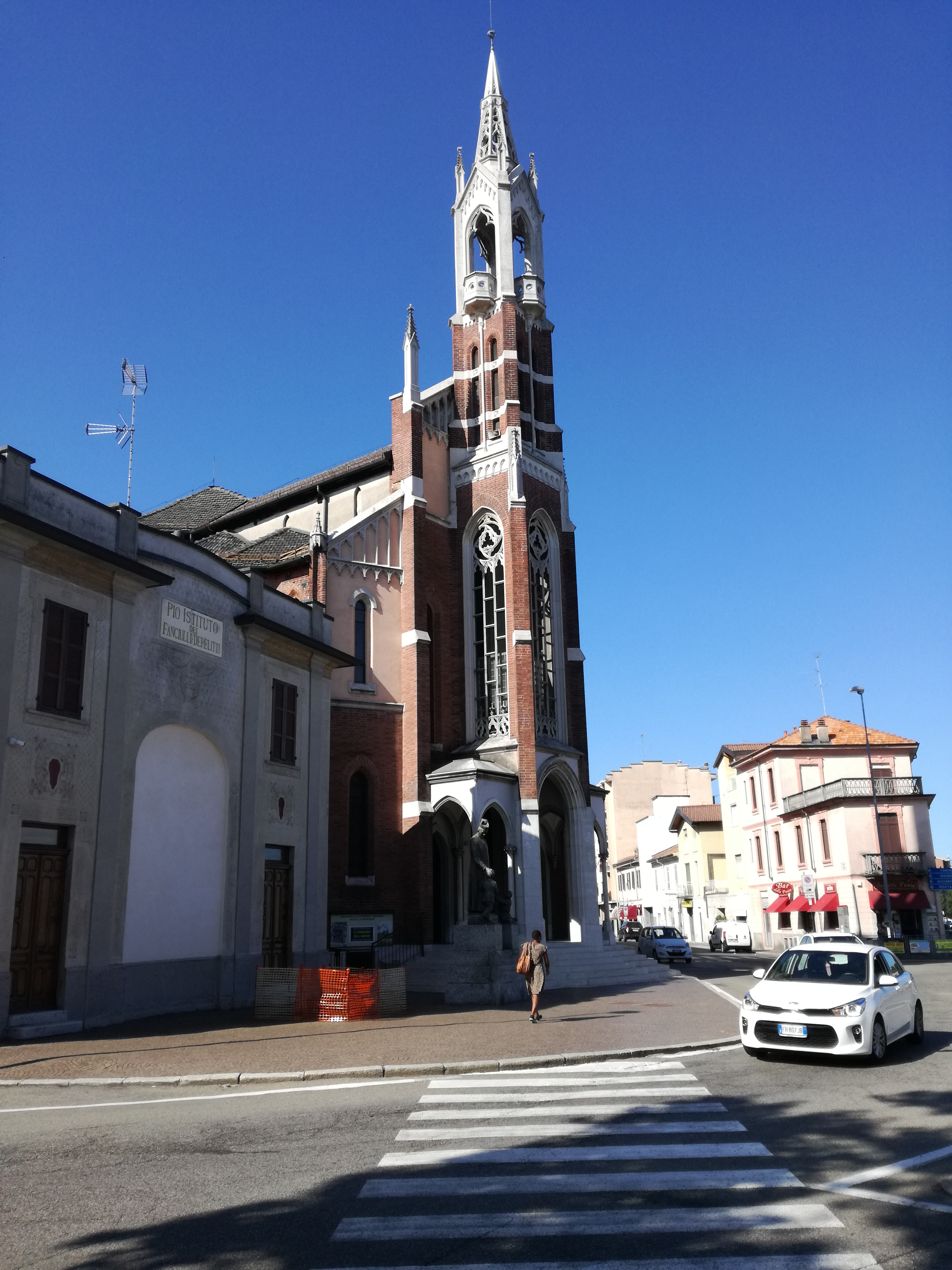
The church

The Church of Madonna di Pompei is a religious building located in Vigevano, in province of Pavia and diocese of Vigevano, Italy.

== Description and history ==
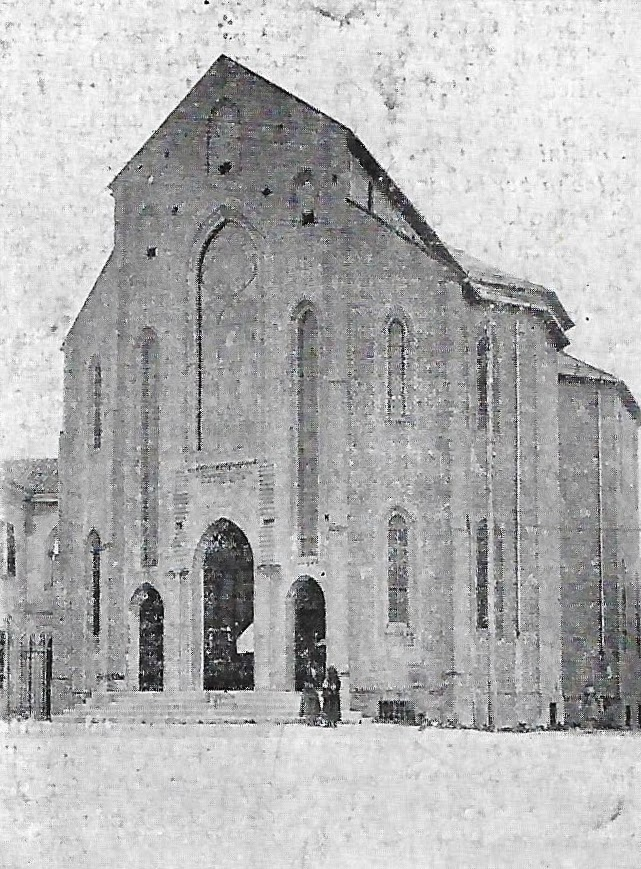
The church in 1930, before the radical interventions on the façade

The church-sanctuary of Madonna di Pompei stands on the west side of Piazza Volta. The devotion to the Madonna of Pompeii in Vigevano was started by Don Ambrogio Ceriotti on 8 May 1897, taking advantage of a large room used as a wood and lime warehouse in the then suburb of the fair, at the entrance to the road to Mortara. The humble original building, a much smaller church than the current one, was replaced by a new one whose first stone was laid on 6 June 1920. The current Sanctuary, large and imposing, with three naves, was built based on the design of engineer Spirito Maria Chiappetta from Milan, who later became a priest, and is the only one completed among all his works. The church was opened for worship on 30 April 1922, being still partly rustic and of unfinished construction. The completion of the façade was carried out by Mons. Carlo Dell'Orbo, based on a design by the same architect Mons. Chiappetta and inaugurated in this beautiful art form on the evening of 7 May 1940 with the blessing of the bishop Mons. Giovanni Bargiggia.

Don Ceriotti died in 1925, but as early as 1922 he had asked for and obtained collaboration with the church of the Somaschi Fathers; these remained there until the end of 1926 when they had to abandon Vigevano; Don Carlo Dell'Orbo was then appointed to take over the rectorship of the church and began his work in February 1927. He immediately got in touch with the architect Mons. Chiappetta, had all the cement from which the sanctuary was invaded and removed all the false constructions, and gave the desired design to the stairs, which constitute a distinctive element of the entrance.

Based on drawings by the Vigevano painters Luigi Bocca and Carlo and Casimiro Ottone, the internal decoration was created with images of the fifteen mysteries of the Rosary (mysteries of joy, pain and glory). The stained glass windows donated by benefactors and representing figures of saints appear there.

The consecration of the church (1 May 1931) coincided with the 15th centenary of the proclamation of the divine motherhood of the Most Holy Mary in the Council of Ephesus (431).

In the following years the original building underwent a heavy architectural intervention, which gave the exterior its current appearance. The façade of the original building was extensively modified, if not almost completely rebuilt, to the point of radically changing its appearance, in particular with the insertion, as the most evident element of the intervention, of a front bell tower which stands out directly in the center of the facade on the access stairs to the sanctuary.

Attached to the church was the Pio Istituto dei derelitti, now disappeared, opened on 24 December 1903, equipped with an active typography school. Finally, in the churchyard, in the center of a large niche on the façade, there is a bronze statue of Don Ceriotti, the work of the sculptor Secchi (1926).

The church was built on the ruins of an ancient church, once dedicated to San Rocco.
