= Immaculate Heart of Mary Church, Vigevano =

Church in Vigevano, Italy

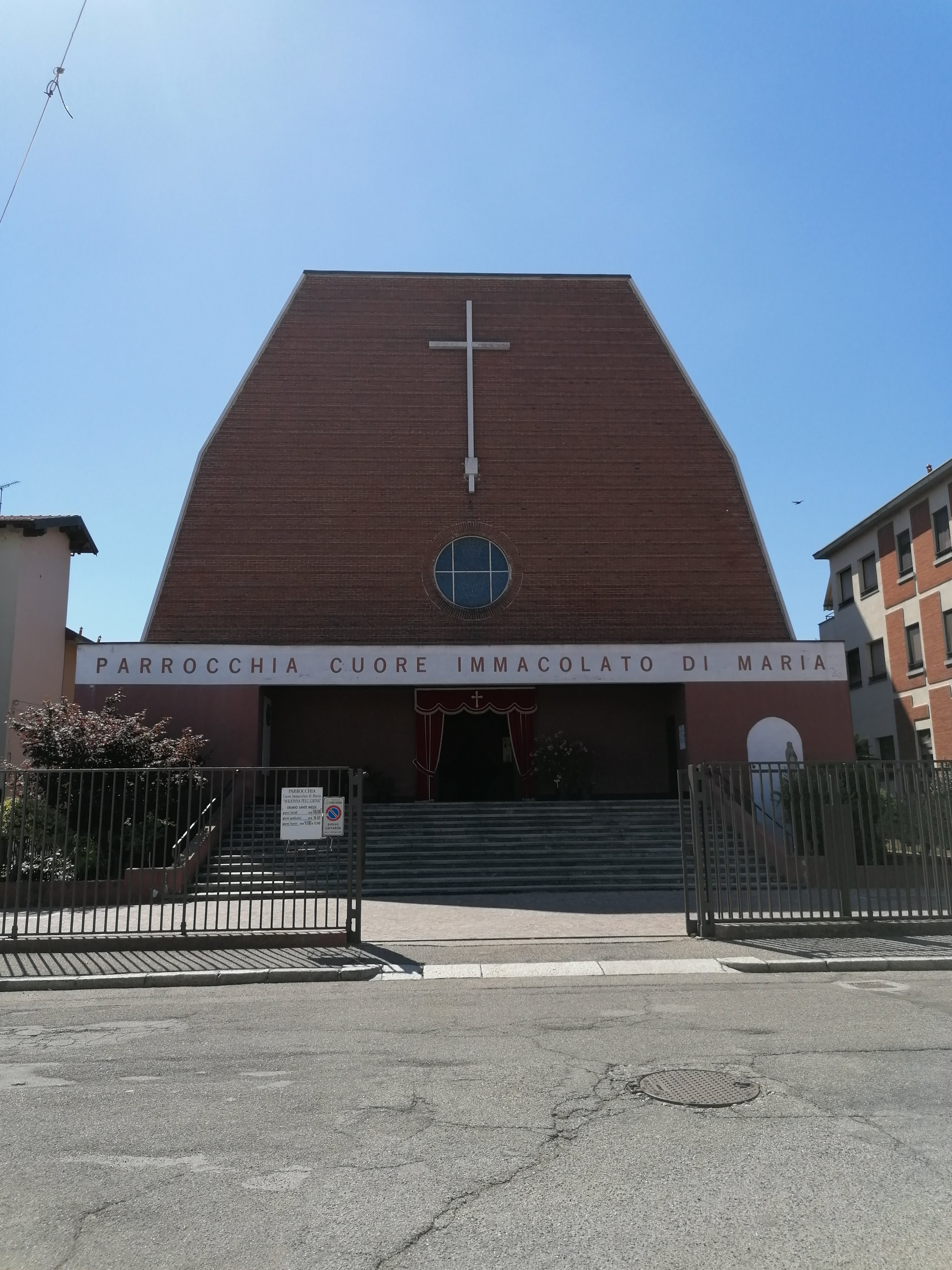
The Church of the Immaculate Heart of Mary in Vigevano.

The church of the Immaculate Heart of Mary is a religious building located in Vigevano, in province of Pavia and diocese of Vigevano.

== Description and story ==
Church completed in 1960, the work of the architect Vittorio Gallo of Turin, inside there are two ceramic panels placed on the sides of the main altar, depicting the Peregrinatio Mariae and the Vatican Council II; also noteworthy are the Stations of the Cross, painted by the Vigevano painter Carlo Zanoletti.

Father Giovanni Balduzzi, to whom the retirement home adjacent to the parish is dedicated, is buried under the altar.
