= Beata Vergine di Caravaggio =

Church in the province of Pavia, Italy

Coordinates: 45°16′53.83″N 8°50′13.20″E

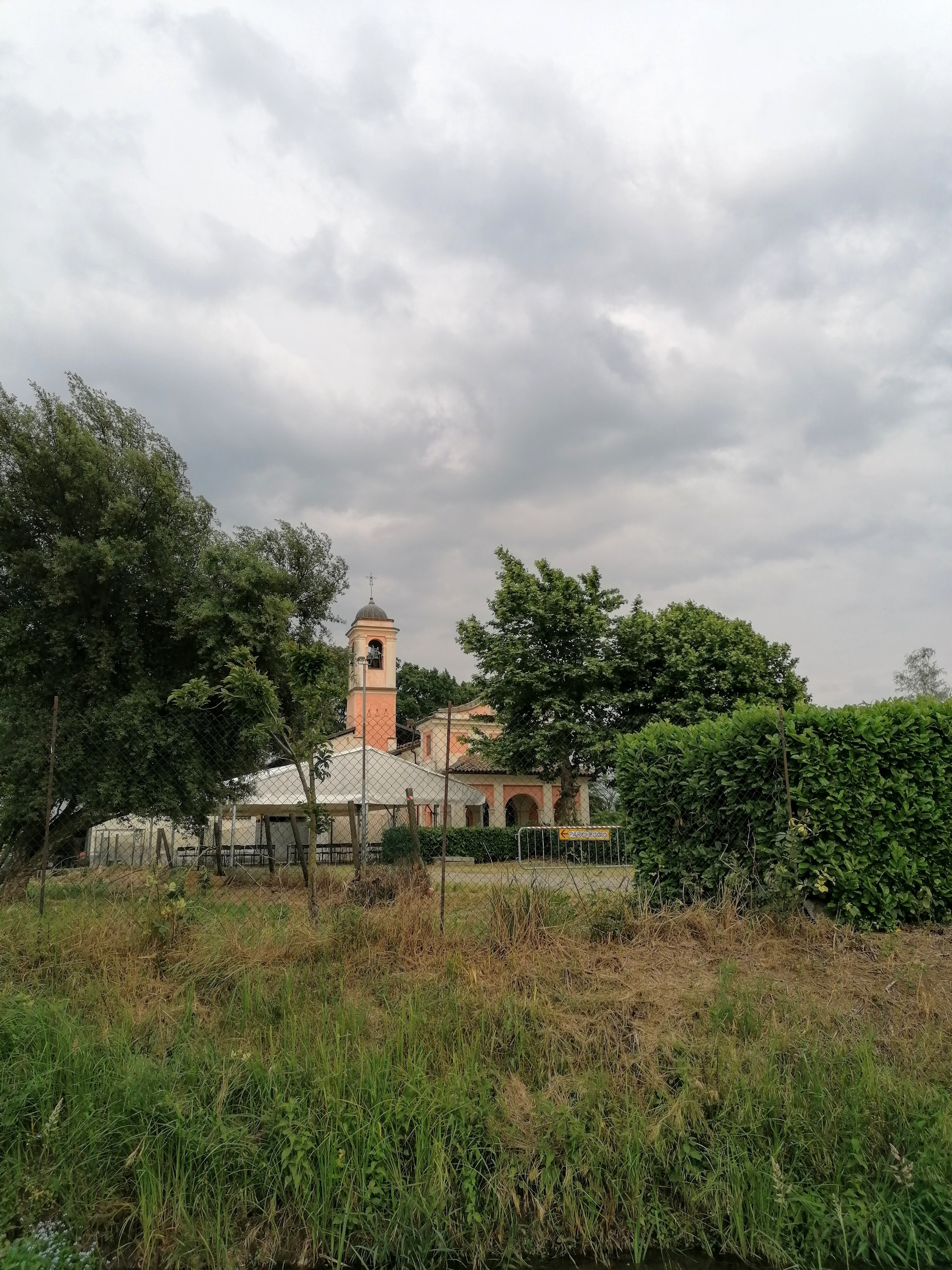
The church.

The church of the Blessed Virgin of Caravaggio is a religious building located in Fogliano Superiore, frazione of Vigevano, in province of Pavia and diocese of Vigevano.

== Description and history ==
The church remains the only notable monument of ancient Fogliano but its origin is unknown. In the early days it was known as the church of the Nativity of Mary or the church of Saint Mary of the Assumption: these names suggest that its foundation dates back to before 1000 and that it served as a parish church for lands mentioned in the Privilege of the emperor Henry IV of Franconia of 1064.

After countless vicissitudes, caused by dangers of imminent collapse, followed by improvements and moments of prestige, the church has preserved the lines of the Deomini intervention (1818-1824), extended and enriched with a façade and pronaos. With the breaking down of the side walls, in the 19th century, the altar of the Sacred Heart was created on the left, with the fresco by Emilio Galli; and in front, the chapel of the Blessed Virgin, with wooden statues. The vault, frescoed after the Second World War, is full of garlands of festooned flowers, medallions of the Evangelists and symbols of theological virtues. Also of considerable artistic interest are the large baroque statue of Saint Anne, in the niche, the canvas of the Annunciation, of Saint Lucia and a Deposition.

The church is privately owned and fenced, therefore not accessible.
