= Santa Maria del Carmine, Vigevano =

Coordinates: 45°18′46″N 8°51′29″E

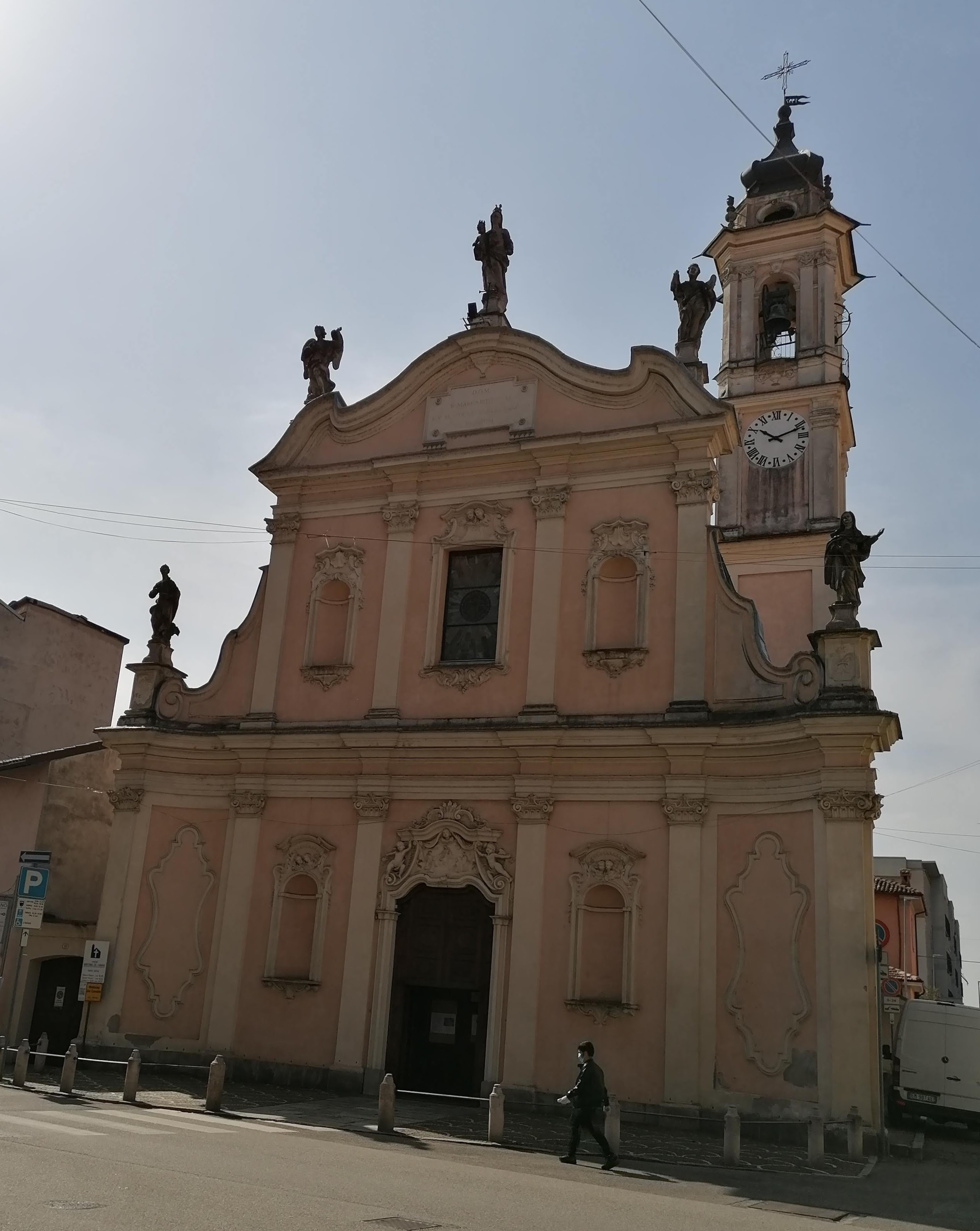
The church.

The Church of Santa Maria del Carmine or Church of Madonna del Carmine or more simply Church of Carmine is a religious building located in Vigevano, in province of Pavia and diocese of Vigevano, Italy.

== Description and history ==
The church, built in 1602 by the Carmen brotherhood, from which it takes its name, takes the place of another church, preceding and destroyed with Ludovico il Moro. Of this remains a 1400s fresco depicting the Virgin, now displayed on an altar.

The various chapels date back to the seventeenth century. The main altar, from the eighteenth century in polychrome marble, contains a wooden statue of the Madonna. Placed in 1630 between the pillars, there are twelve life-size statues representing the Apostles. In the central nave there is the large fresco of the Apparition of the Virgin to St. Simone Stock, general of the Carmelites, created by the nineteenth-century painter from Vigevano Giovanni Battista Garberini.

The façade dates back to 1732. It is full of movement and variation of volumes, with a division marked by six fake pillars in the form of pilasters with niches framed by frames. The bell tower, however, was built in various phases and finished only in the eighteenth century.
