= San Bernardo, Vigevano =

Coordinates: 45.3189°N 8.8535°E

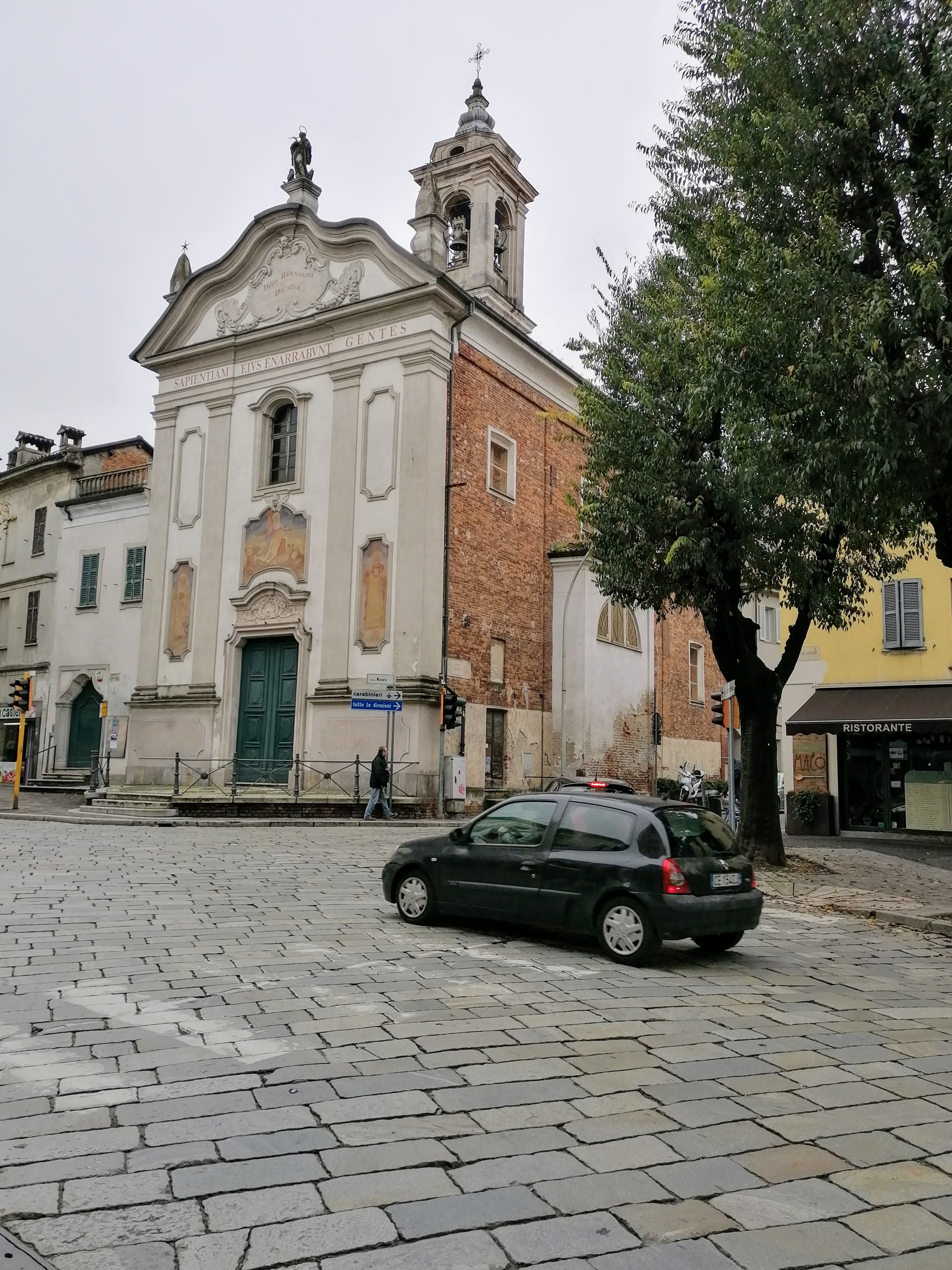
The church

The Church of San Bernardo is a religious building located in Vigevano, in the province of Pavia and diocese of Vigevano, Italy.

== Description and history ==
The first church dedicated to Bernard of Clairvaux, dating back to an unknown date, was outside the city walls and was demolished at the behest of Ludovico il Moro in 1498, for the construction of new fortifications. A few years later, according to Simone dal Pozzo, was rebuilt in its current location. It was enlarged for the first time in 1575 and then in 1672, adopting its new structure. The choir was built in 1576.

Also in 1672, the base was built higher than the road and the gallows for public executions were added to the side; the latter will then be moved to the disappeared church of Santa Giuliana.

The façade dates back to 1908, designed by Galliani and painted by Francesco Mazzucchi in 1960. The altar however dates back to the Seventeenth century and is in polychrome marble. Finally, in the side chapel on the left it is possible to find a fresco representing the Three Kings, the only one in the entire Diocese.
