= Santa Maria del Parto, Vigevano =

Church in Vigevano, Italy

Coordinates: 45°19′28″N 8°50′09″E

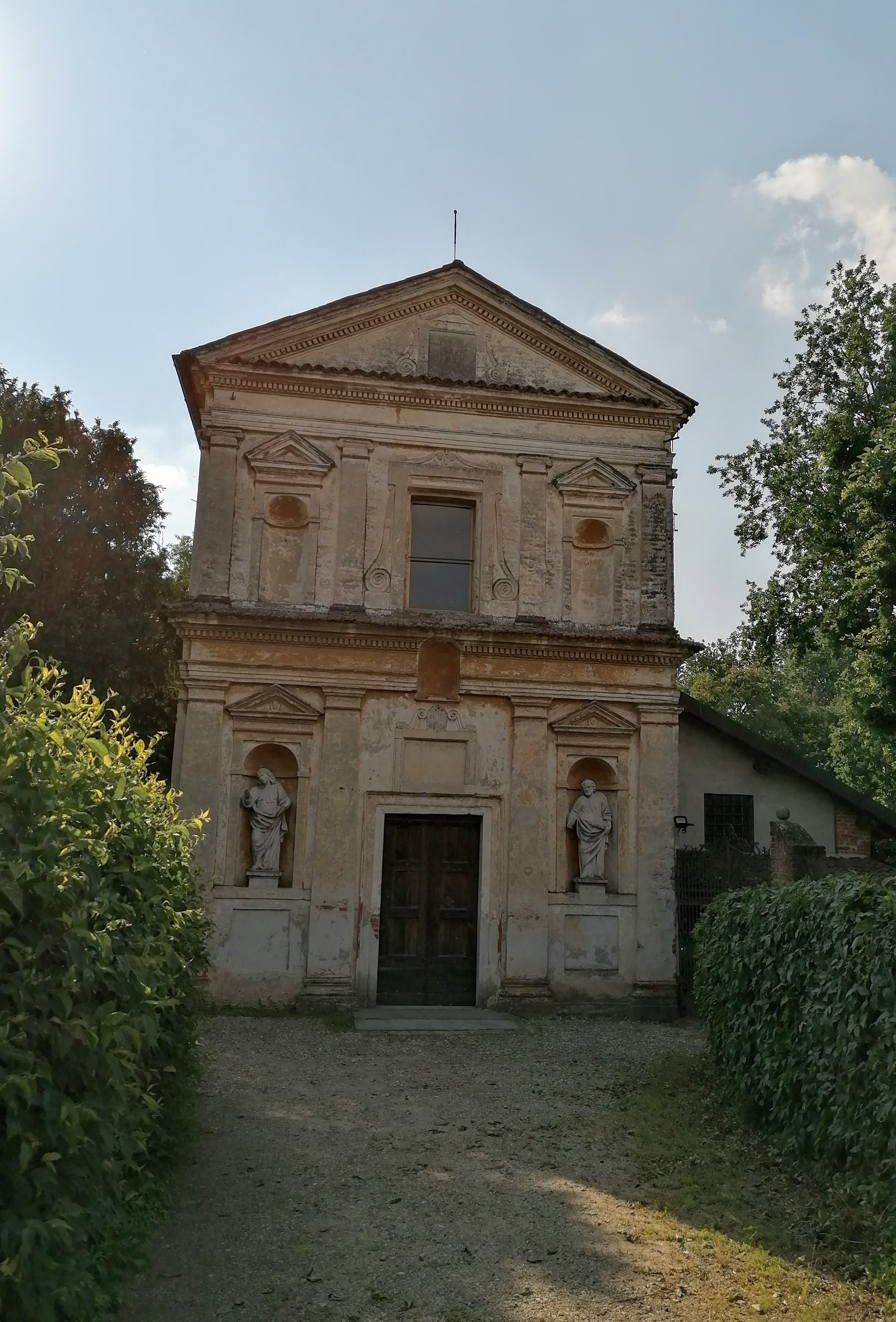
Santa Maria del Parto in 2020

The Church of Santa Maria del Parto, popularly known as the Church of Battù, is a religious building located in Vigevano, in province of Pavia and diocese of Vigevano, Italy.

== History ==
The church was built thanks to the legacy of Marco Antonio Cassolio Gatta. The archives preserve a deed of alienation from 1875 to a certain Cavalier Motta which then became the property of the Dulio family.

== Description ==
The building has a façade divided into two orders by a stringcourse frame, and culminating with the triangular tympanum. The lower part has a portal with stone frames in the central part and two statues on the sides in two niches. In ancient times, in place of this church, there was another building of worship, called del Conte, as it was built by count Nicolò Trivulzio, and dedicated to the Beata Vergine del Parto; however, the people corrupted the name into Beata Vergine di Battù. According to other hypotheses, the name could derive from the Battuti brotherhood, or from the fact that the area in which the church stands was particularly subject to wind and weather.

The single nave interior preserves the sixteenth century fresco of the Lombard school, coming from the ancient pre-existing church, depicting the Madonna and Child placed as altarpiece on the side altar dedicated to her. The presbytery presents in the apse the lunette with the eighteenth century fresco depicting Christ praying in the garden of olive trees.
