= Francisco Romero (bishop) =

Roman Catholic bishop (died 1635)

Most Reverend Francisco Romero
- Archbishop (Personal Title) of Vigevano
- Church: Catholic Church
- Diocese: Diocese of Vigevano
- In office: 1621–1635
- Predecessor: Pietro Giorgio Odescalchi
- Successor: Juan Gutiérrez (bishop)
- Previous post: Archbishop of Lanciano (1618–1621)

Orders
- Ordination: 30 September 1607
- Consecration: 20 May 1618 by Giovanni Garzia Mellini

Personal details
- Died: 16 July 1635 Vigevano, Italy

Francisco Romero (died 16 July 1635) was a Roman Catholic prelate who served as Archbishop (Personal Title) of Vigevano (1621–1635) and Archbishop of Lanciano (1618–1621).

== Biography ==
On 30 September 1607, Francisco Romero was ordained in the Order of the Brothers of the Blessed Virgin Mary of Mount Carmel. On 14 May 1618, he was appointed by Pope Paul V as Archbishop of Lanciano. On 20 May 1618, he was consecrated bishop by Giovanni Garzia Mellini, Cardinal-Priest of Santi Quattro Coronati, with Paolo De Curtis, Bishop Emeritus of Isernia, and Giovanni Battista Lancellotti, Bishop of Nola, serving as co-consecrators. On 11 January 1621, he was appointed during the papacy of Pope Gregory XV as Archbishop (Personal Title) of Vigevano. He served as Archbishop of Vigevano until his death on 16 July 1635.

Catholic Church titles
Preceded by Lorenzo Monzonís Galatina	Archbishop of Lanciano; 1618–1621	Succeeded by Andrea Gervasi
Preceded by Pietro Giorgio Odescalchi	Archbishop (Personal Title) of Vigevano; 1621–1635	Succeeded by Juan Gutiérrez (bishop)
