= San Dionigi, Vigevano =

Religious building in Pavia province, Italy

Coordinates: 45°19′06.5″N 8°51′30.6″E

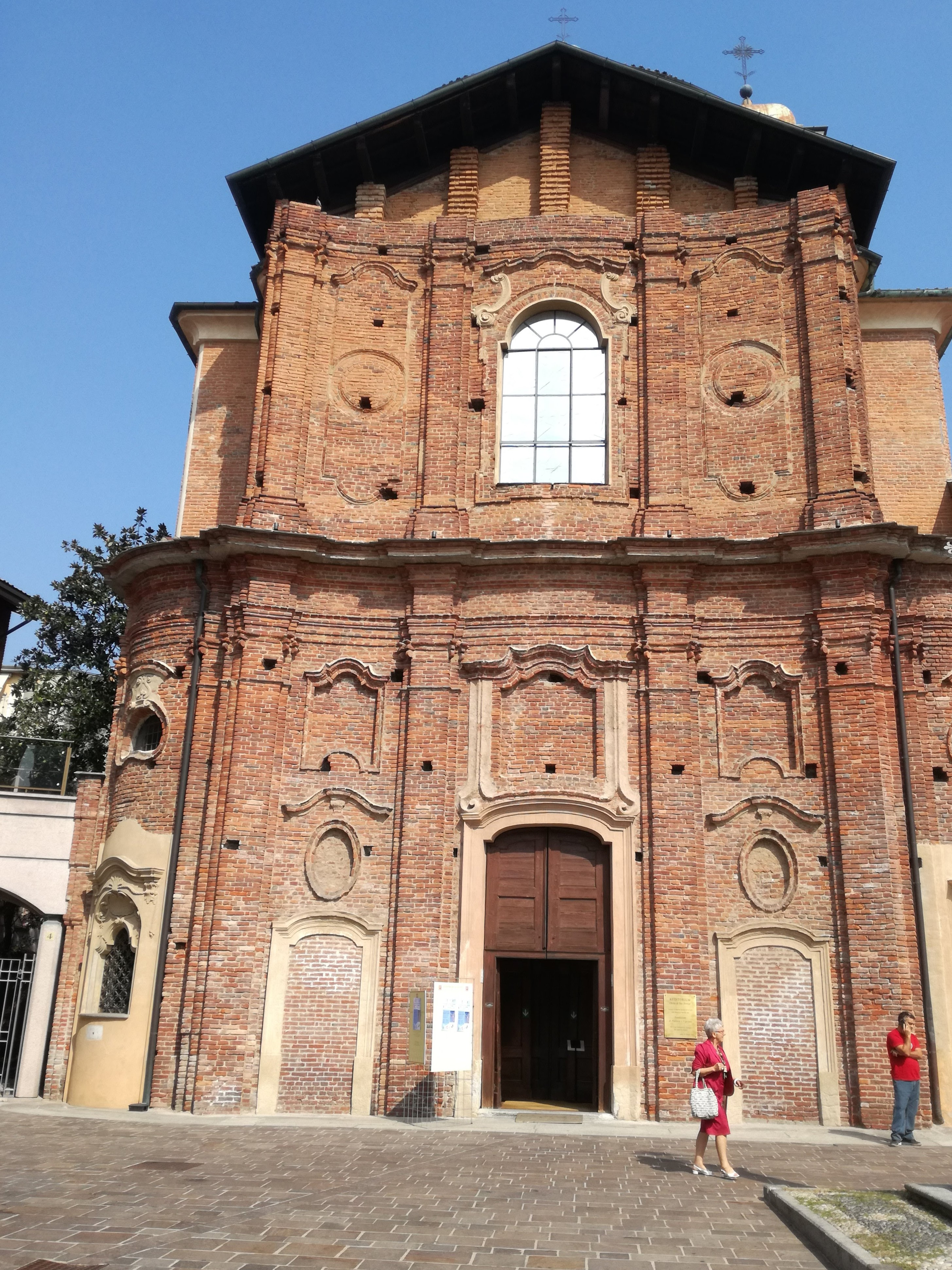
The church.

The church of San Dionigi is a religious building located in Vigevano, in province of Pavia and diocese of Vigevano, deconsecrated and since 2009 used as an auditorium.

== History ==
It is documented that, before the current building, there was a church of the same name on the site in 1323, probably built before the year 1000, but no trace remains about this: in a will of that year there is in fact mention of a frater Bregundius de Gravelona rector el minister ordinis fratrum paupertatis S. Dionysii de Vigievano. This church was also called the "House of Alms".

Another church was created on the first building, traces of which date back to the mid-fifteenth century. The construction of the new building began in 1750, the dome was built in 1780 and half a century later the bell tower was renovated. Finally, between 2007 and 2009, the building underwent a very radical restoration and the church was transformed into an auditorium.

== Description ==
Located in Piazza Martiri della Liberazione, the church of San Dionigi is a building in baroque style with very ancient origins; the façade is attributed to the architect Giovanni Ruggeri. There are five altars in the building: the main one, with variegated and polychrome marbles, is placed in the centre. The floor at the entrance is made up of a granite slab that covers the tomb of the executed, which also explains the dedication of the church: in fact, there was a congregation of the same name that took care of the burials of those condemned to death.
