= Juan Gutiérrez (bishop) =

Most Reverend Juan Gutiérrez
- Bishop of Vigevano
- Church: Catholic Church
- Diocese: Diocese of Vigevano
- In office: 1646–1649
- Predecessor: Francisco Romero (bishop)
- Successor: Gabriel Adarzo de Santander y Martínez de Viaín

Orders
- Consecration: 1 June 1648 by Alfonso de la Cueva-Benavides y Mendoza-Carrillo

Personal details
- Born: 1578 Cordoba, Spain
- Died: 20 March 1649 (age 71) Vigevano, Italy

Juan Gutiérrez (1578 – 20 March 1649) was a Catholic prelate who served as Bishop of Vigevano (1646–1649).

== Biography ==
Juan Gutiérrez was born in Cordoba, Spain. On 25 June 1646, Juan Gutiérrez was selected as Bishop of Vigevano and confirmed by Pope Innocent X on 18 May 1648. On 1 June 1648, he was consecrated bishop by Alfonso de la Cueva-Benavides y Mendoza-Carrillo, Cardinal-Bishop of Palestrina, with Giovanni Battista Scanaroli, Titular Bishop of Sidon, and Stefano Martini, Bishop of Noli, serving as co-consecrators. He served as Bishop of Vigevano until his death on 20 March 1649.

== External links and additional sources ==
- Cheney, David M. "Diocese of Vigevano". Catholic-Hierarchy.org. (for Chronology of Bishops) ^{[self-published]}
- Chow, Gabriel. "Diocese of Vigevano". GCatholic.org. (for Chronology of Bishops) ^{[self-published]}

Catholic Church titles
Preceded by Francisco Romero (bishop)	Bishop of Vigevano; 1646–1649	Succeeded by Gabriel Adarzo de Santander y Martínez de Viaín
