= Franciscus Bonae Spei =

Franciscus Bonae Spei (20 June 1617 — 5 January 1677) was a Catholic scholastic theologian and philosopher.

He was born in Lille under the name of François Crespin, and entered the Carmelite order (Ancient Observance) in 1635 under the religious name of Franciscus Bonae Spei (Brother Francis of Good Hope). During many years, he taught philosophy and theology in Leuven. He also held numerous charges within his order: he was Provincial, traveled three times to Rome and twice to Madrid, and died as prior of the Carmelite convent in Brussels. He wrote two vast philosophy and theology courses, of high quality. As all reformed Carmelites, he follows broadly the doctrine of Thomism, but discussed numerous contemporary issues. An important philosophical dispute has opposed him to the Spanish Cistercian Juan Caramuel y Lobkowitz. He died in Brussels, aged 59.

== Printed Works ==
- Commentarii tres in universam Aristotelis philosophiam, Brussels, 1652.
- Noctua belgica ad aquilam Germanicam Caramuelis qua illius ... quaestio de circumstantijs aggravantibus, ac praecipua ejusdem theologiae fundamentalis puncta, fundamentaliter discutiuntur & resolvuntur, Louvain, Typis Cypriani Coenestenii, 1657.
- Commentarii tres in universam theologiam scolasticam, Antwerp, 1667.
- Historico-theologicum carmeli armamentarium, Antwerp, apud Marcellum Parys, 1669
- Historico-theologicum carmeli armamentarium, Cologne, Typis Petri Alstorff, 1677.
