= Juan Caramuel y Lobkowitz =

Spanish philosopher, writer, mathematician and Catholic clergyman (1606–1682)

Most Reverend Juan Caramuel y Lobkowitz
- Bishop of Vigevano
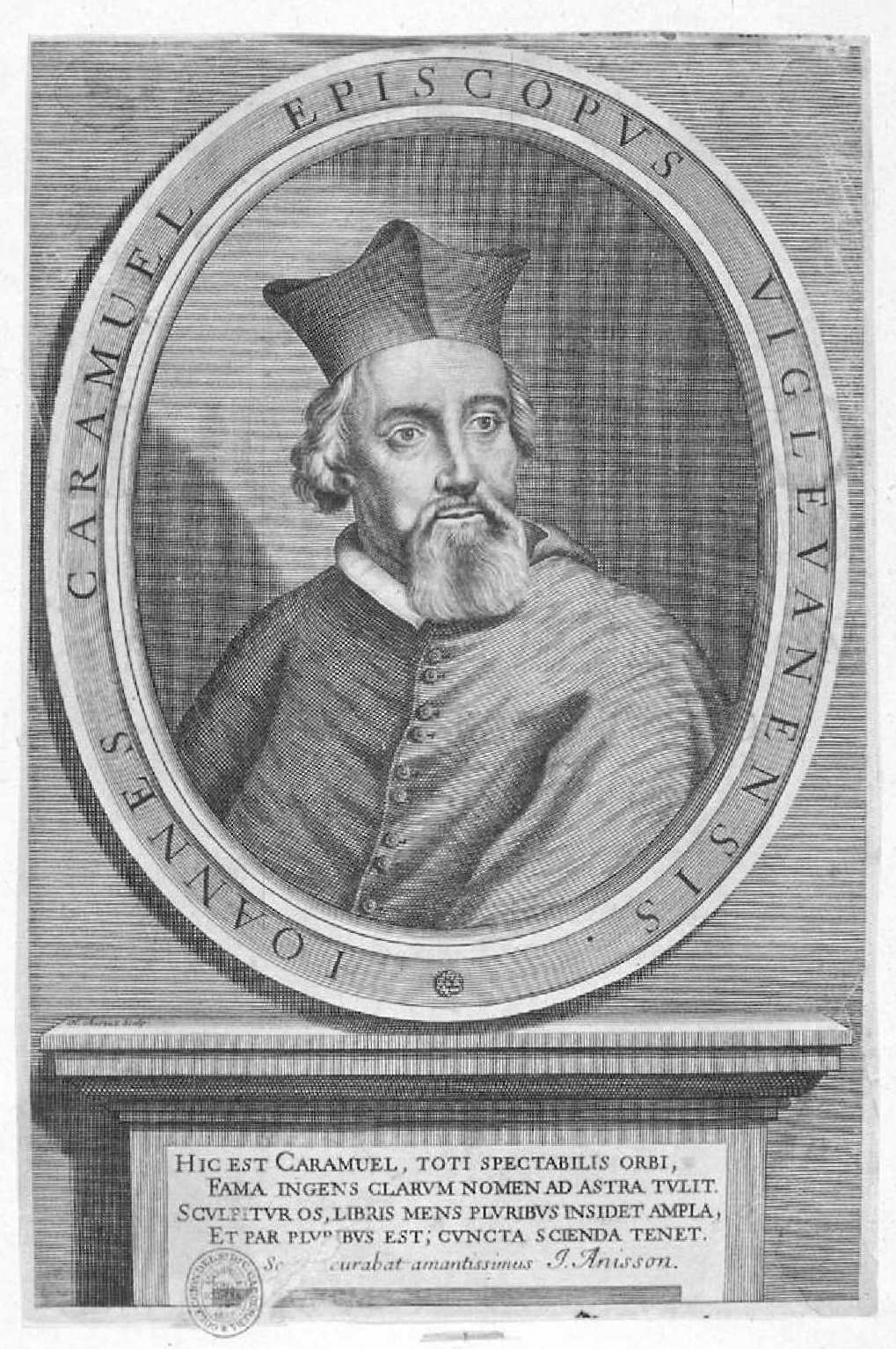
- Church: Catholic Church
- Diocese: Vigevano (1673–1682); Campagna and Satrianum (1657–1673)
- Successor: Ferdinando de Rojas
- Previous posts: Grand-Vicar to the Archbishop of Prague

Education
- Education: University of Alcalá; University of Salamanca; Old University of Leuven (Ph.D., 1629; Th.D., 1638)

Philosophical work
- Era: 17th-century philosophy
- Region: Western philosophy; Spanish philosophy
- School: Aristotelianism; Scholasticism; Probabilism
- Institutions: University of Salamanca; Old University of Leuven
- Main interests: Metaphysics, moral philosophy, mathematics, astronomy
- Notable ideas: Binary mathematics; Cologarithm

Orders
- Consecration: 29 July 1567 by Cardinal Francesco Brancaccio

Personal details
- Born: 23 May 1606 Madrid, Spain
- Died: 8 September 1682 (aged 76) Vigevano, Italy
- Occupation: Mathematician and theologian

Juan Caramuel y Lobkowitz OCist (Juan Caramuel de Lobkowitz, 23 May 1606 in Madrid — 7 or 8 September 1682 in Vigevano) was a Spanish Catholic scholastic philosopher, ecclesiastic, mathematician, polyglot, and writer. He is believed to be a great-grandson of Jan Popel y Lobkowicz.

== Life ==
=== Early life and education ===
Juan Caramuel was born in Madrid on 23 May 1606. His father, Lorenzo Caramuel de Lobkowitz, was descended from a noble Czech / Bohemian family; his mother, Catarina Frisse, was related to the Danish royal family. He was instructed in oriental languages by Archbishop Juan de Esron (Ezron). By the age of 17, he was studying at the University of Alcalá de Henares, where he took his degree in the humanities and philosophy. His theological teachers at the University of Alcalá included the Dominicans John of St. Thomas (João Poinsot, 1589–1644) and Francisco de Araujo (1580–1664) as well as the Cistercian Pedro de Lorca (1521–1621).

He was a precocious child, early delving into serious problems in mathematics and even publishing astronomical tables at the age of ten, Caramuelis primus calamus (Madrid 1617). He studied Chinese. He was received into the Cistercian Order at the monastery of La Espina, in the diocese of Palencia in 1625, and after ordination entered upon a varied and brilliant career. He served in the monastery of Montederramo (diocese of Orense), then Santa María del Destierro (Salamanca), where he completed his studies. He probably attended the last classes of Agustín Antolínez (1554–1626), in that time the major theologian of the Augustinian Order in Salamanca. He then taught in houses in Alcalá, Palazuelos, and Salamanca. He then travelled to Portugal for the sake of studying oriental languages, and from there he moved to the Low Countries (the Spanish Netherlands), where he resided from 1635 to 1644.

=== In the Netherlands ===
Caramuel's sermons attracted the favorable attention of the Infante Ferdinand, Governor of the Low Countries, while he was attached to the monastery of Dunes in Flanders. He assisted Don Ferdinand in the defense of the city of Louvain from the attacks of the French and the Dutch, as engineer and chief of works, for which Don Ferdinand appointed him court preacher. Through Don Ferdinand, Caramuel became friends with Marie de' Medici, the exiled former queen-mother of France (1630–1642), who lived in Bruxelles, though she visited her daughter, the queen of England, for a period of three years. Through Marie's influence, Caramuel was appointed Vicar General of the Carthusians in England, Ireland, and Scotland; and named Abbot of Melrose.

In 1638 he defended his academic theses with great success, and was granted the degree of Doctor of Theology by the University of Leuven on 2 September 1638. Having learned more of the doctrines of Cornelius Jansen, who had died earlier in that year, Caramuel embarked on a preaching crusade through Belgium and Germany, especially Mainz. An inscription in the cathedral of Vigevano claims he brought some 30,000 persons back to practicing Roman Catholicism.

=== The Thirty Years' War ===
Caramuel's patron, the Cardinal Infante Ferdinand, died on 9 November 1641. When he was obliged to leave the Electorate of the Palatinate, Philip IV of Spain made him his envoy to the court of Emperor Ferdinand III whose court was residing in Prague at the time. He was in turn Abbot of Melrose (Scotland), Abbot-Superior of the Benedictines of Vienna, Abbot of the Benedictine Emmaus Monastery in Prague (1647), and Grand-Vicar to the Archbishop of Prague, Ernst Augustus z Harrach (1623–1667).

In 1648, when the Swedes attacked Prague, Caramuel armed and led a military division of ecclesiastics who helped defend the city. His bravery on this occasion merited for him a collar of gold from the emperor. "Being active in the political struggles of his time and carrying out the project of re-Catholicisation perhaps too vigorously," according to Petr Dvořák, "he made himself many enemies even within the Catholic camp." He soon left Central Europe for Italy.

=== Bishop Caramuel ===
In 1656 Caramuel visited Rome for the first time, where Pope Alexander VII named him Consultor of the Holy Office (Inquisition) and Consultor of the Sacred Congregation of Rites. Pope Alexander knew Caramuel well, since he had been papal legate in Cologne from 1639 to 1651. Soon after, on 9 July 1657, he was named Bishop of Campagna e Satrianum (1657–1673), a small and poor diocese in the Kingdom of Naples.

On 25 July 1673, Caramuel was appointed to the diocese of Vigevano near Milan (1673–1682), which he held until his death on 8 September 1682.

Caramuel was in active correspondence with famous scholars: the philosophers René Descartes and Pierre Gassendi; the Jesuit polymath Athanasius Kircher; the Czech Capuchin friar and astronomer Anton Maria Schyrleus of Rheita, the Bohemian doctor Jan Marek Marci, Pope Alexander VII (Fabio Chigi), who was a great admirer of his work; the Belgian astronomer Godefroy Wendelin, the theologians Franciscus Bonae Spei and Antonino Diana, Giovanni Battista Hodierna, Johannes Hevelius, Valerianus Magnus, Juan Eusebio Nieremberg, and many others.

He knew 24 languages.

== Works ==
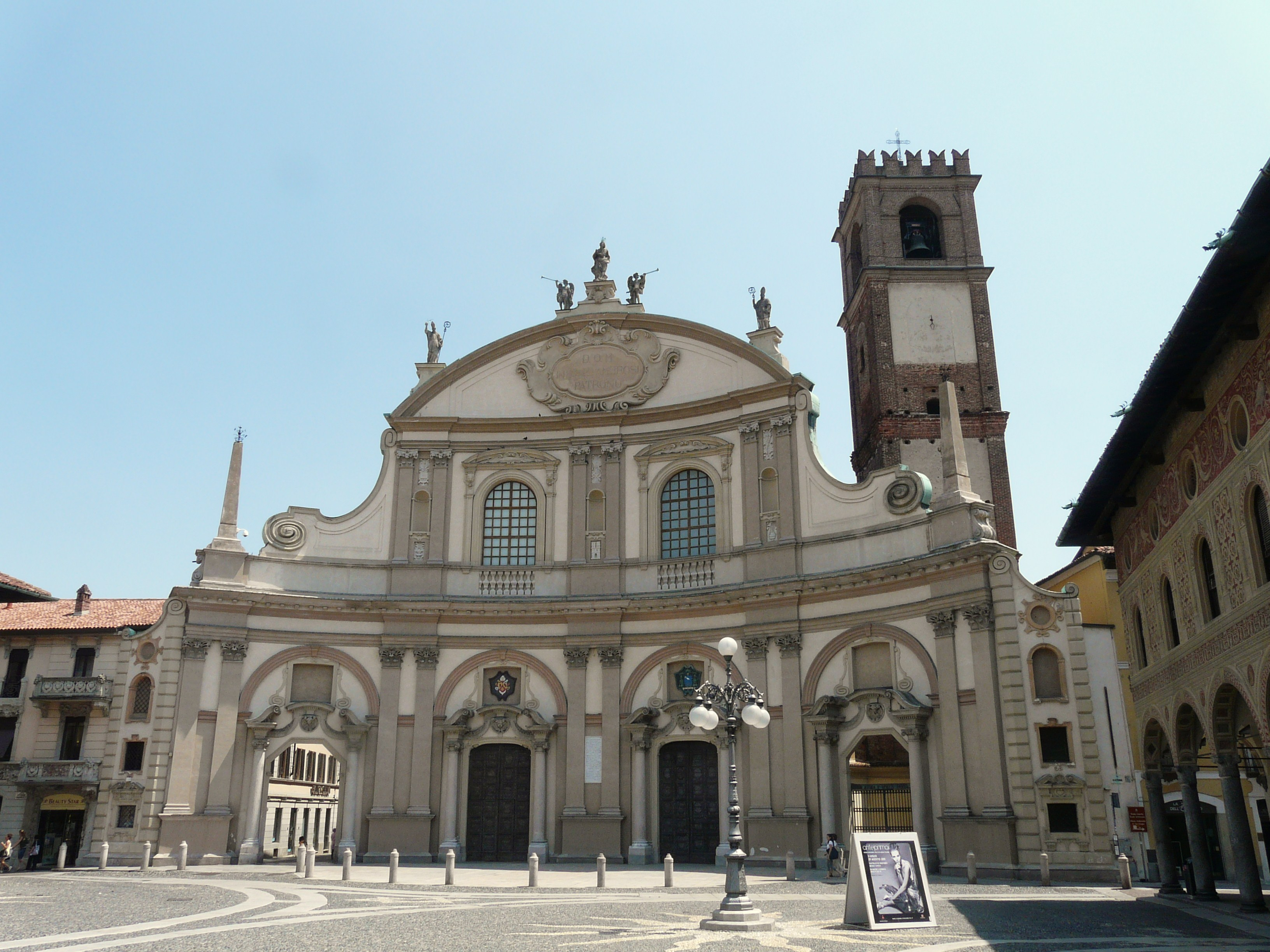
The façade of the Vigevano Cathedral (in Italy) was designed and built by Juan Caramuel y Lobkowitz.

His books are even more numerous than his awards and varied achievements. According to Jean-Noël Paquot, he published no fewer than 262 works on grammar, poetry, oratory, mathematics, astronomy, architecture, physics, politics, canon law, logic, metaphysics, theology, and asceticism.

Caramuel distanced himself from all established philosophical schools of the Baroque era (he often praised Thomas Aquinas but explicitly denied being a Thomist). Although educated in the Thomist tradition, he firmly believed in the humanist ideal of nullius addictus iurare in verba magistri (‘not to swear slavishly by the words of any master’). He refused to be enrolled in a specific school of thought and felt free to choose among all the authorities that would best suit his project of constructing a renovated Christian philosophy. He refers this attitude back to Augustine's teaching: ‘Augustine was no tyrant, since he was the Divine Master’, writes, and reminds that Augustine did not wish to be followed blindly. Augustine gave himself the example of a continuous change and progress of opinion in his numerous Retractationes (cf. Aug.'s reconsideration in persev. 21.55).

Caramuel loved to defend novel theories, and in Theologia moralis ad prima atque clarissima principia reducta (Leuven, 1643) tried to solve theological problems by mathematical rules. He was a leading exponent of probabilism and his permissive moral opinions were criticized in Pascal's Provincial Letters and gained for him from Alphonsus Liguori the title of "Prince of the Laxists". Contemporary theologian Julia A. Fleming argues with this assessment.

Mathesis nova, 1670

His mathematical work centred on combinatorics and he was one of the early writers on probability, republishing Huygens's work on dice with helpful explanations. Caramuel's Mathesis biceps presents some original contributions to the field of mathematics: he proposed a new method of approximation for trisecting an angle and proposed a form of logarithm that prefigure cologarithms, although he was not understood by his contemporaries. Caramuel was also the first mathematician who made a reasoned study on non-decimal counts, thus making a significant contribution to the development of the binary numeral system.

Caramuel’s Architectura civil, recta y obliqua, his most important writing on architecture, was published in Vigevano in 1678. The first volume provided a theological justification for the development of architecture from the Temple of Solomon, Jerusalem, to the Escorial (completed 1584), Madrid. Continuing a theme from Vitruvius (On Architecture I.i), he also expounded at length on the natural sciences that an architect should know: arithmetic, geometry, astronomy and music—the ars antiqua and ars nova. The principal innovation of the treatise was contained in the second volume in a discussion of architectura recta (‘orthogonal architecture’; Tratado V) and architectura obliqua (‘oblique architecture’; Tratado VI), which dealt respectively with the orders and the distortions (anamorphosis) that he believed were necessary to accommodate them to the more dynamic contemporary architecture. The third volume contained the illustrations, drawn by Caramuel himself; he described numerous variations on setting out the orders, including an Ionic order designed by Michelangelo for his buildings on the Capitoline Hill (begun 1560s), Rome; he also showed indigenous architecture from the New World, including a plan of the settlement of Hochelaga on the site of modern Montreal.

Caramuel claimed that his ideas on anamorphosis dated from 1624. Architects were already designing buildings with complex plan shapes, but Caramuel sought to extend the distortions from the wall surface to the orders themselves, so that all sloping elements in a building would involve the use of equivalent oblique members such as balusters, column capitals and architraves. This theory met with little application among practising architects because it necessitated the abandonment of the modular basis of Classical architecture in favour of a geometrical basis.

Caramuel was responsible for the design of the façade of the Vigevano Cathedral, an eclectic design showing some virtuosity in its geometrical relationship to the square. It corrects the irregular relationship of the cathedral to the square in the Renaissance layout and makes it symmetrical by means of a skillful illusion created by the addition of an axis to the façade where a side-strect flanks the cathedral. The eclecticism of the form recalls related configurations of Nicolaus Goldmann ("second example of a church") and Christopher Wren (Saint Peter Cornhill).

== Printed works ==
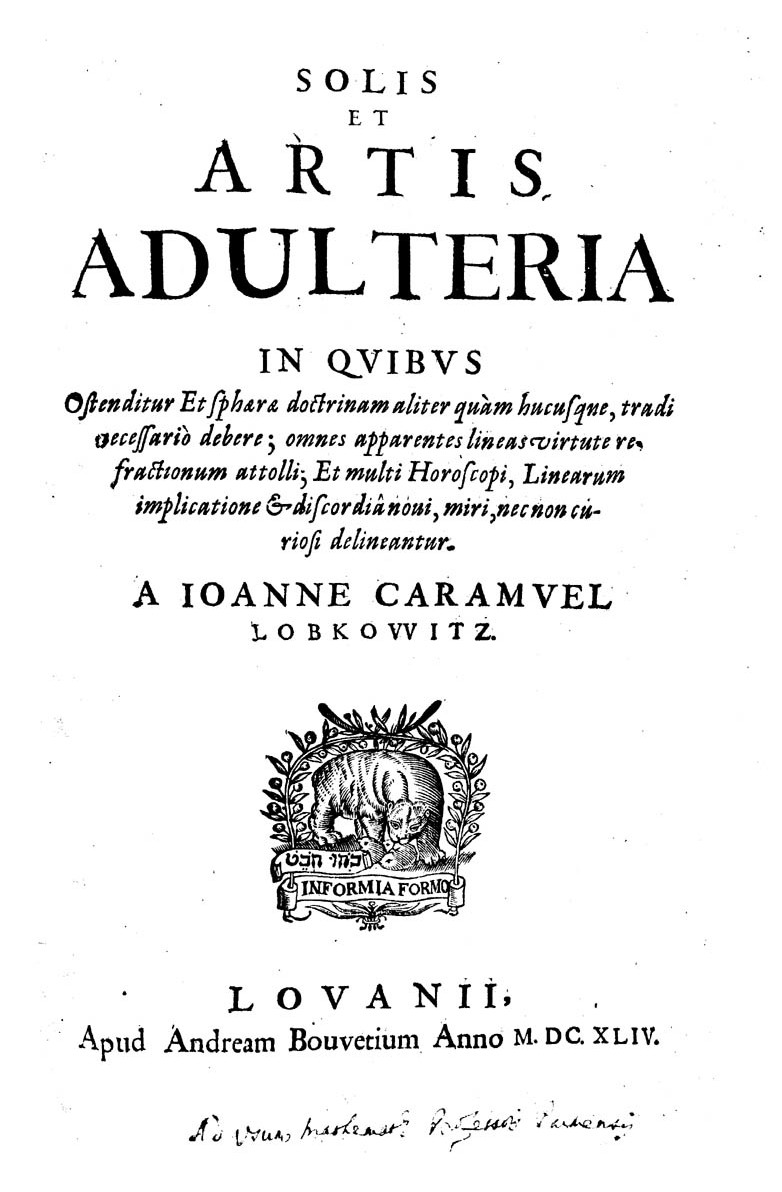
Solis et artis adulteria, 1644

- Philippus Prudens. Antwerp: Plantin Press. 1639.
- Respuesta al Manifiesto del Reyno de Portugal, Antwerp, 1641.
- Rationalis et realis philosophia, Leuven, 1642.
- Solis et artis adulteria (in Latin). Leuven: André Bouvet. 1644.
- Theologia moralis fundamentalis, praeterintentionalis, decalogica, sacramentalis, canonica, regularis, civilis, militaris, Frankfurt, 1652–1653.
- Theologia rationalis, Frankfurt, 1654–1655.
- Theologia moralis fundamentalis, editio secunda, Rome, 1656.
- Primus calamus ob oculos ponens metametricam, quae variis currentium, recurrentium, adscendentium, descendentium, nec-non circumvolantium versuum ductibus, aut aeri incisos, aut buxo insculptos, aut plumbo infusos, multiformes labyrinthos exponat. Rome: Fabius Falconius. 1663.
- Mathesis biceps. 1 (in Latin). Lyon: Laurent Anisson. 1667.
- Mathesis nova (in Latin). Campagna: Sebastiano Alecci. 1670.
- Arquitectura civil recta y oblicua..., Vigevano, C. Corrado, 1678[-1679].
- Leptotatos, latine subtilissimus, Vigevano 1681 (in Latin). (Spanish translation: Leptotatos [Neuva lengua sutilisima] Metalogica, Pamplona: Eunsa, 2008

== See also ==
- List of Roman Catholic scientist-clerics
- Lobkowicz

== Sources ==
- Mazzini, Lorenzo (1893). Vigevano ed i suoi vescovi (in Italian). Mortara: A. Cortellezzi.
- Curl, J.; Wilson, S. (2015). "Caramuel de Lobkowitz, Juan". A Dictionary of Architecture and Landscape Architecture. Oxford University Press.
- Ceñal, Ramón (1953). "Juan Caramuel. Su epistolario con Atanasio Kircher, S.J.". Revista de Filosofía. 12 (44): 101–47.
- De Ferrari, Augusto (1976). "CARAMUEL LOBKOWICZ, Juan". Dizionario Biografico degli Italiani (in Italian). Vol. 19: Cappi–Cardona. Rome: Institute of the Italian Encyclopaedia. ISBN 978-88-12-00032-6.
- J. Franklin, The Science of Conjecture: Evidence and Probability Before Pascal, Baltimore, Johns Hopkins University Press, 2001, 88-94.
- Fleming, Julia (2006). Defending Probabilism: The Moral Theology of Juan Caramuel. Washington, D.C.: Georgetown University Press. ISBN 978-1589011137.
- O'Neil, Leo (1908). "Juan Caramuel y Lobkowitz". In Charles Coulston Gillispie (ed.). The Catholic Encyclopedia. Vol. 3. New York: Robert Appleton Company.
- Vernet, Juan (1971). "Caramuel y Lobkowitz, Juan". In Charles Coulston Gillispie (ed.). Dictionary of Scientific Biography. Vol. III. New York: Charles Scribner's Sons. p. 61.
- Yánez Neira, D.; Masolivier, A.; Romero, A.; Rafael de Pascual, F. (2014). "Juan Caramuel y Lobkowitz". Cistercium: Revista cisterciense. 262: 248–266.
- Pérez Martínez, Ricardo (2016). "The Poetic Machines of Monsignor Juan Caramuel y Lobkowitz". International Journal of Transmedia Literacy. 2: 11–24. doi:10.7358/ijtl-2016-001-pere. ISSN 2465-227X.
