= Francesco Pianzola =

Italian Roman Catholic priest

Blessed Francesco Pianzola
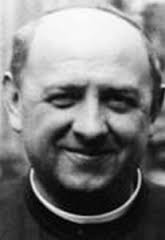
- Born: 5 October 1881; Sartirana Lomellina, Pavia, Kingdom of Italy
- Died: 4 June 1943 (aged 61); Mortara, Pavia, Kingdom of Italy
- Venerated in: Roman Catholic Church
- Beatified: 4 October 2008, Cathedral of Saint Ambrose, Vigevano, Pavia, Italy by Cardinal José Saraiva Martins
- Feast: 4 June

Francesco Pianzola (5 October 1881 – 4 June 1943) was an Italian Roman Catholic priest who established the Missionary Sisters of the Immaculata, Queen of Peace. Pianzola was a preacher who administered to the poor and to children in their own homes; his order dealt with bringing the message of Jesus Christ to the workers and to the poor.

He was beatified in 2008; Cardinal José Saraiva Martins presided over the mass on behalf of Pope Benedict XVI.

== Life ==
Francesco Pianzola was born on 5 October 1881 in Pavia as the son of farmers. He was a pious child who felt drawn to the concept of religious life; he commenced his studies for the priesthood in Vigevano where he completed his theological studies which would enable him to become a priest.

Pianzola was ordained to the priesthood on 16 March 1907 in Pavia under the bishop Pietro Berruti. He administered to the workers as well as those who were poor and he had a strong desire to preach the message of the Gospel to all people. With a humble spirit he embarked on a quest to evangelize to the workers – he remembered his farmer roots and made an effort to preach to farmers that toiled in the fields.

For the purpose of a passion of preaching he established a religious congregation in Mortara on 8 May 1919 to go to the poor and to the workers for evangelization as well as to bring them the love of Jesus Christ and His message. He became renowned for this earning him the affection of hundreds; he was known for his holiness and his death on 4 June 1943 saw him mourned across Pavia. He was hailed after his death as the "Apostle of Lomellina" and a protector of the farmers and workers.

== Beatification ==
The beatification process commenced in Vigevano on 22 March 1983 in a local process that spanned from 4 June 1983 until 25 March 1990 – the process granted him the honorific title Servant of God (the first stage in the process). The process saw the gathering of documents that would be used to support the cause. The validation of the process was given in Rome in 1992 and allowed for the Positio to be drawn up and sent to the Congregation for the Causes of Saints in 1999.

On 26 June 2006 he was proclaimed to be Venerable after Pope Benedict XVI recognized that Pianzola had lived a model Christian life of heroic virtue.

The diocesan process for the miracle attributed to his intercession opened in Vercelli on 3 December 2001 and concluded on 20 September 2002; the process was validated in 2003 which would enable for the medical documentation to be evaluated in the next stage. Benedict XVI recognized the healing as being a miracle and delegated Cardinal José Saraiva Martins to preside over the beatification on 4 October 2008 in Pavia. The Mass was celebrated before a crowd of 6000 people.

The assigned postulator of the cause is Tiziana Adriana Conterbia.
