= Vincenzo Di Mauro =

Styles of Vincenzo Di Mauro
- Reference style: The Most Reverend
- Spoken style: Your Excellency
- Religious style: Monsignor

Vincenzo Di Mauro (born 1 December 1951) is an Italian Catholic bishop, archbishop-bishop emeritus of the Roman Catholic Diocese of Vigevano, and prior to that was an official of the Roman Curia. He was appointed coadjutor-bishop of Vigevano, which is part of the Province of Milan, by Pope Benedict XVI on Monday, 22 November 2010, and given the "ad personam" (personal) title of archbishop. He succeeded Bishop Claudio Baggini as Bishop of Vegevano on March 12, 2011. He was appointed as secretary of the Prefecture for the Economic Affairs of the Holy See and as the titular bishop of Arpi in 2007. He was ordained a bishop by Pope Benedict XVI (principal consecrator) and Cardinals Tarcisio Bertone and Marian Jaworski on 29 September 2007. He was born in Monza and was ordained a priest in Milan on 12 June 1976.

He graduated in modern literature and journalism at the Catholic University of the Sacred Heart. He served as vicar of the parish of Santa Maria Regina Pacis a Milano, from 1976 to 1981. He served as vicar of the parish of Sant’Ambrogio from 1981 to 1983. He was Assistant Diocesan Catholic Action for children and Assistant Masters Catholics (AIMC) from 1984 to 1987.

He served as rector of the Shrine of St. Anthony in Milan and assistant to the archbishop of Milan in 1991. He went to Rome on 1 November 1994 to work with the Pontifical Council for the Laity, which oversees movements and associations, and where he was appointed head of office (capo d'ufficio) on 29 April 1995. He left the service in the Curia and returned to Milan in June 1998.

After parish work in Milan, he was appointed as delegate to the Ordinary Section to the Administration of the Patrimony of the Apostolic See on 2 January 2004. He speaks English and French. He was appointed as secretary of the Prefecture for the Economic Affairs of the Holy See in 2007.

On July 21, 2012 he resigned as Bishop of Vigevano. He resigned after just 16 months, stating health concerns. His resignation was accepted under Canon 401 § 2 of the 1983 Code of Canon Law.
