= Diocese of Vigevano =

Roman Catholic diocese in Italy

Coordinates: 45.3167°N 8.8667°E

Diocese of Vigevano Dioecesis Viglevanensis

Catholic
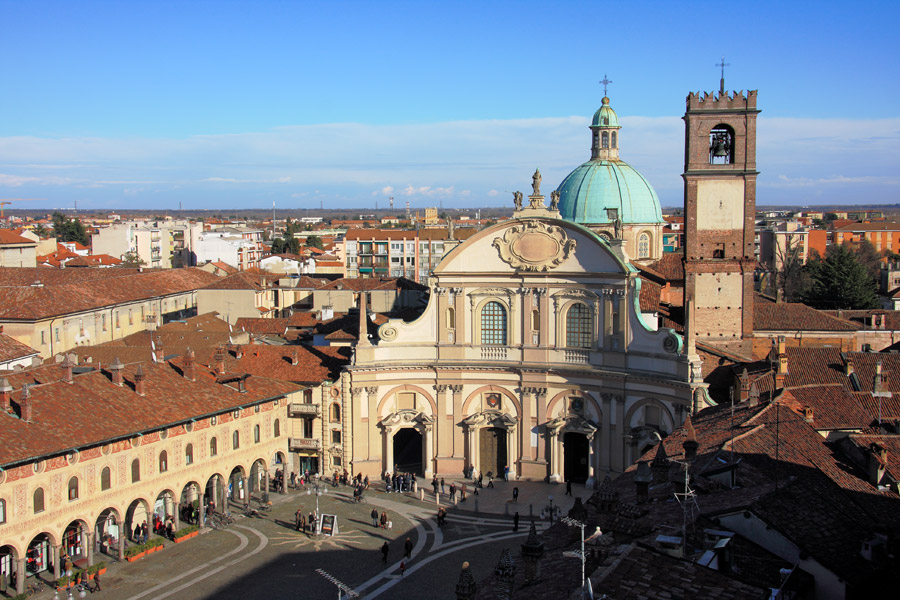
- Vigevano Cathedral

Location
- Country: Italy
- Ecclesiastical province: Milan

Statistics
- Area: 1,509 km^{2} (583 sq mi)
- Population: Total; Catholics: (as of 2022); 187,330 (est.) ▼; 178,650 (est.) ▼
- Parishes: 87

Information
- Denomination: Catholic Church
- Rite: Roman Rite
- Established: 14 March 1530 (496 years ago)
- Cathedral: Cattedrale di S. Ambrogio
- Secular priests: 88 (diocesan) ▼8 (Religious Orders) ▼11 Permanent Deacons

Current leadership
- Pope: Leo XIV
- Bishop: Maurizio Gervasoni
- Bishops emeritus: Vincenzo Di Mauro

Map

Website
- www.diocesivigevano.it

The Diocese of Vigevano (Latin: Dioecesis Viglevanensis) is a Latin diocese of the Catholic Church which lies almost entirely in the Province of Pavia, Lombardy. It has existed since 1530. The diocese is suffragan of the Archdiocese of Milan, having been suffragan of the Archdiocese of Vercelli until 9 April 1578.

== History ==
The earliest notices of Vigevano date from the tenth century, when it was favoured as a residence by King Arduin of Ivrea (1002–1014) for hunting. In the next period it was a Ghibelline commune, and was accordingly besieged and taken by the Milanese in 1201 and again in 1275. In 1328 it surrendered to Azzone Visconti, and thereafter shared the political fortunes of Milan. In the last years of the Visconti domination it sustained a siege by Francesco Sforza.

At the end of September 1418, Pope Martin V visited Vigevano and a number of other cities of Lombardy during his trip from Konstanz to Rome.

Until 1530 the town belonged to the Diocese of Novara, and its principal church, San Ambrogio, was staffed by a Chapter composed of a Provost and seven Canons. Duke Francesco II Sforza of Milan procured the erection of the see and provided its revenues. The diocese was created by Pope Clement VII in the bull "Ex eminenti" of 17 March 1529.

The first bishop was Galeazzo Pietra, succeeded by his nephew Maurizio Pietra (1552); both of these promoted the Tridentine reforms, and the work was continued by their successors. Marsilio Landriani (1594) distinguished himself in various nunciatures and founded a Barnabite college for the education of young men. Giorgio Odescalchi (1610) was a very zealous pastor; the process of his beatification has been commenced. Giovanni Caramuel Lobkowitz (1675) was an example of pastoral activity and the author of many works, philosophical, theological, ascetical etc., though his Theologia fundamentalis was censured. Pier Marino Sonnani (1688), a Franciscan, who enlarged the seminary and maintained a struggle against the spread of the doctrines of Miguel Molinos.

With the Treaty of Worms (1743) the diocese became part of the Kingdom of Sardinia.

All cathedral chapters and collegiate church chapters were abolished by the French Occupation government on 28 March 1801. It was restored by N. Bonaparte, Emperor of the French and King of Italy (1805–1814) in 1805.

From 1802 until May 1805, Vigevano was a constituent element of the Italian Republic, of which Napoleon was the president. It was a District in the Department of Agogna, with its capital at Novara. A concordat with the papacy was signed on 16 September 1803. In Article II, §4 of the Concordat, Vigevano was assigned to the metropolitanate of Milan. In Article XV, §17, the suppression of ecclesiastical foundations without the consent of the Holy See was forbidden.

Bishop Nicola Saverio Gamboni of the diocese of Capri was appointed to the see by Napoleon in 1805, but he was refused his bulls of transfer and institution by Pope Pius VII. He was therefore only the Administrator of the temporalities of the diocese.

In 1817, after the agreements at the Congress of Vienna, which returned the Kingdom of Sardinia to the House of Savoy after French occupation, the diocese of Vigevano received an addition to its territory.

=== Diocesan synods ===
A diocesan synod was an irregularly held, but important, meeting of the bishop of a diocese and his clergy. Its purpose was (1) to proclaim generally the various decrees already issued by the bishop; (2) to discuss and ratify measures on which the bishop chose to consult with his clergy; (3) to publish statutes and decrees of the diocesan synod, of the provincial synod, and of the Holy See.

Bishop Maurizio Pietra (1552–1576) presided over a diocesan synod in 1572. A diocesan synod was held by Bishop Alessandro Casale (1577–1582) in 1578. In 1587, Bishop Bernardino Bricennio (1582–1588) held a diocesan synod. Bishop Marsilio Landriani (1593–1609) held a diocesan synod in 1608.

A diocesan synod was held by Bishop Giuseppe Maria Scarampi (1757–1801) on 13–15 June 1768, noting in his letter of summons that it had been a century since the last synod. Bishop Giovanni Francesco Toppia (1818–1828) held a diocesan synod on 14–16 September 1823, to repair the damage done during the French occupation. Bishop Pietro Giuseppe de Gaudenzi (1871–1891) presided over a diocesan synod on 23–25 August 1876. De Gaudenzi held his third diocesan synod on 16–17 September 1886.

=== Chapter and cathedral ===
The church which became the Cathedral of Vigevano was initially built in 1100, and then rebuilt in the sixteenth century through a commission by Duke Francesco II Sforza. It was dedicated to S. Ambrose, the bishop of Milan in the 4th century. The facade of the second and current structure was re-designed by Bishop Juan Caramuel y Lobkowitz in 1673 (completed c. 1680).

The original bull of erection of the diocese instituted a cathedral Chapter with four dignities, the Provost, the Archdeacon, the Archpriest, and the Dean. The number of Canons was fixed at twelve. The cathedral continued to function as a parish church. Shortly thereafter, two more dignities were added: the Cantor and the Primicerius. In 1671, the cathedral Chapter, the corporation responsible for the operation and administration of the cathedral, its liturgical life, and its property, was composed of six dignities and twelve Canons.

The Chapter was abolished by the French Occupation government on 28 March 1801. It was restored by First Consul N. Bonaparte in 1805. Following the restoration, it had three dignities (Provost, Archdeacon, and Archpriest) and eleven Canons. In addition there were four chaplains appointed by the King of Sardinia, five chaplains called Marini after Bishop Pier Marino Sormani, and seven chaplains with various other patrons.

The Church of S. Pietro Martiere was built, with the adjacent Dominican convent, by Filippo Maria Visconti in 1445; the convent is now used for government offices and courts. Among the civil edifices is the castle, once a fortress, built by Bramante in 1492, by order of Ludovico il Moro, which became a royal palace.

== Bishops ==
=== 1530 to 1700 ===
- Galeazzo Pietra (14 Mar 1530 – 27 Oct 1552)
- Maurizio Pietra (27 Oct 1552 – 20 May 1576)
- Alessandro Casale (1 Jul 1577 – 16 Feb 1582)
- Bernardino Bricennio (Brisseno) (5 Nov 1582 – 11 Aug 1588)
- Pietro Fauno Costacciaro (12 Jun 1589 – 9 Sep 1592)
- Marsilio Landriani (10 Nov 1593 – 27 Aug 1609)
- Pietro Giorgio Odescalchi (26 May 1610 – 7 May 1620)
- Francisco Romero, O. Carm. (11 Jan 1621 – 16 Jul 1635)

Sede vacante (1635–1648)

- Juan Gutiérrez (18 May 1648 – 20 Mar 1649)

Sede vacante (1649–1654)

- Gabriel Adarzo de Santander y Martínez de Viaín, O. de M. (9 Mar 1654 –1657)
- Attilio Pietrasanta, O. Cist. (1659–1666)
- Gerolamo Visconti (3 Oct 1667 – 26 Oct 1670)
- Giovanni Rasino (1 Jul 1671 – 18 Nov 1672)
- Juan Caramuel y Lobkowitz, O.S.B. (25 Sep 1673 – 7 Sep 1682)
- Ferdinando de Rojas (1683–1685)
- Pier Marino Sormani, O.F.M. (1688–1702)

=== since 1700 ===
- Gerolamo Archinto (1703–1710)
- Giorgio Cattaneo (2 Mar 1712 – 7 Nov 1730)
- Carlo Bossi (1731–1753)
- Francesco Agostino della Chiesa (17 Feb 1755 – 11 Aug 1755)
- Giuseppe Maria Scarampi (18 Jul 1757 – 18 Feb 1801)

Sede vacante (1801–1805)

Nicola Zaverio Gambone (1805–1807)

- Francesco Milesi (18 Sep 1807 – 23 Sep 1816)
- Giovanni Francesco Toppia (25 May 1818 – 20 Jul 1828)
- Giovanni Battista Accusani (1830–1843)
- Pio Vincenzo Forzani (25 Jan 1844 – 15 Dec 1859)

Sede vacante (1859–1871)

- Pietro Giuseppe de Gaudenzi (27 Oct 1871 – 15 Oct 1891)
- Giacomo Merizzi (14 Dec 1891 – 28 Nov 1898 Resigned)
- Pietro Berruti (28 Nov 1898 – 8 Apr 1921)
- Angelo Giacinto Scapardini, O.P. (27 Aug 1921 – 18 May 1937)
- Giovanni Bargiggia (6 Jul 1937 – 11 Apr 1946)
- Antonio Picconi (13 Jun 1946 – 21 Apr 1952)
- Luigi Barbero (26 Jul 1952 – 1 Apr 1971)
- Mario Rossi (4 Aug 1971 – 19 Aug 1988)
- Giovanni Locatelli (12 Nov 1988 – 18 Mar 2000 Retired)
- Claudio Baggini (18 Mar 2000 – 12 Mar 2011 Resigned)
- Vincenzo Di Mauro (12 Mar 2011 – 21 Jul 2012 Resigned)
- Maurizio Gervasoni (20 Jul 2013 – )

== Parishes ==
Of the 87 parishes 86 are located, like Vigevano, within the Province of Pavia in Lombardy. The exception is S. Silvano Martire which is within the commune of Sozzago in the Piedmontese province of Novara. In 2014 there was one priest for every 1,682 Catholics.

== Books ==
=== Reference works ===
- Gams, Pius Bonifatius (1873). Series episcoporum Ecclesiae catholicae: quotquot innotuerunt a beato Petro apostolo. Ratisbon: Typis et Sumptibus Georgii Josephi Manz. p. 827.
- Eubel, Conradus; Gulik, Guilelmus (1923). Hierarchia catholica, Tomus 3 (second ed.). Münster: Libreria Regensbergiana. p. 334.
- Gauchat, Patritius (Patrice) (1935). Hierarchia catholica IV (1592-1667). Münster: Libraria Regensbergiana. p. 369.
- Ritzler, Remigius; Sefrin, Pirminus (1952). Hierarchia catholica medii et recentis aevi V (1667-1730). Patavii: Messagero di S. Antonio. p. 415.
- Ritzler, Remigius; Sefrin, Pirminus (1958). Hierarchia catholica medii et recentis aevi VI (1730-1799). Patavii: Messagero di S. Antonio. p. 442.
- Ritzler, Remigius; Sefrin, Pirminus (1968). Hierarchia Catholica medii et recentioris aevi sive summorum pontificum, S. R. E. cardinalium, ecclesiarum antistitum series... A pontificatu Pii PP. VII (1800) usque ad pontificatum Gregorii PP. XVI (1846) (in Latin). Vol. VII. Monasterii: Libr. Regensburgiana.
- Remigius Ritzler; Pirminus Sefrin (1978). Hierarchia catholica Medii et recentioris aevi... A Pontificatu PII PP. IX (1846) usque ad Pontificatum Leonis PP. XIII (1903) (in Latin). Vol. VIII. Il Messaggero di S. Antonio.
- Pięta, Zenon (2002). Hierarchia catholica medii et recentioris aevi... A pontificatu Pii PP. X (1903) usque ad pontificatum Benedictii PP. XV (1922) (in Latin). Vol. IX. Padua: Messagero di San Antonio. ISBN 978-88-250-1000-8.

=== Studies ===
- Biffignandi Buccella, Pietro Giorgio (1810). Memorie Istoriche della Città e Contado di Vigevano (in Italian). Vigevano.
- Cappelletti, Giuseppe (1858). Le chiese d'Italia: dalla loro origine sino ai nostri giorni (in Italian). Vol. decimoquarto (XIV). Venice: G. Antonelli. pp. 595–648.
- Gianolio, Matteo (1844). De Viglevano et omnibus episcopis qui usque ad MDCCCI sanctam et regiam viglevanensem ecclesiam rexere commentaria historica ex variis monumentis excerpta (in Latin). Novara: F. Artaria.
- Lorenzo, Mazzini D. (1893). Vigevano ed i suoi vescovi (in Italian). Mortara: A. Cortellezzi.
- Ughelli, Ferdinando; Niccolò Coleti (1719). Italia sacra, sive De episcopis Italiæ (in Latin). Vol. 4 (Tomus quartus). Venice: apud Sebastianum Coleti. pp. 816–826.
