= Monumental Cemetery of Mortara =

Cemetery in Mortara, Italy

Cimitero Monumentale di Mortara Monumental Cemetery of Mortara
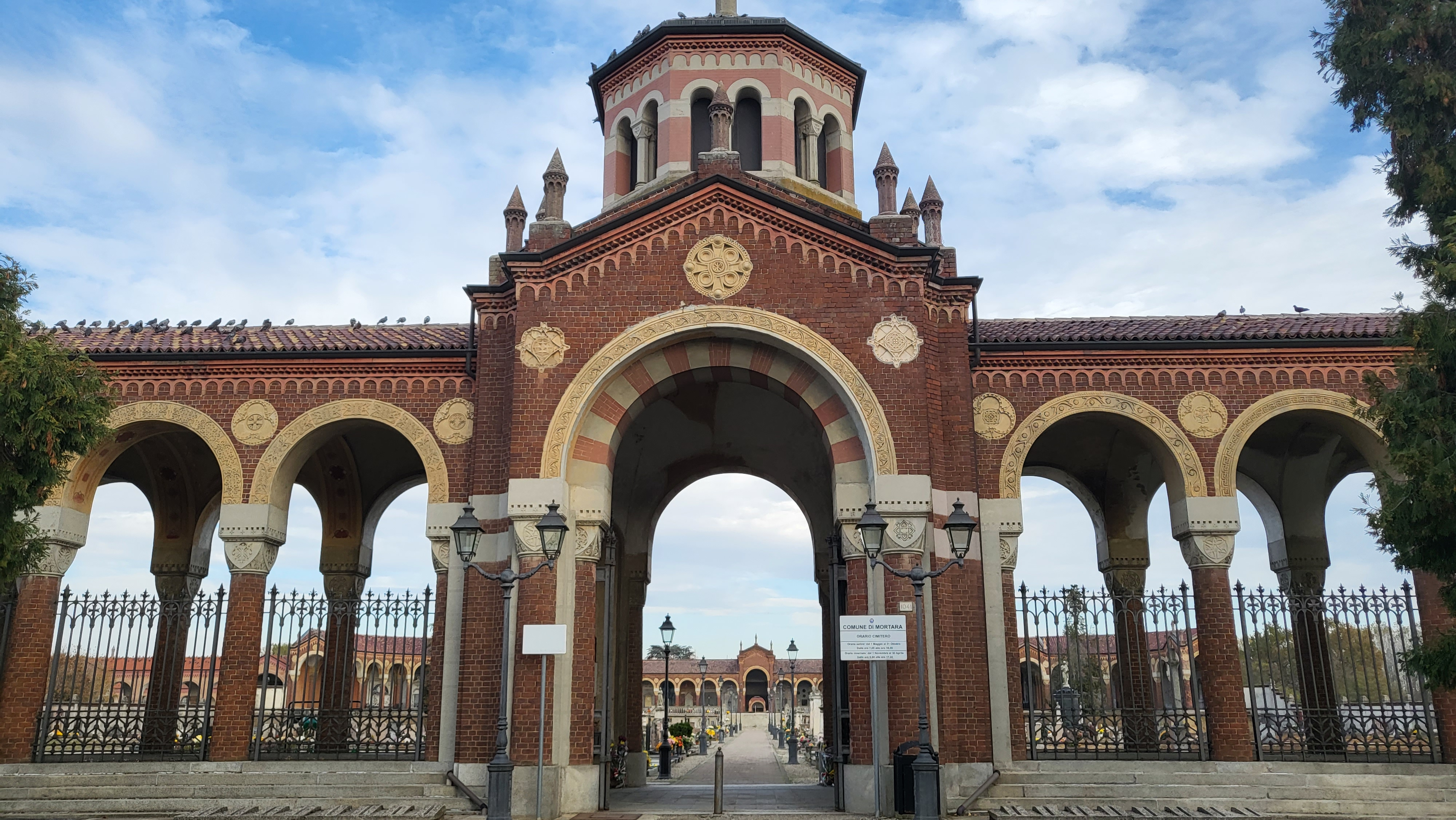
- The main entrance of the Monumental Cemetery of Mortara, Italy
- Interactive map of Cimitero Monumentale di Mortara; Monumental Cemetery of Mortara

Details
- Established: 1802
- Location: Mortara, Lombardy
- Country: Italy
- Coordinates: 45°15′36″N 8°45′18″E
- Type: Historic Roman Catholic
- Style: Monumental Baroque
- Owned by: City of Mortara
- Size: 38,636 m^{2} (415,870 sq ft)

The Monumental Cemetery of Mortara (Italian: Cimitero Monumentale di Mortara) is located in the north-eastern outskirts of the city of Mortara, an Italian comune in the province of Pavia, in the region of Lombardy in northern Italy. The Monumental Cemetery of Mortara is one of the biggest and most important cemeteries in the Lomellina area.

It is constructed in the traditional style of monumental cemeteries, with headstones and other monuments made of marble, granite and similar materials, and which rise vertically above the ground (typically around 50 cm (20 in) but some can be over 2 metres (6 ft 7 in) tall). Like most monumental cemeteries, the Monumental Cemetery of Mortara was outside the city because of health considerations, and a 19th-century belief that "death must be removed from the gaze of the living".

== History ==
=== Origins ===
The original city Cemetery was located within the city next to the church of San Lorenzo. In 1802, in response to health and olfactory factors related to the existing Cemetery, a new Cemetery was constructed outside the city by the Municipality of Mortara, at that time belonging to the Cisalpine Republic. The new location was adjacent to the road to Vigevano, in the locality of San Rocco. Due to the Cemetery's new location, the name was changed to the Cemetery of San Rocco al Porto. Despite the relocation, the new Cemetery soon became insufficient due to the growth of the local population. By 1846 both the Bishop of Vigevano and the Canon Reverend Calvi were requesting an expansion because the space was not sufficient and they were having to bury the deceased outside of the Cemetery.

=== Morosetti's project ===
The City Council discussed the expansion of the Cemetery in the Assembly of 26 May 1883, in the presence of the mayor Cotta Ramusino. The requests were: physical expansion, aesthetic improvement of the existing structure, and the creation of family graves. The project appraisal was initially assigned to the architect Carlo Morosetti. His proposed project was unsuccessful and the Council decided to entrust it to someone else.

=== Colla's project ===
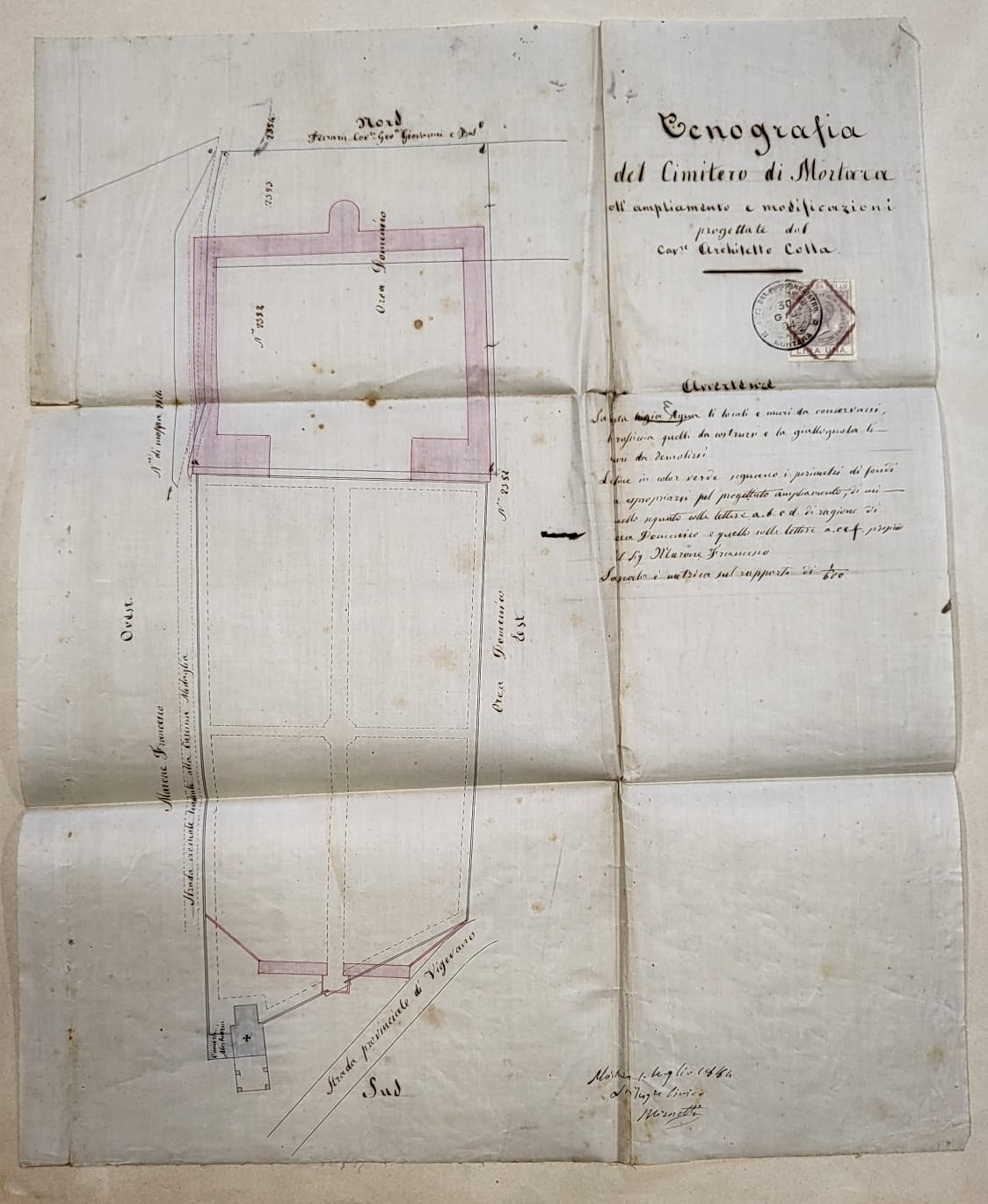
Angelo Colla's original drawing for the expansion project of the Monumental Cemetery of Mortara

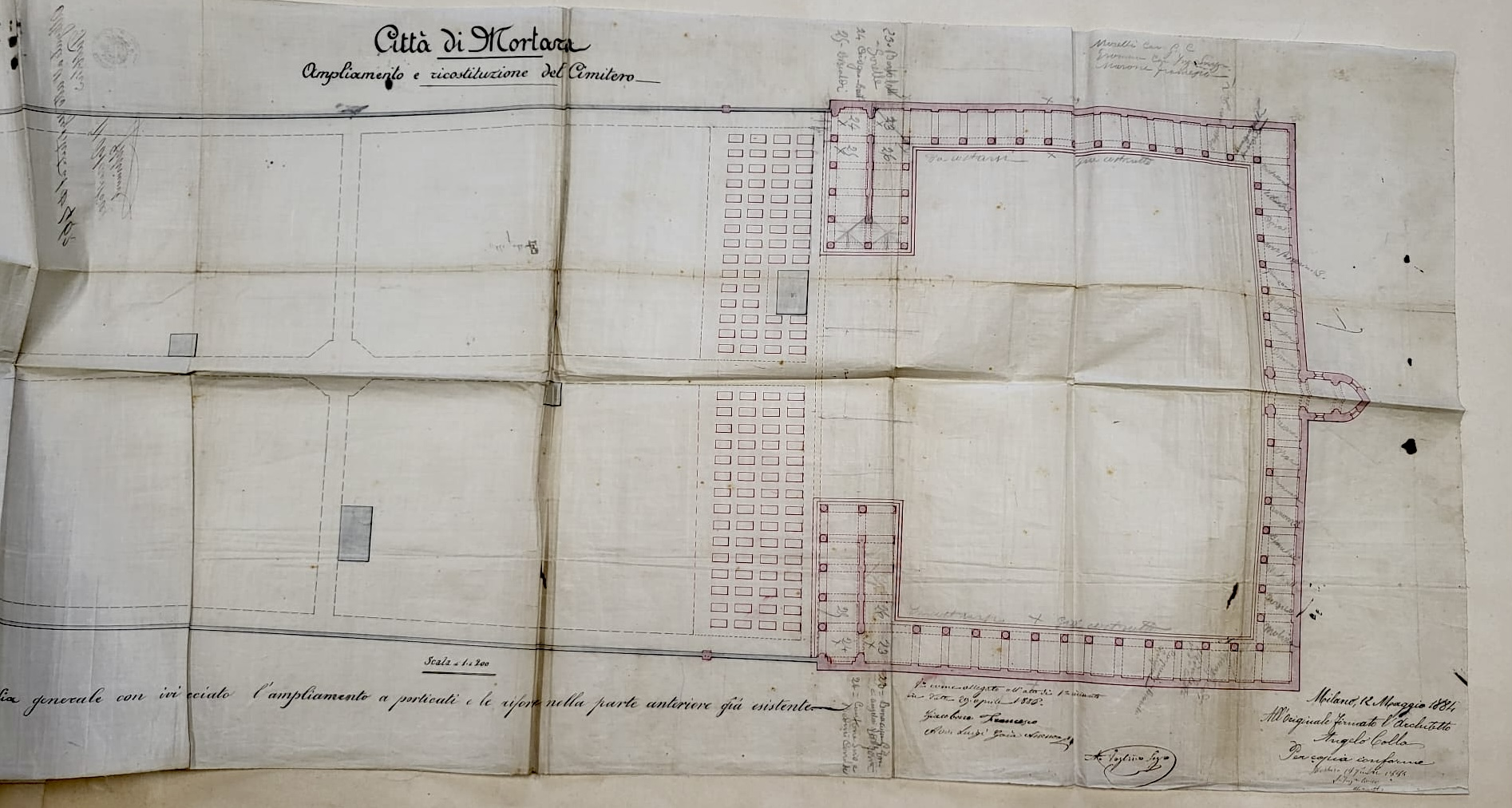
Angelo Colla's original more detailed expansion drawing of the Monumental Cemetery of Mortara

On 23 May 1884, the architect Angelo Colla was entrusted to pursue the project and it was approved by the Prefect of the province. Colla planned:

- The expansion of the existing Cemetery;
- The construction of porches on the outskirts of the area to be extended with their respective crypts;
- The construction of a chapel in the centre of the new porch;
- The arrangement of the perimeter construction, including a new building constructed sideways to the entrance door, and arches to locate mausoleums;
- The construction of the front entrance with two structures to be assigned to the accommodation of the caretaker, and a mortuary.

The City Council unanimously approved Colla's project, as it was considered to be a work that would honour the city and that would address the concerns with the existing site. Colla's expansion project was paid for by the Municipality but the arches and the crypts were at the expense of the concessionary families. The Construction ended in 1894 and the total amount spent was 101.667 lire, of which 25.000 came from the Municipality.

=== Pirovano's project ===
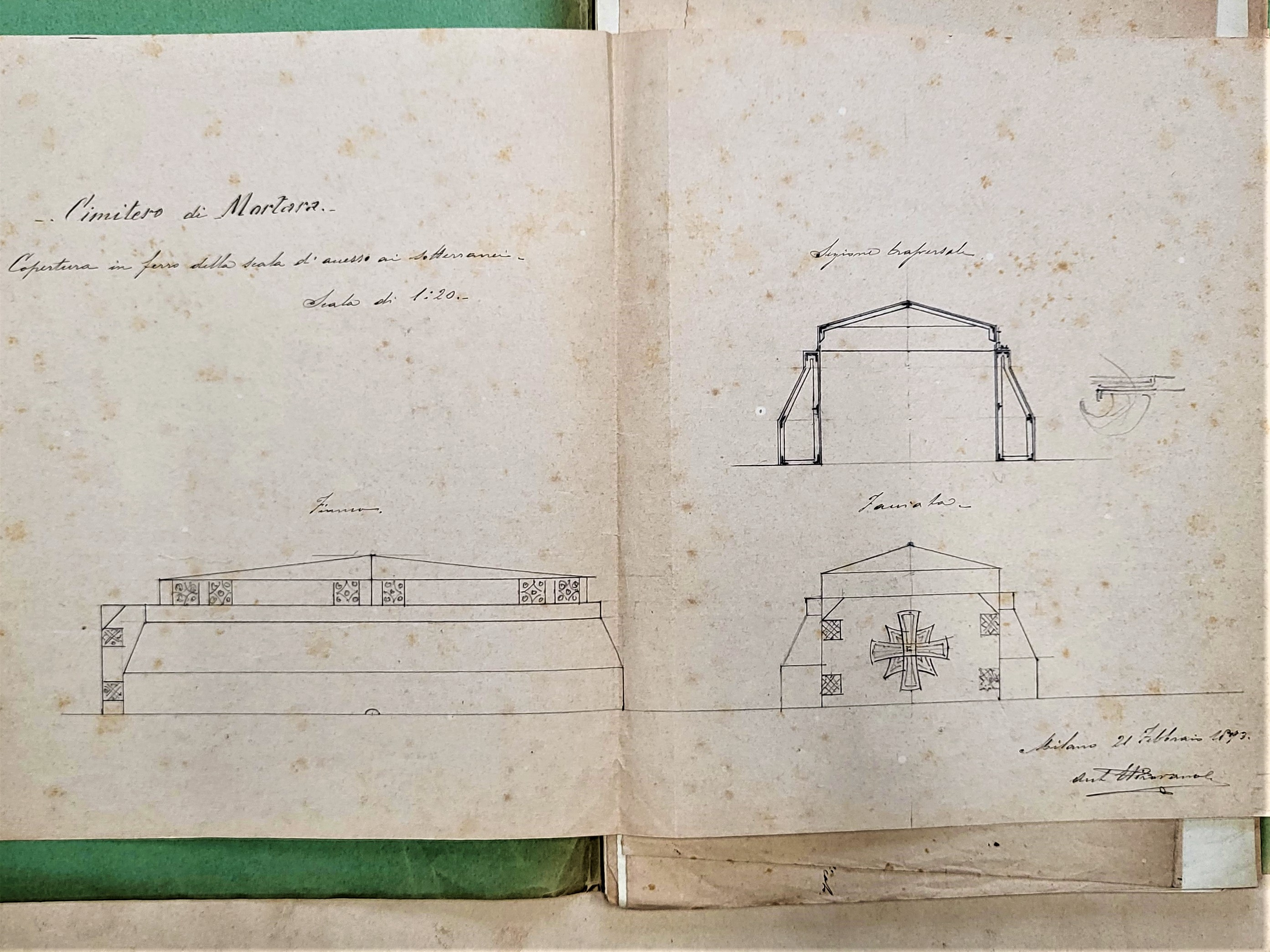
Architect Ernesto Pirovano's original drawing of the iron cover of the stairway leading to the underground areas of the Monumental Cemetery of Mortara

In 1902, the lack of space made it necessary to further expand the Cemetery, with the construction of further chapels. On 29 November 1902, the Municipal Council discussed the measures regarding the building of new arches, in accord with those previously constructed by the architect Angelo Colla. On 26 September 1904, the Council decided to entrust the expansion project to the architect Ernesto Pirovano, who had previously collaborated with Colla. In June 1907 the project was presented and approved by the council.

The works carried out as the basis of the new project were:

- The main entrance building
- Two sidearms, one located to the east and the other to the west
- Two arms perpendicular to the facade
- New aches connected to those already built on the north side
- The demolition and replacement of old walls
- The demolition of the old oratory with a porch in front of it

Pirovano's project was completed in 1911. The total amount spent was 72.150 lire, 19.700 of which came from private contributions. After the second expansion, for many years the Monumental Cemetery of Mortara was not modified, except for periodic maintenance work.

=== Modern expansion ===
In 2016, in response to the constant requests for more niches and tombs, the Comune of Mortara decided to invest 800,000 euros in the Cemetery's extension. This intervention was considered necessary due to the limited number of existing tombs available. The renovation took place in two different areas: the main Cemetery in Milanese Street where 200 new tombs and 6 chapels would be constructed and the Casoni di Sant'Albino's Cemetery with the addition of 20 niches. The project for the Casoni di Sant'Albino cemetery was carried out accordingly to the planned schedule. The reconstruction of the main Cemetery in Milanese Street was repeatedly postponed by the junta of Mortara beyond the planned start date of early 2017. In 2020 the project plan was accepted by the City Council. The maintenance and expansion of the Cemetery included the construction of the Garden of Remembrance, the common cinerary and the new common ossuary.

== Architects ==
=== Carlo Morosetti ===
Carlo Morosetti was an Italian engineer and civic expert of the city of Mortara in the years of the construction of the Cemetery. He was responsible for the evaluation and the purchase of the land for the expansion.

=== Angelo Colla ===
Angelo Colla (1827–1892) was an Italian decorator and a restorer. He was known as an architect that took inspiration from and was influenced by the artistic movement called eclecticism as well as the oriental style, in particular by the Moorish style.

He worked on multiple occasions for the Crespi family, wealthy industrial cotton producers, for whom he designed Villa Pia in Orta San Giulio (now Hotel Villa Crespi) which is a typical example of the influence of the Moorish style, incorporating the presence of a minaret. He worked mainly in Milan, where he designed the restoration of San Giovanni's Church and the reconstruction of the facade of San Calimero's Church. Ernesto Pirovano, who designed the Cemeteries of Mantova and Bergamo, was one of his pupils.

=== Ernesto Pirovano ===
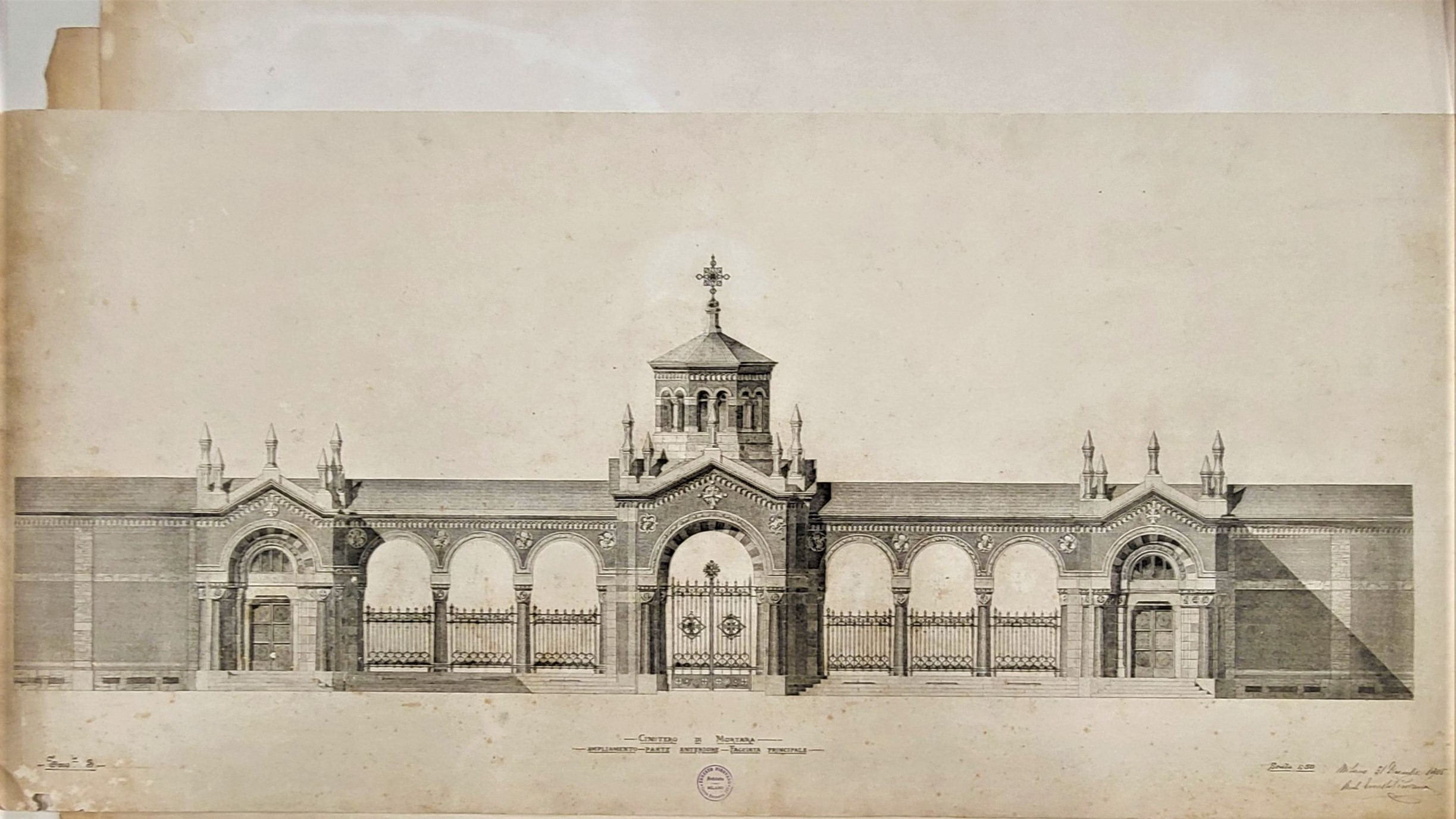
Architect Ernesto Pirovano's original drawing of the entrance facade of the Monumental Cemetery of Mortara

Ernesto Pirovano (1866–1934) was an Italian architect. His main works can be found in Lombardy. He is known to have had an eclectic approach to art after being a student of the architect Angelo Colla. The years of study with Colla influenced his style and allowed him to work on the restoration of the Basilica of San Calimero and the facade of the Church of Santa Maria al Paradiso. Through Colla, Pirovano came into contact with the Crespi family, for whom he completed a villa in Orta San Giulio (1892–1894), another villa in Crespi d'Adda (1894), a building in via Borgonuovo in Milan (1895–1896), and the urban and architectural design of the workers' village of Crespi d'Adda. He also took part in the project for the facade of Palazzo Nuovo and Monumental Cemetery of Bergamo, providing an Assyrian-Babylonian style to the monuments. Pirovano contributed to the realization of Mantova's Cemetery and the Monumental Cemetery of Bergamo. One of his works that remains the most relevant is the design of the industrial village of Crespi d'Adda, which has become a UNESCO World Heritage Site.

=== Architecture ===
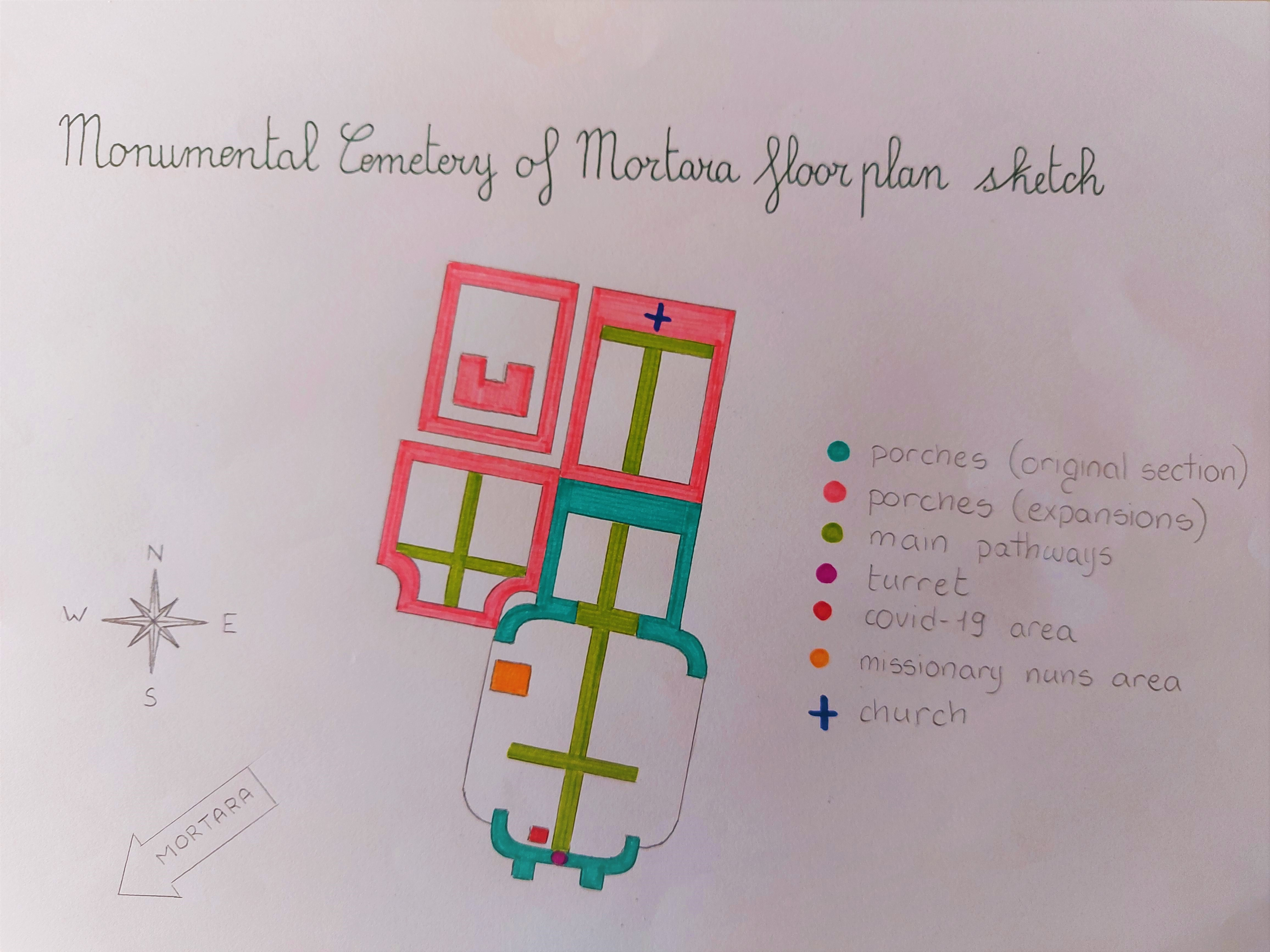
Floor plan sketch of the Monumental Cemetery of Mortara, Italy

The floor plan of the Monumental Cemetery of Mortara is divided into five square-shaped areas, two of them are from the main original layout, and the rest are the result of the expansions. Each section is delimited by a concrete and brick wall and an intricate structure of porches and arcades at the entrances and by the chapels (dedicated sections for the family graves). The original section is inspired by the baroque architecture following the typical strict symmetrical plan, and the colonnades were designed to make the Cemetery appear spacious and monumental.

The vertical structures consist of elegant terracotta-brick columns that support carved and adorned concrete arches. The granite capitals are decorated with rosettes that differ on the columns. When in some sections the porch is composed of two archways delimited by three sets of arcades (creating a set of bohemian vaults), the capitals at the centre are more detailed and showcase carved acanthus leaves and small faces. The white impost blocks have a minimal black decor on the bottom, and the voussoirs, also called archivolts, are decorated with an intricate naturalistic motif. The ceiling of the porches is painted in blue, yellow, orange, and red with a design resembling the sky on the vaults, and a geometric pattern on the intrados.

The roof cover structure is made of larch and fir wood supported by iron brackets. The gable stones between the roof and the archivolts are made with textured terracotta bricks, set with concrete rosettes, that also, in this case, have various designs but are positioned in symmetrical order, and geometric terracotta fretwork outlines the shape of the top of the facade of the Cemetery. The roof tiles are also made of terracotta, and the edges of the roof are outlined by a set of small concrete chimney-looking cylindrical pinnacles with a conic top.

The main entrance is further embellished by an octagonal shape turret, which is built in pink and white concrete. Each of the eight sides hosts a mullioned window, and from the centre of the tower rises a metal cross. The ceiling of the turret is painted in a similar style as the porches and represents a dove at the centre of a large sun on a blue background. The Cemetery also hosts a small church that is positioned at the far end of the expansion adjacent to the old section, located at the far end of the pathway from the main entrance. The church door is made of glass and wrought iron, representing some angels and Latin text.

Close-up on the main architectural features

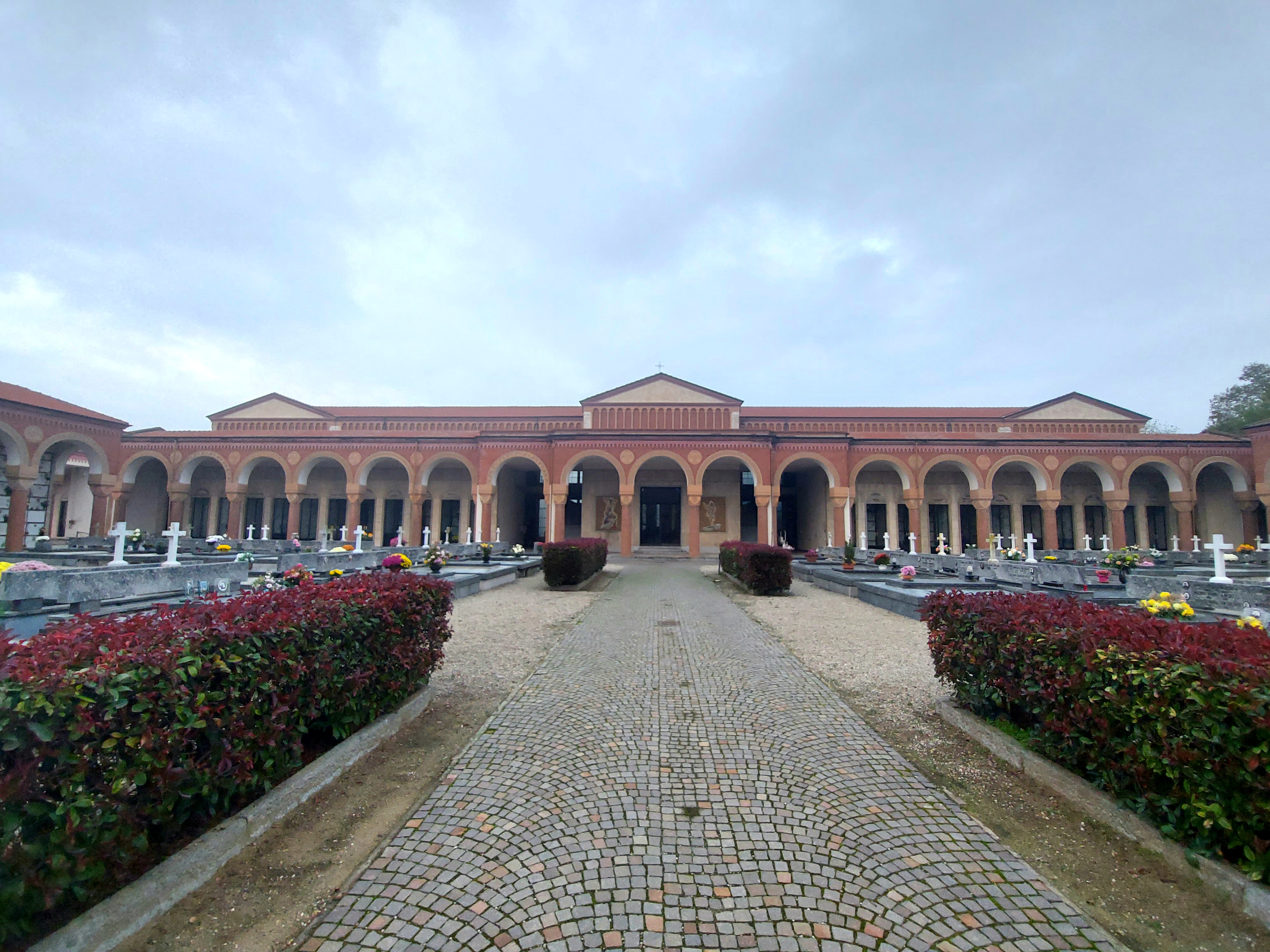
Symmetrical arches and the entrance to the church

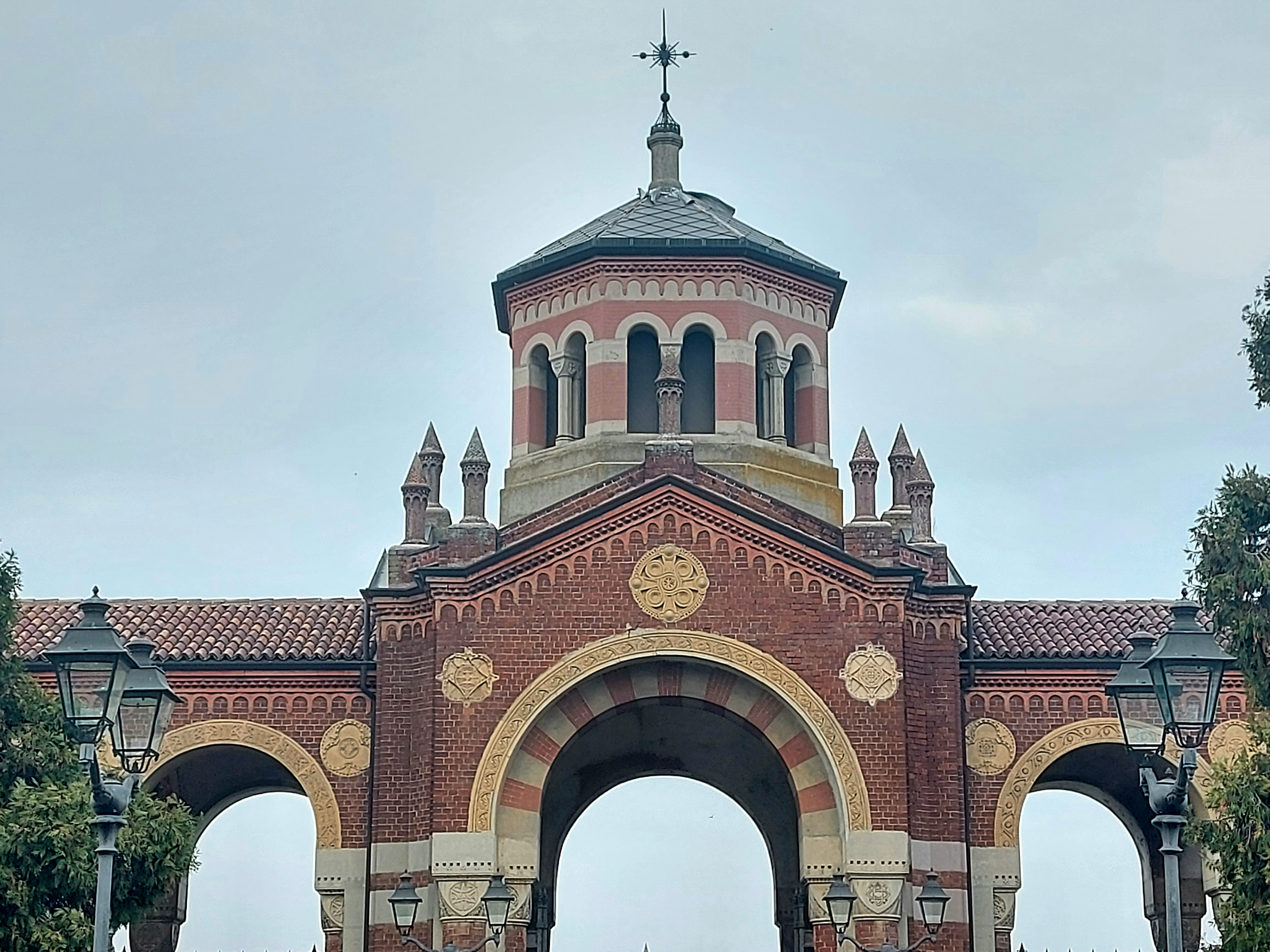
Close-up of the main entrance

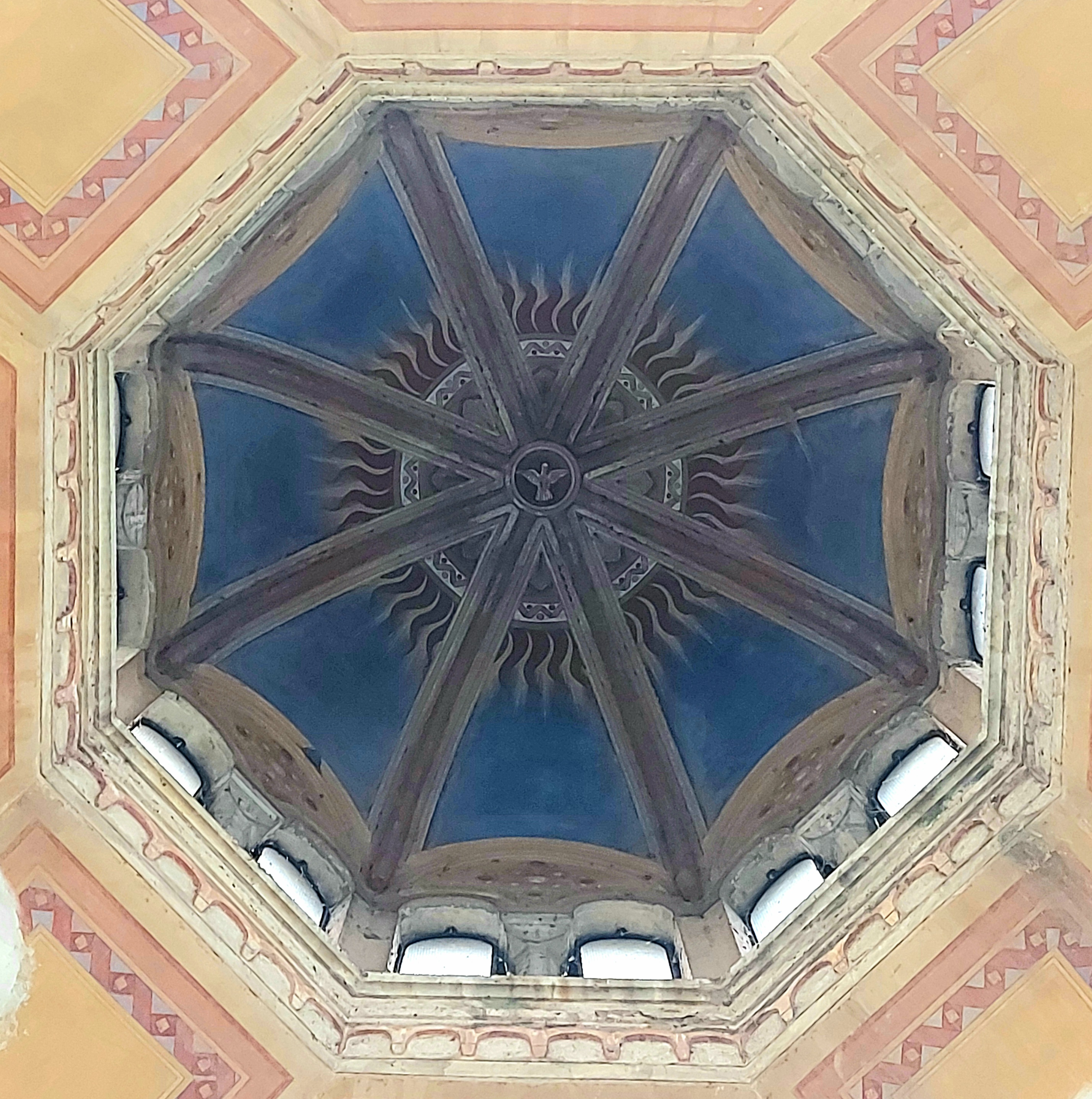
The vault of the turret

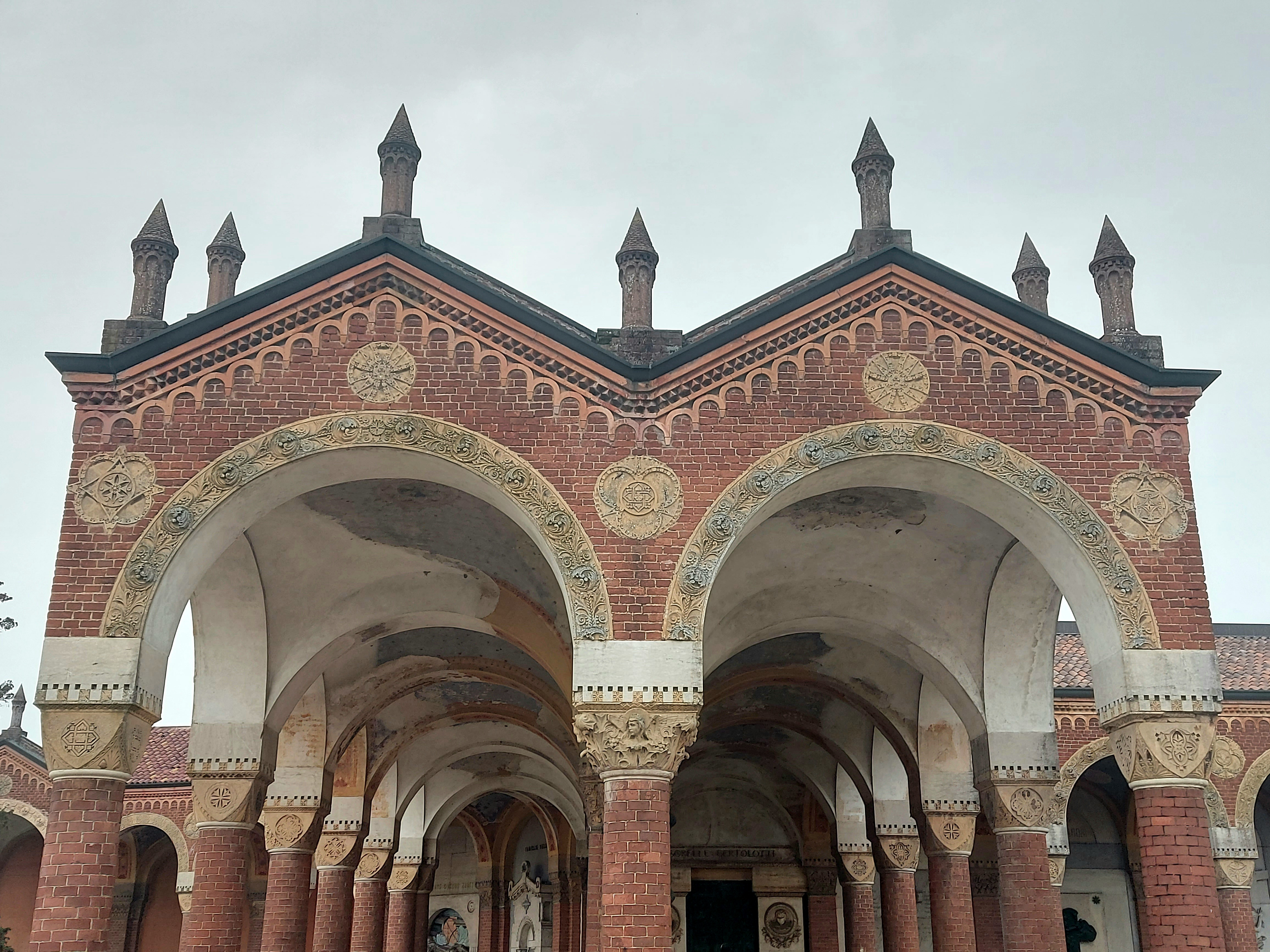
Close-up of the porches

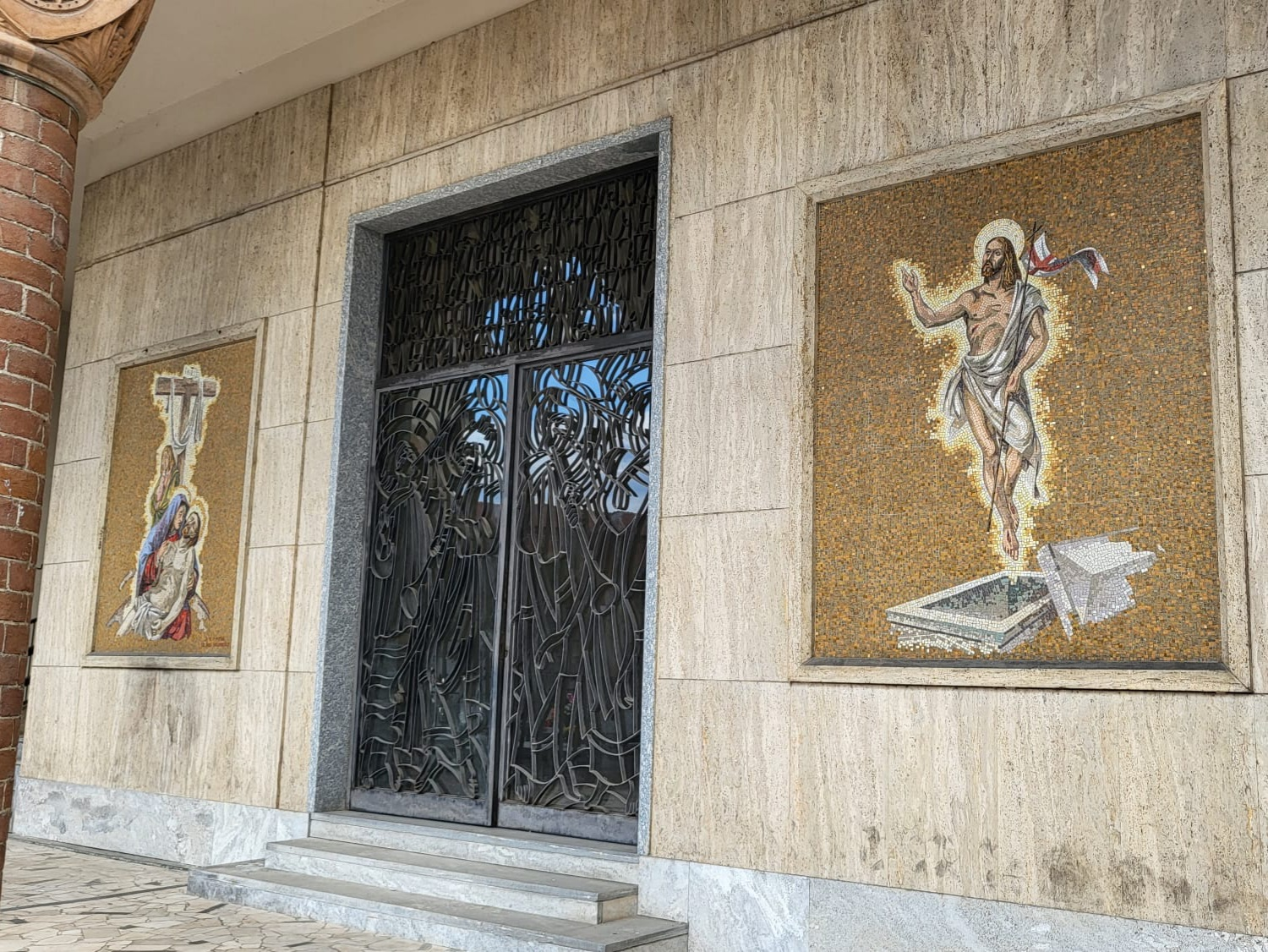
The church's entrance

The graves are positioned in order alongside the main path that crosses the entire length of the Cemetery. The more complex and elaborate ones are located underneath the porches by the chapels. The chapels are sections that are primarily dedicated to family graves and are located along the perimeter of the old area. They are divided into left and right porches and are often accompanied by paintings, sculptures, and commemorative texts in memory of the people that have died. The Cemetery also includes two underground areas (long corridors) that contain some of the eldest graves which have text written in Latin, with Roman numbers and that follow the Roman calendar. It also includes a section dedicated to the soldiers that died during World War I, a section dedicated to the people from the city that have been executed, and another area dedicated to missionary nuns.

== Sculptures, paintings and mosaics ==
The brothers Felice and Ferdinando Bialetti created the main sculptures and paintings in the Cemetery.

=== Sculptures ===
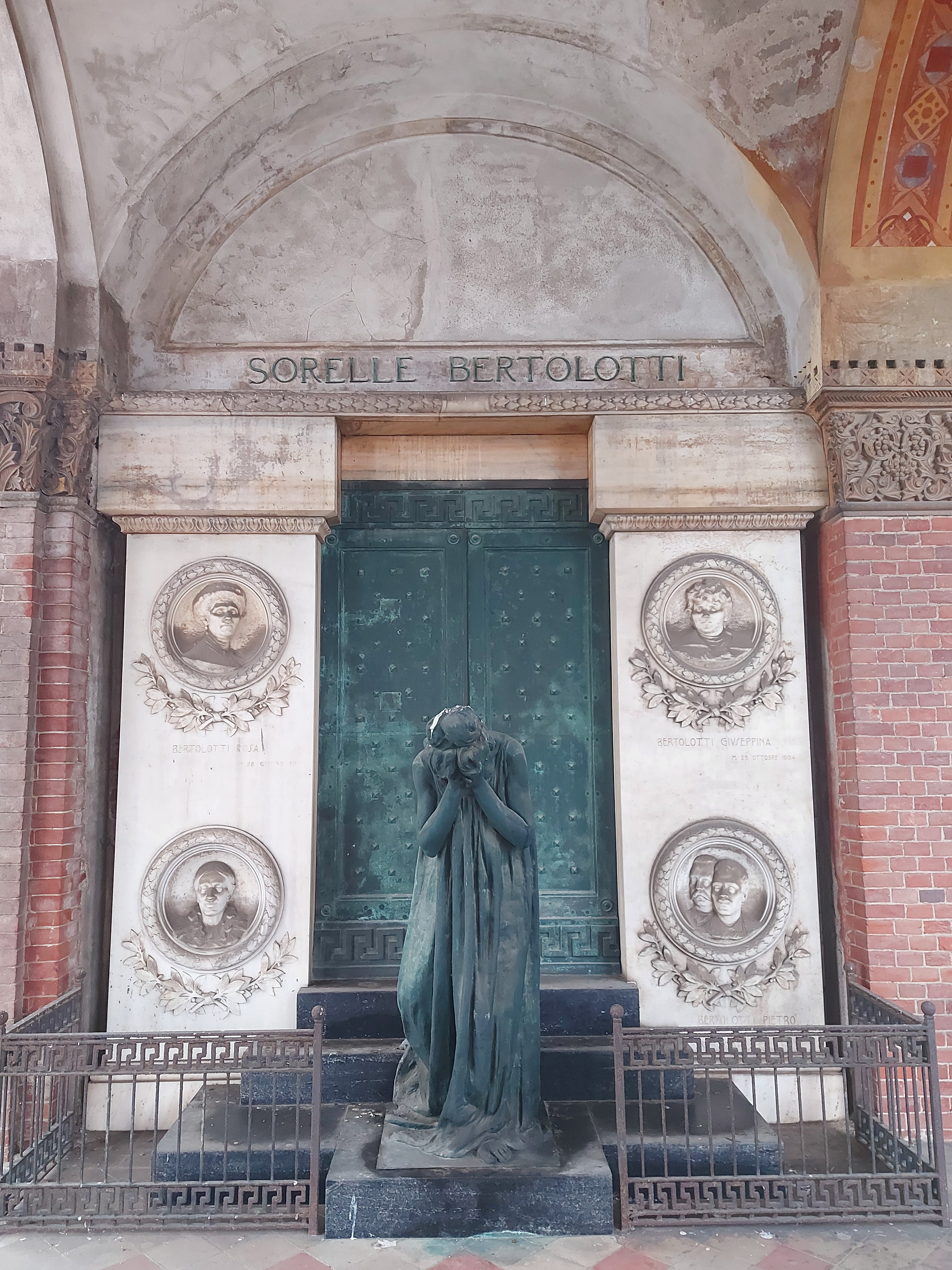
Bertolotti family grave at the Monumental Cemetery of Mortara

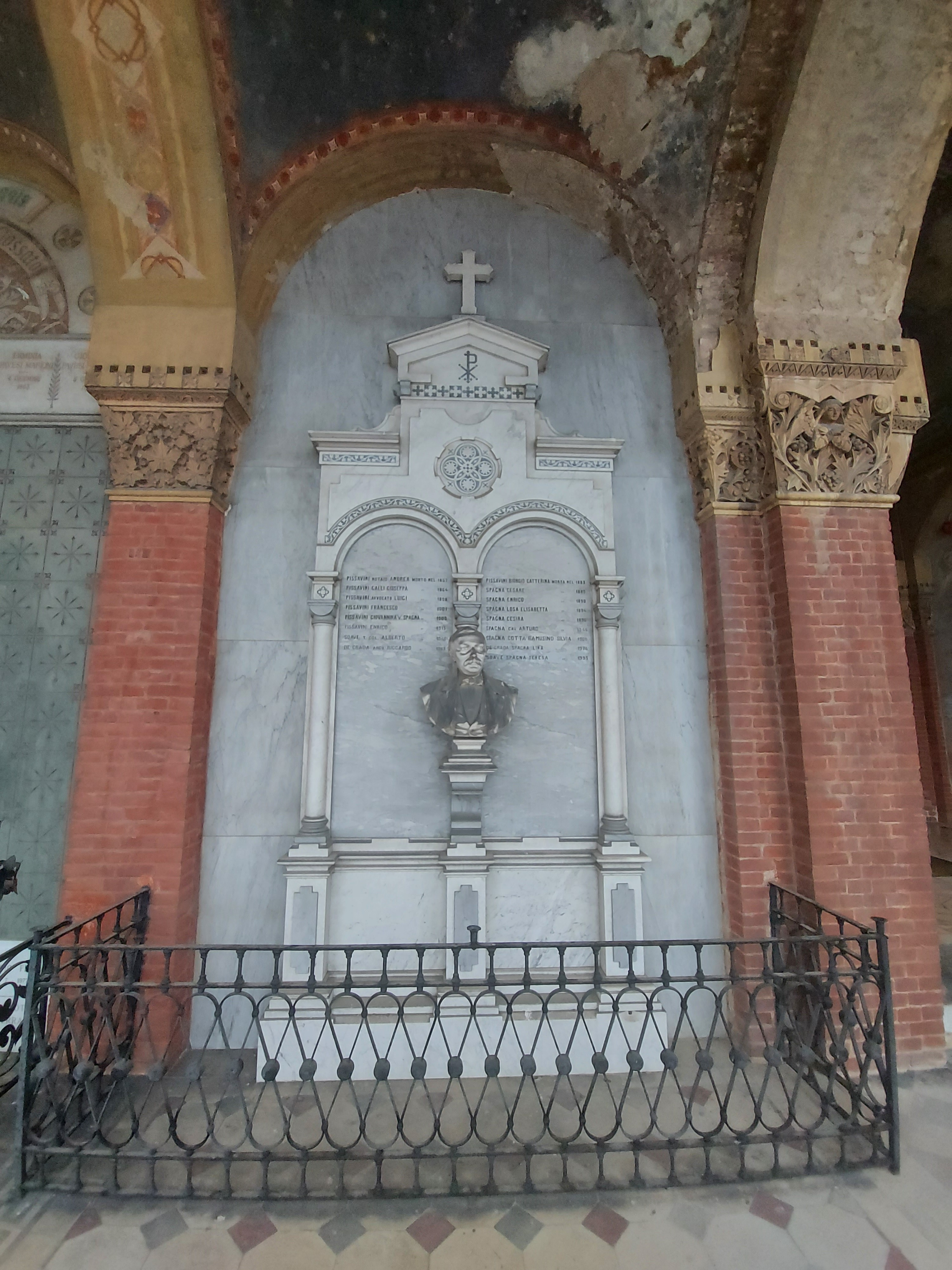
Pissavini Spagna family grave at the Monumental Cemetery of Mortara

Felice Bialetti (1869–1906) attended the Accademia Albertina in Turin, where he specialized in funerary works. He met and co-elaborated with several famous sculptors, including Odoardo Tabacchi and Enrico Butti. Some of his works are preserved in the Galleria d'Arte Moderna in Milan, including his most famous sculpture, entitled "Pensiero Dominate". The sculptures he created for the Monumental Cemetery of Mortara are:

- A sculptural group composed of a bronze statue and six medallions with portraits, in the chapel belonging to the Nai family;
- Two bronze busts in the chapel of the Molina family;
- A bronze sculpture in the chapel of the Bossi family, representing the allegory of the soul rising towards Heaven; and a bas-relief representing two biblical scenes in the same chapel;
- A cross surrounded by a branch of thorns in the chapel of the Banchi Cesare family. The engraved decorations recall the floral motifs characteristic of the Art Nouveau style, which influenced the artist;
- A female sculpture in bronze in the chapel of the Bertolotti sisters;
- A bust in the chapel of the Pissavini-Spagna families.

=== Paintings ===
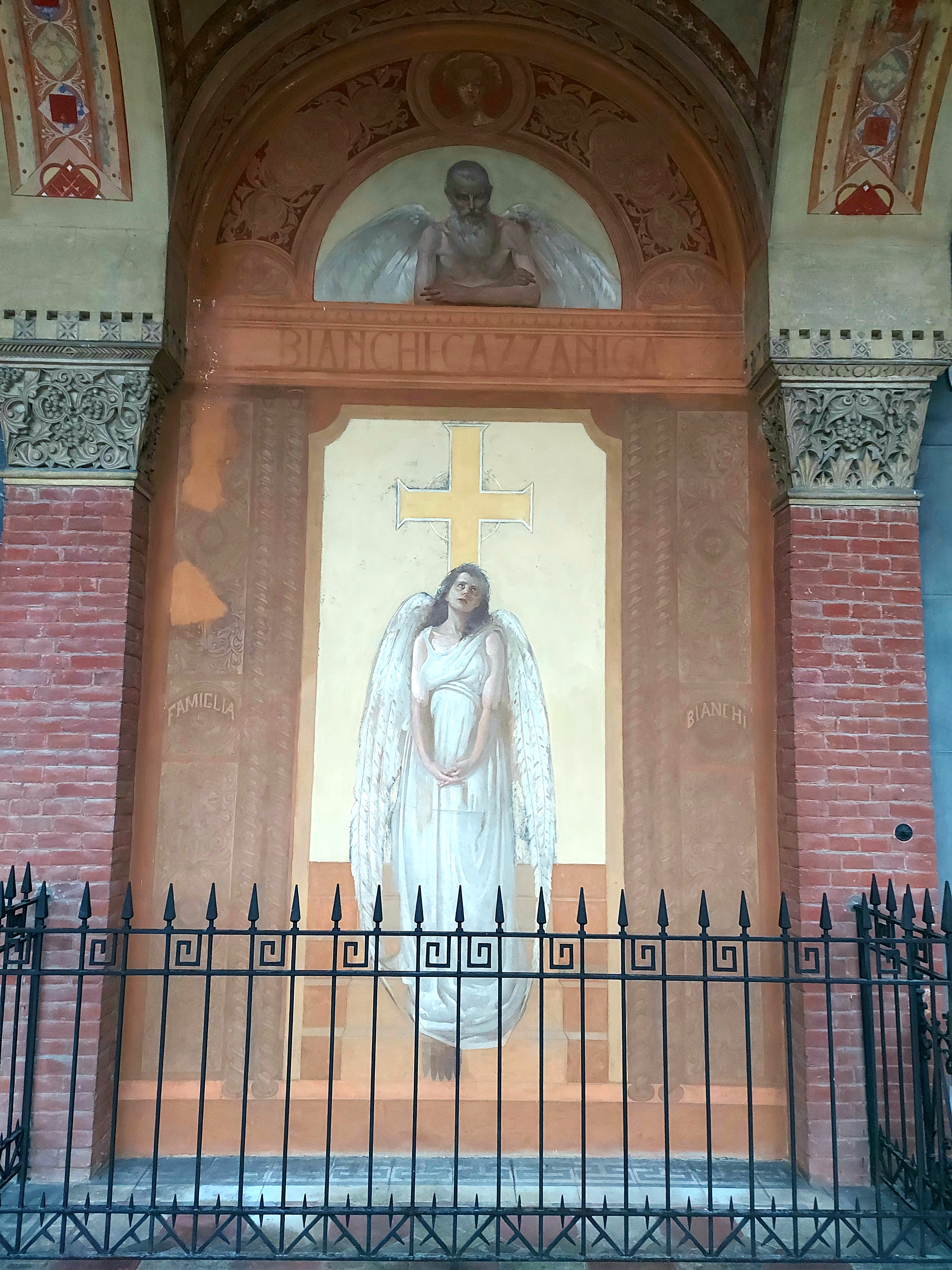
Bianchi family grave (Monumental Cemetery of Mortara, Italy)

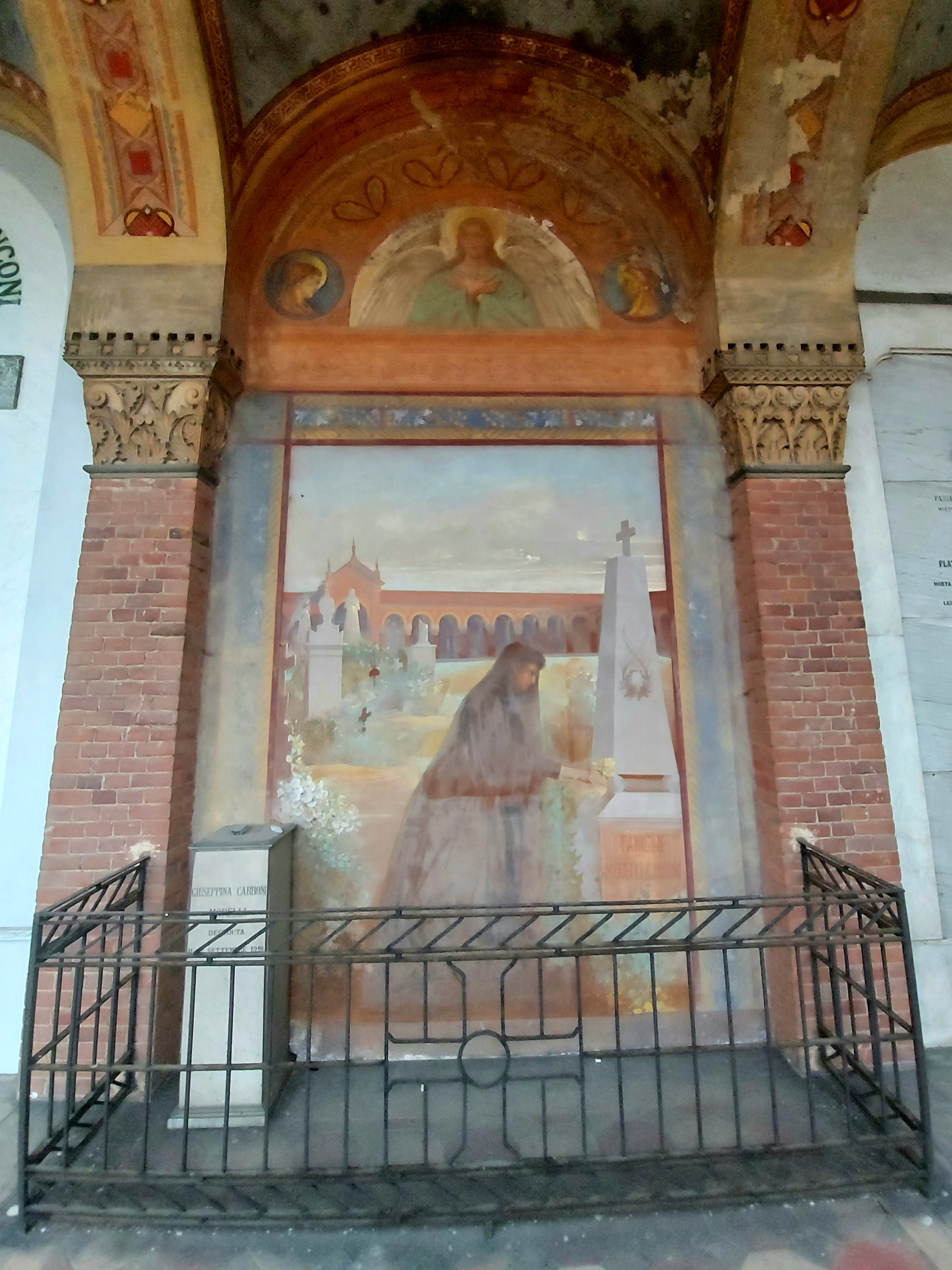
Morelli-Carboni family grave (Monumental Cemetery of Mortara, Italy)

Ferdinando Bialetti (1864–1958) attended the Accademia Albertina and was an honorary member of the Brera Academy. His frescoes can be found in the Teatro Olimpico in Vicenza, in the Palazzo San Giorgio in Genoa and in the Pinacoteca in Turin. The paintings he created for the Monumental Cemetery of Mortara are:

- A fresco depicting two angels looking at each other in the front wall of the chapel belonging to the Bianchi family. One is in front of a cross, on a monochromatic background, and the second one is elder in age and is painted as a half-bust located above the first angel;
- A fresco depicting a woman dressed in black placing a flower on a tomb, in the chapel of the Morelli-Carboni families. In the background is depicted the right side of the arcade of the Monumental Cemetery of Mortara. In the same chapel, a lunette contains an angel between two rounds, each containing a portrait;
- Two portraits representing the general Giulio Cesare Carboni and his wife.

=== Other sculptures and paintings ===
- A marble sculpture depicting a woman kneeling in prayer, made by the sculptor Gaudenzio Rossi;
- Six medallions made by Guadenzio Rossi, each containing a portrait, arranged around a marble cross in the chapel of the Tessera family;
- A bas-relief in white marble depicting a woman praying, on which the author has placed the autograph, which is indecipherable;
- A round with portrait made by the painter Silvio Santagostino, in the crypt of the Goia family;
- A marble sculpture In the chapel of the lawyer Zanetti, which represents the allegory of the grieving;
- Medallions with portraits in the chapel of the Bertolotti sisters made by the sculptor Francesco Barzaghi;
- A bas-relief in white marble on the wall of Ernesto Giardini's chapel, depicting a kneeling woman embracing the cross, in front of which there is a broken flower;
- The crypt of the Previdere-Pezza families, made by the sculptor Filippo Omegna, has a white marble floor, and a bronze sculpture of St. Francis.

=== Mosaics ===
In the cemetery there are several detailed mosaics:

- On the left side of the entrance to the church there is a mosaic representing Jesus that died crucified on a golden background;
- On the right side of the entrance to the church there is a mosaic representing risen Jesus on a golden background;
- The Bonacasa family grave includes a very colourful mosaic representing a cross;
- The vault of the Gianzana family grave is adorned with a mosaic representing a lamb holding a flag on a light blue background with golden decors;
Mosaics

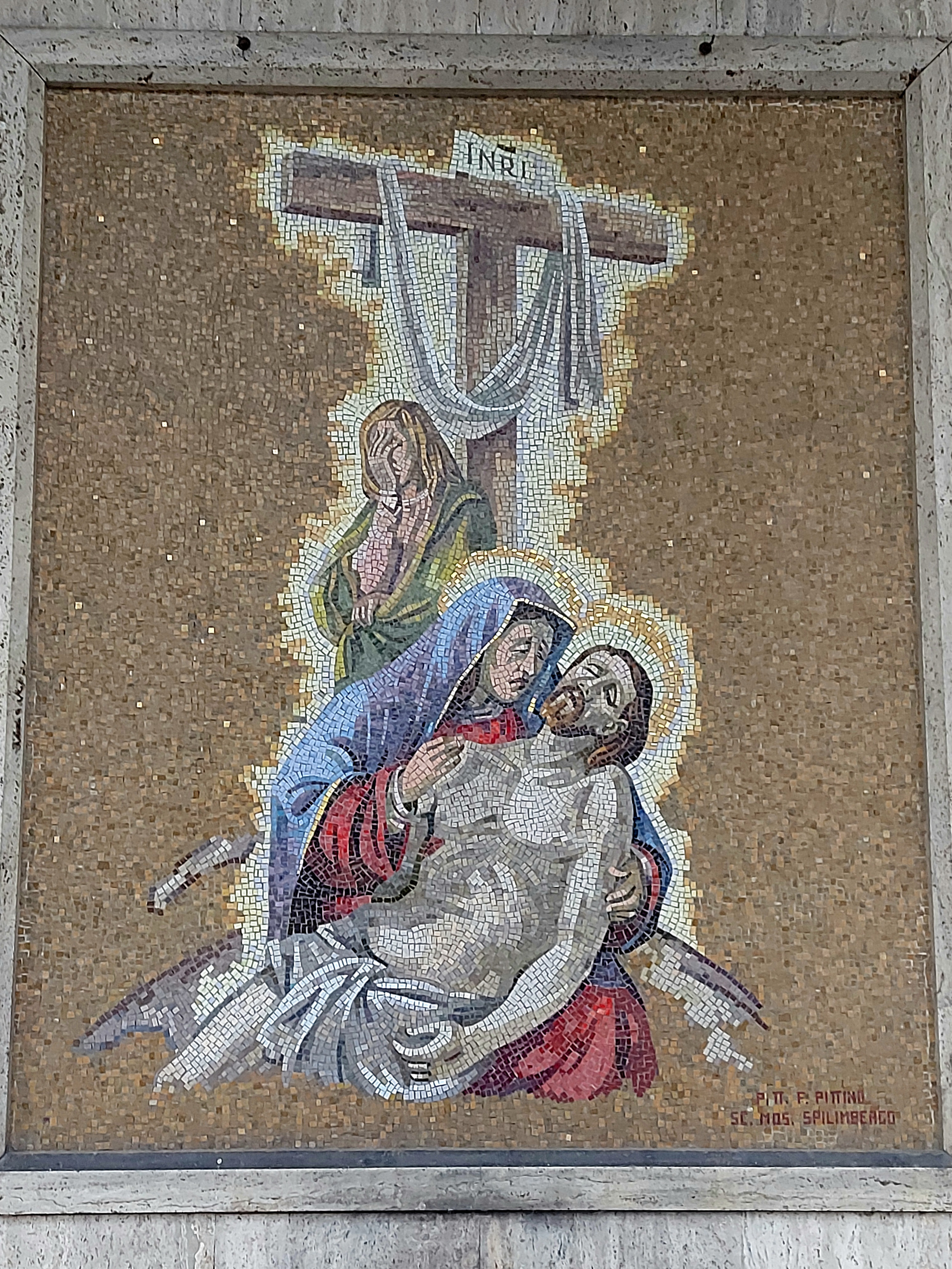
Mosaic on the left side of the entrance to the church representing Jesus died by crucifixion

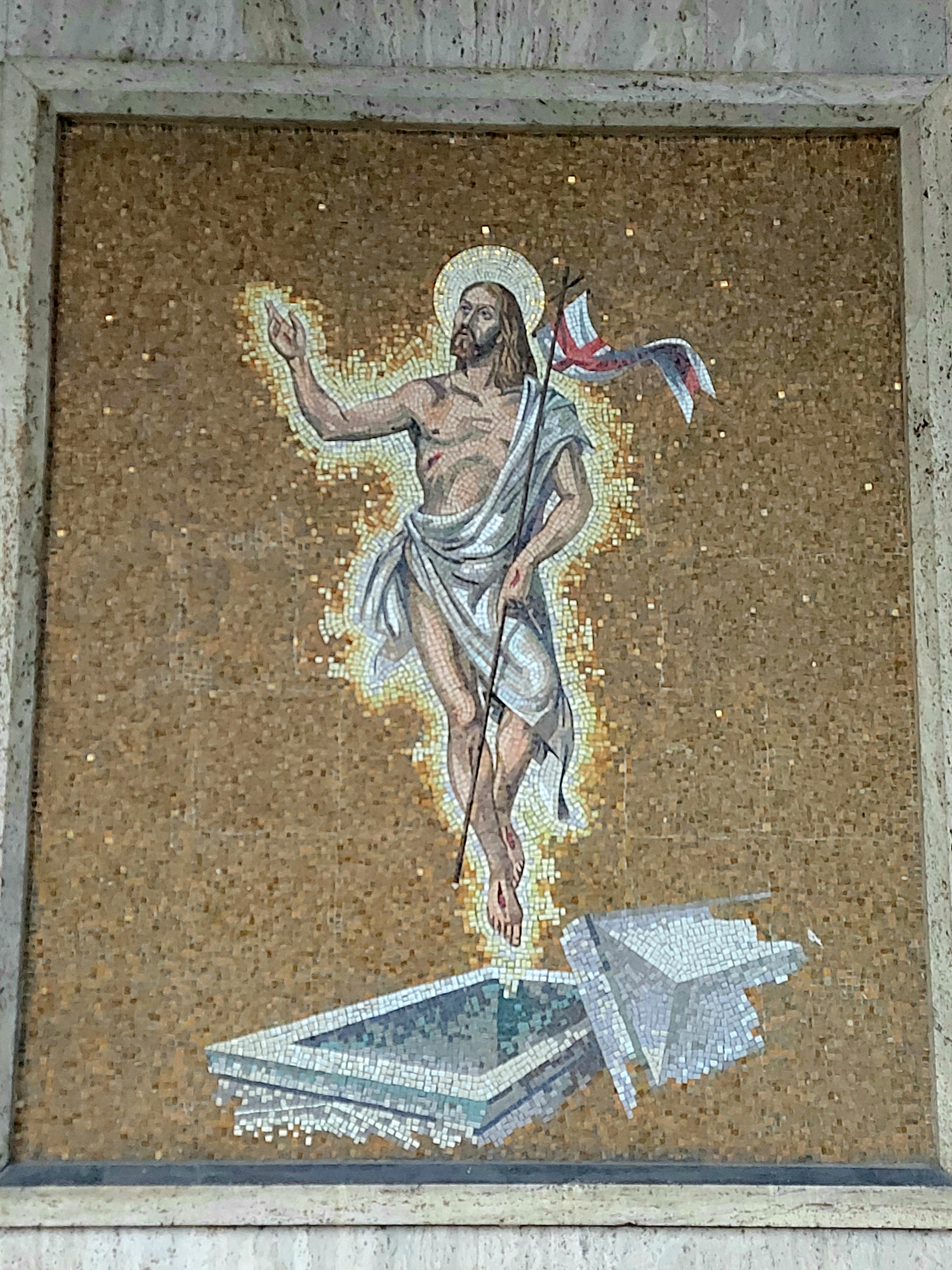
Mosaic on the right side of the entrance to the church representing the resurrection of Jesus

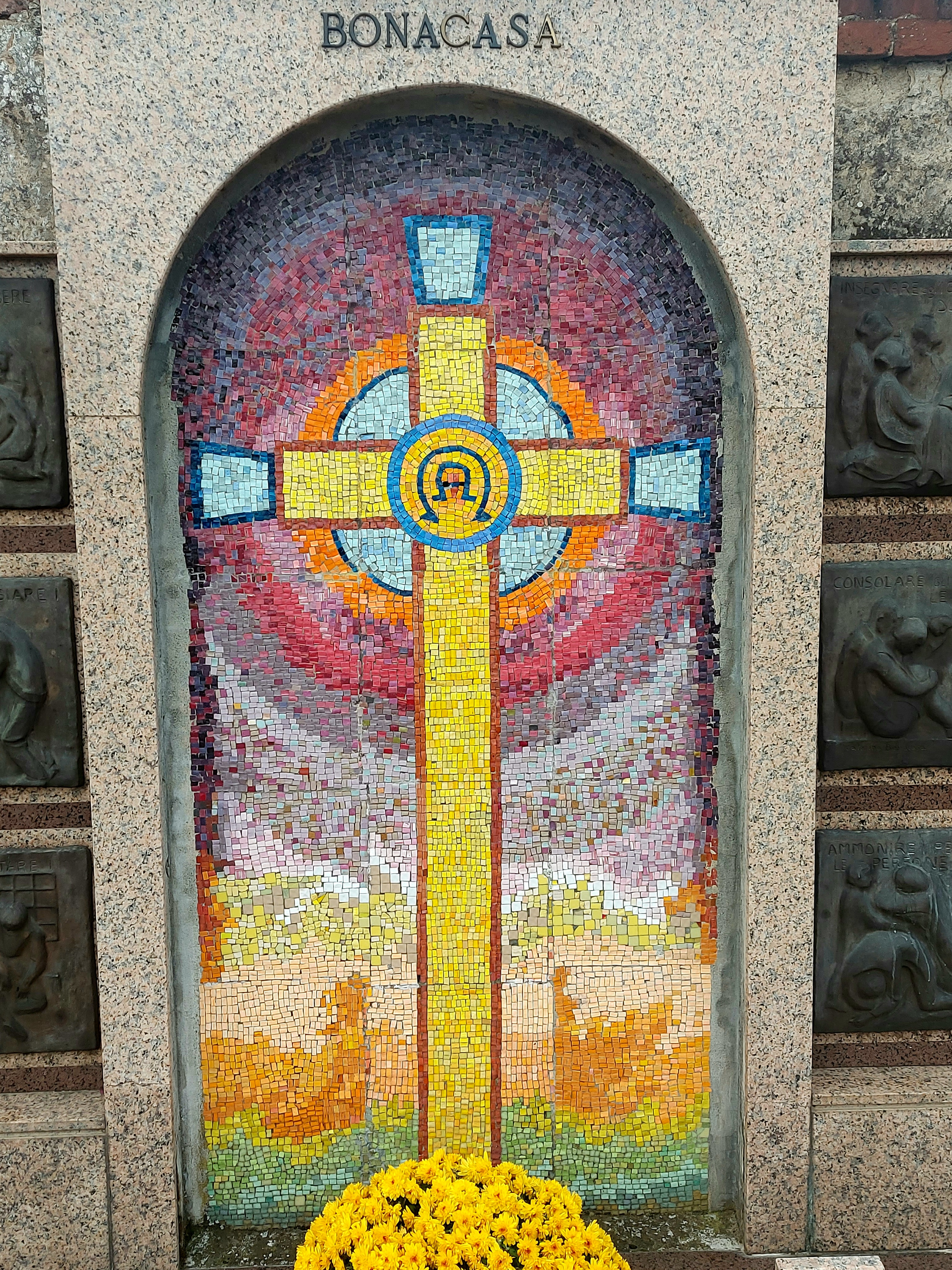
The colourful mosaic representing a cross of the Bonacasa family grave

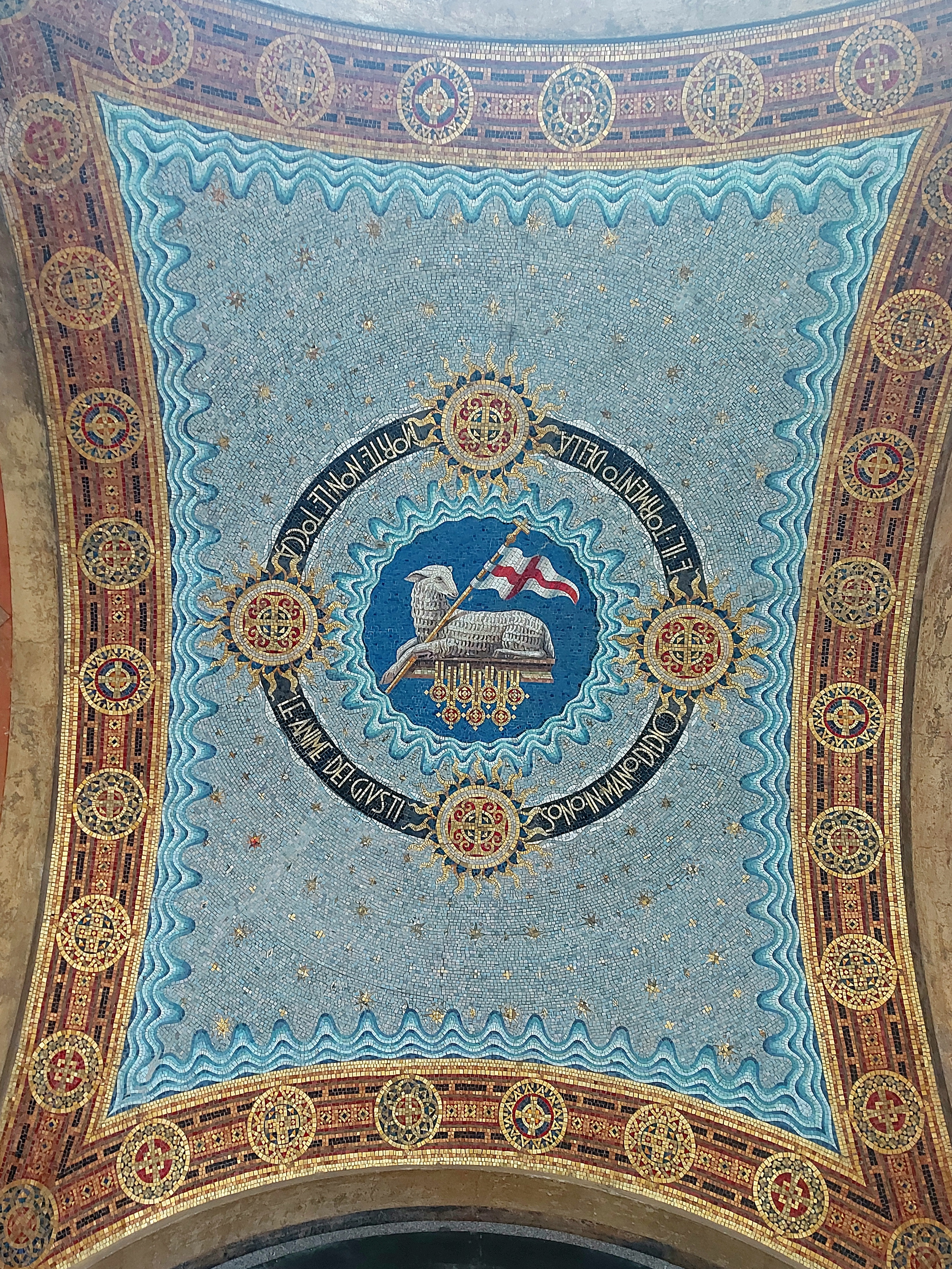
The mosaic of the vault of the Gianzana family grave representing a lamb holding a flag

== Famous burials ==
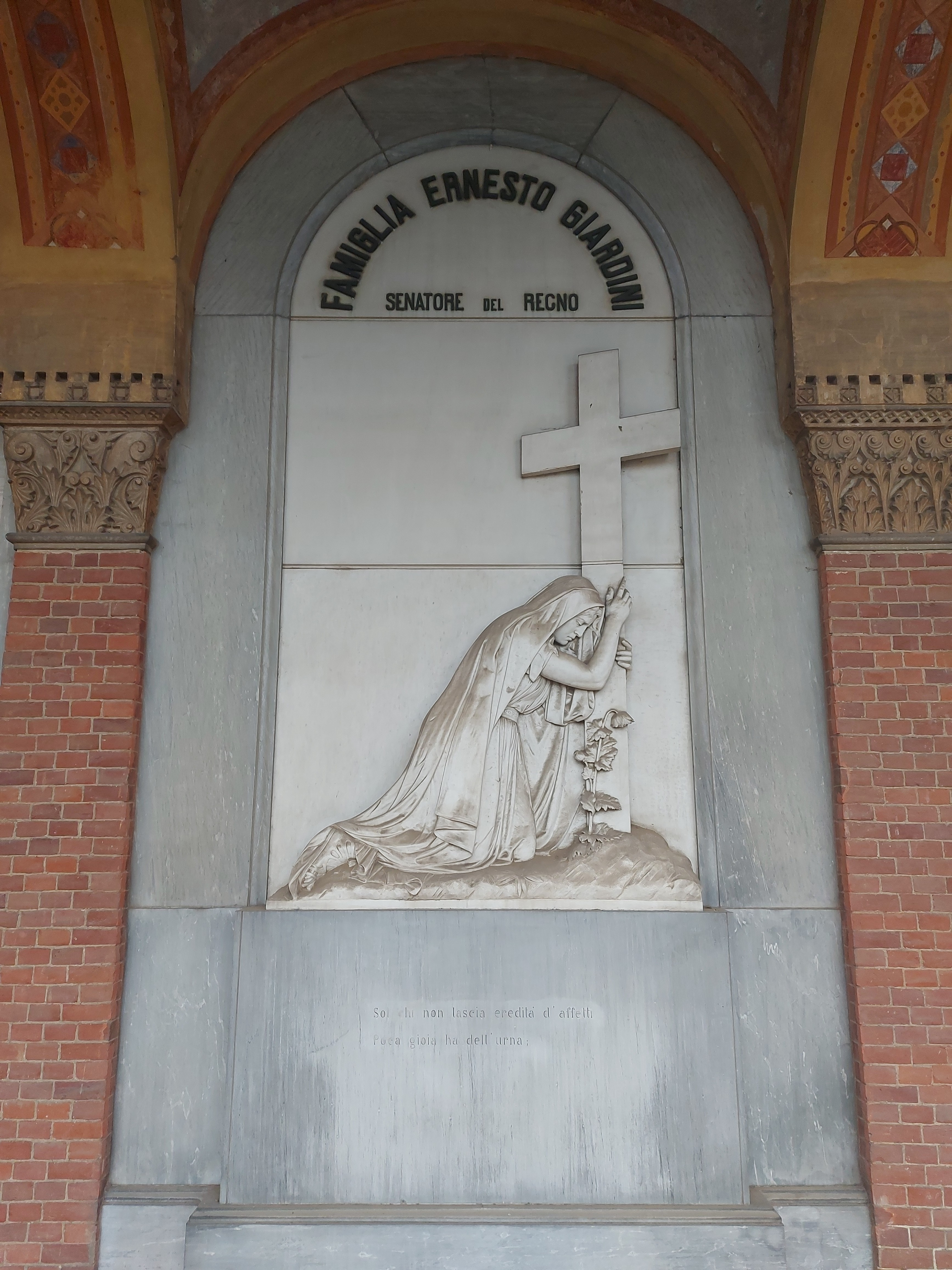
Ernesto Giardini family grave

A number of notable people are interred in the Cemetery, including:

- Clotilde Pavesi Cavaglià (1839–1916) – noblewoman and poet. She contributed to the creation of the hospital Sant'Ambrogio of Mortara. In her family's chapel, the sculptor Gaudenzio Rossi from Novara depicted her kneeling in prayer in a white marble sculpture;
- Cortellona Alceste (1824–1895) – artist;
- Capettini Arturo (1900–1943) – antifascist militant who won a gold medal for the Italian resistance movement;
- Capettini Cesare (1909–1945) – antifascist militant who won a gold medal for the Italian resistance movement;
- Carboni Giulio Cesare (1897–1940) – general;
- Giardini Ernesto (1869–1961) – founder of the People's Bank of Lomellina and Senator of the Kingdom of Italy;
- Tessera Enrico (1828–1894) – historian, author of a five-volume work about the history of the city of Mortara.

== Areas ==
=== Soldiers' graves ===
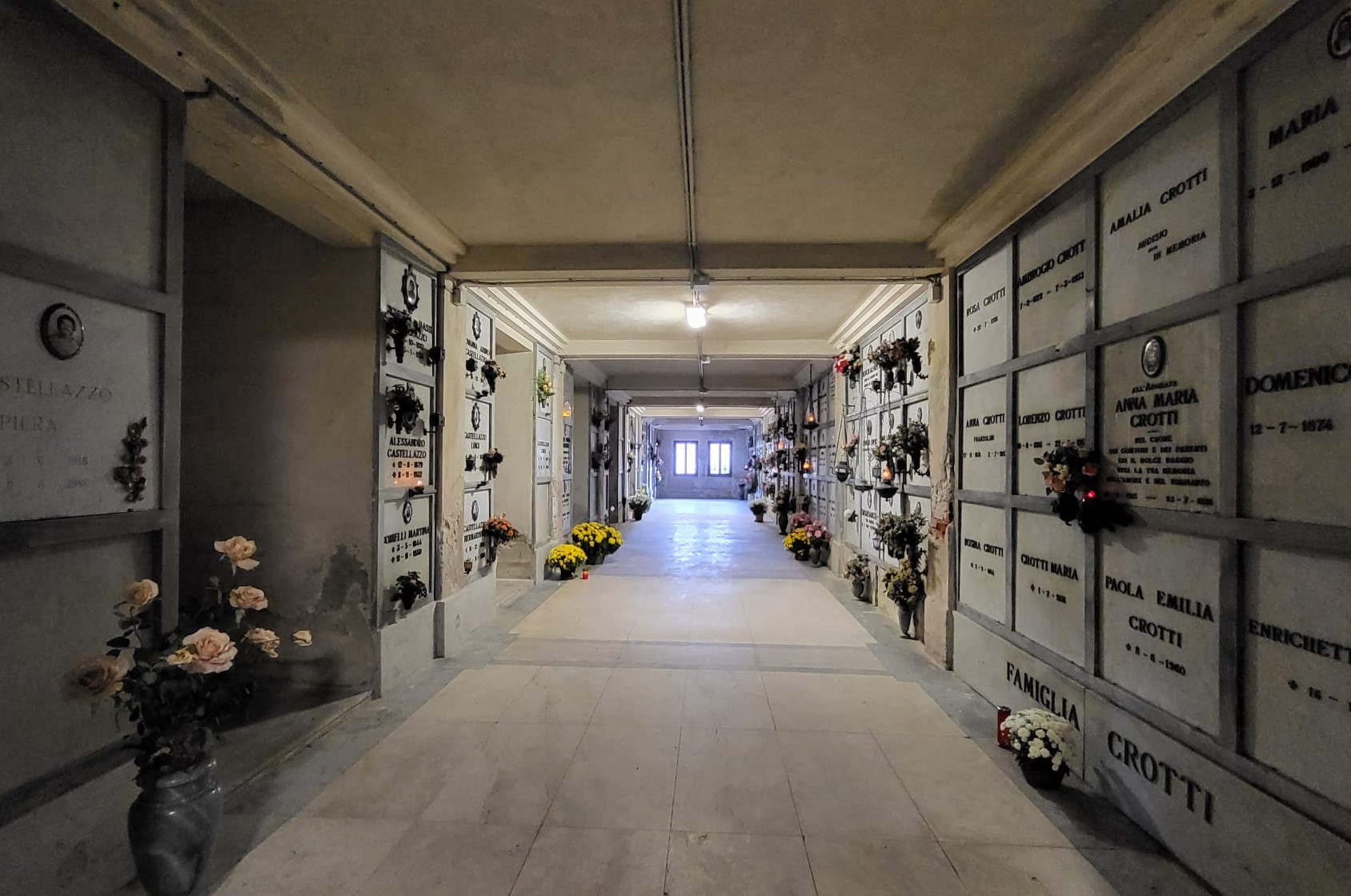
The soldiers' graves in the Monumental Cemetery of Mortara, Italy

In the Cemetery, there is a large number of graves of soldiers who died during World War I. The majority of these died in the hospital of Mortara but were not local residents. In the Cemetery, there are two niches in the central arch and a commemorative plaque of the soldiers interred there. The plaque bears the inscription: "Ai gloriosi soldati caduti nella Grande Guerra e sepolti in questo cimitero I mortaresi riconoscenti", which means: "To the glorious soldiers fallen in the Great War and buried in this cemetery The grateful mortars". Soldiers buried in Cemetery include, in chronological order:

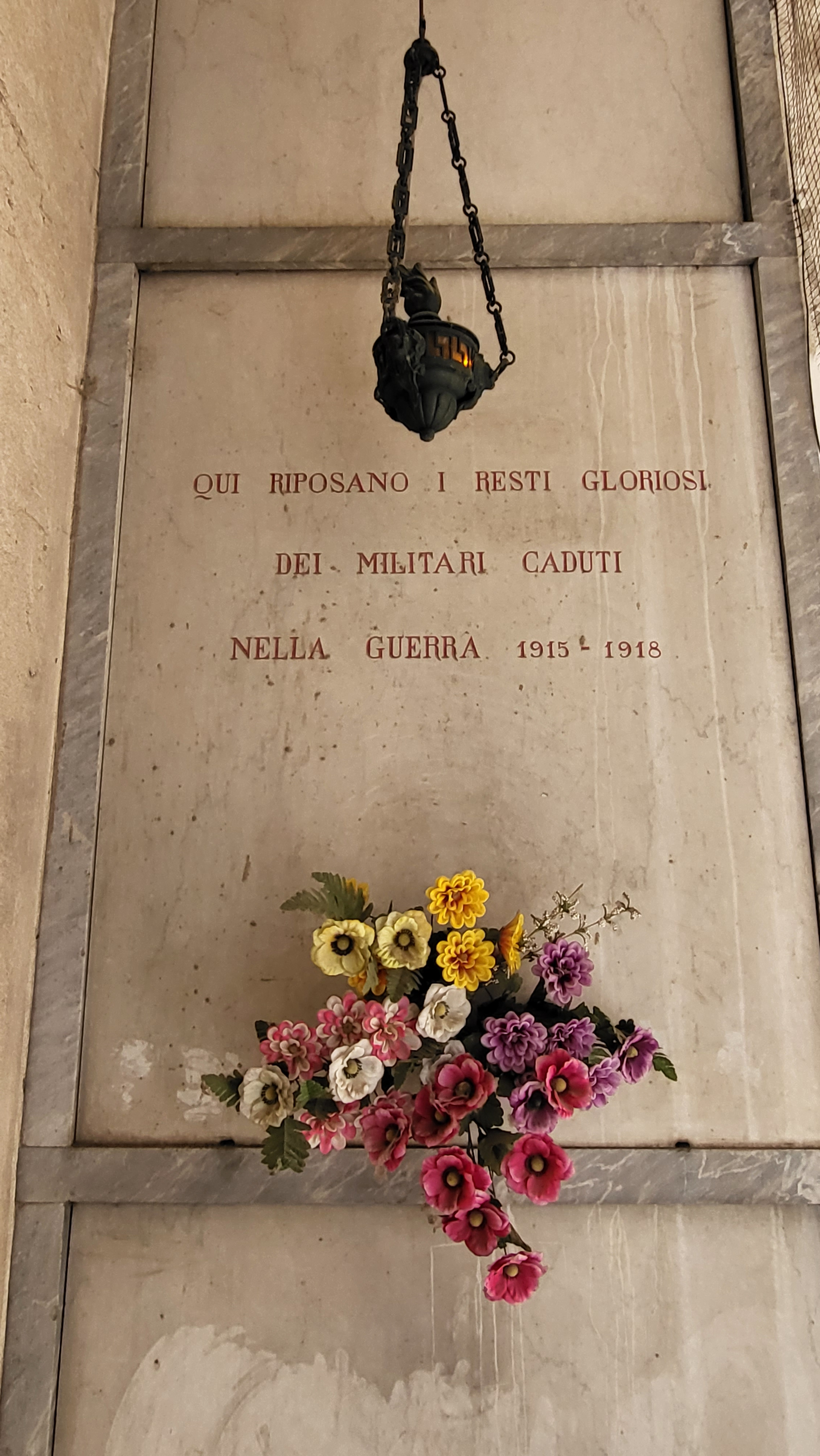
Soldiers' locus in the Monumental Cemetery of Mortara, Italy (inscription: "Here lie the glorious remains of the militaries fallen in the war 1915–1918")

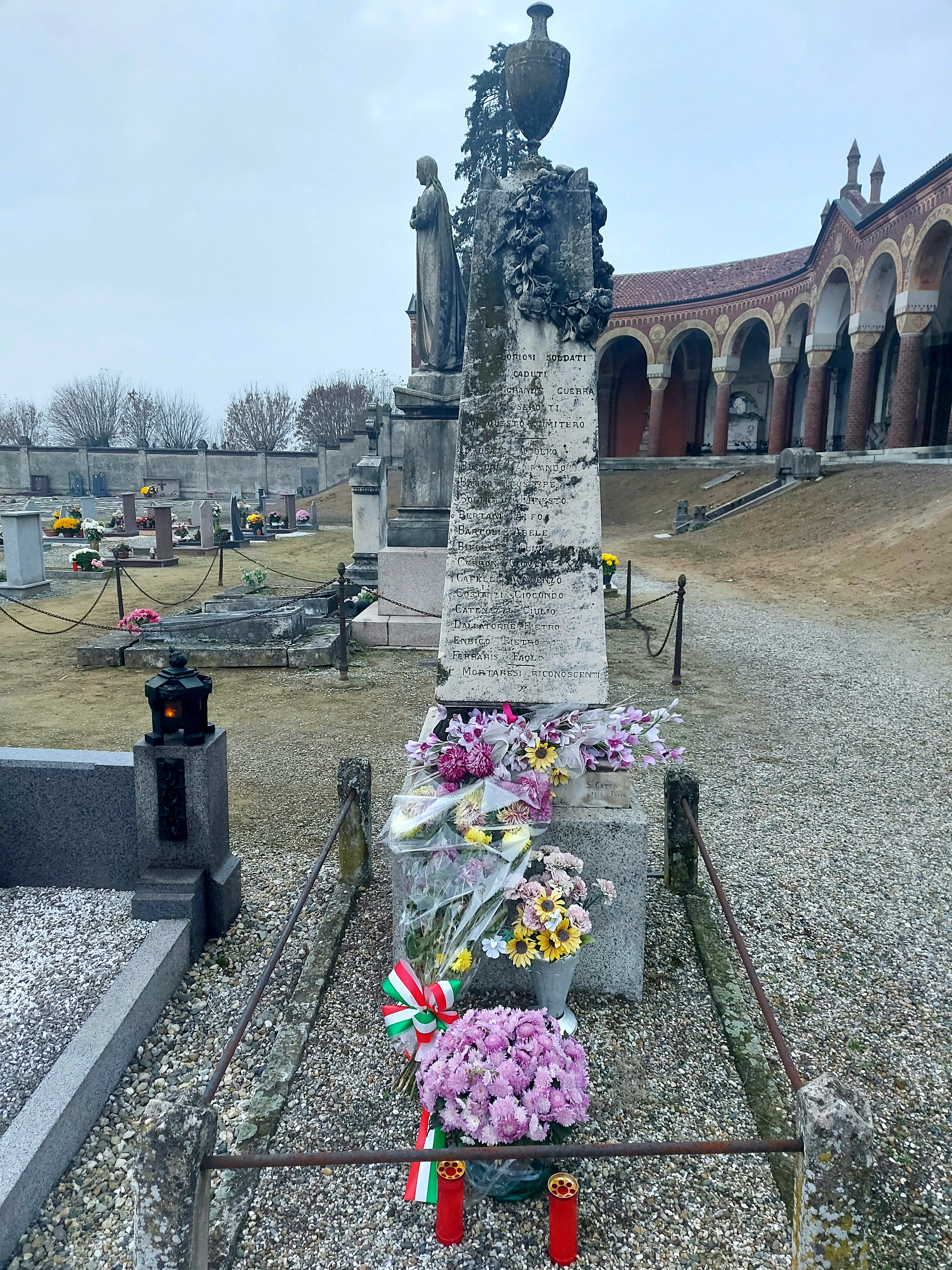
World War I remembrance tombstone (Monumental Cemetery of Mortara, Italy)

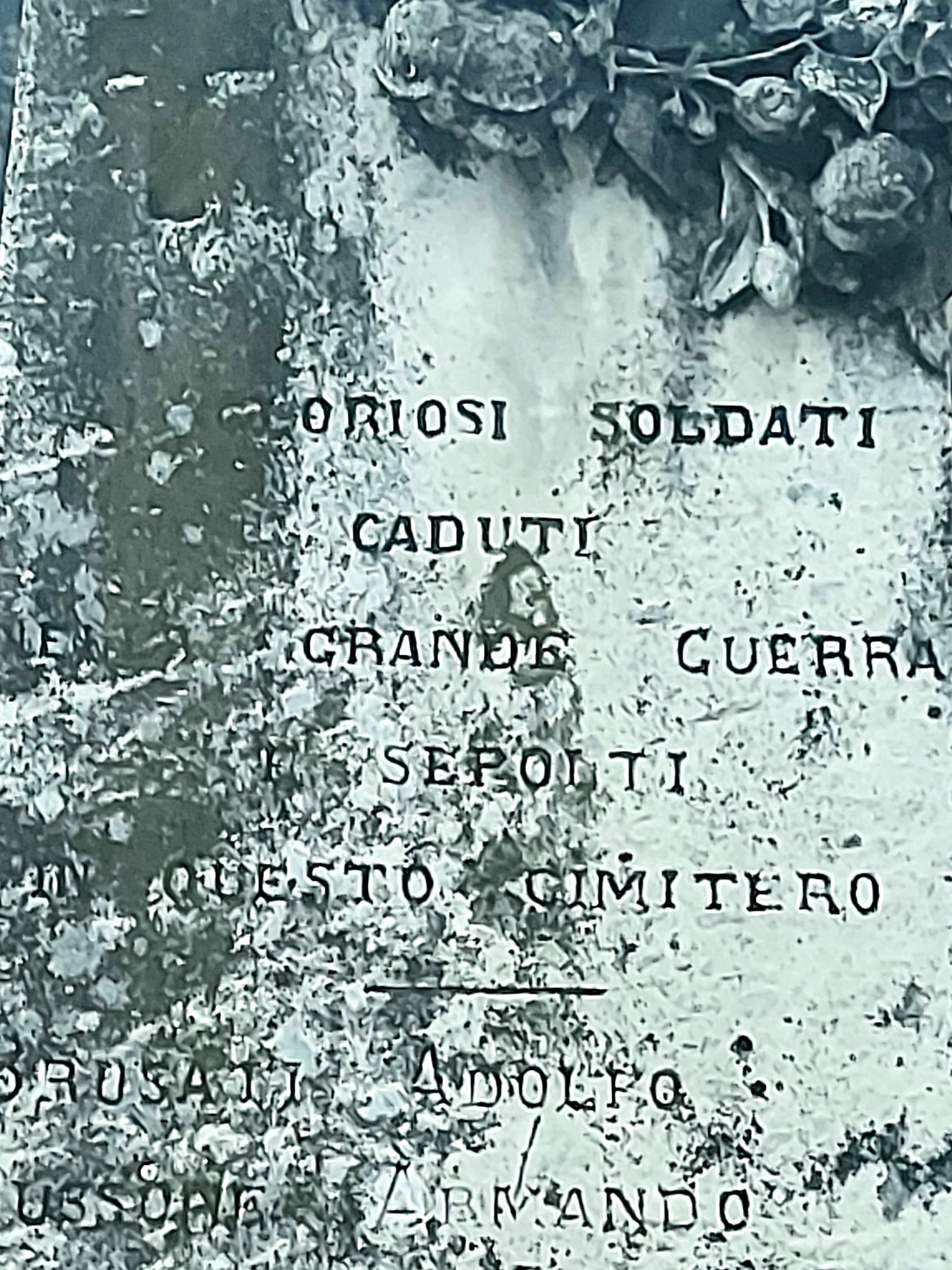
World War I remembrance tombstone, close-up on the text (Monumental Cemetery of Mortara, Italy)

Name	Birth	Death
Gatti Giovanni di Lorenzo	26 March 1888	27 July 1915
Olivelli Luigi Giuseppe di Pietro Angelo e di Fugazza Ernesta	7 February 1895	12 December 1915
Stangalino Carlo di Lorenzo (Stangalini Carlo)	16 February 1895	9 June 1916
Brusati Rodolfo di Giuseppe (Adolfo)	21 December 1890	1 June 1917
Barba Giuseppe di Luigi	7 April 1891	17 June 1917
Ferraris Paolo	29 June 1887	19 December 1917
Picillo Vitalino di Luigi	12 January 1899	29 December 1917
Pesce Attilio di Giuseppe	2 November 1897	15 April 1918
Viviani Carlo di Pietro	4 April 1882	23 May 1918
Segna Francesco di Pietro	14 February 1899	9 June 1918
Menghi Alfredo di Giovanni	16 April 1883	13 June 1918
Bifolchi Luigi di Domenico	unknown	11 July 1918
Piva Pietro Anacleto	1 May 1897	13 July 1918
Ceron Giovanni di Adamo (Cerron Giovanni)	27 September 1896	16 July 1918
Lionello Giuseppe di Michele	28 July 1885	6 August 1918
Ferraris Luigi Francesco di Pietro	6 November 1886	7 August 1918
Bartoli Abele di Pietro	4 December 1885	14 August 1918
Dalla Torre Pietro di Antonio	16 January 1899	31 August 1918
Ventura Pietro di Eliseo	29 June 1900	5 September 1918
Giribaldi Pietro di Serafino	21 June 1879	8 September 1918
Bertani Alfo di Giuseppe	31 October 1900	10 September 1918
Quetti Matteo di Domenico	16 August 1900	11 September 1918
Mingaro Adriano di Dario (Mincari Adriano)	1900	12 September 1918
Serra Pasquale	1900	17 September 1918
Lanzarini Pietro di Gaetano	29 June 1900	18 September 1918
Stanghelini Cesarino di Ferdinando (Stangalini Cesare)	18 September 1900	18 September 1918
Fugazza Luigi Giuseppe di Gaetano	12 May 1880	1 October 1918
Tosolini Carini di Romeo (Tosolino Carino)	1 May 1888	7 October 1918
Massari Arcangelo di Salvatore (Massaro Arcangelo)	6 February 1888	9 October 1918
Toffaloni Giovanni di Giuseppe	30 March 1887	14 October 1918
Tacchella Martino di Fiorentino	14 March 1879	17 October 1918
Robuschi Mario di Adamo	22 February 1893	21 October 1918
Boffardi Oreste di Dionigi (Ernesto)	20 April 1887	21 October 1918
Gonella Carlo di Amedeo	21 January 1889	25 October 1918
Omodeo Zorini Domenico (Omodeo Zorini Giuseppe)	29 October 1885	27 October 1918
Enrico Pietro di Pietro (Enrico Pietro)	11 September 1889	28 October 1918
Copelli Vincenzo di Giuseppe (Capelli Vincenzo)	8 August 1891	29 October 1918
Iannilli Ugo di Luigi (Iancilli Ugo)	25 March 1899	6 November 1918
Giordani Francesco di Mariano (Giordano Francesco)	4 September 1896	14 November 1918
Monguzzi Silvestro di Giovanni (Manguzzi Silvestro)	18 October 1884	14 November 1918
Rossi Giovanni di Pietro	17 April 1891	21 November 1918
Gismondi Antonio di Cesidio	3 January 1888	22 November 1918
Buzzoni Arnaldo di Giorgio (Bussone Armando)	4 December 1891	25 November 1918
Costanzi Giocondo di Giuseppe	29 April 1897	27 November 1918
Pistillo Vito di Giuseppe	17 January 1893	28 November 1918
Saltamerenda Sogno di Eugenio	14 July 1898	1 December 1918
Giannettoni Angelo di Luigi (Gianotti Angelo)	5 April 1895	15 December 1918
Théodule Giovanni di Antonio (Teodulo Giovanni)	7 September 1891	19 December 1918
Catenazzi Giulio di Pietro	19 July 1887	26 December 1918
Mereta Pietro di Lorenzo (Moretta Pietro)	19 January 1893	25 December 1918
Miliè Luigi di Luigi e Maria Iacometta	1 October 1885	29 December 1918
Larotonda Giuseppe di Filippo	8 May 1880	14 February 1918
Morabito Franco di Vincenzo (Marabito Francesco)	5 April 1899	15 January 1918
Pizzochero Luigi di Carlo (Pizzoccaro Luigi)	11 November 1887	18 January 1918
Pozzolo Valente di Giovanni Battista	26 June 1897	20 January 1918
Palermo Salvatore di Antonio	21 December 1893	9 January 1919
Nigro Rosario di Giacinto	5 December 1891	13 January 1919
Orefici Giovanni di Vincenzo	6 November 1887	15 January 1919
Piveri Luigi	1888	18 January 1919
Scalambrini Domenico	1900	26 January 1919
Sainaghi Cherubino di Enrico	21 July 1892	11 February 1919
Favagrossa Riccardo di Baldassarre (Faragiona Riccardo)	1 September 1886	24 February 1919
Scurati Angelo	unknown	unknown (buried 15 June 1923)

=== Family graves ===
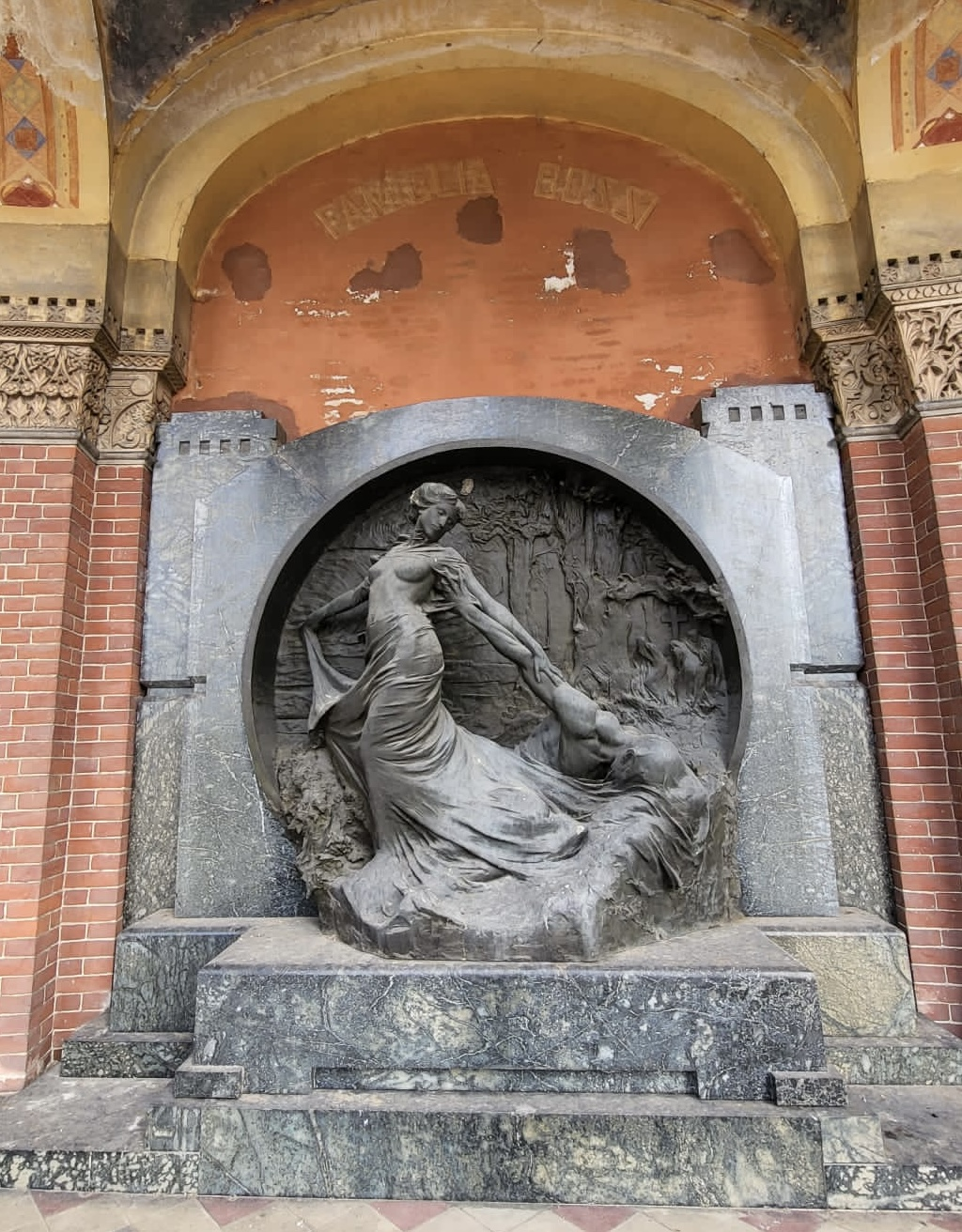
Bossi family's chapel in the Monumental Cemetery of Mortara, Italy

The Monumental Cemetery of Mortara contains numerous family graves. These include:

Family	Type of grave	Artist	Characteristics
Bianchi	chapel	Ferdinando Bialetti	Contains a fresco representing an angelic figure in front of a cross
Molina	chapel	Felice Bialetti (portraitist)	Contains two bronze busts
Carpani-Bianchi	chapel	Alceste Cortellona	Contains two medallions with the portraits of the family members
Scavia	chapel	(The artist's autograph is not decipherable)	Contains a base relief in white marble representing a woman kneeling in prayer
Bossi	chapel	Felice Bialetti	Contains a bronze sculpture representing the allegory of the soul that rises to heaven
Bozzani-Fornara	chapel	//	On a tombstone there is a funeral epigraphy for children
Goia	crypt	Silvio Santagostino	Contains a round with a portrait
Previdere-Pezza	crypt	Filippo Omegna	Has a white marble floor, a marble ceiling and contains a bronze sculptor of St. Francis
Tessera	chapel	Gaudenzion Rossi	Contains six medaillons with portraits arranged around a marble cross
Nai	chapel	Felice Bialetti	Contains a sculptural group
Morelli-Carboni	chapel	Felice Bialetti	Contains a fresco representing a kneeling woman

=== Missionary nuns' graves ===
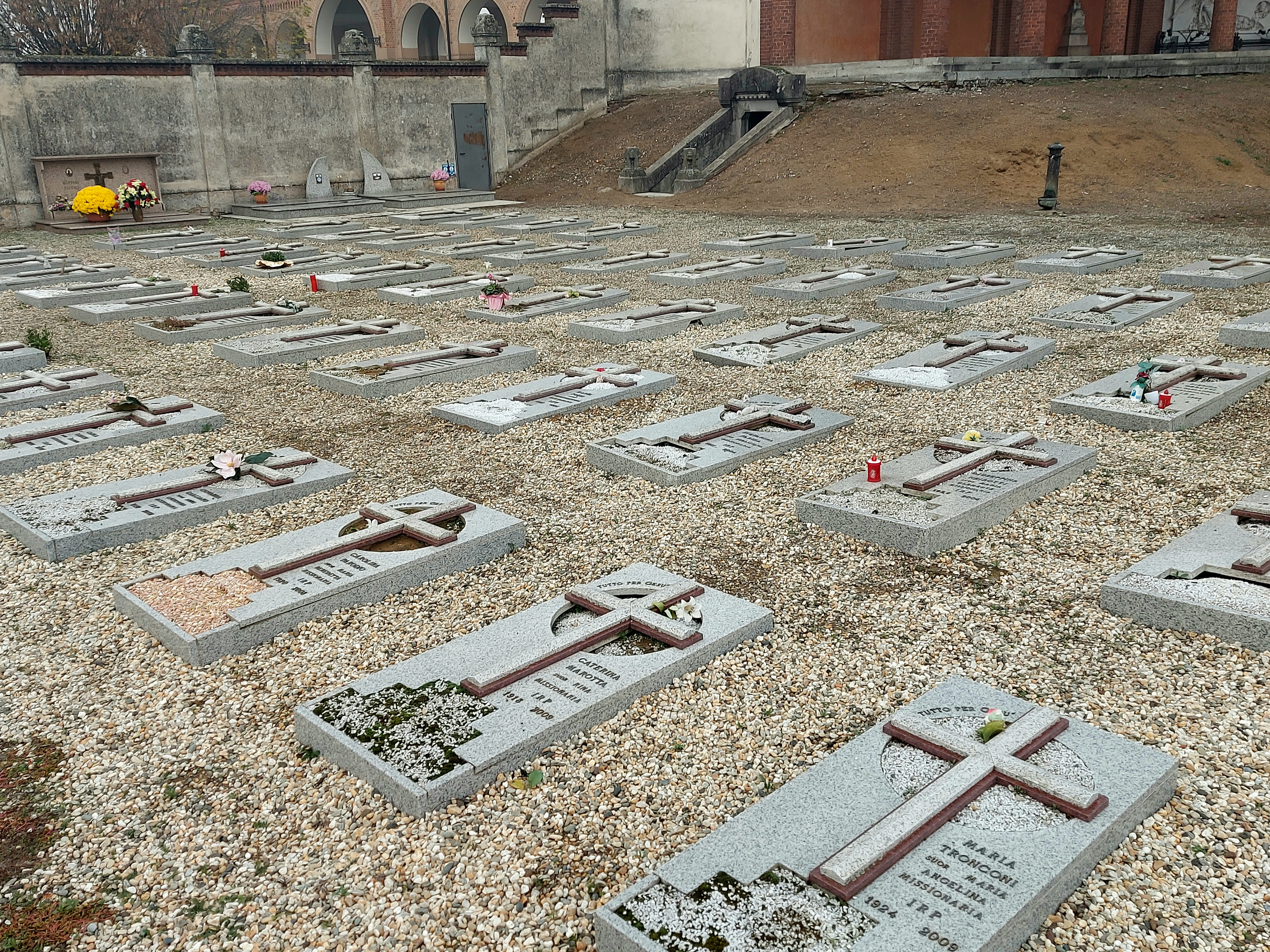
Graves of missionary nuns (Monumental Cemetery of Mortara, Italy)

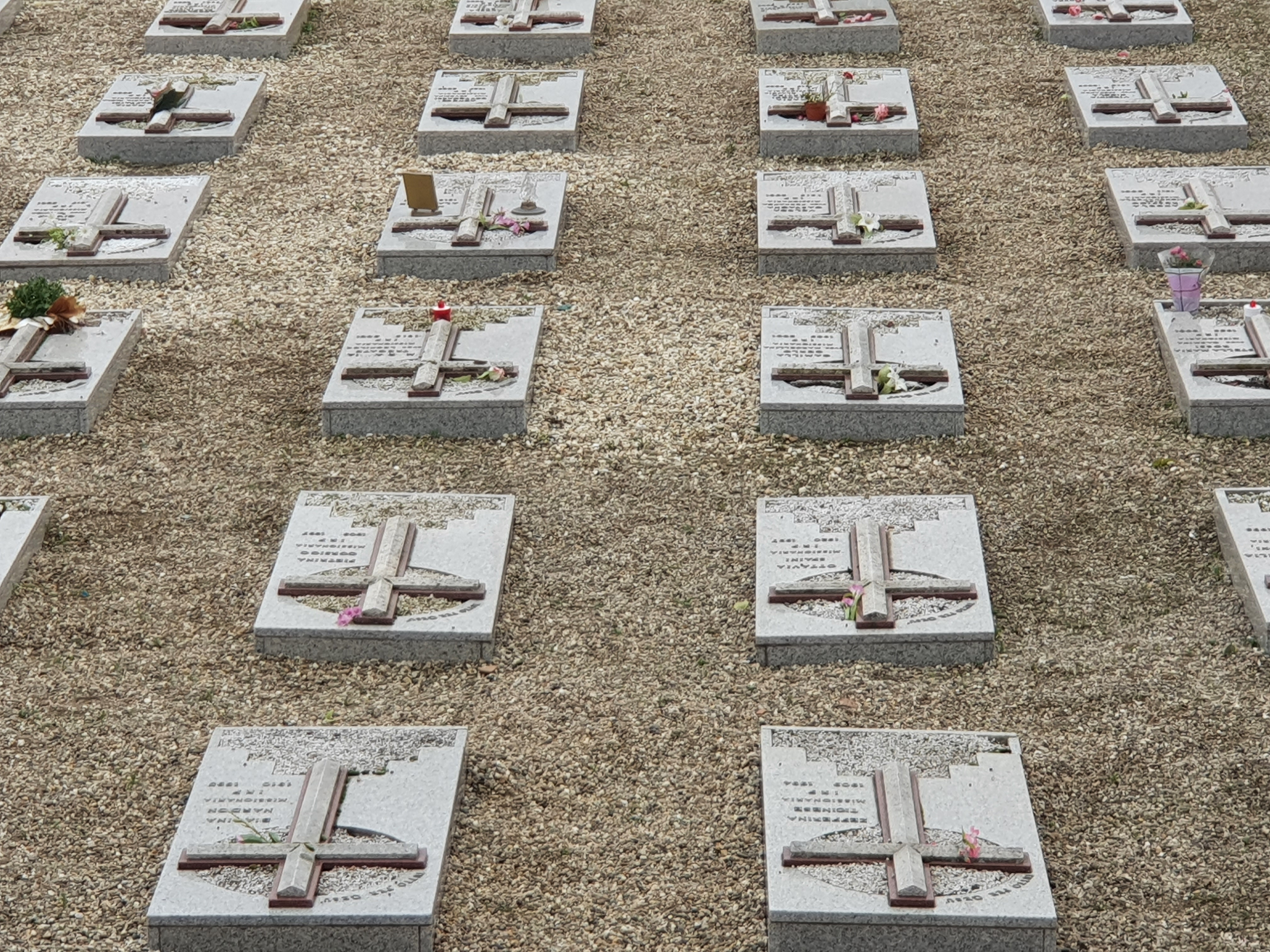
Graves of missionary nuns (Monumental Cemetery of Mortara, Italy)

A part of the Cemetery is dedicated to the missionary nuns born in Mortara, particularly to the missionary nuns of the Institute of Missionary Sisters of the Immaculate Regina Pacis. This area is located on the western part of the main segment of the Cemetery. The Institute submitted an application in 1989 to grant to the religious order a single field reserved for the urban Cemetery for the burials of its members. These graves are all of the same modest style. They are made of black and white granite, and on each tombstone is represented a cross.

==== Missionary nuns in Mortara ====
Mortara is the location of the Institute of Missionary Sisters of the Immaculate Regina Pacis. This congregation was founded in 1919 by Father Francesco Pianzola, an oblate priest from the Diocese of Vigevano. The mission of the Institute focuses particular attention on young people and women.

=== Remembrance area for people who died of Covid-19 ===
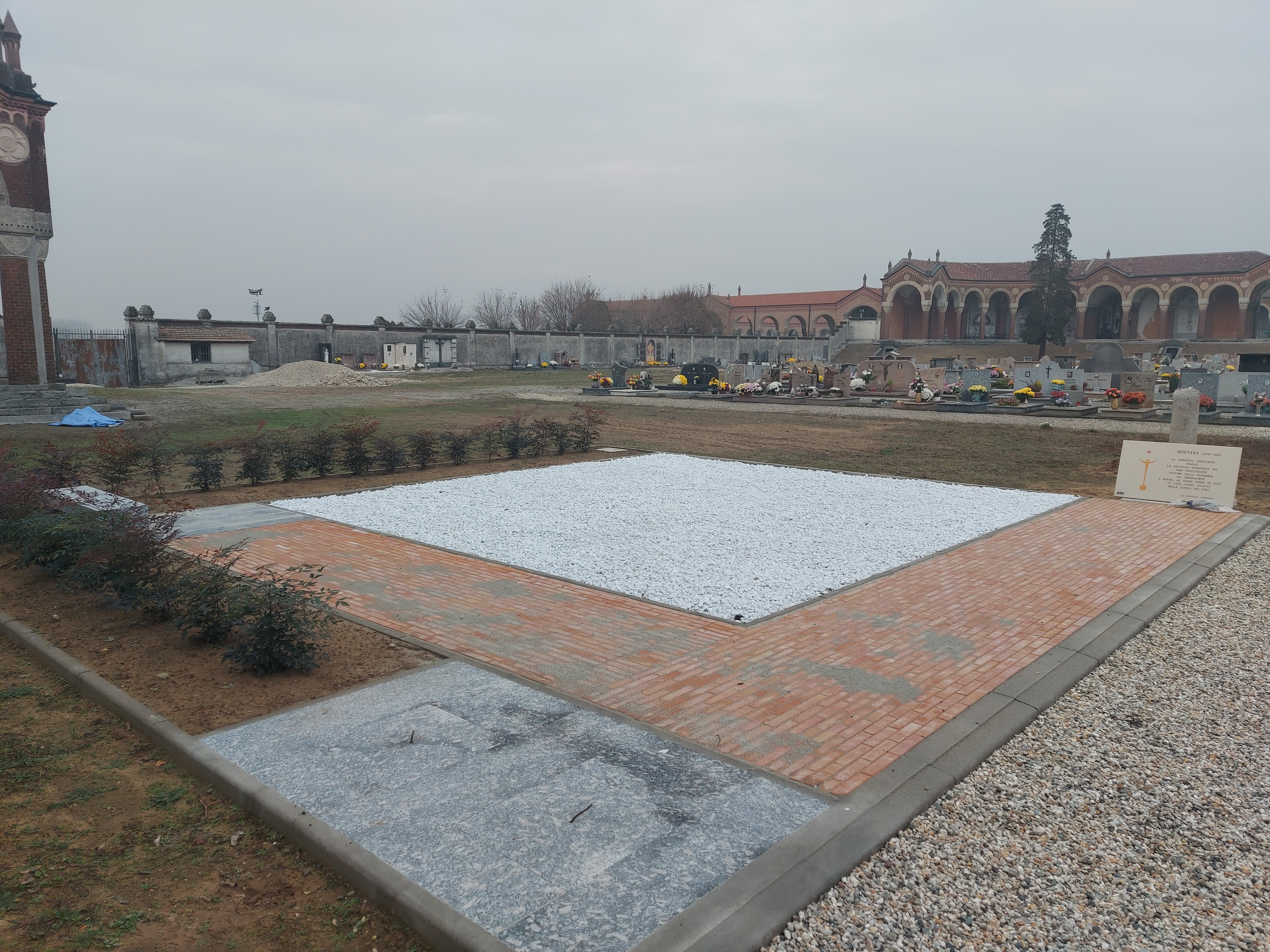
COVID-19 remembrance area (Monumental Cemetery of Mortara, Italy)

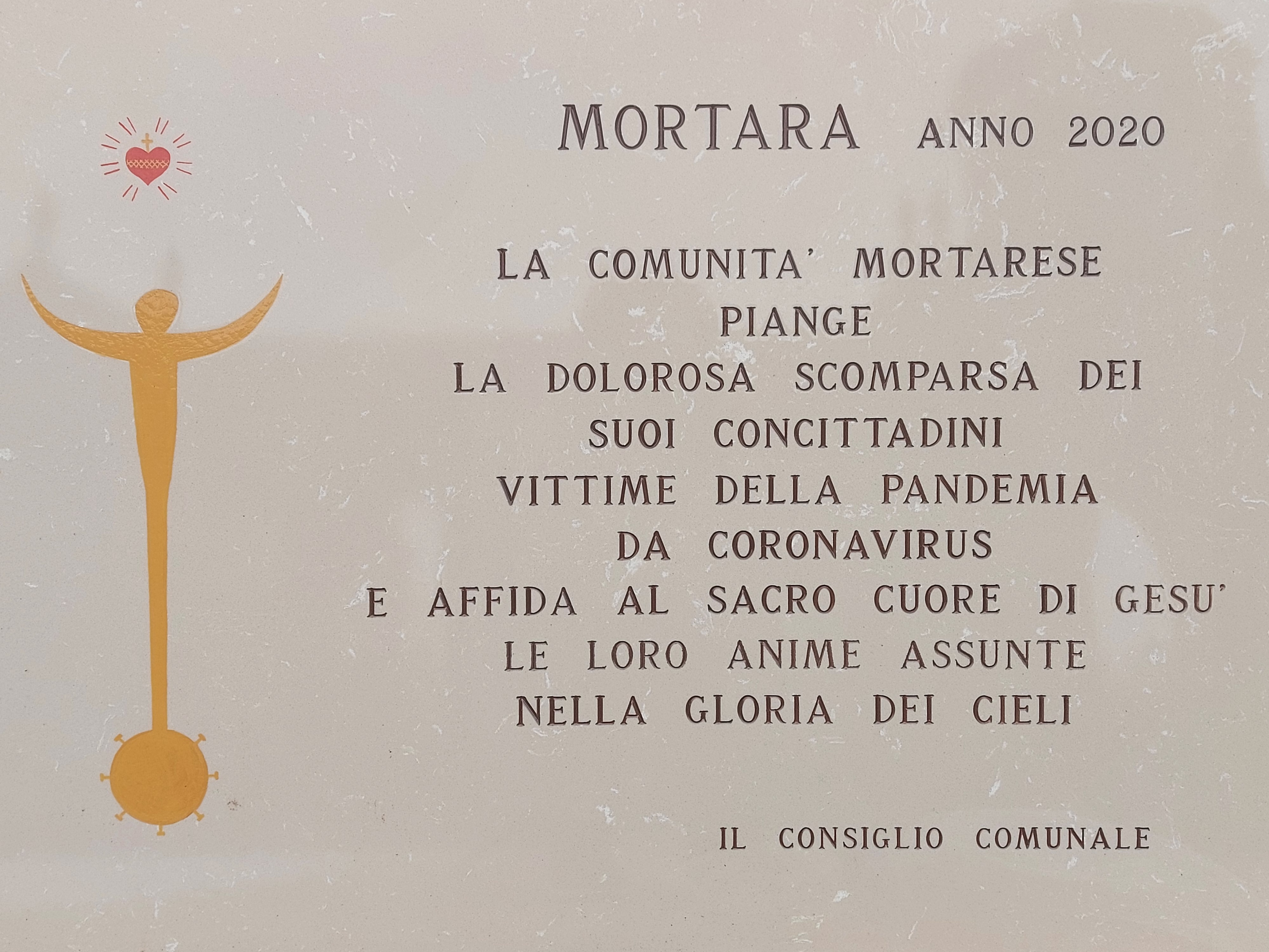
COVID-19 remembrance area tombstone (Monumental Cemetery of Mortara, Italy)

The COVID-19 pandemic has resulted in the death of many people around the world, including Italy and the city of Mortara. The Cemetery and the town council have dedicated a special section immediately after the entrance on the left side of the main pathway in remembrance of all the people that have died from the virus. The main part is a square area filled with small white stones which are surrounded by a terracotta-brick pathway, on which a stone bench has been positioned, and by some bushes on the left side. A tombstone has been placed on the right side with the Italian text "La comunità mortarese piange la dolorosa scomparsa dei suoi concittadini vittime della pandemia da coronavirus e affida al sacro cuore di Gesù le loro anime assunte nella gloria dei cieli", which means "The Mortarese community mourns the painful disappearance of its fellow citizens victims of the coronavirus pandemic and entrusts their souls to the sacred heart of Jesus into the glory of heaven".

== Thefts ==
The Cemetery has been subject to several break-ins where thieves have in most cases stolen copper cornices and bronze sculptures (respectively a precious metal and an alloy). Many thefts took place during the months of May and June 2021 and surveillance cameras and alarm systems have been installed as security measures, in order to prevent this from happening again.

== Gallery ==
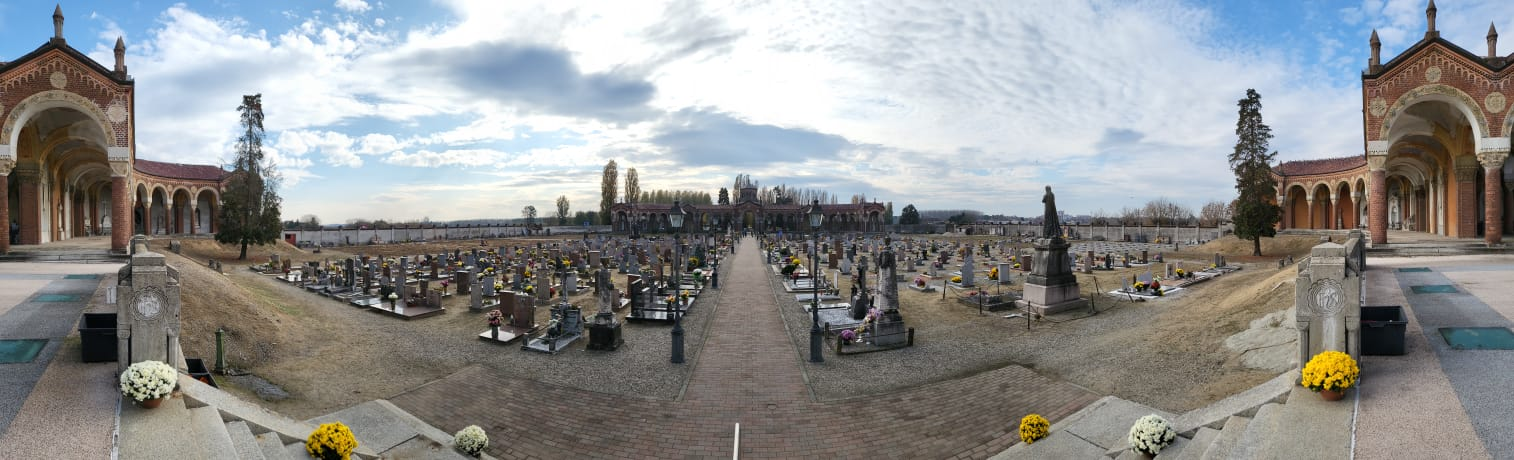
Panoramic view of the Monumental Cemetery of Mortara (from north to south)

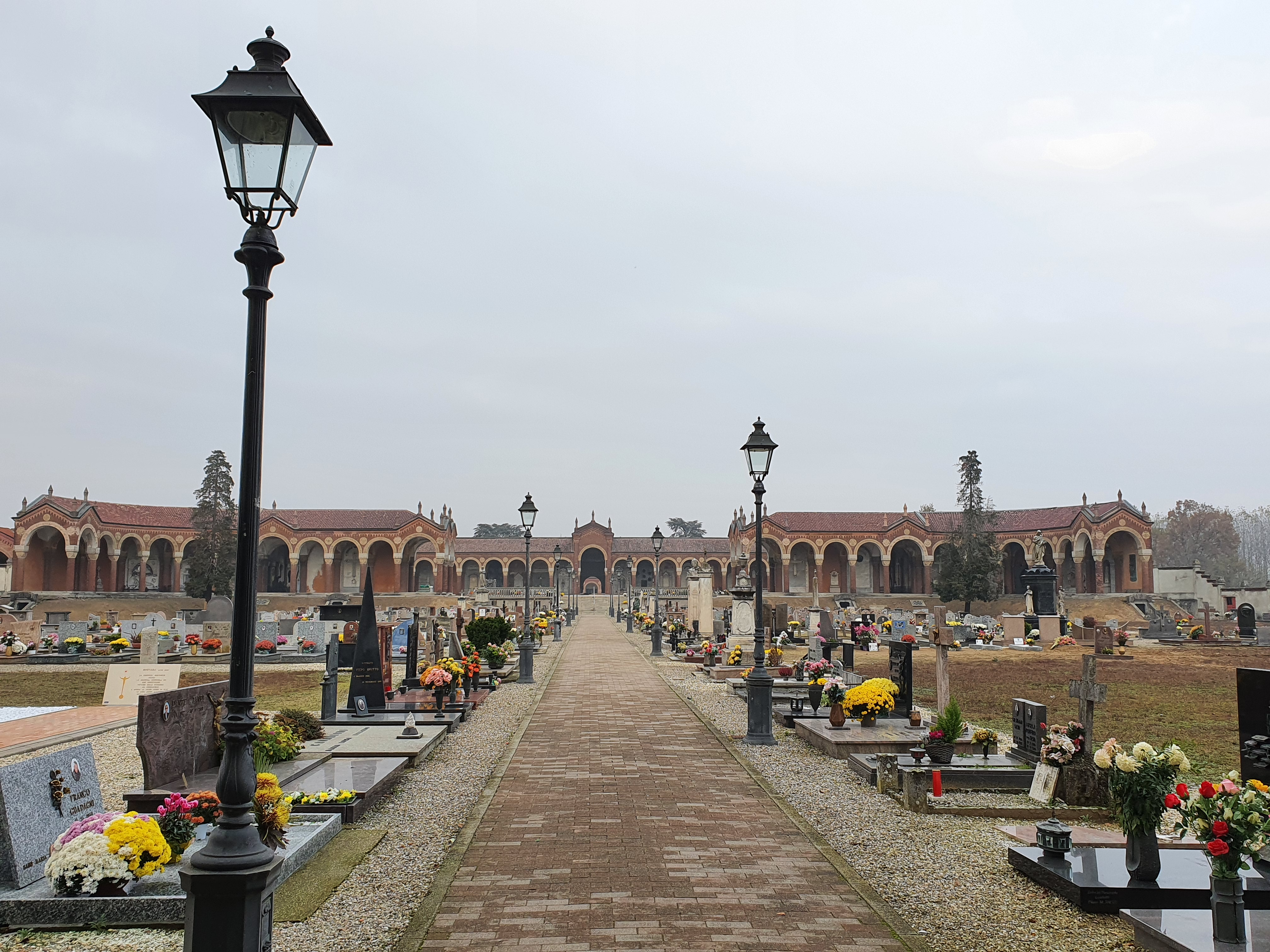
Panoramic view of the old section standing on the main pathway immediately after the entrance (from south to north)

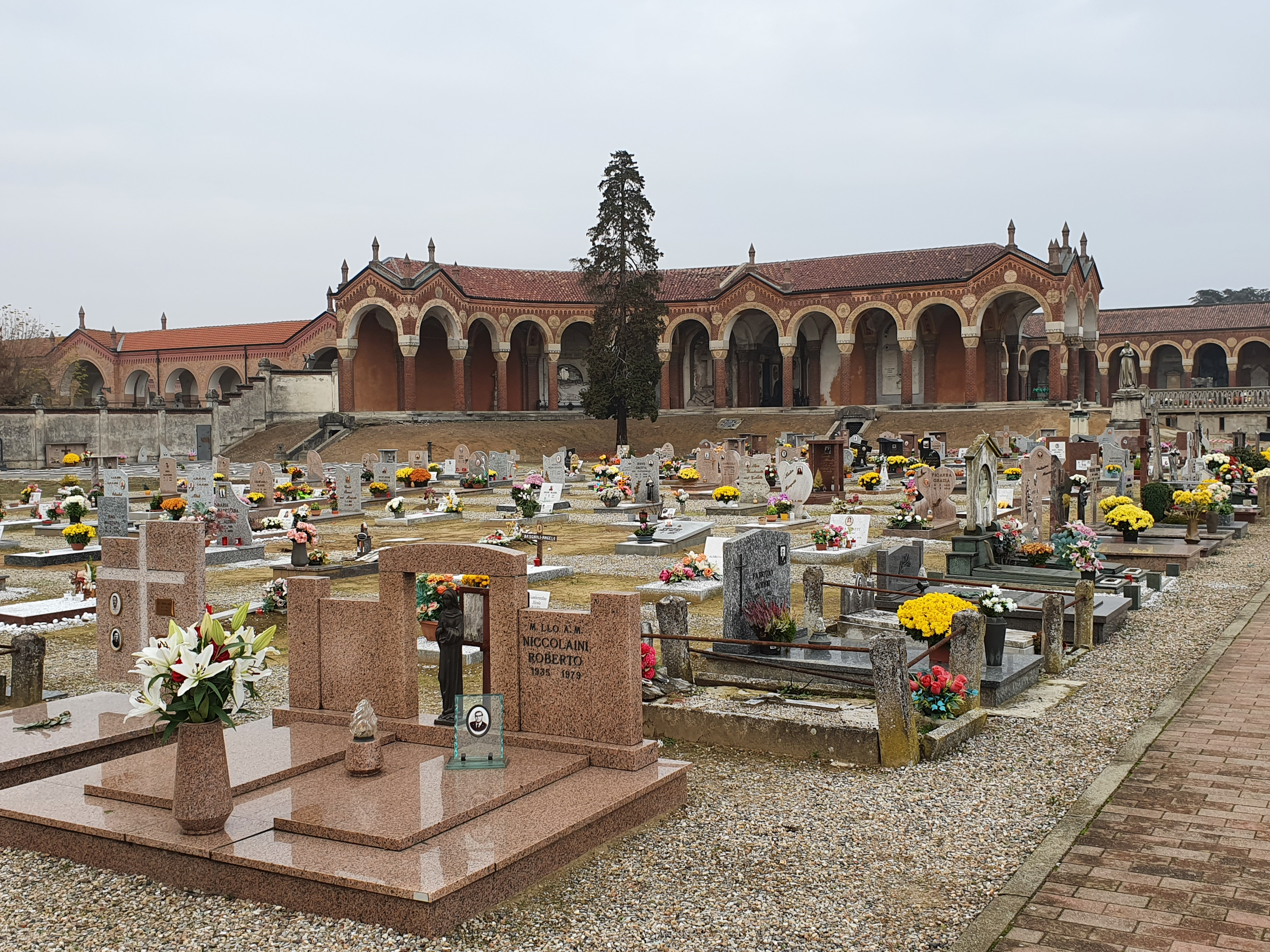
Left side panoramic view of the old section standing on the main pathway immediately after the entrance (from south-west to north-east)

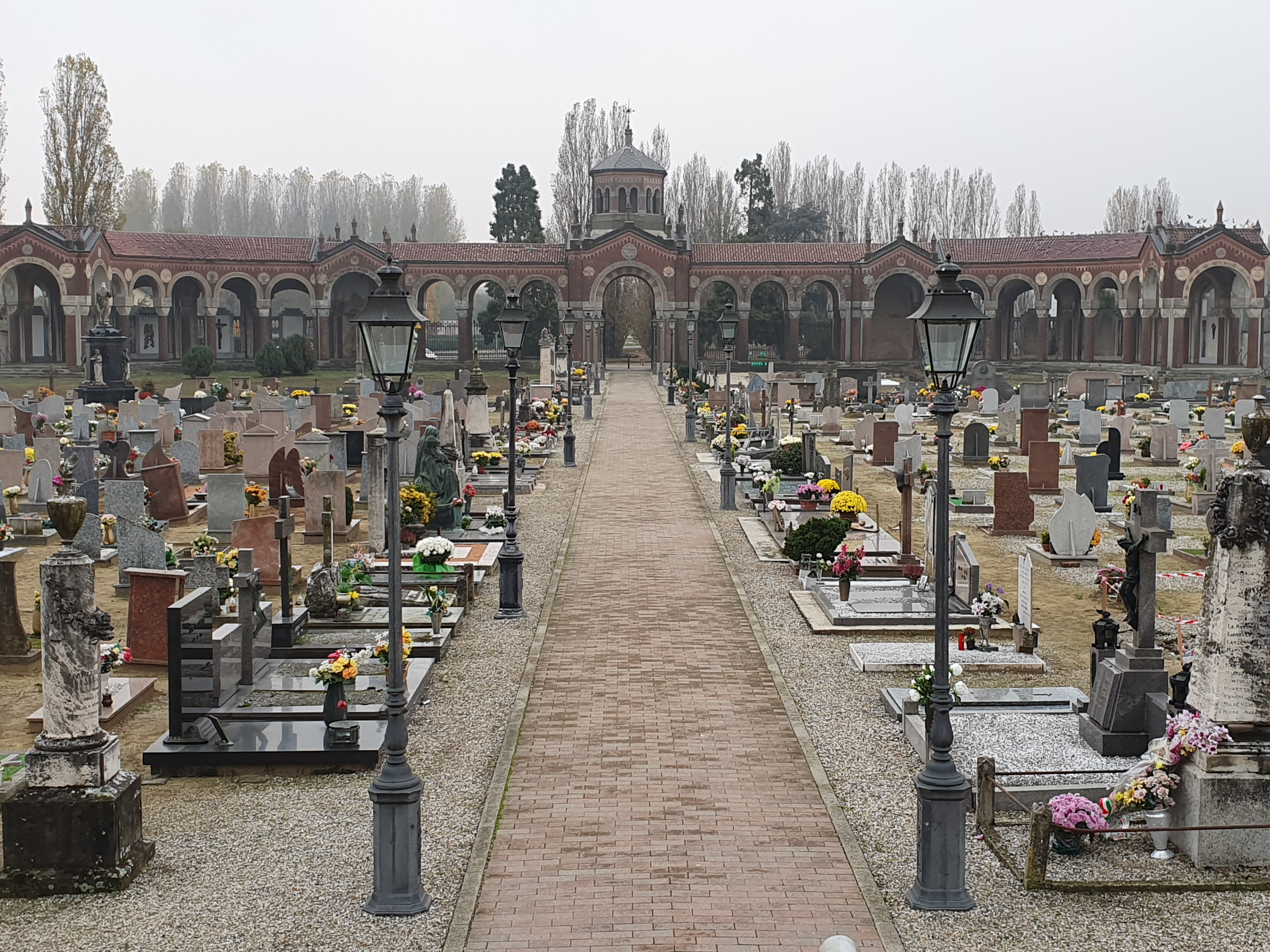
Panoramic view of the old section standing on the main pathway looking towards the main entrance (from north to south)

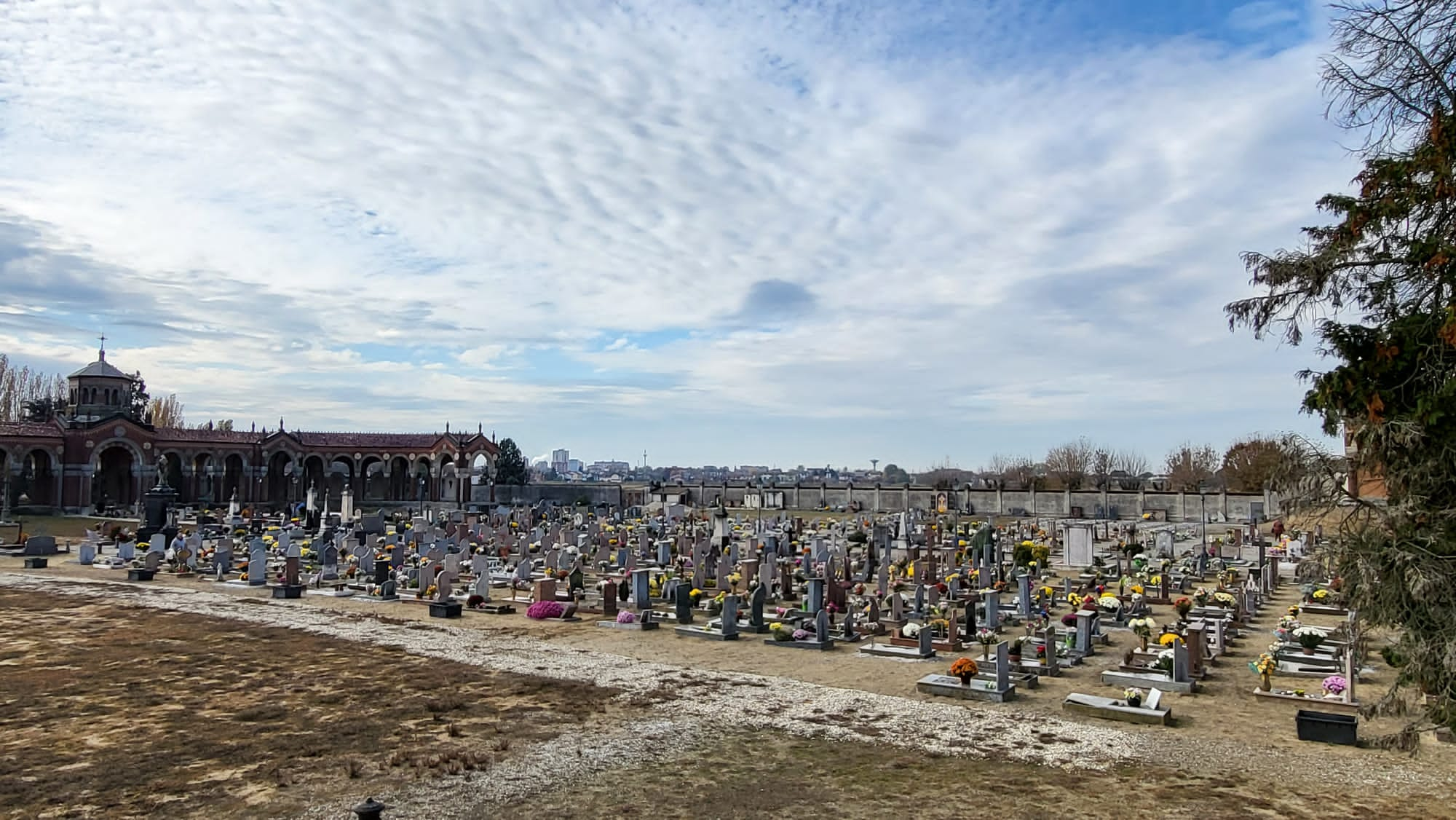
Panoramic view of the old section of the Monumental Cemetery of Mortara standing at the edge of the right central porches and the city of Mortara on the horizon (from north-east to south-west)

== See also ==
- Monumental Cemetery of Bonaria, Cagliari (Sardinia)
- Monumental cemetery of Brescia, Brescia (Lombardy)
- Monumental Cemetery of Campo Verano, Rome (Lazio)
- Monumental Cemetery of Milan, Milan (Lombardy)
- Monumental Cemetery of Staglieno, Genoa (Liguria)
- Certosa di Bologna, the site of the city's Monumental Cemetery
- Association of Significant Cemeteries in Europe
- War memorial
- List of cemeteries
