= Mortara, Lombardy =

Mortara Murtära (Lombard)
- Comune
- Città di Mortara
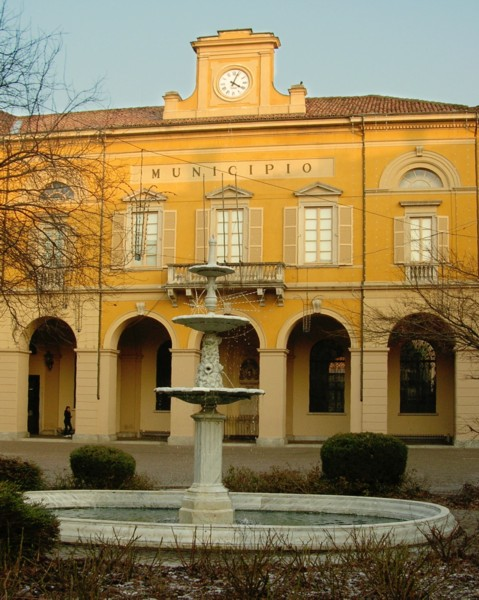
- Piazza dei Martiri della Libertà

- Location within Italy Location within Lombardy
- Coordinates: 45°15′N 8°45′E
- Country: Italy
- Region: Lombardy
- Province: Pavia (PV)
- Frazioni: Casoni di Sant'Albino, Casoni dei Peri, Cattanea, Guallina, Madonna Del Campo, Medaglia, Molino Faenza

Government
  - Mayor: Roberto Robecchi (since May 29, 2007)

Area
  - Total: 52 km^{2} (20 sq mi)
- Elevation: 108 m (354 ft)

Population (December 31, 2007)
  - Total: 15,325
  - Density: 290/km^{2} (760/sq mi)
- Demonym: Mortaresi
- Time zone: UTC+1 (CET)
  - Summer (DST): UTC+2 (CEST)
- Postal code: 27036
- Dialing code: 0384
- Patron saint: San Lorenzo Martire, Santa Veneranda
- Saint day: August 10
- Website: Official website

Mortara (Lombard: Murtära) is a comune (municipality) in the province of Pavia, in the Italian region of Lombardy. It lies between the Agogna and Terdoppio rivers, in the historical district known as Lomellina, a rice-growing agricultural center. It received the honorary title of city with a royal decree in 1706.

== History ==
The town has Roman origins and its first name was Pulchra Silva. After Charlemagne defeated the Longobard King Desiderius in 773, its name was changed to its modern name. In the Orlando Furioso (second canto) it can be read:

Quivi cader de’ Longobardi tanti,
e tanta fu quivi la strage loro,
che ‘l loco de la pugna gli abitanti
Mortara dapoi sempre nominoro.

Ludovico Ariosto, I cinque canti - canto II, 88

Translating as: "Here so many Longobards died and the slaughter of them was so great here that, from then on, the inhabitants gave the place of the battle the name of Mortara".

Around the 14th century the town was the site of leisure hunting, and an inhabitant Gian Galeazzo Visconti made an unsuccessful attempt to change its name into Beldiporto in 1384. The town became a fortress called "The Star" under Charles V and was besieged by the French-Piedmontese Army led by Francesco d'Este in 1658. It was restituted to Spain and remained a Spanish possession until 1706, when it was annexed to the Savoy Kingdom. In the same year it became the capital of the Province of Lomellina. On March 21, 1849 it was the site of the Battle of Mortara.

Mortara is now an agricultural center and large producer of rice. Goose sausage is regarded as a local specialty.

== Churches ==
=== San Lorenzo ===
San Lorenzo is a Gothic basilica with brick façade, was built (1375-1380) by Bartolino da Novara and renovated in 1840 and 1916. Two 15th-century tondos are found outside the main entrance. The pilaster strips depict SS. Albin, Amìcus and Amelius; these are 19th-century copies of a 15th-century polyptych by Paolo da Brescia, previously found in the Church of St Albin and now conserved in Sabauda Gallery. Inside the church, to the right of the entrance, in the first span is a 15th-century fresco depicting the Virgin with Her Child; in the 2nd span Virgin between Saints Roch and Sebastian (1524) attributed to Gaudenzio Ferrari. In the first chapel is housed a panel by Bernardo Lanino, dated 1578 and representing The Lady of the Rosary crowned by 15 tablets by the same author illustrating the fifteen mysteries of the Rosary. The niche is completed by four canvasses by G. C. Procaccini representing the Archangel and Our Lady of the Annunciation, The Escape from Egypt and The rest of the Holy Family, in addition to a Glory in Paradise attributed to Camillo Procaccini. In the second chapel, above the altar, is a Crucifixion with Ss. Ambrogius, Laurentius and Mary the Magdalen (1610) by Giovanni Battista Crespi (il Cerano). In the left aisle of the first chapel is a wooden Christmas crib with about 80 low relieved figures (beginnings of the fifteenth century) by Lorenzo da Mortara. A St Charles in prayer and Ste Anne with Virgin attributed to Morazzone. Second chapel - There is the fifteenth-century polyptych on a six-parted table, a work by A. De Munini.

=== Santa Croce ===
Santa Croce is a church founded in 1080, outside the walls under the patronage of Pope Gregorius VII; after town expanded, rebuilt by Tibaldi in 1596. Repairs in 1960s altered decoration. In the pilaster strip dividing 1st and 2nd chapels is an indentation in Carrara marble held said to be a footprint of the Christ retrieved from the Holy Land during the Crusades. The 3rd chapel on the right hosts a Adoration of the Magi (1533) by Bernardino Lanino. The 4th chapel houses a Saint Michael by Guglielmo Caccia (Il Moncalvo). In the counterfaçade there are two watercolours (1545) depict a Virgin of Annunciation and Archangel Gabriel, attributed to Vigevanese Bernardino Ferrari. The 4th chapel on the left houses a Virgin with Child and Saints by the 16th-century Venetian school and a 15th-century fresco representing Saint Augustin.

=== Sant'Albino ===
Sant'Albino, Mortara, one of the Christian mother churches of the 5th century Lomellina, re-used by Charlemagne as a burial ground for the numerous soldiers who fell in the battle between the Lombard and the Frank armies, on October 12, 773. Among the casualties there were also two paladins of Charlemagne's, Amelius of Alvernia and Amicus from Beyre, whose death inspired a lot of French chansons de geste. In 774 the famous abbot Alkwin Albin added a canonical college to the Church. During the Middle Ages Sant'Albino was a compulsory halting-piace for the pìlgrims going from Britain and France to Rome. The architectural style developed from an original mingling of the Romanesque style, clearly recognizable in the apse, with the Renaissance style, to be found in the façade and in the nave. Against the southern side of the portico of the façade, is a building, perhaps a part of the ancient monastery. Beside the church, there are the ruins of the cloister, a brick open gallery with wooden architraves and with a 14th-century Gothic window decorated with rural motives. In the interior, on the right wall, are three frescoes painted by Giovanni da Milano in 1410 and representing Abbot St Anthony, The Baptism of Jesus, Enthroned Virgin with Saints Albin, Jacob, St. Augustine and Donor. Another fresco, by an unknown painter working during the first half of the 15th century, can be seen under the triptych, representing St. Laurentius with the symbol of his martyrdom in his hand. Next to this fresco are located some visible marks carved in the bricks by the pilgrims to remember their passage: the most ancient readable date is the year 1100. Another anonymous fresco is on the left part of the presbytery and represents a Virgin with Child and Saints;

=== Santa Maria del Campo ===
Santa Maria del Campo, located about 2 km (1 mi) west of Mortara, near road to Novara. Founded in 1145, now has Lombard-Gothic layout of the hall churches, typical of Lomellina. Houses works attributed to Giovanni Battista Crespi (il Cerano). The main altar has a fresco depicting a Glory of Angels-Musicians, attributed to Cerano.

== Notable people ==
- Paolo Patrucchi, footballer
- Andrea Massucchi, gymnast
