= San Lorenzo, Mortara =

Basilica church in Mortara, Lombardy, Italy

Coordinates: 45.2519°N 8.7387°E

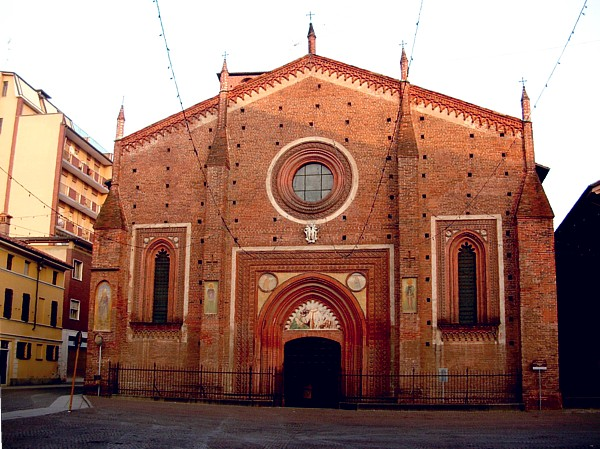
Church of San Lorenzo in Mortara

San Lorenzo is a Gothic architecture, Roman Catholic Basilica church in Mortara, Province of Pavia, region of Lombardy, Italy.

== History ==
The church was designed and built by Bartolino da Novara between 1375 and 1380. Restorations took place in 1840 and again in 1916.

The unfinished brick facade contains a central rose window and lateral ogival windows, flanked by buttresses that taper into roof spires. Two exterior 15th-century bas-reliefs are above the entry portal. In the pilaster strips are 19th-century copies of depictions of the Saints Albin, Amicus and Amelius found in a 15th-century polyptych by Paolo da Brescia, a work once in the local church St Albin and now conserved in the Sabauda Gallery of Turin.

Inside, in first span on the right there is an anonymous 15th-century fresco representing the Virgin and Child; in the second span, a Virgin between Saints Roch and Sebastian (1524) attributed to Gaudenzio Ferrari. The first chapel houses a panel depicting the Madonna of the Rosary (1578) by Bernardo Lanino; the same author painted a panel is crowned by tablets depicting the fifteen mysteries of the Rosary. The niche is completed by four canvases depicting the Archangel Gabriel and the Virgin of the Annunciation, Flight to Egypt, and Rest of the Holy Family by Giulio Cesare Procaccini, in addition to a canvas of Glory in Paradise attributed to Camillo Procaccini. In the second chapel, above the altar, is the large altarpiece depicting Crucifixion with Saints Ambrosius, Laurentius and Mary the Magdalen, (1610) by Giovanni Battista Crespi.

In the first chapel on the left is a 15th-century Christmas Nativity scene (presepi) made in wood with about 80 low relief figures by Lorenzo da Mortara. Next to this is a San Carlo in prayer and St Anne with Virgin attributed to Pier Francesco Mazzucchelli.

The second chapel has a fifteenth-century polyptych on a six-parted table, by A. De Mulini.
