= Santa Maria del Campo, Mortara =

Church in Lombardy, Italy

Coordinates: 45°15′58.5″N 8°42′57.9″E

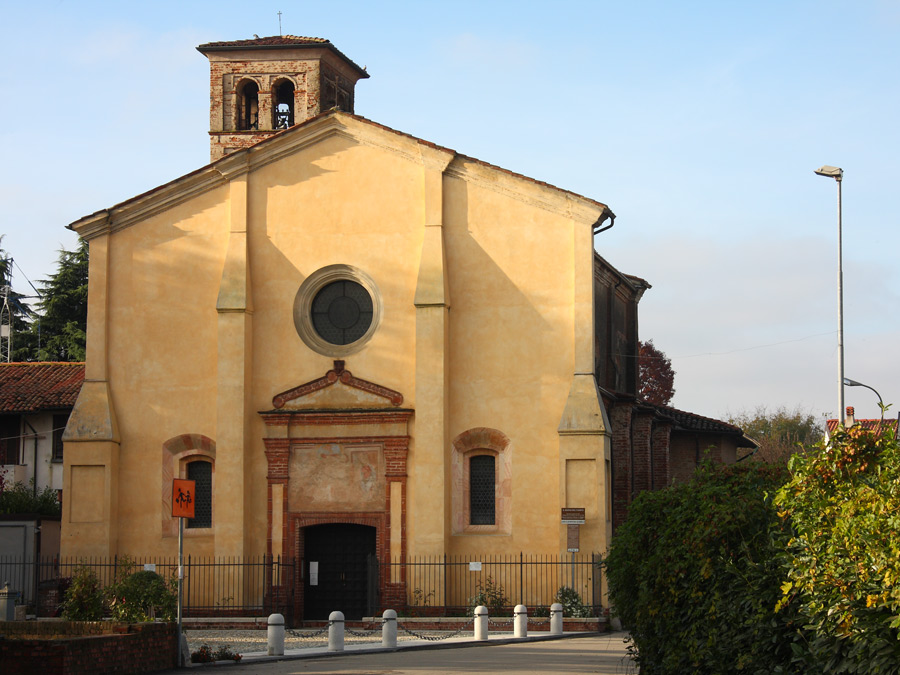
Church of Santa Maria del Campo by Mortara

Santa Maria del Campo is a Gothic architecture, Roman Catholic church located about 2 kilometers west of Mortara, Province of Pavia, region of Lombardy, Italy.

== History ==
This Church stands at the end of a little square of the cluster of buildings on the road to Novara. A church at the site has been documented since 1145: traces of it remain. The facade shows has a layout of Lombard Romanesque churches.

The frescoed internal niches serve as chapels. One 15th-century fresco depicts the Madonna of the Rosary with Saints Roch and Dominic. Many of the works are attributed to Giovanni Battista Crespi (il Cerano) or a follower, including a damaged Pietà, the main altar's Glory of Angels-Musicians, and two Chapel statues, representing Saints Dominic and John the Baptist, attributed to Cerano.
