= Abbey of Sant'Albino, Mortara =

Church-monastery complex in Mortara, Lombardy, Italy

Coordinates: 45.2460°N 8.7532°E

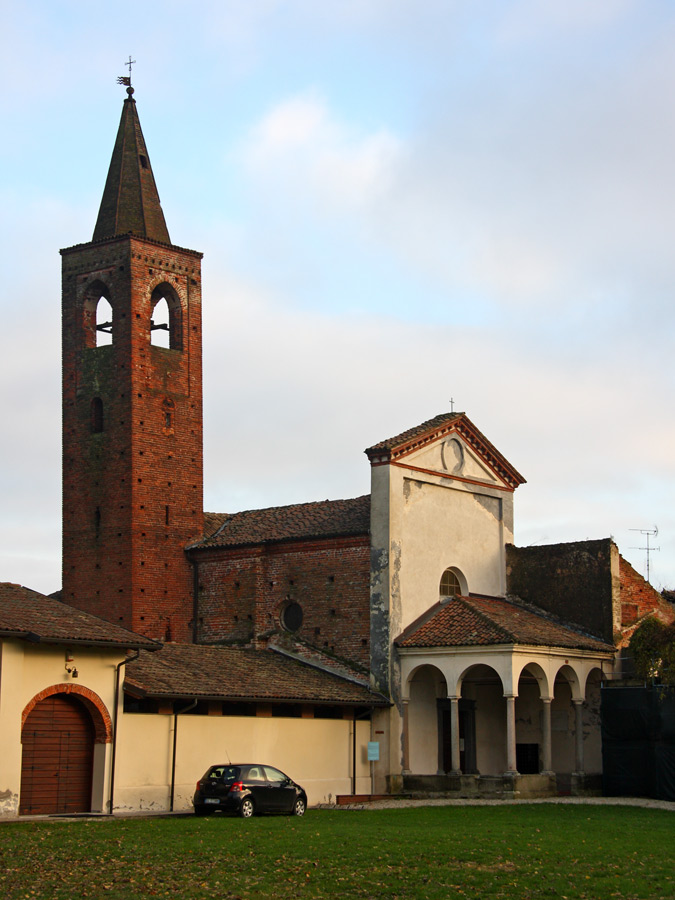
The Sant'Albino Abbey in Mortara

The Abbey of Sant'Albino is a church-monastery complex, founded in the 5th century in Mortara, Province of Pavia, region of Lombardy, Italy.

== History ==
In 774 the abbot Alkwin Albin added a canonical college to the church, which had become a stopping place for pilgrims traveling south to Rome. Initially, the church was called Sant'Eusebio, then Albino after its bishop Albino Secondo

The church of Sant'Eusebio had putatively been founded by Charlemagne to bury the soldiers of his army who died locally in a battle on October 12, 773. Among the casualties there were also two paladins of Charlemagne's, Amelius of Alvernia and Amicus from Beyre.

The church has been refurbished over the centuries, and the architecture is eclectic, mingling the original Romanesque style, clearly recognizable in the hemicircular apse, with the Renaissance style, to be found in the facade and in the nave.

Against the southern side of the portico of the facade, is a building, perhaps a part of the ancient monastery. Beside the church, there are the ruins of the cloister, a brick open gallery with wooden architraves and with a 14th-century Gothic window decorated with rural motives. In the interior, on the right wall, are three frescoes (1410) painted by Giovanni da Milano depicting St Anthony Abbott, the Baptism of Jesus, and an Enthroned Virgin with Donor and Saints Albin, Jacob, and Augustine. Another fresco, by an unknown 15th-century painter depicts St Laurentius with the symbol of his martyrdom in his hand. Next to this fresco are graffiti carved in the bricks by the pilgrims over the ages: the most ancient is from the year 1100. Another anonymous fresco is on the left part of the presbytery and represents Virgin with Child and Saints.
