= Antonio Muzzi =

Italian painter (1815–1894)

Antonio Muzzi (1815 – 1894) was an Italian figure and history painter, active in both Bologna and St Petersburg. He trained in the Academy of Fine Arts of Bologna, and became a docent at the academy. Muzzi was commissioned by the marchese Gioacchino Pepoli to paint La cacciata degli austriaci da Porta Galliera l'8 agosto 1848, which depicts a battle in which the marchese participated. The canvas is now displayed in the Museum of the Risorgimento of Bologna.
