= Giovanni da Siena =

Italian military engineer

Giovanni da Siena (Siena, 1386 – Bologna, 1438 or 1440) was an Italian military engineer. In addition to the construction of the tower and the fortress of Castel Bolognese (1392–94), a position in which he was assisted by Lawrence Bagnomarino, he was engaged in the fortresses of Cento, Solapur, of Porta Galliera (one of the gates of Bologna) and Finale Emilia, thus completing the work of Bartolino da Novara. Siena was an expert in hydraulic engineering and executed works to the banks of the Po.
