= San Martino, Vigevano =

Former church in Pavia province, Italy

Coordinates: 45°19′36.5″N 08°50′45.8″E

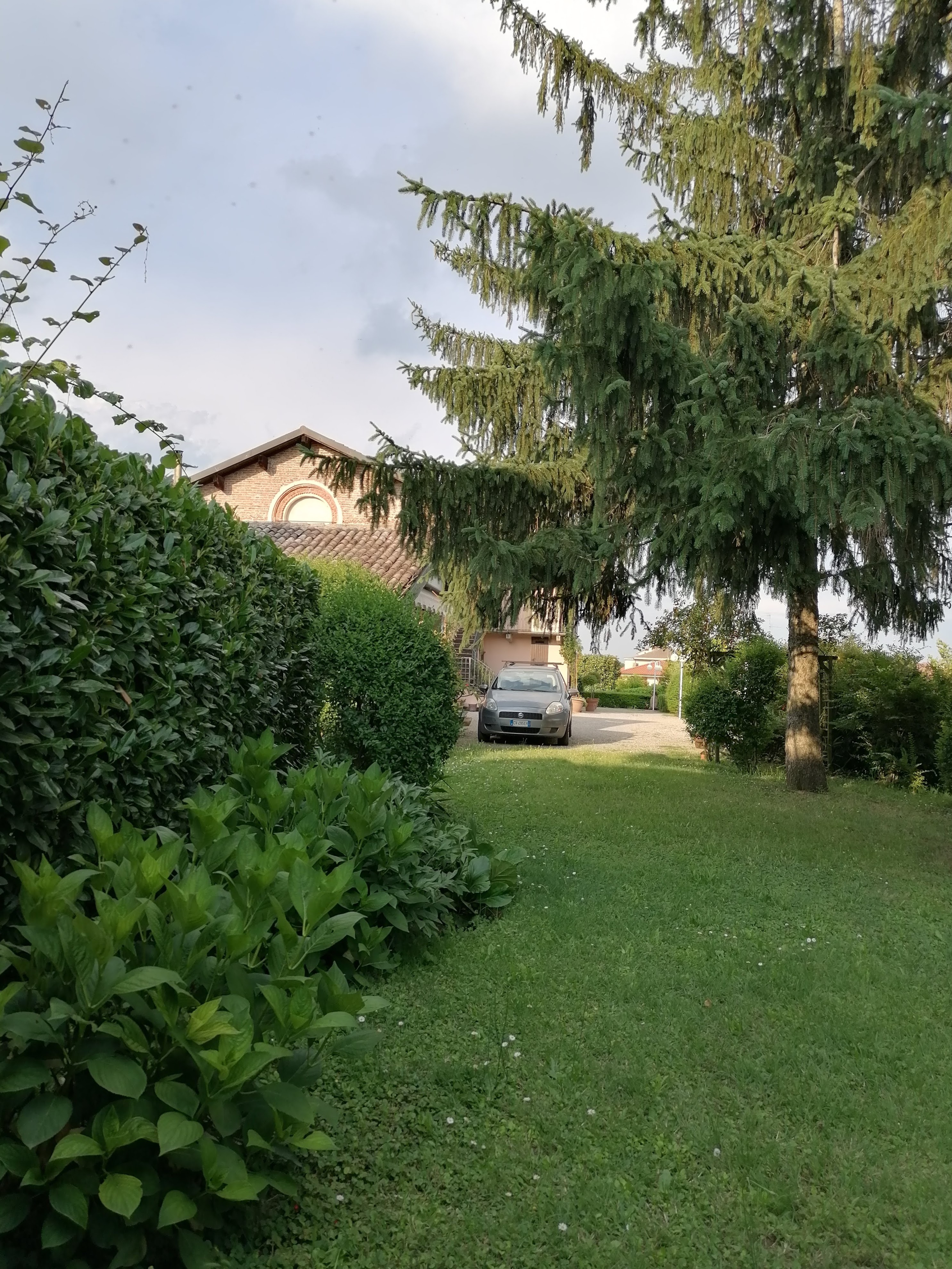
The church.

The church of San Martino is a religious building located in Vigevano.

== Description and history ==
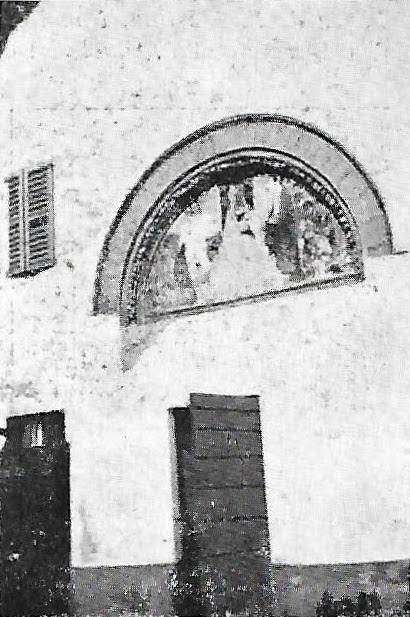
The ancient façade of the church, before the modifications.

Now deconsecrated, the church of San Martino is located in a closed courtyard with a gate, at the end of via Palestro. It was an ancient title of the collegiate parish church of Sant'Ambrogio.

According to some historians, it could be the matrix of all the churches of Vigevano, with the name of San Pietro. In the first official document in which Vigevano is mentioned (year 963) there is mention of an archpriest Grauso, "archpriest at the church of S. Pietro in Vico and custodian of a basilica in castro Vicogeboin dedicated to St. Ambrose...". According to Alessandro Colombo, the church was the basilica in which the bishops of a presumed diocese of Piccolini officiated, with the name of San Pietro in silva carbonaria; finally, a fresco on the left wall of the apse, still well preserved, depicting Saint Peter, would prove this dedication. But these are assumptions.

We certainly know what Simone dal Pozzo reports, who writes: "The Church of S. Martino is very ancient, which gave its name to the city gate under this name. During 1517 it was known as S. Michele". In 1517 the municipality vowed to restore it during a ferocious plague. It was then used as a cemetery. After the vote, and the plague having passed, "immediately with offerings the ancient building was thrown to the ground and it was reformed in the manner that can be seen".

It was consecrated in 1508 by the Bishop of Novara. The fresco on the portal of the façade dates back to that period, depicting the Madonna sitting with the Child between Saints Roch and Martin, and another Saint holding a basket of flowers. Other frescoes, quite well preserved, are found inside on the left wall of the nave; ornamental graffiti are also visible inside. The "sail" vault of the sacristy is also interesting.

It was visited by Saint Charles in 1578: then it was held by the Franciscans or the Capuchins. There is still news of restorations to the bell tower in the year 1669.

In 1810 it was suppressed and sold, being then under the patronage of the Sacristy of the Church of Sant'Ambrogio.
