= Santa Croce, Mortara =

Basilica church in Mortara, Lombardy, Italy

Coordinates: 45.2520°N 8.7352°E

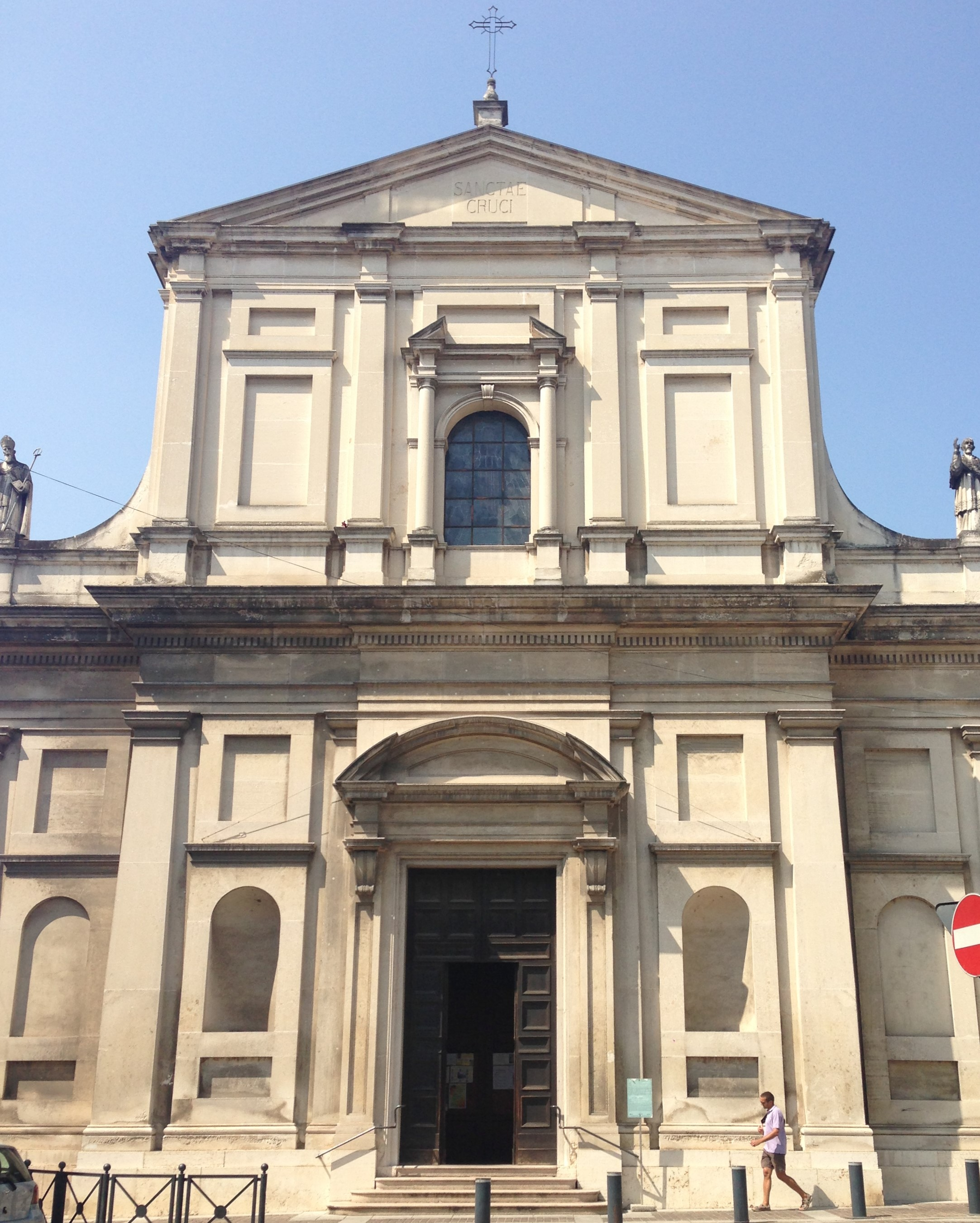
Mortara - chiesa di Santa Croce.jpg

Santa Croce is a Renaissance style, Roman Catholic Basilica church in Mortara, Province of Pavia, region of Lombardy, Italy.

The original church at the site was founded in 1080, outside the walls of the village under the patronage of Pope Gregory VII. With the expansion of the town, the church was rebuilt in 1596 using designs of Pellegrino Tibaldi. One of the holy relics of the church is putatively a foot print of Christ, though made of Carrara marble, and, according to the tradition, dating back to the period of the Crusades.

It is located between two of the chapels on a pilaster strip. In the third chapel on the right there is a canvas depicting the Adoration of Magi (1533) by Bernardino Lanino. In the fourth chapel, the altarpiece depicting St Michael defeating Satan by Guglielmo Caccia, also called Il Moncalvo.

In the counterfacade there are two tempera canvases (1545) depicting Our Lady of the Annunciation and Archangel Gabriel, attributed to the Vigevanese painter Bernardino Ferrari. The fourth chapel on the left exhibits a Virgin and Child and Saints by the 16th-century Venetian school and a 15th-century fresco representing St Augustine
