= Rocca Estense, San Felice sul Panaro =

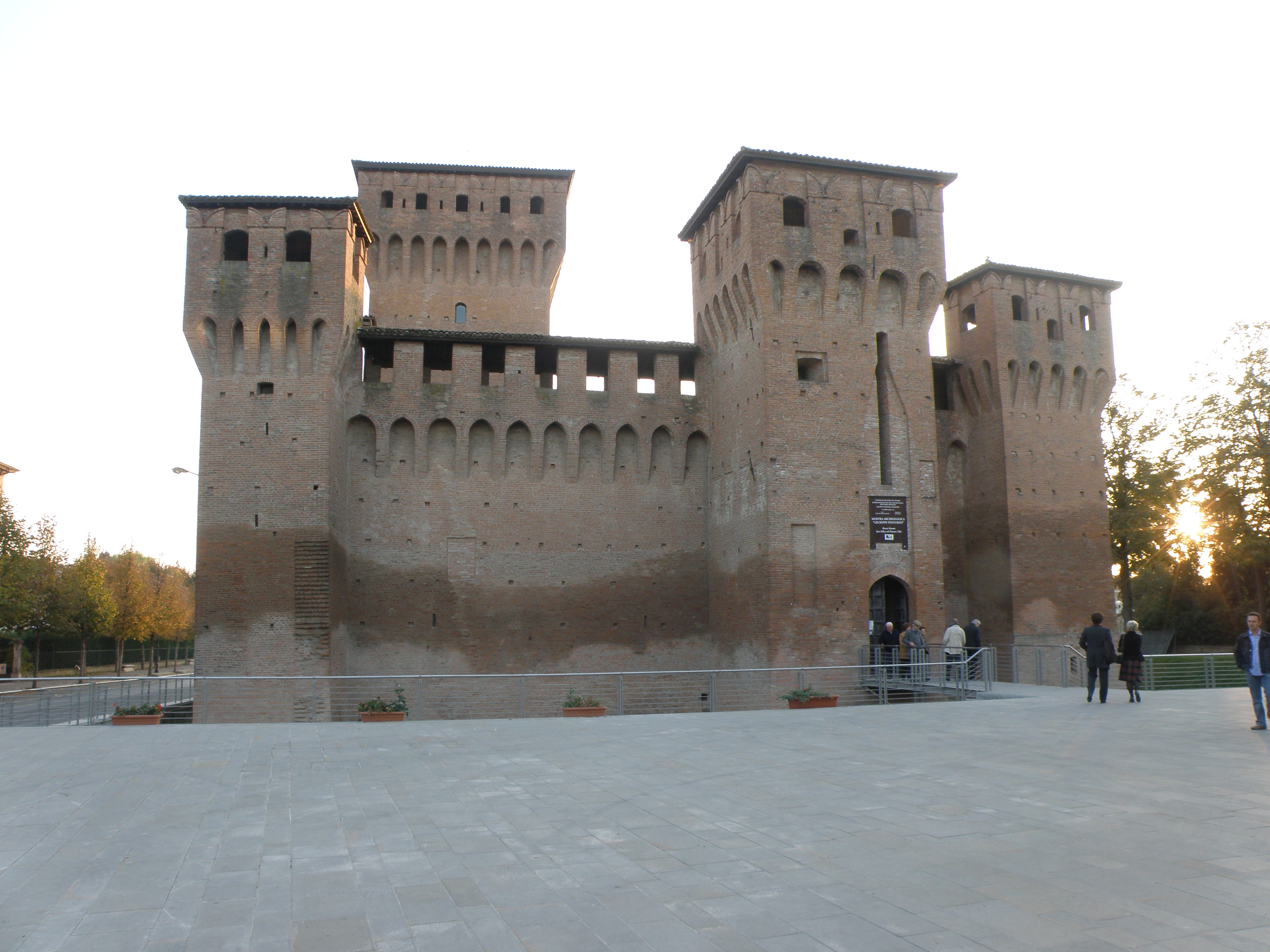
The castle before the 2012 earthquake.

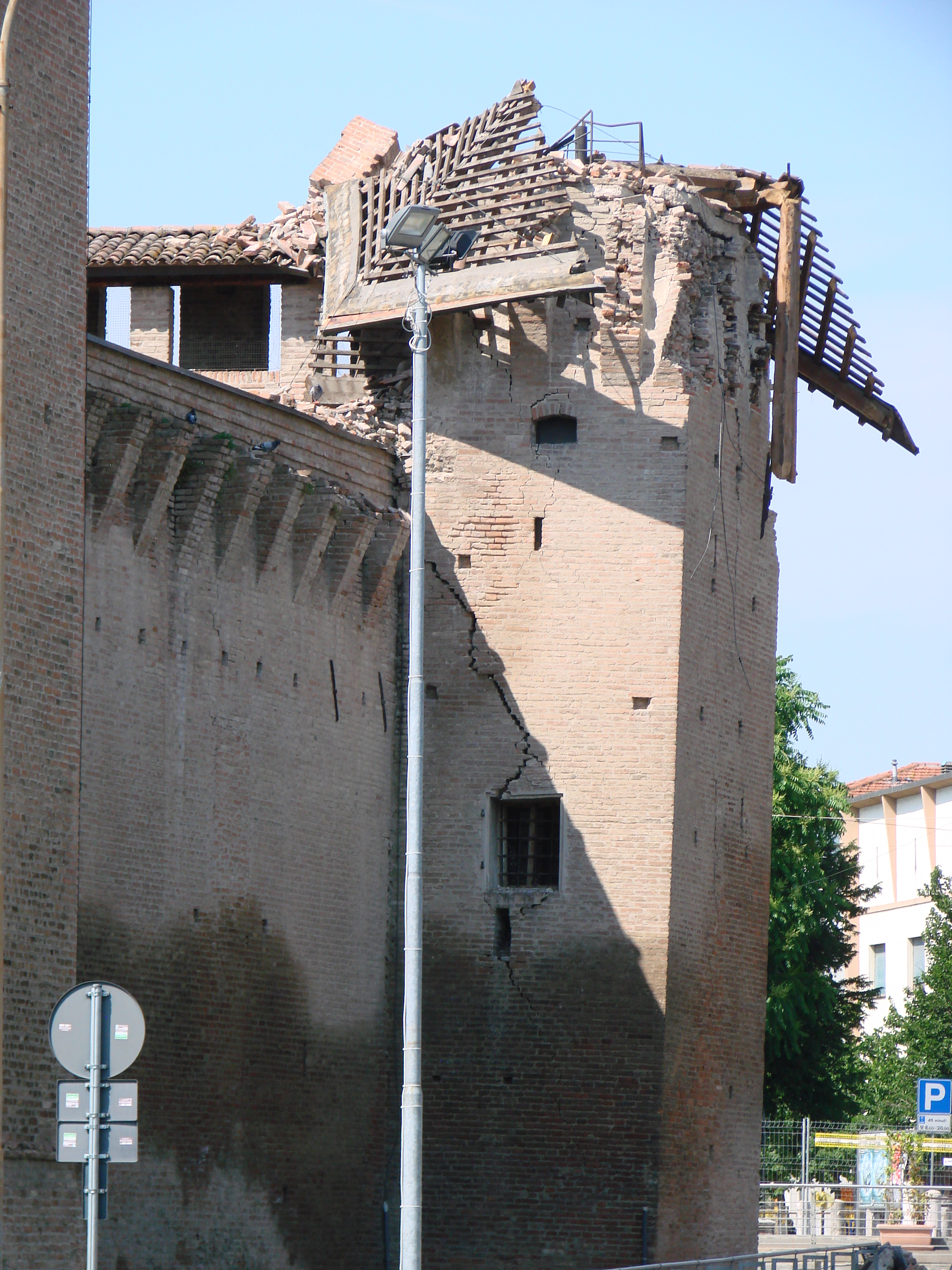
Earthquake damage, 2012.

The Rocca Estense is a castle in San Felice sul Panaro, a comune (municipality) in the Province of Modena in the Italian region Emilia-Romagna. It is located about 40 kilometres (25 mi) northwest of Bologna and about 25 kilometres (16 mi) northeast of Modena.

== History ==
Construction of the castle began in 1340 on the orders of the Marquis Obizzo III d'Este and took about twenty years to complete. In the following century, it was restored and further fortified by order of the Marquis Niccolò III d'Este, who commissioned the work from the military architect Bartolino da Novara.

The region was struck by two earthquakes in May 2012. The first earthquake, with a magnitude of 6.0, occurred on 20 May 2012 and severely damaged the castle.

In January 2018, the restoration project of the fortress was presented, with an estimated cost of 6.6 million euros.

== See also ==
- List of castles in Italy
