= Melchiorre Gherardini =

Italian painter (1607–1668)

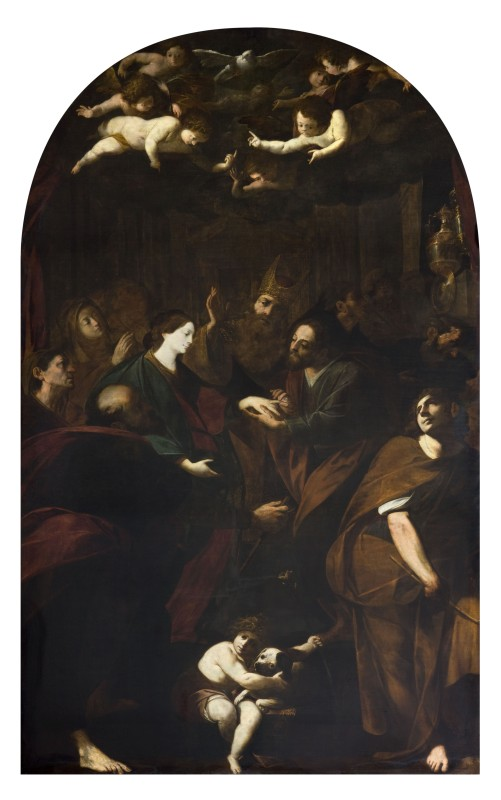
Sposalizio della Vergine (Fondazione Cariplo)

Melchiorre Gherardini (1607–1668), known as Ceranino, was an Italian painter.

== Biography ==
Born in Milan in 1607, Gherardini was closely linked in his artistic career to Giovan Battista Crespi, known as Cerano, his master and father-in-law. On Cerano's death, he inherited his workshop and house, where he is documented as resident with his wife from 1633 on. This was also the year when he adopted the byname Ceranino in order to celebrate the memory of the great figure of 17th-century painting and the Milanese Borromeo tradition. He died in Milan in 1668 after producing a vast amount of work of a primarily religious character based on the models of Cerano with a particular focus of the theatrical elements.

== Other projects ==
Media related to Melchiorre Gherardini at Wikimedia Commons
