= Paolo Patrucchi =

Italian footballer

Personal information
- Date of birth: September 22, 1908
- Place of birth: Mortara, Italy
- Position: Striker

Senior career*
Years	Team	Apps	(Gls)
1926–1931	Casale	93	(16)
1931–1932	Bari	12	(1)
1932–1934	Novara	2	(0)
1934–1935	Roma	2	(0)
- * Club domestic league appearances and goals

Paolo Patrucchi (born September 22, 1908 in Mortara) was an Italian professional football player.

He played for 3 seasons (46 games, 3 goals) in the Serie A for A.S. Casale Calcio, A.S. Bari and A.S. Roma.
