= Macrino d'Alba =

Italian painter

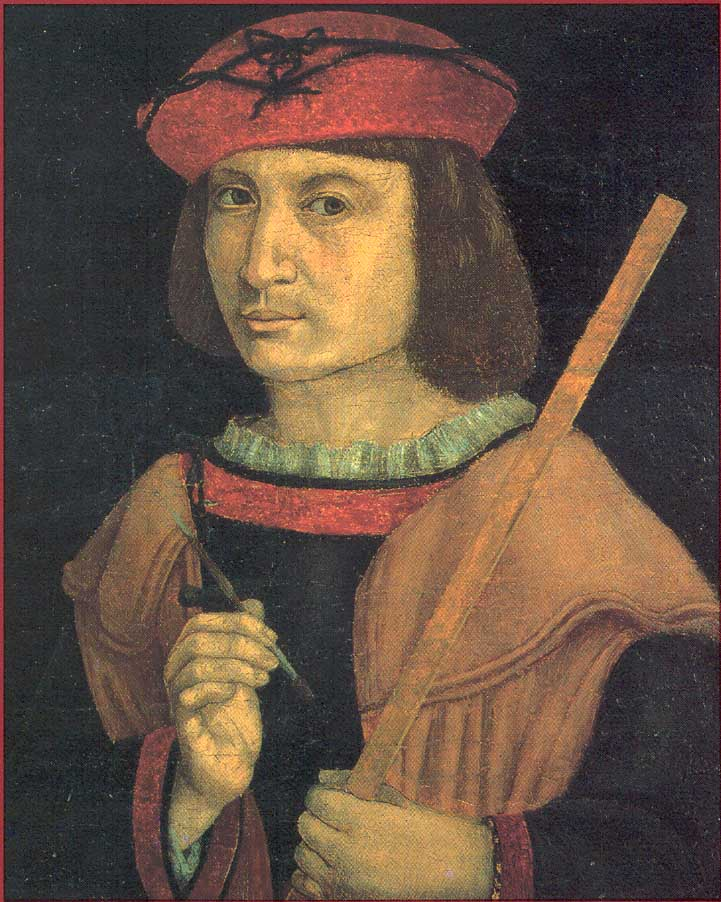
Self-portrait

Macrino d'Alba (c. 1460–1465 – c. 1510–1520) was an Italian painter of the Renaissance period, active mainly in Piedmont, who is known for his altarpieces and portraits. His birth name was Gian Giacomo de' Alladio.

== Life ==
The lack of documentary sources on Macrino who is believed to have been born in Alba has led in the past to many dubious attributions of works from the Piedmont area to this painter. A more thorough critique has allowed to lift some of the uncertainty about his biography. It is now known that he was in fact called Gian Giacomo de 'Alladio and was nicknamed 'Macrino' probably because of his slim and gaunt build. His Self-portrait (Torino, Museo Civico d'Arte Antica) does not throw much light on the question of his build. He was a descendant of a family with some social status in Alba.

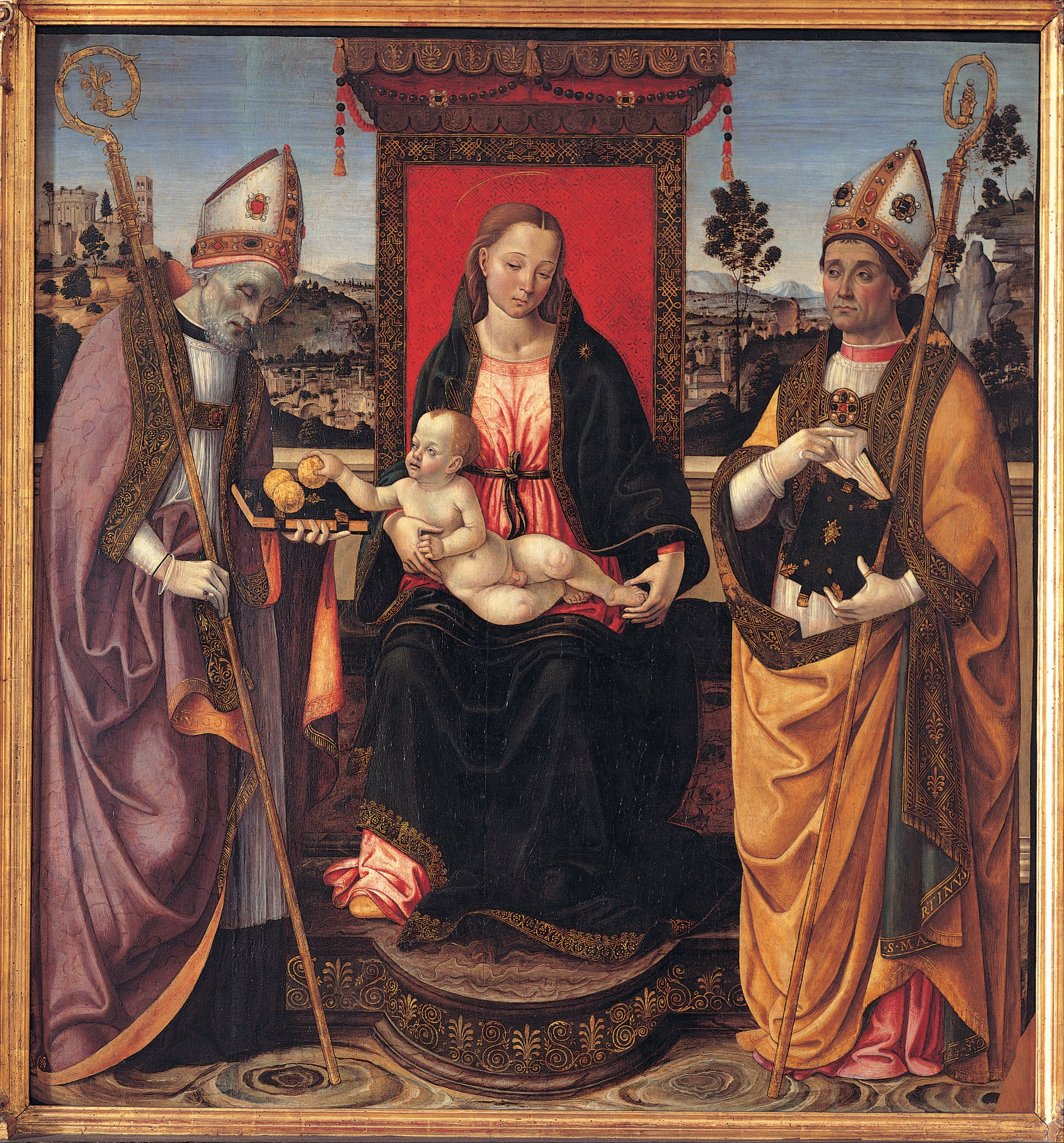
Holy Conversation

Nothing is known about his artistic training in his native city and he may well have trained elsewhere. It is believed he was in Rome around 1490. Even so, the actual formation of Macrino was obtained from his study of Tuscan and Umbrian masters such as Luca Signorelli and Perugino who worked at the papal seat.

== Work ==
Macrino was an eclectic painter and an assimilator of aesthetic trends that had developed in Rome and Tuscany and had given birth to the Italian Renaissance.

His work shows in particular a stylistic affinity with that of Pinturicchio, which has given rise to the hypothesis that Macrino frequented his workshop. There he must have learned the use of bright colours and the placing of his scenes among bold Renaissance architecture and landscapes rich in Roman ruins and "antiques". Also on the technical plan the use of hatching with a very lean tempera layer under a detailed design made by brush was probably learned from Pinturicchio.

He painted the Resurrection for the chapel of Sant’Ugone at the Certosa di Pavia. He also painted in the church of San Francesco at Alba and worked in the Vigevano Cathedral. He achieved an artistic high-point in the altarpiece of the Virgin Enthroned between SS John the Baptist and James, a Bishop Saint and St Jerome (1503, Casale Monferrato, Santuario Crea). The composition is sober and dignified, full of light and colour.
