= San Pietro dei Pellegrini, Milan =

Church in Milan, Italy

Coordinates: 45°27′14″N 9°11′57″E

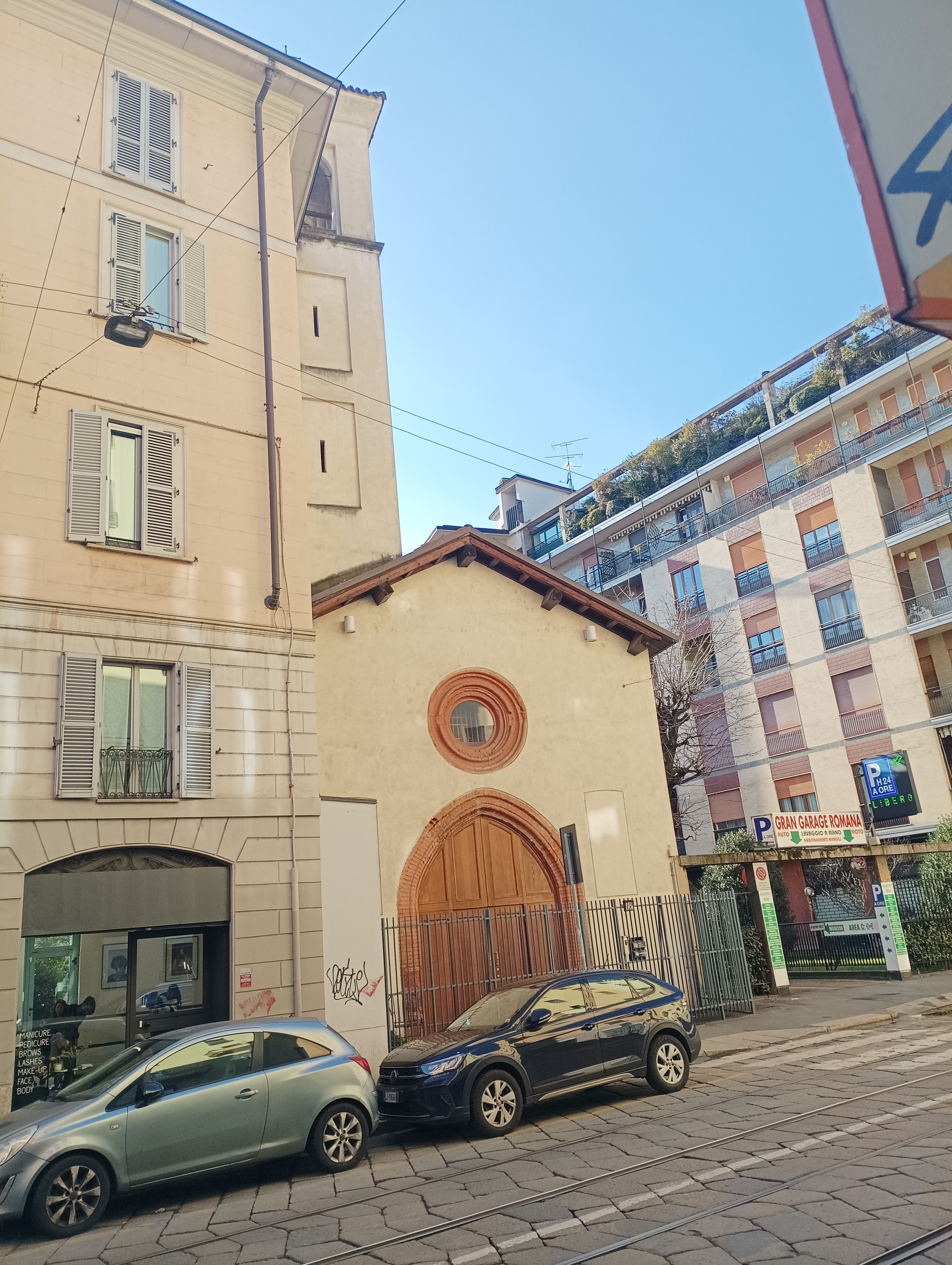
The Church

Chiesa di San Pietro dei Pellegrini (English: Church of St. Peter of the Pilgrims) is a historic former church in Milan, Italy.

It was founded in the 14th century by priest Ambrogio Varese to help those pilgrims going to Rome using the via Emilia, with money from Bernabò Visconti.

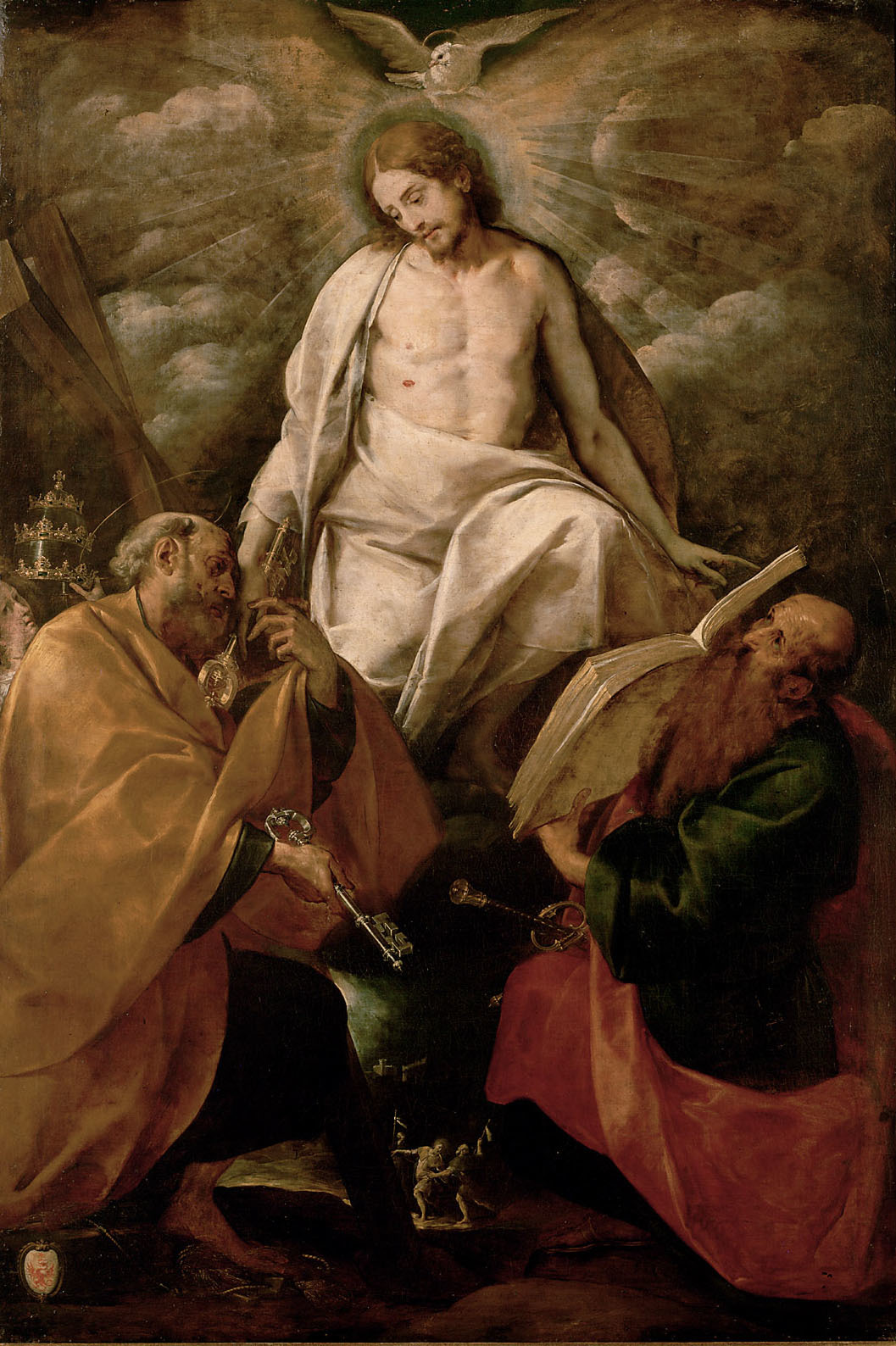
Christ Appears to the Apostles Peter and Paul, originally in the San Pietro dei Pellegrini, as of 2025 in the Kunsthistorisches Museum, Vienna

Around 1626, the Church commissioned a painting, Christ Appears to the Apostles Peter and Paul by Giovanni Battista Crespi, which has since been acquired by the Kunsthistorisches Museum, Vienna.

It has a simple gabled façade and retains the large original terracotta portal surmounted by a rose window. The interior has a single nave in the middle and two side chapels. At the beginning of the 20th century, 15th century frescoes were discovered in the counter-façade between the vault and the roof with busts of saints inserted within the arches of a painted loggia.

It was deconsecrated in the early 20th century, and is currently privately owned. The interior is not accessible to the public, but the campanile is visible from several directions.
