= Cesare Magni =

Italian painter

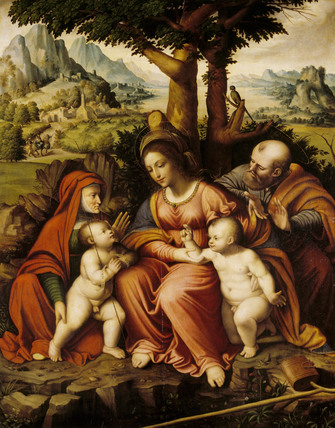
The Holy Family with St Elizabeth and St John the Baptist by Cesare Magni, Attingham Park, Shropshire

Cesare Magni or Magno (c.1495–1534) was an Italian painter of the Leonardeschi school. He was born and died in Milan, and was an illegitimate son of Francesco Magni, a member of a well-known family of that city.

In 2025 the Italian art magazine Artribune published an article in which it is hypothesized that a small chapel near Milan, San Galdino in Zelo Surrigone, built within 1518, may have been Cesare Magni's first work. Proof of that could be the Magni coat of arms painted in the frescoed vault.

== Works ==
- St Apollonia (1526, untraced), for Santa Maria presso San Celso, Milan
- Altarpiece of the Virgin and Child with St Peter and St Jerome (c.1530, Pinacoteca Ambrosiana, Milan)
- The Holy Family with St Elizabeth and St John (c.1530, National Trust, Attingham Park)
- Crucifixion (1531, Vigevano Cathedral)
- Virgin and Child with St Peter Martyr and St Vincent Ferrer (1531, San Biagio, Codogno)
- Fresco, St Martin and St George (1533, Madonna dei Miracoli, Saronno)
- Fresco, Virgin and Child with St Sebastian and St Roch (1533, Berlin), for the oratory of San Rocco, Codogno
