= Vigevano Cathedral =

Church building in Vigevano, Italy

Coordinates: 45°19′01″N 8°51′32″E

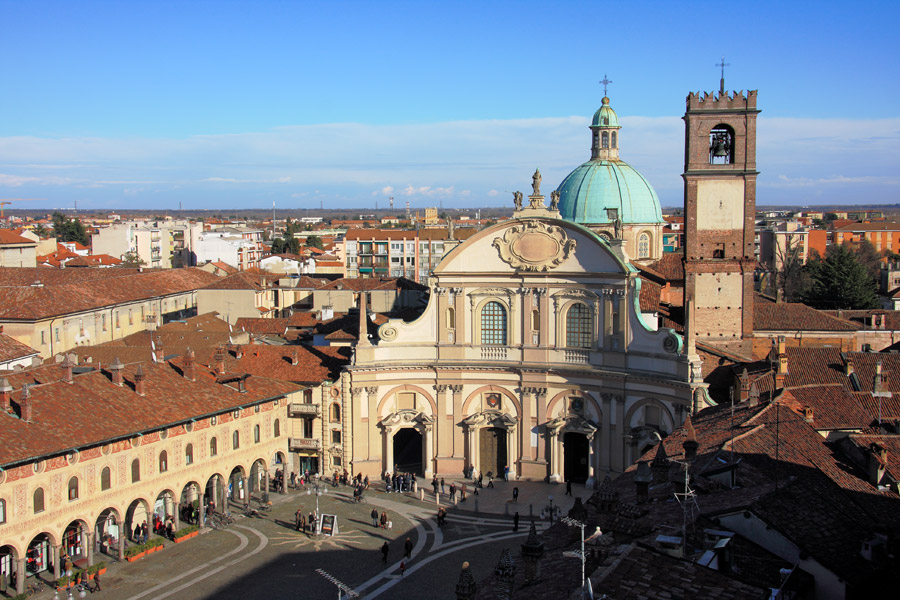
Church façade on Piazza Ducale, view from Bramante Tower.

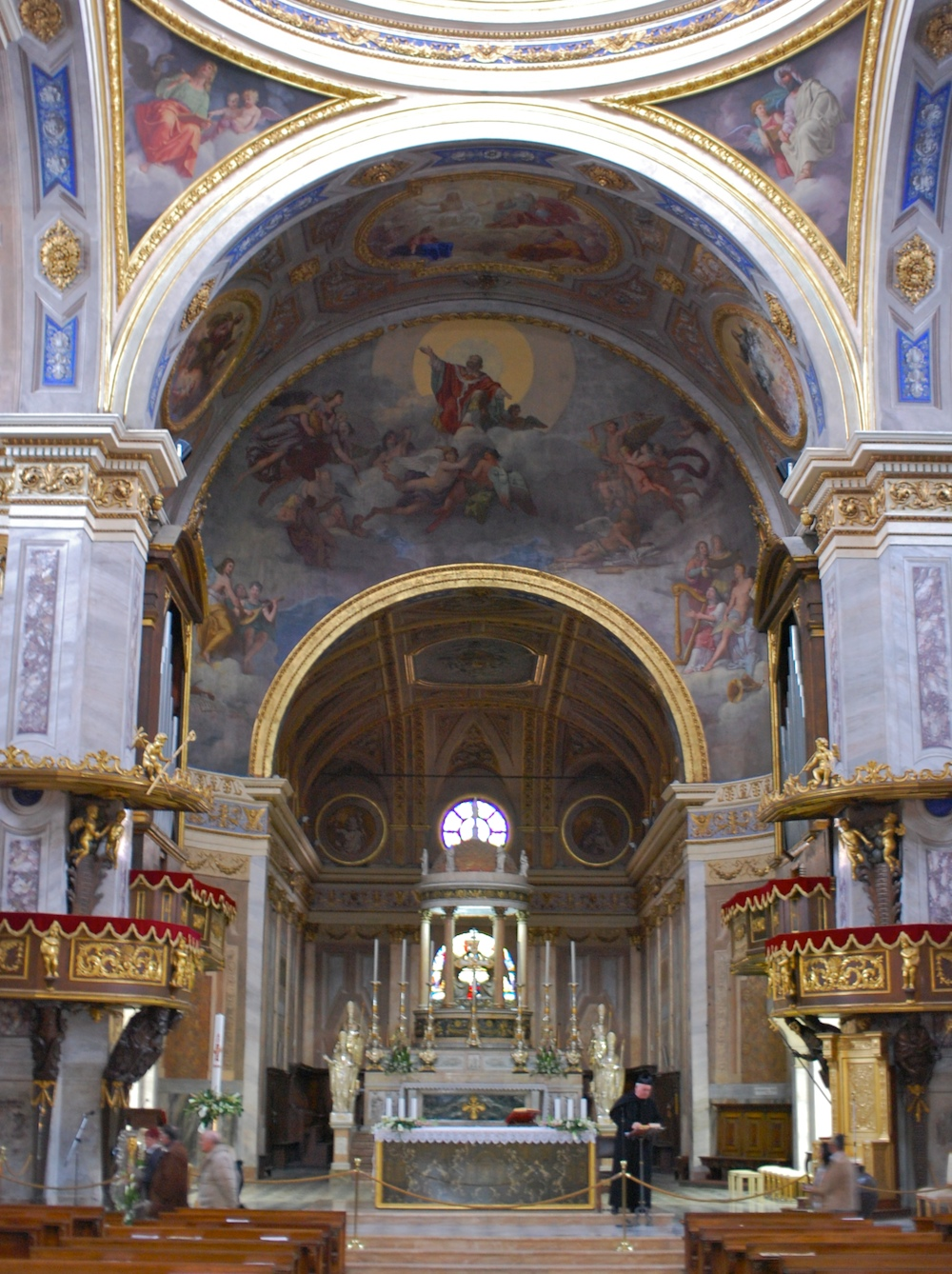
High altar

Vigevano Cathedral (Italian: Duomo di Vigevano, Cattedrale di Sant'Ambrogio) is a Roman Catholic cathedral dedicated to Saint Ambrose and located in the Piazza Ducale of Vigevano, Italy. It is the seat of the Bishop of Vigevano. The present building dates from the 16th century, with a west front of the 1670s.

== History ==
The initial structure on the site was built before the year 1000 and is referred to in documents of as early as 963 and 967.

The current structure was commissioned by Duke Francesco II Sforza in c. 1530 and is dedicated to Saint Ambrose. Construction on the cathedral, designed by Antonio da Lonate (c. 1456 c.–c. 1541), began in 1532 but was not completed until 1612. The edifice of the cathedral was completed in 1606 and it was consecrated on 24 April 1612.

The Spanish Bishop of Vigevano, Juan Caramuel y Lobkowitz, redesigned the west front of Vigevano Cathedral, work which began in 1673 and was completed c. 1680. The only architectural work known to be done by Caramuel, his design displays virtuosity, an eclectic sense, and an interesting geometrical relationship to the square which is cleverly adjusted to bring the ancient cathedral into a line perpendicular to and centered on the axis of the piazza.

== Description ==
The interior is designed on the Latin cross plan, with the nave containing a central aisle and two side aisles, and houses works by Macrino d'Alba, Bernardino Ferrari and others, as well as a tempera polyptych of the school of Leonardo da Vinci.

The second chapel of the left nave, dedicated to Saints James and Christopher, in addition to a valuable seventeenth-century altar, houses the Biffignandi Polyptych, by Bernardo Ferrari, composed of six panels depicting: Madonna with Child and Angels, Deposition, St. Dominic, St. Francis, St. James the Great and St. John, beyond the predella with the doctors of the church, enclosed in a splendid setting. Above, the coat of arms of the Biffignandi family testifies to the patronage of the chapel, rebuilt in the nineteenth century.

Below a predella, whose original provenance is unknown, is composed of two lateral paintings with two prophets holding scrolls and a central panel with three scenes, painted in a single panel divided by golden stripes: Joseph lowered into the cistern, Jonah thrown into the water, swallowed by the whale, Moses and the bronze serpent. Made in the first half of the 17th century by a local painter, probably Bernardo Ferrari himself, shows a happy narrative taste and a color that recall Gaudenzian influences.

In the chapel of St. Charles or of the Blessed Sacrament, two other recently restored works by the painter from Vigevano are preserved: the Gusberti Triptych and a Saint Thomas of Canterbury between saints Helen and Agatha. The Madonna with Child between Saint Bernardino, Saint Clare and the Blessed Cristoforo Maccasoli, dated 1502 but unsigned, comes from the convent church of Madonna delle Grazie near Paragella, destroyed in 1805. It is attributed to the Piedmontese Renaissance painter Macrino d'Alba; although it does not present the chromatic liveliness of the polyptych of the Certosa di Pavia, it shows a certain analogy with this one.

The panel with the Crucifixion and saints is one of the few works dated and signed at the bottom right "CAESAR MAGNUM FACIEBAT AN 1531" by the painter Cesare Magni, follower of Leonardo. It was donated by Duke Francesco II Sforza as shown in the deed of donation dated 13 March 1534 in the Capitular Archives. Above, the earthly Christ is surrounded by flying angels. On the left the Virgin in a bright red robe and blue mantle, while Saint Ambrose in pontifical vestments presents the Bishop Galeazzo Pietra in an arabesque cope. On the right, Magdalene in a blue dress and red cloak, Saint John and Saint Jerome, with a thick beard. In the background, countries, figures and knights fading into blue.

An interesting painting from the 16th century in Lombardy is the Redeemer on the Globe with the Madonna and Saint John the Baptist, attributed to Bernardino Gatti (ca. 1495/ 1576), known as Soiaro.

The funerary monument of Galeazzo Pietra, first bishop of Vigevano from 1530 to 1552, of a Pavia workshop, was built by the hand of a Bernardo Romano, probably a close relative of Cristoforo Romano. Previously located in the presbytery, it was moved during the restorations of 1828/30 with the addition of the stone between the sarcophagus and the inscription.

The nineteenth-century painter Francesco Gonin chose light colors and gilding for the frescoes on the vault, which depict the life of St. Ambrose, to whom the cathedral is dedicated.

Also of great interest is the pipe organ located in the presbytery, in the right choir, built in 1782 by the Serassi of Bergamo.

== Treasury ==
The cathedral is best known for the "treasury" donated to it by Francesco II Sforza in 1534 which encompasses more than 100 precious objects. These, along with other items, are on display in a museum inside the cathedral known as the Museo del Tesoro del Duomo Vigevano. Of note in the collection are several Flemish tapestries, seven of which were made by tapestry makers in Brussels in 1520 in the Late Gothic International Style and five of which were woven in Oudenarde at the beginning of the 17th century. Also on exhibit are an ornate crosier in ivory, a gold-plated silver reliquary of the Lombardy school of goldsmiths from c. 1530, numerous precious corals, missals, codices and manuscripts dating from the late 15th century, and many chalices, goblets, monstrances and reliquaries in different styles and from different eras. Also of interest is a 16th-century wall-hanging embroidered in gold which was used in Monza in 1805 for the coronation of Napoleon Bonaparte.

== Organ ==
The church's first organ was built by Gian Giacomo Antegnati in 1554. Composer Antonio Cagnoni notably served as the cathedral's maestro di cappella from 1852-1879.
