= Giovanni da Milano =

Italian painter

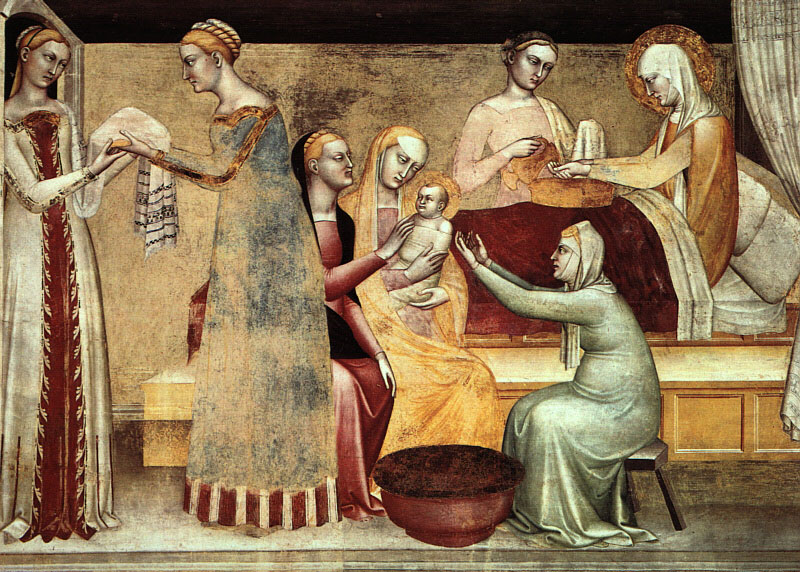
Birth of the Virgin, Rinuccini Chapel, Santa Croce, Florence

Giovanni da Milano (Giovanni di Jacopo di Guido da Caversaccio) was an Italian painter, known to be active in Florence and Rome between 1346 and 1369.

His style is, like many Florentine painters of the time, considered to be derivative of Giotto's. Vasari misidentified him as a student of Taddeo Gaddi, a noted Giotto protégé.

Hailing from Lombardy, the earliest documentation shows Giovanni in Florence on October 17, 1346, under the name Johannes Jacobi de Commo, listed amongst the foreign painters living in Tuscany.

Amongst Giovanni's most significant works:

- A polyptych with Madonna and Saints (c. 1355), the oldest known signed work by Giovanni da Milano, painted for the Prato Spedale della Misericordia
- A polyptych made for the Ognissanti of Florence (c. 1363), now dismembered and scattered, depicting saints and scenes of the biblical creation myth
- Man of Sorrows panel (c. 1365, Accademia, Florence), the oldest known signed and dated work
- Frescoes decorating both sides of the Rinuccini Chapel in Santa Croce, Florence. Each side consists of five scenes – one side depicting the Life of the Virgin and the other the Life of Mary Magdalene. Giovanni is credited with the upper two registers of each cycle. The bottom register is credited to Matteo di Pacino.

The latest extent documentation of Giovanni's career comes in 1369, when he is known to be working in Rome for Pope Urban V with Giottino and the sons of Taddeo Gaddi.
