= Giovanni Battista Crespi =

Italian painter, sculptor and architect

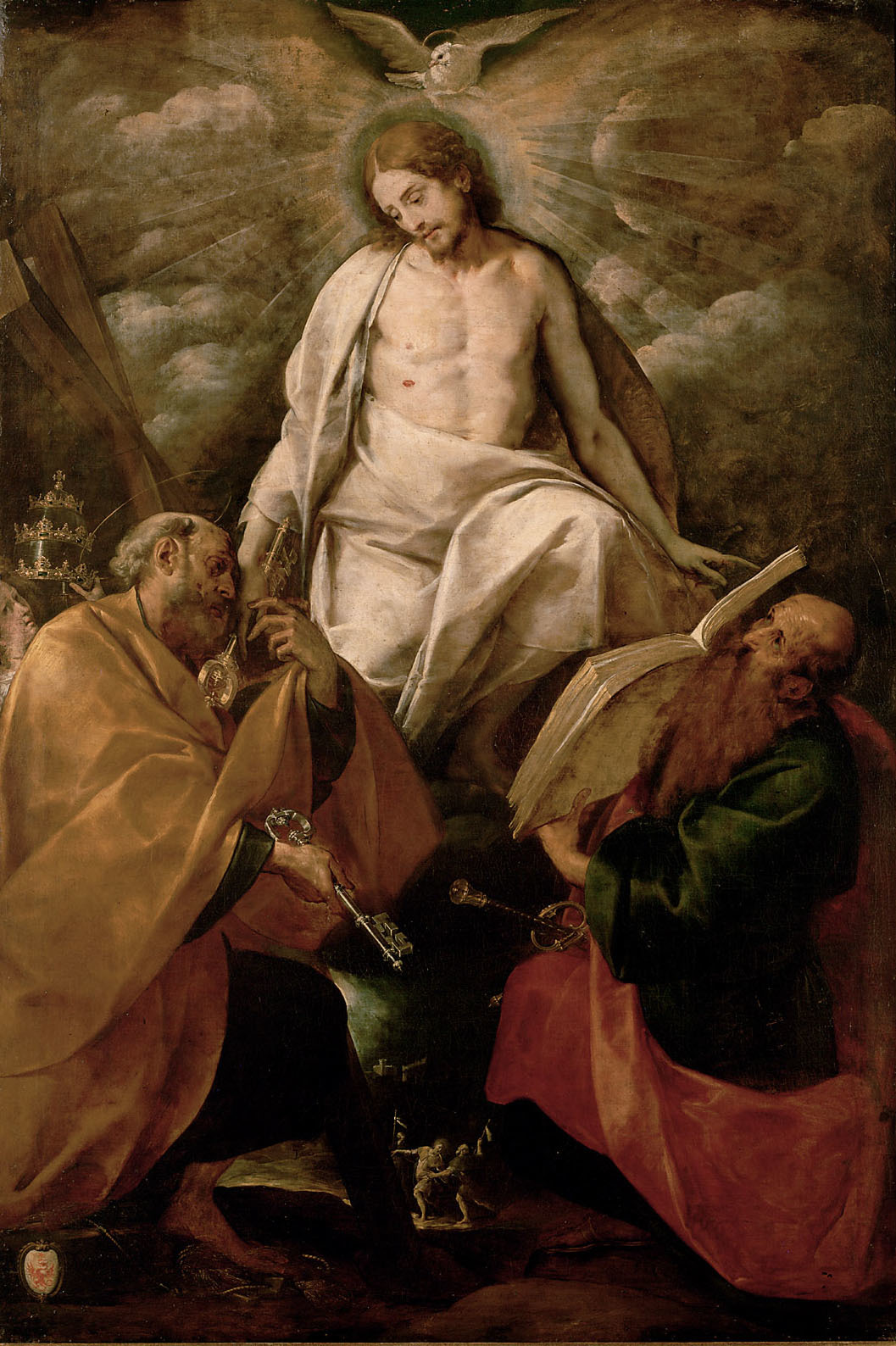
- Christ Appears to the Apostles Peter and Paul, Kunsthistorisches Museum, Vienna
- Born: 23 December 1573; Romagnano Sesia, Duchy of Milan
- Died: 23 October 1632 (aged 58); Milan, Duchy of Milan
- Other name: Il Cerano
- Known for: Painting
- Notable work: Sancarlone
- Movement: Mannerism; Baroque

Giovanni Battista Crespi (23 December 1573 – 23 October 1632), called Il Cerano, was an Italian painter, sculptor, and architect. He is one of the most prominent of the Milanese artists of the early 17th century whose work represents a transitional phase between Mannerism and Baroque. He was highly esteemed in his day and patronized by the Fabbrica of Milan Cathedral, the civic authorities and highly distinguished private patrons, such as the Borromeo and Gonzaga families and the House of Savoy.

== Biography ==
=== Early career, to 1603 ===
He was born in Romagnano Sesia, the son of Raffaele Crespi, a minor decorative fresco painter, and moved to Cerano with his family some years later. On 14 December 1591 a Giovanni Battista Crespi was paid for paintings (untraced) in three rooms of the Palazzo Borromeo, Milan. Although the name was not uncommon, this could well refer to Cerano, perhaps working with his father.

Cerano’s first securely identifiable works are frescoes and altarpieces done after 1594 in Cerano, Trecate and Mortara, small towns south of Novara. The Last Supper (Cerano, parish church) is a delicate variant of two compositions that the artist would have known: one by Gaudenzio Ferrari (1544; Milan, Santa Maria della Passione), the other by Ferrari’s close follower, Bernardino Lanini (1548; Milan, San Nazaro Maggiore). In Cerano’s Coronation of the Virgin (Trecate, oratory of the Gonfalone), the Adoration of the Shepherds (ex-San Giuseppe, Mortara; Turin, Galleria Sabauda) and the frescoes and stucco statues of St. John the Baptist and St. Dominic in the church of the Madonna di Campagna, Mortara, the rhythmic, flattened forms typical of Ferrari and followers seem to have been further sharpened through a study of the northern European Mannerists, whose prints were being circulated in Italy from the last decades of the 16th century.

It is usually thought that Cerano went to Rome in the mid-1590s. There, judging from certain pink and yellow tones that he adopted, he must have seen Federico Barocci’s work. By the late 1590s, Cerano was established in Milan. In 1598, Cardinal Federico Borromeo involved him in the planning of a colossal statue of St. Charles Borromeo for Arona, Piedmont, and later the same year, he was commissioned to produce the altarpiece St. John the Evangelist for Milan Cathedral. The work was later executed by Cerano’s son-in-law and assistant, Melchiorre Gherardini. Other altarpieces of this period by Cerano are the Franciscan Saints (1600; ex-Bode Museum, Berlin, destr. 1945) and the Baptism (1601; Frankfurt am Main, Städel).

In 1602, the Veneranda Fabbrica del Duomo di Milano, as part of a campaign to canonize Charles Borromeo, commissioned a series of 20 large canvases of scenes from his life, the so-called Quadroni of St. Charles (1602–4; Milan Cathedral). Cerano painted four of them, two in 1602 and two in 1603. These enormous pictures, hung high along the nave and displayed annually in the week preceding the saint’s feast (4 November), are strongly coloured with reds, blacks, yellows and greens. They effectively demonstrate Cerano’s skill at the manipulation of scale. St. Charles Borromeo Visiting the Plague-stricken (1602) is a tightly composed picture with looming foreground figures abruptly juxtaposed with smaller figures in the middle ground, knitted into a flat, strongly rhythmic whole. Cerano’s sensitivity to pattern, based on sharp changes of scale, may have been influenced by Pellegrino Tibaldi’s lost work in the neighbouring Palazzo Ducale. These paintings may be seen as the culmination of the first phase of Cerano’s work.

=== Years of consolidation, 1603–10 ===
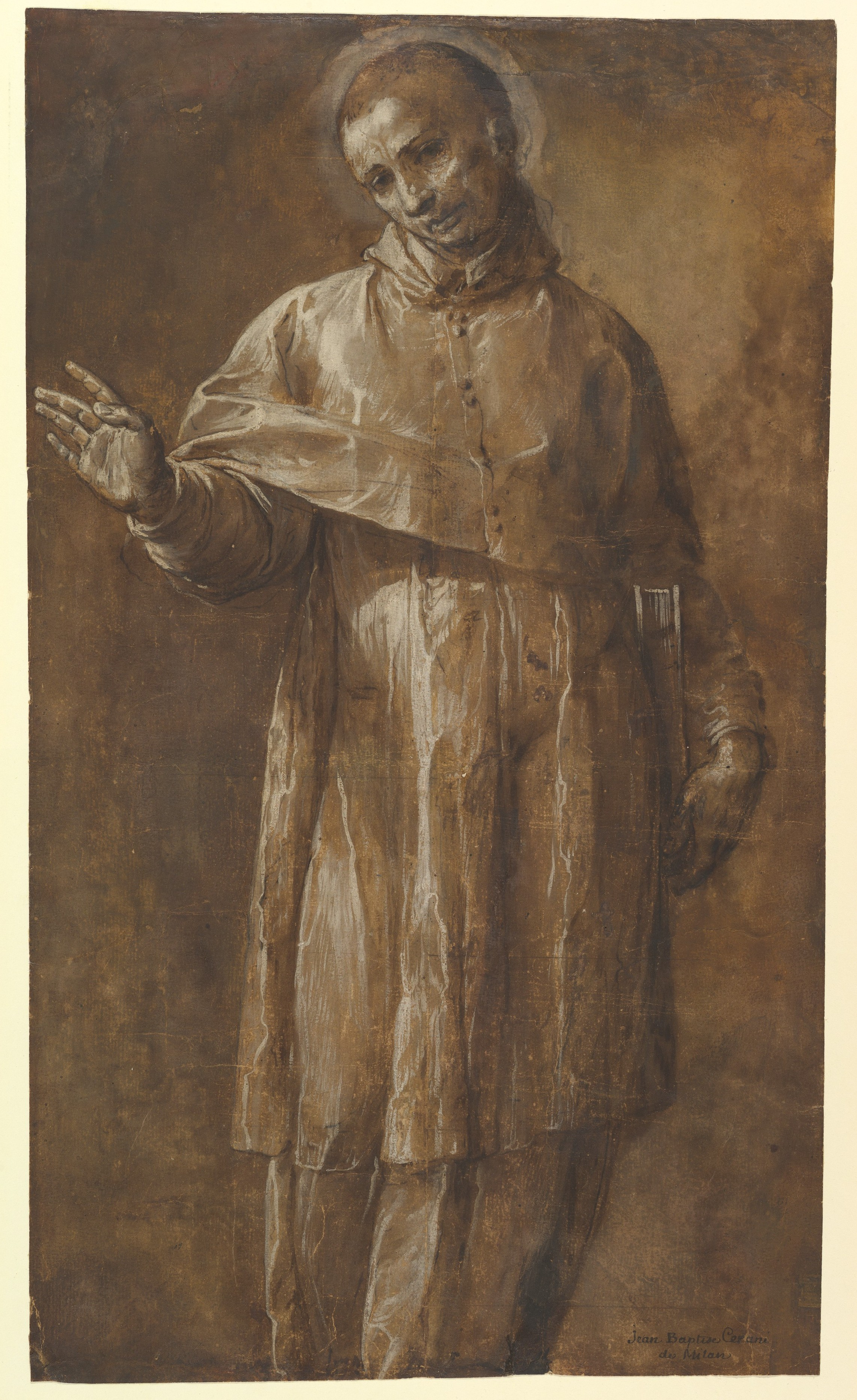
St. Charles Borromeo, Metropolitan Museum of Art, New York

In 1603, Cerano designed and executed the stuccos for the vaults of four chapels in Santa Maria presso San Celso, Milan; the vault frescoes – of angels, prophets, sibyls and ignudi – occupied him until 1607. In 1606, he painted an Annunciation and a Visitation for festival decoration in the church (pictures now in the sacristy), and in June 1609, his Martyrdom of St. Catherine of Alexandria, in the same church, was recorded as finished. Giulio Cesare Procaccini was also working there, and in 1605 the two painters were jointly commissioned to decorate the chapel of the Tribunale di Provvisione, the seat of government offices in Milan.

This commission was much modified before its eventual completion as late as 1620, and Cerano’s contribution, St. John the Baptist with Angels (Milan, Sforza Castle), is usually dated c. 1610. To celebrate the canonization of Charles Borromeo in 1610, a further series of 24 large paintings, representing the saint’s miracles, was commissioned by the Veneranda Fabbrica del Duomo di Milano; Cerano was responsible for six of them. In preparation for the canonization ceremony, celebrated in St. Peter's Basilica, Rome, on 1 November 1610, he painted the two most important banners bearing the saint’s image and designed both the embroidery of the ecclesiastical vestments and the altar frontals, of which one survives (Milan Cathedral). His St. Ambrose (Milan, Pinacoteca Ambrosiana) was the most important of the 35 pictures set into a false frontal erected over the unfinished façade of St Peter’s for the ceremony.

Also in 1610, Cerano painted the Entombment (Novara, Musei Civici) for San Lorenzo dei Cappuccini and the Crucifixion with St. Ambrose, Mary Magdalene and St. Lawrence (Mortara, San Lorenzo). These altarpieces and the six paintings depicting St. Charles Borromeo’s miracles conclude the second phase of his career. Their compositions are simpler than those of earlier works, more balanced and symmetrical, while the figures are larger and less contorted; in them Cerano adopted the less eccentric early Baroque forms used by artists in Bologna, Genoa and Venice. This may have been due in part to his contact with Giulio Cesare Procaccini, who, although trained in Milan, came from a Bolognese family.

In the Miracle of Margherita Vertua and the Miracle of Aurelia degli Angeli (both 1610; Milan Cathedral), Cerano’s grave dramatic intensity is in contrast with the more mannered compositions of the first series on Carlo Borromeo. But, although he modified his earlier stylistic extremes, Cerano continued in his use of surface patterning and of sumptuous, sophisticated colouring. His work is high-keyed emotionally, and he never sought the calm clarity of form and narrative of the early Baroque. Instead, through an awareness of this style, he transformed his art so that its early, immediate appeal was lessened, while it gained a deeper, quieter expressiveness.

=== Work after 1610 ===
The first decade of the 17th century, so rich in documented major commissions, is followed by a period of seven to eight years, during which Cerano’s activity went virtually unrecorded. His designs for the façade of San Paolo alle Monache, Milan, may date from this time. Like the altar frontal of 1610, the façade is elegantly conceived in the Roman manner, with rich interlocking geometric forms and splendid decorative panels. Cerano’s design for a crystal casket for St. Charles Borromeo (Milan Cathedral) dates from 1614, though the casket was not completed until 1638.

Between 1616 and 1618, the artist was in contact with the Gonzaga family in Mantua, and he was probably there in September 1617. In his paintings of this period, Cerano sometimes returned to such Mannerist compositional devices as the inversion of scale and order of importance, as in the Mass of St. Gregory (before 1617; Varese, San Vittore) and the dated Baptism of St. Augustine (1618; Milan, San Marco). From the same period dates the nightmarish, St. Gregory Delivers the Soul of a Monk, also in San Vittore, Varese. Other, later, altarpieces, such as the Resurrected Christ with Saints (Meda, San Vittore) or Christ Adored by St. Peter and St. Paul (ex-San Pietro dei Pellegrini, Milan; Vienna, Kunsthistorisches Museum), both from the mid-1620s, are simple and symmetrical in composition, rarefied and serene in expression.

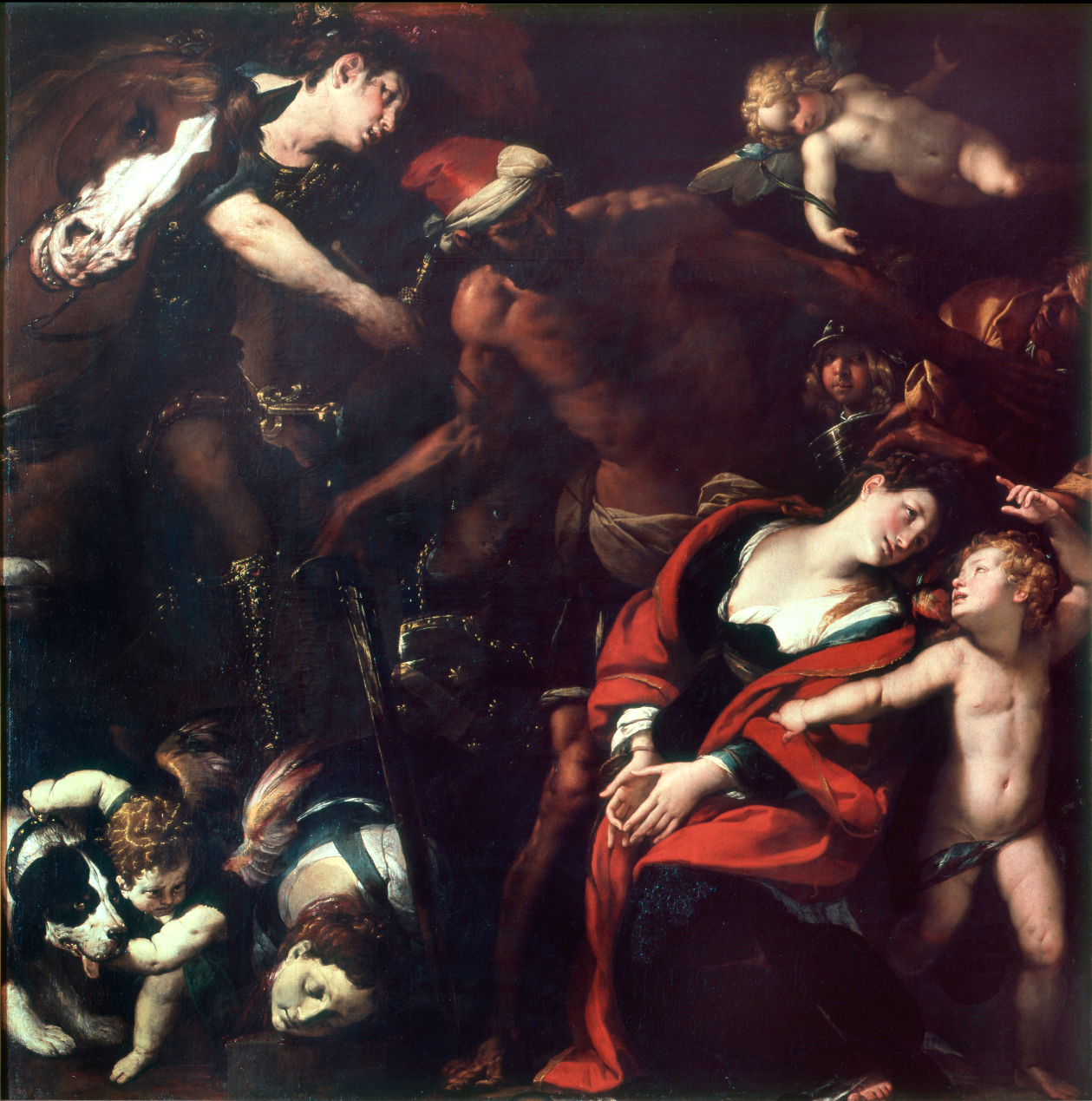
The Martyrdom of Saints Secunda and Rufina. Collaboration between Il Morazzone, Procaccini and Giovanni Battista Crespi

Cerano was also involved in one of the most famous cabinet pictures of his time, the Martyrdom of St. Rufina and St. Secunda (early 1620s; Milan, Pinacoteca di Brera), which was made in collaboration with Giulio Cesare Procaccini and Pier Francesco Mazzucchelli. This was a conscious connoisseur’s piece, deliberately counter-balancing the work of the three painters. During the third decade of the 17th century, Cerano was involved in widely varied activities, often in an official capacity.

From 1621 to 1623 he was professor of painting at the Accademia Ambrosiana, Milan, founded by Cardinal Federico Borromeo; in December 1624 he was halfway through restoring the banner of St. Ambrose, symbol of Milan (Milan, Sforza Castle), a work commissioned by the civic authorities; and in 1625 he made grisaille cartoons for five reliefs to surmount the main doors of the cathedral (Milan, Museo del Duomo). From 1630 to 1631, Cerano was supervisor of the Cathedral Works.

The paintings of these last years, which were often made in collaboration with Gherardini, are well documented. The Crucifixion with St. James, St. Philip and St. Francis (1628; Venegono Inferiore, Seminario Arcivescovile) is wholly autograph, whereas the Battle against the Albigensians (Cremona, Museo Civico Ala Ponzone), commissioned in April 1628, was partially finished by Gherardini, and the Marriage of the Virgin (San Giuseppe, Milan) and the Mysteries of the Rosary (Milan, Santa Maria del Vigentino), both in course of execution in 1629, are Gherardini’s work to Cerano’s design. A votive lunette of the Virgin Delivering Milan from the Plague (Santa Maria delle Grazie, Milan), a studio production to Cerano’s design, is datable to the year of his death.

Gherardini exploited his position as Cerano’s artistic heir well into the 1670s, with a vulgarized form of his master’s style. He seems to have been the chief assistant, but others may have included Cerano’s brother Ortensio (1608–31) and his daughter Camilla.

=== Critical assessment and legacy ===
True to the Counter-Reformation piety zealously expressed in Milanese art of his time, Cerano's paintings focus on mysteries and mystical episodes in saintly life. The crowded canvases and the angles recall Mannerism, but his paintings show an emotion that evokes common sentiments in Baroque art. Among his pupils were Daniele Crespi, Carlo Francesco Nuvolone, and Melchiorre Gherardini.

Paintings by Giovanni Battista Crespi

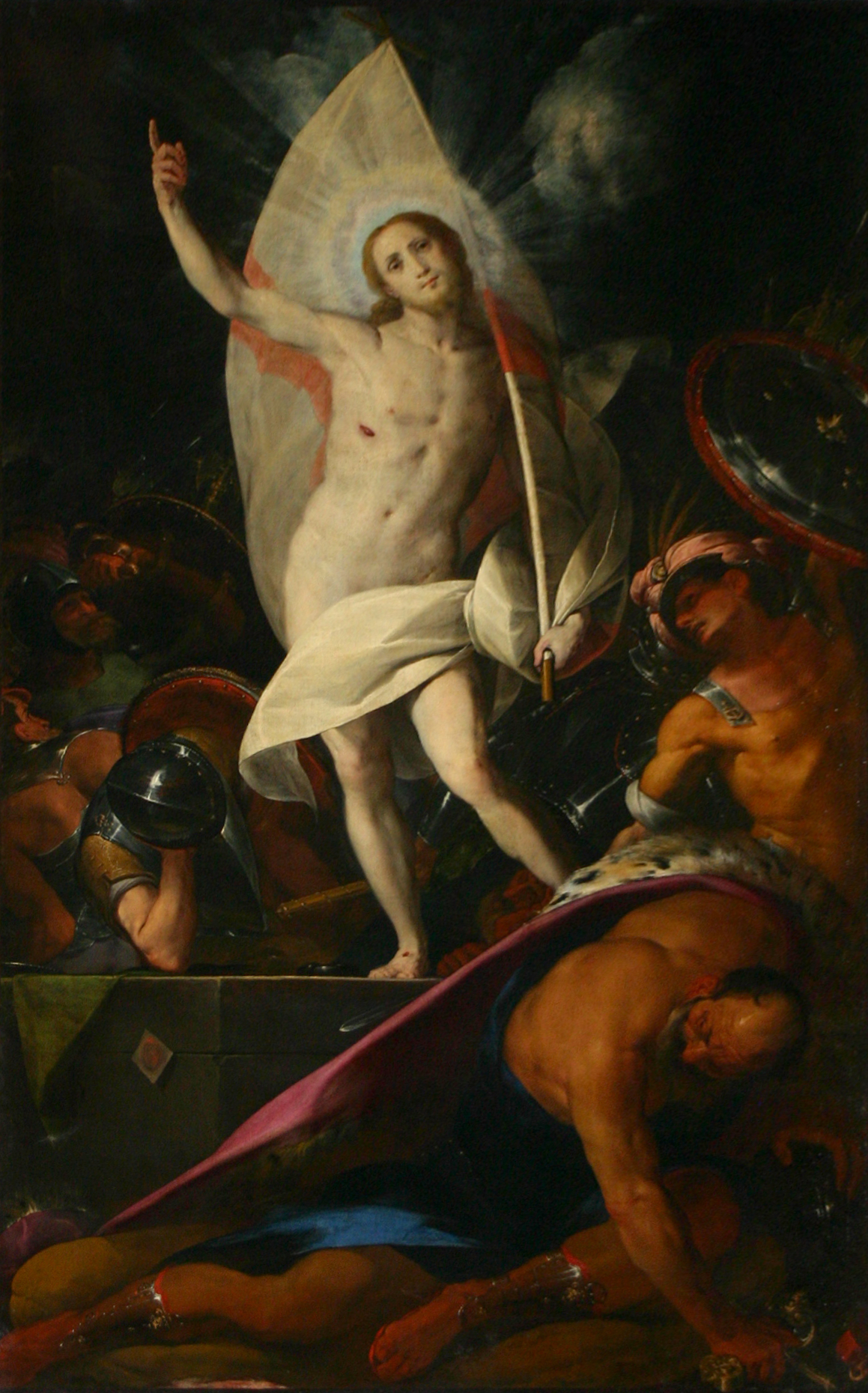
The Resurrection of Christ, Sant'Antonio Abate, Milan

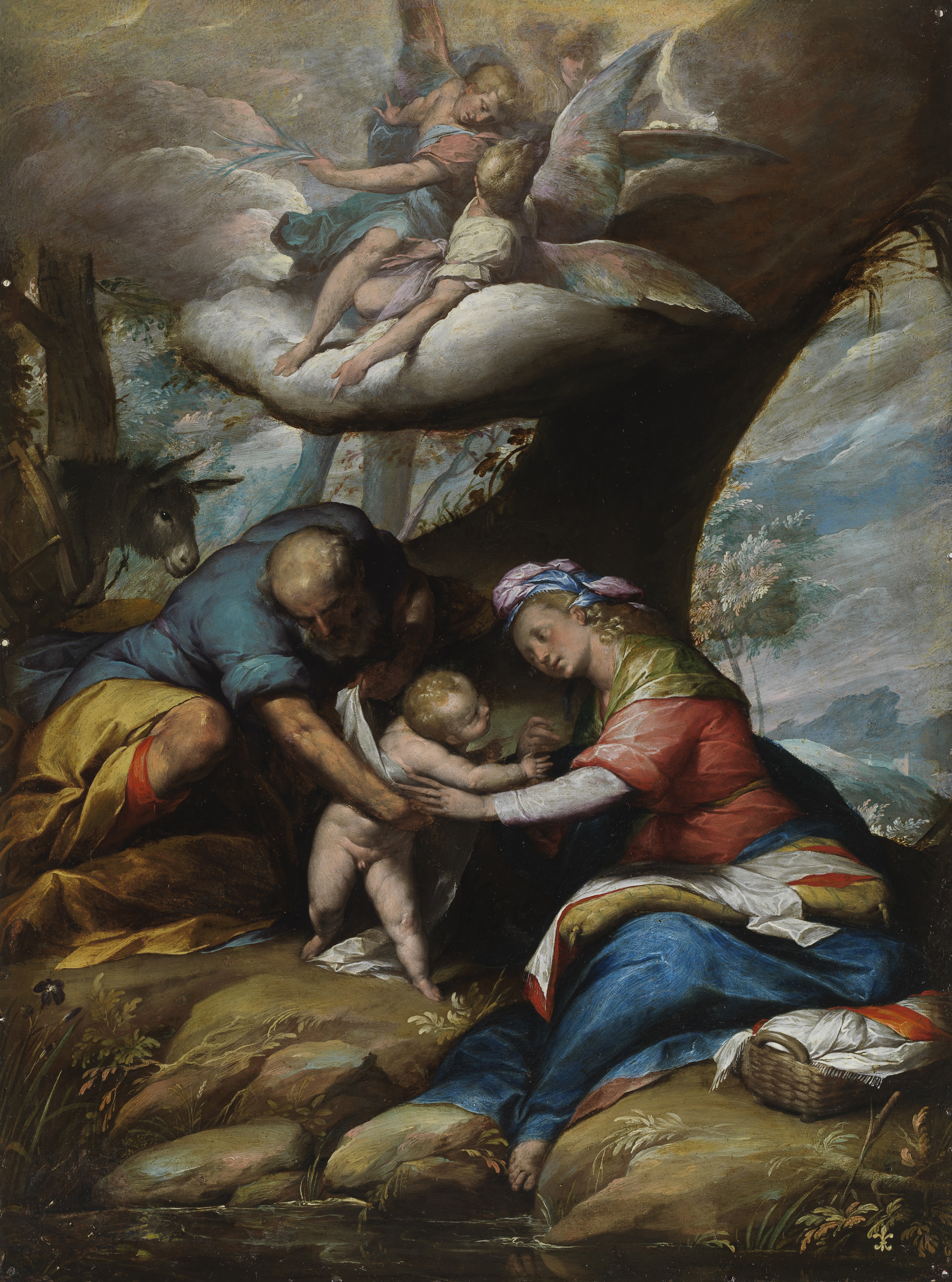
Rest on the Flight into Egypt, Museo del Prado, Madrid

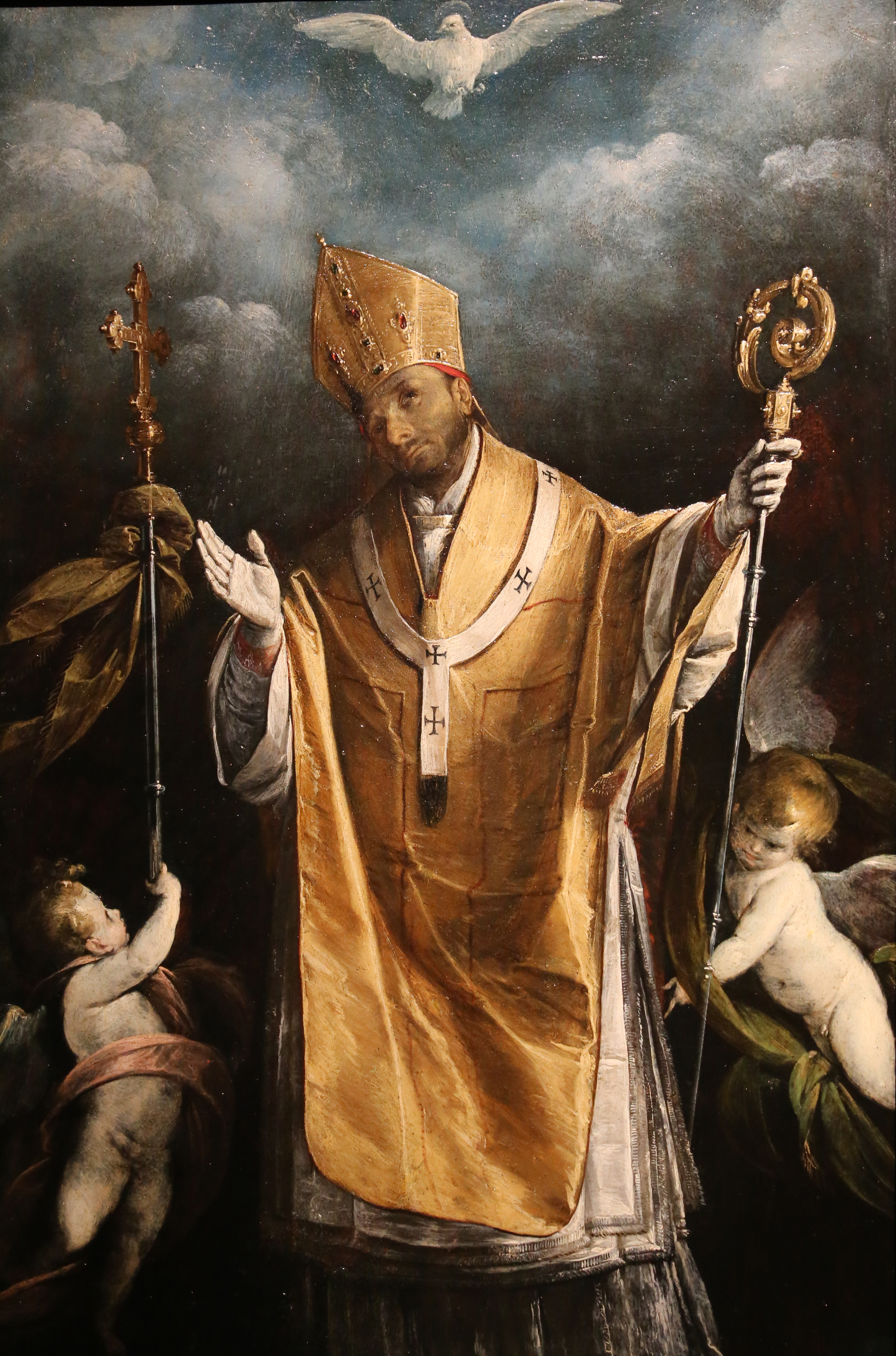
St. Charles in Glory, Diocesan Museum of Milan

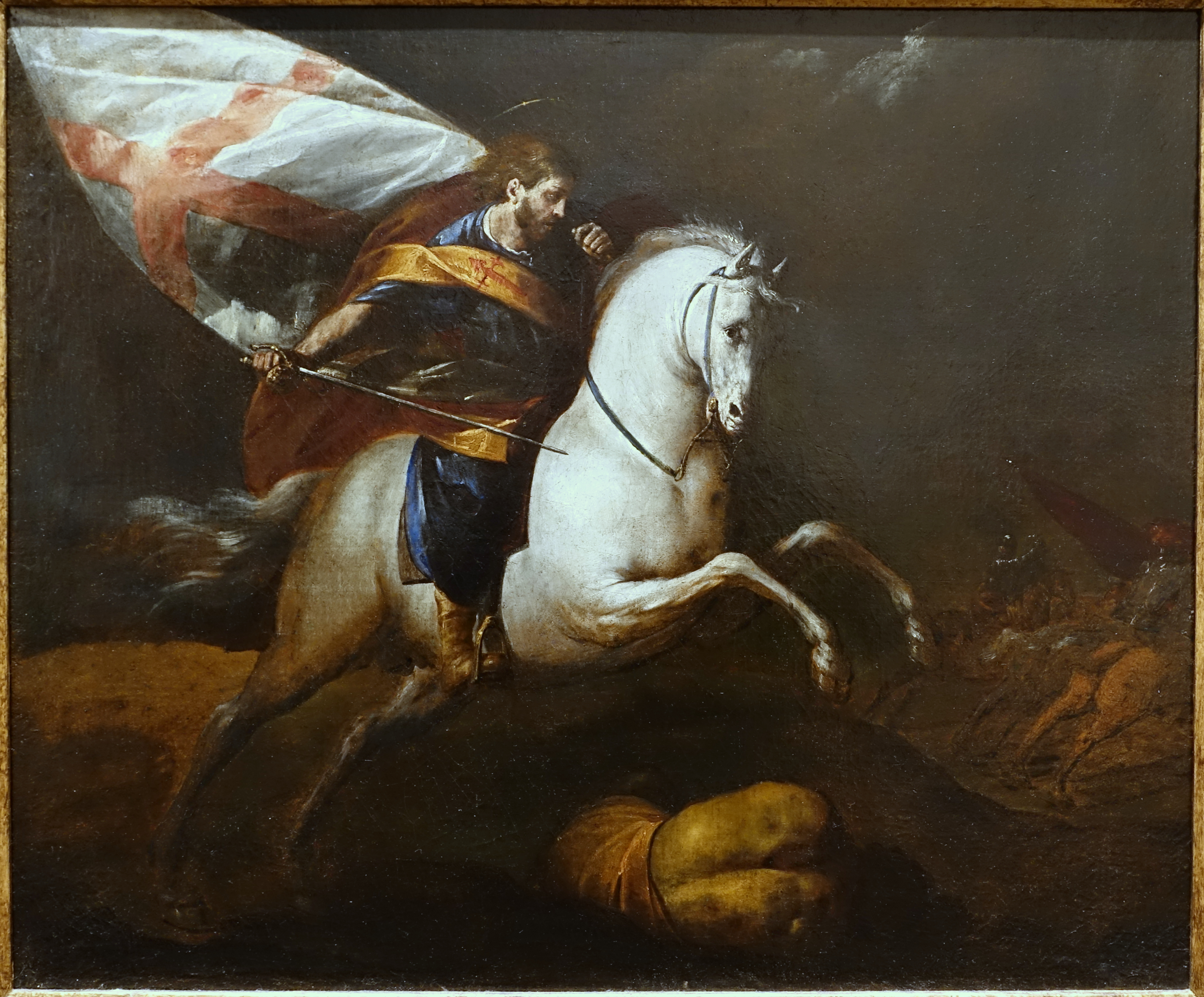
St. James Vanquishing the Moors, Blanton Museum of Art, Austin, Texas

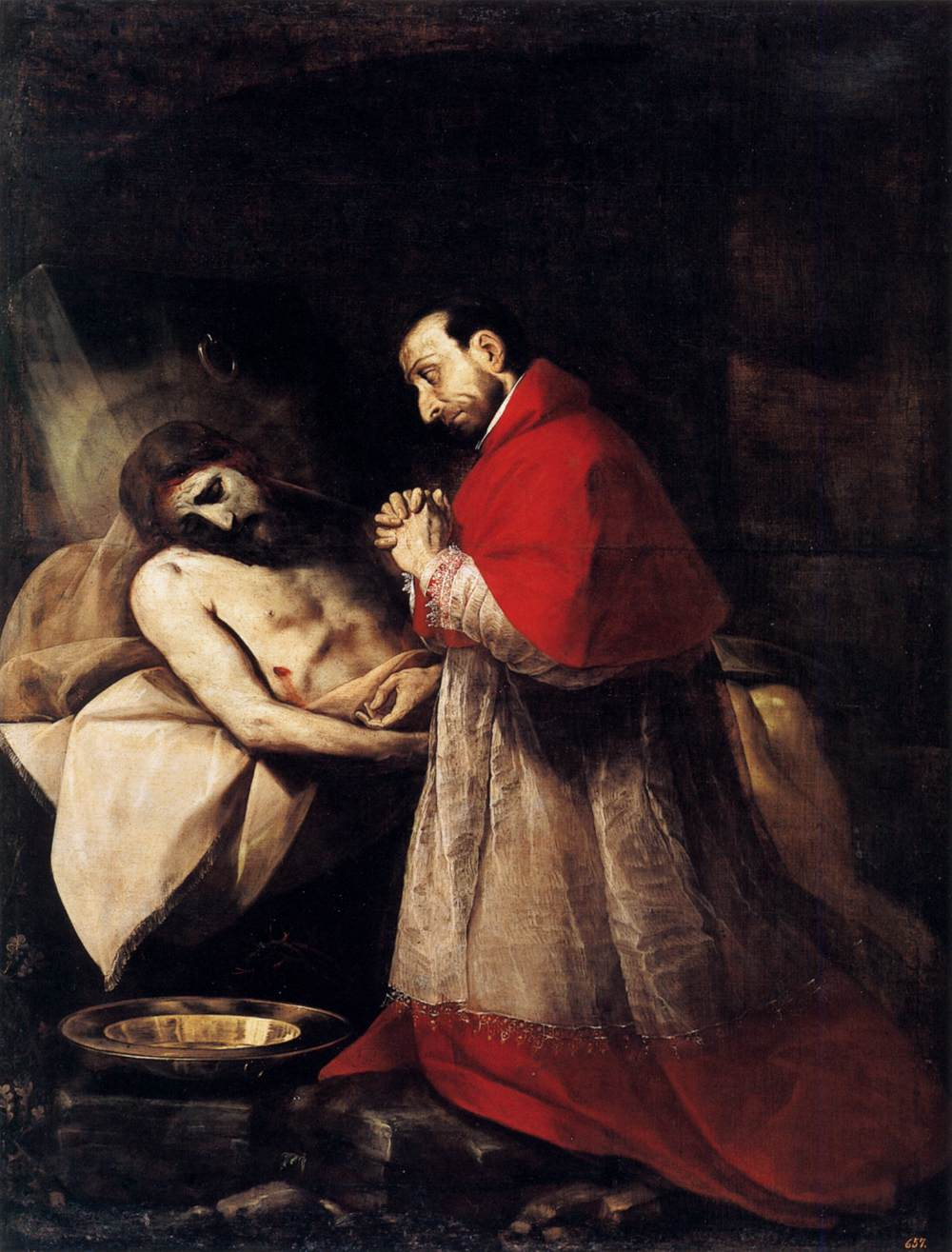
St. Charles Borromeo Adoring Christ, Museo del Prado, Madrid

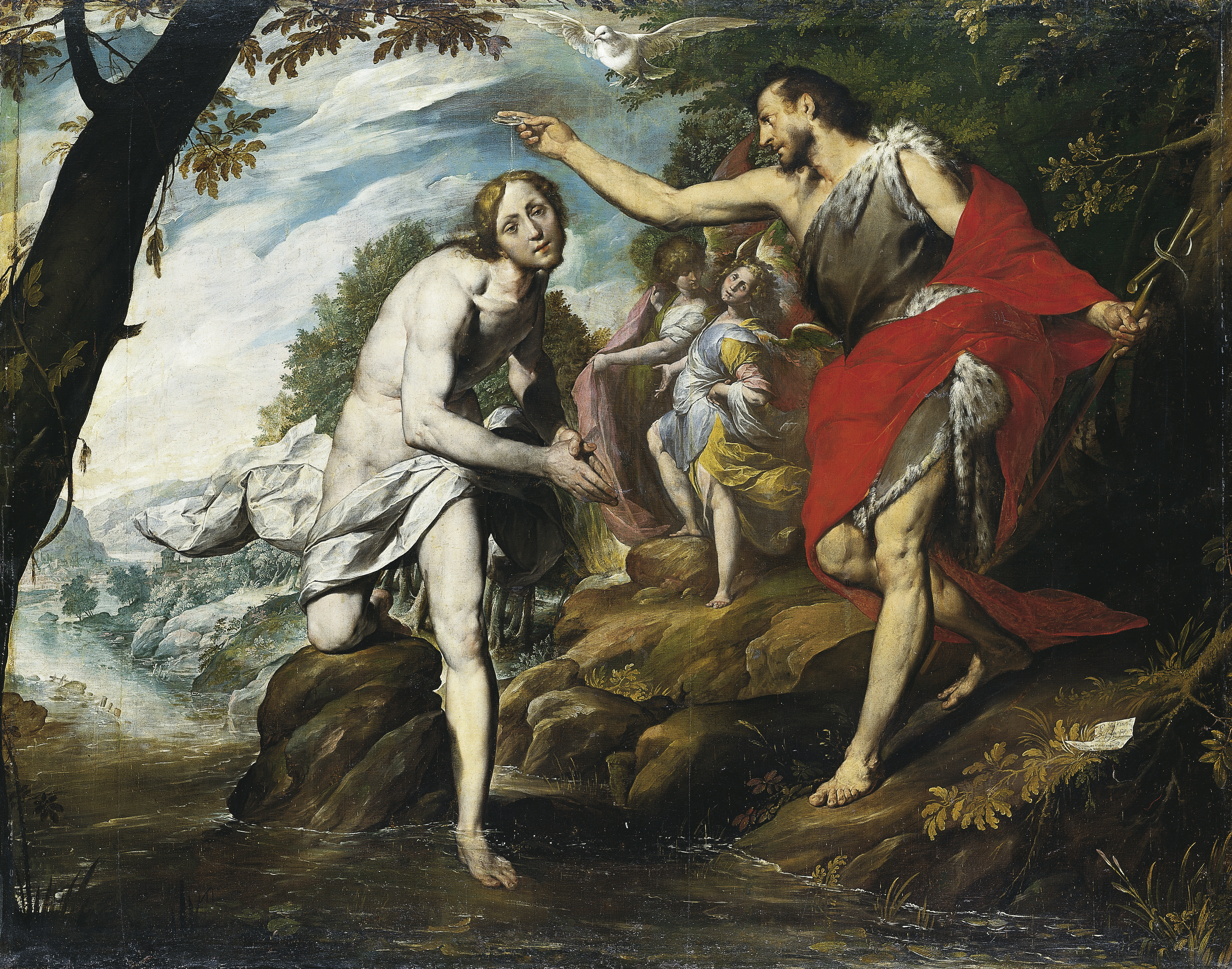
The Baptism of Christ, Städel, Frankfurt am Main

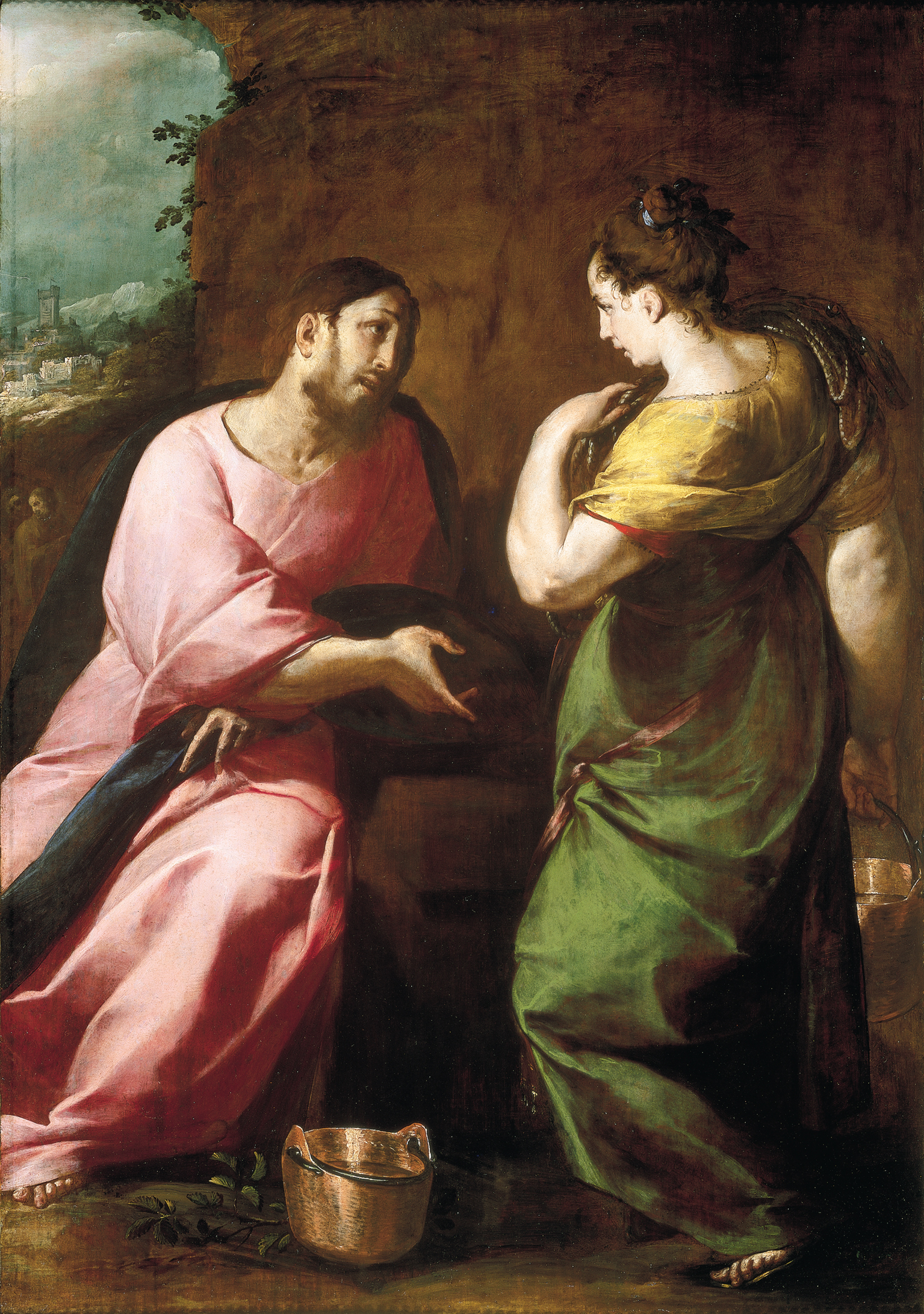
Christ and the Samaritan woman at the well, Koelliker priv. col., Milan

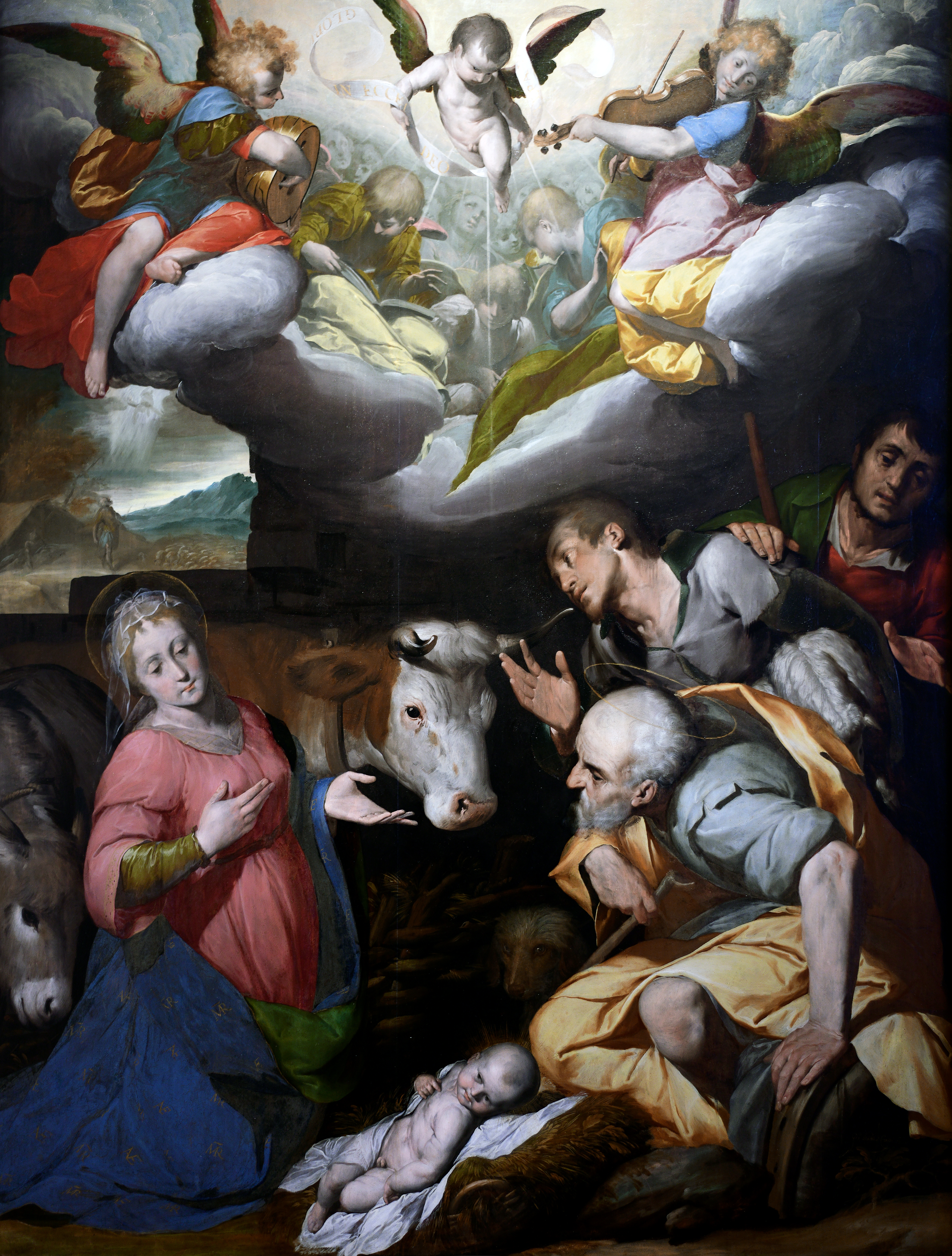
Adoration of the Shepherds, Galleria Sabauda, Turin
