= Porta Galliera, Bologna =

Coordinates: 44°30′15″N 11°20′41″E

Porta Galliera was a gate or portal of the former outer medieval walls of the city of Bologna, Italy. It is the most ornamented of all the remaining gates.

The gate was built during 1659–1661 by designs of the architect Bartolomeo Provaglia. The interior portal has a scenic Baroque facade, while the external portal accentuates the defensive military role of a gate. The road from here led to Ferrara.

In 1330–1333, the Cardinal Bertrand du Pouget ordered construction of a castle near this gate as part of a siege. By the twentieth-century the walls were torn down, and the gate isolated. Restorations were pursued in 1926 and in 2001–2003.

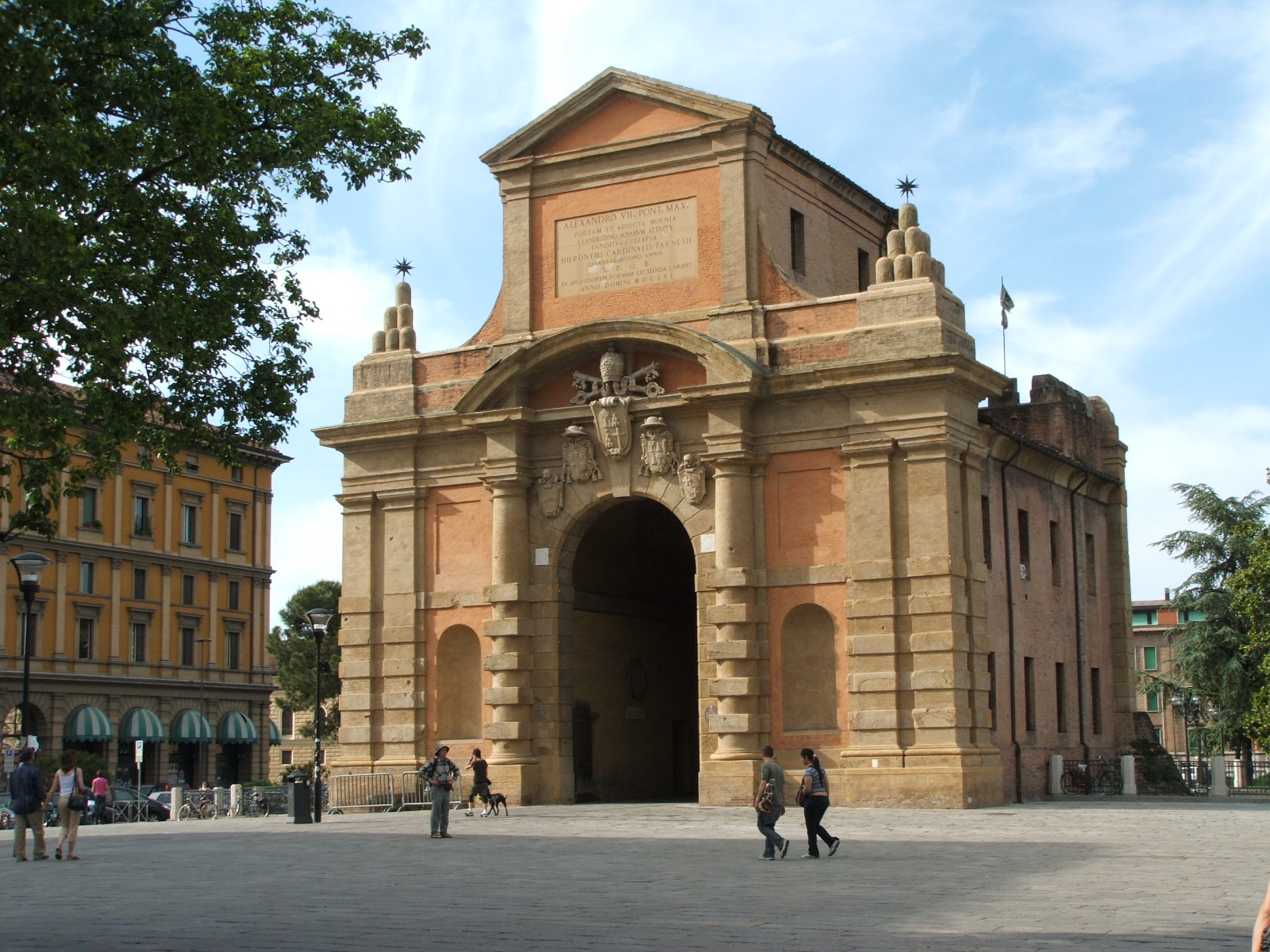
Porta Galliera

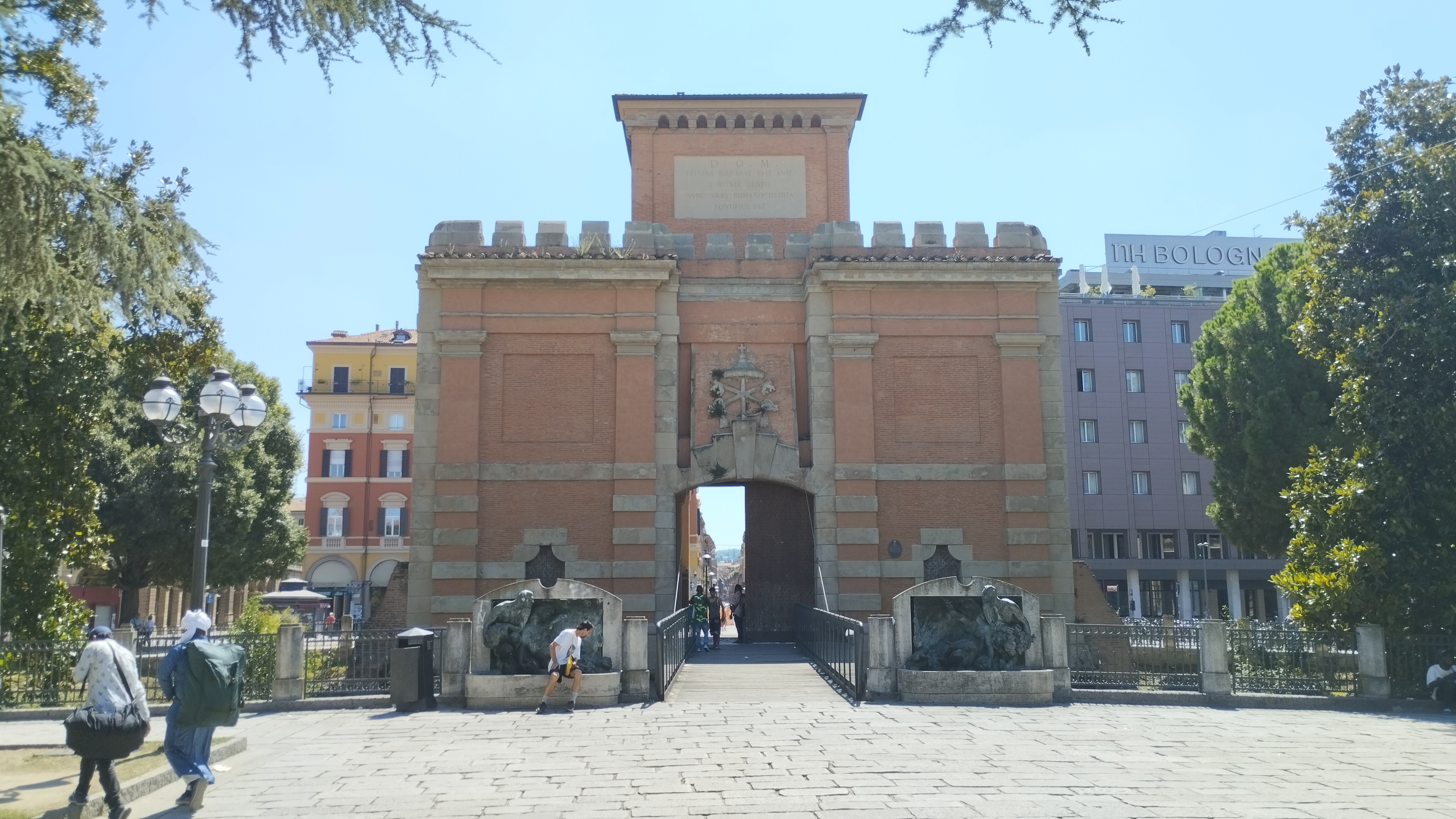
A northern view of the gate
