= Bartolino da Novara =

Italian military architect

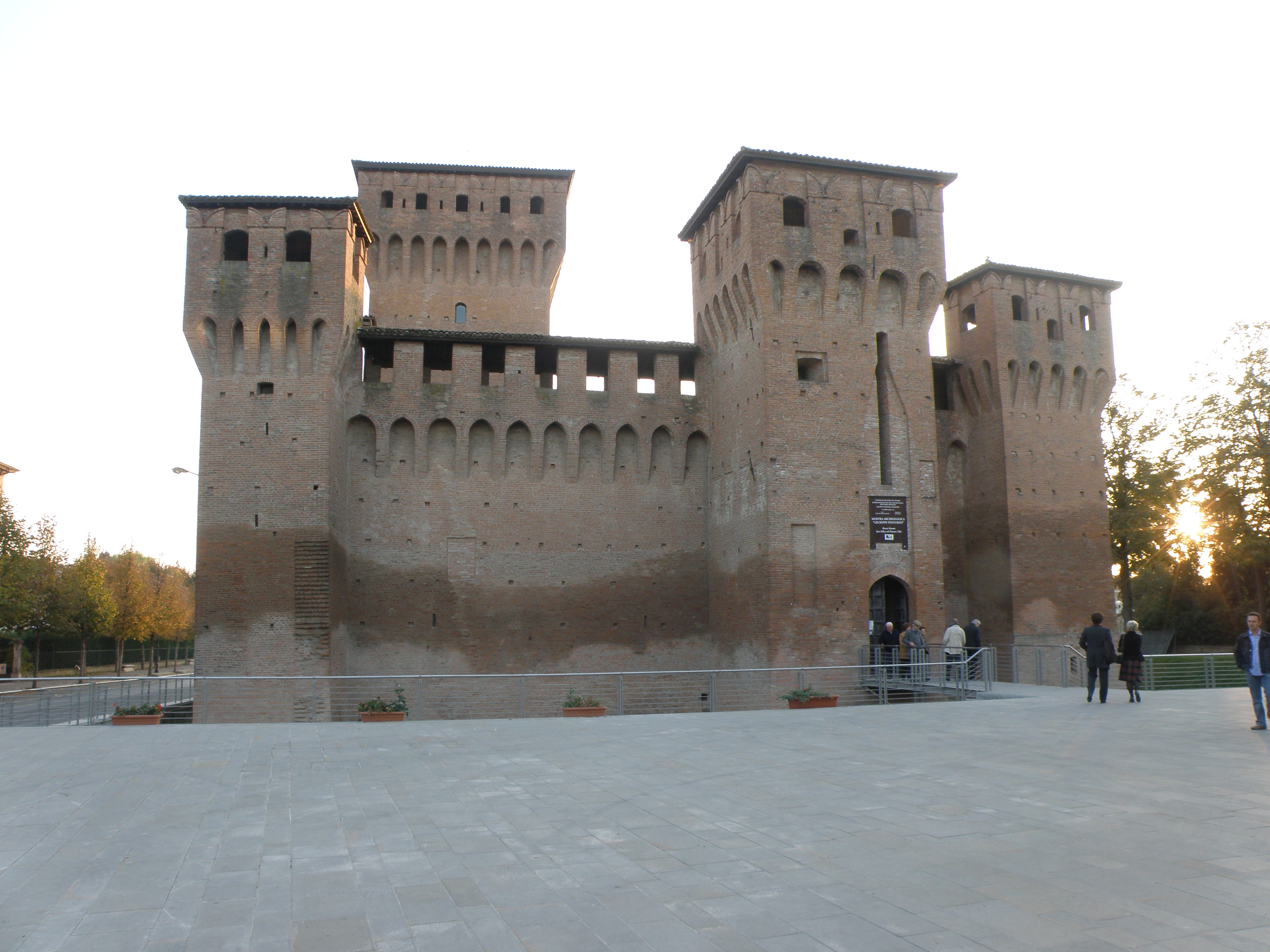
Novara worked on the Rocca Estense of San Felice sul Panaro.

Bartolino (Bertolino) Ploti da Novara (died 1406–1410) was an Italian military architect and engineer.

He was in the service of the Este that in the city of Ferrara in 1376 presented him with a palace in which he lived also his descendant Domenico Maria Novara teacher of Copernicus and in 1385 for those gentlemen designed the Estense Castle.

In 1395 he was at the court of Francesco Gonzaga. For the Lord of Mantua, at the beginning of the fifteenth century, he made major architectural and urban interventions in the area of the court and of the bishopric, which were demolished some old churches such as Santa Maria and Santa Croce in Capodibove to make way for the building of the castle Gonzaga. He was also commissioned by Francis to build the Shrine of Our Lady of Grace.

In 1402 began the construction of the fortress of Finale Emilia, which was enlarged in 1425 to a design by Giovanni da Siena for Niccolò III d'Este.

In 1404 he was responsible for the construction of defensive bastions along the Po.

As a military engineer, he had assignments by the Visconti of Milan and the Lordship De 'Medici of Florence.

== References and sources ==
Sources

- Dizionario biografico degli italiani, VI, Roma, Istituto dell'Enciclopedia italiana, 1964.
- Colombi, Carlo. (1889) Bollettino storico della Svizzera italiana.
