= Bernardino Ferrari =

Italian painter (1495–1574)

Bernardino Ferrari (1495–1524) was an Italian painter of the 16th century. Born in Milan, he flourished in Vigevano, Italy, from 1514 to 1524 where many of his more well known works were produced, the best of which are located in the Vigevano Cathedral.
