= San Carlo, Vigevano =

Coordinates: 45.3165°N 8.8544°E

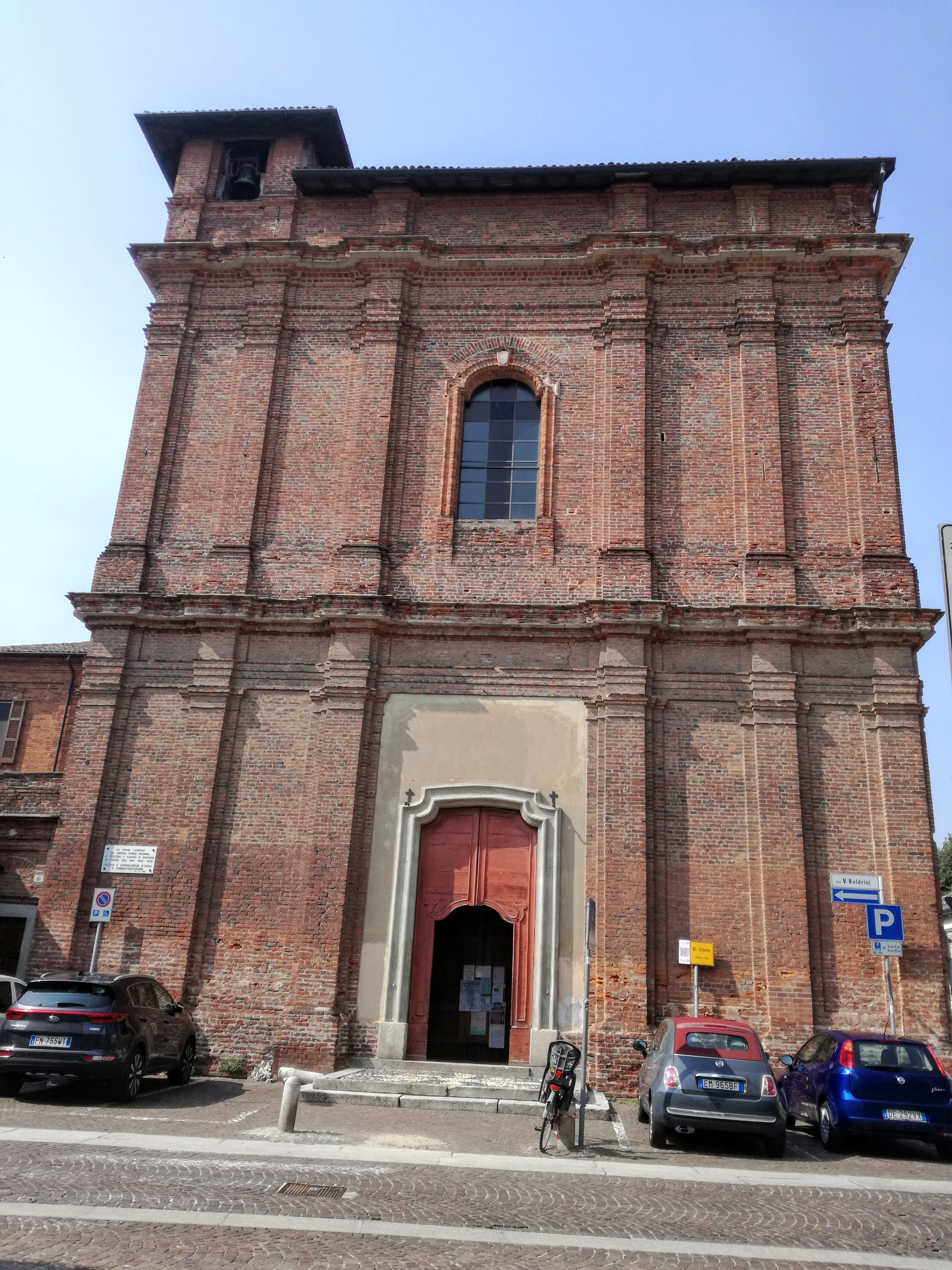
The church.

The church of San Carlo is a religious building located in Vigevano, in province of Pavia and diocese of Vigevano, Italy.

== Description and story ==
The church was built to celebrate the first centenary of the canonization of Saint Charles Borromeo. On 15 May 1710 the Congregation of Saint Charles was founded, approved by the archbishop Giuseppe Archinto in the same year, who had the construction of the church begin in 1724, finishing it in 1736. The congregation officiated in the church of San Rocco until 3 November 1721, and then moved to the Madonna della Neve, where it remained until the consecration of the aforementioned church from which it took its first name. In 1741 the church was visited by Bishop Bossi. In 1802 it was suppressed by Napoleon Bonaparte and transformed into a military hospital; in this period all the works of art were stolen, including the wooden choir. It was reconsecrated and reopened for worship in 1841. In 1850 it was repainted and restored by Giovan Battista Garberini, who completed the work in 1893.

It has dimensions of 26 m long, 9 m wide and 15 m high. The style is purely neoclassical. The facade is simple and is divided into three parts by columns; it has a small bell tower, left unfinished, of the two originally planned, which should have risen from the facade.

It has a single nave and four altars, dedicated respectively to: Saint Louis Gonzaga; Saint Francis Xavier, Saint Francis de Sales and Saint Philip Neri; the Crucifix; the Nativity. The flooring dates back to 1724, in terracotta. Many of the paintings present belong to the church of San Pietro Martire.
