= Madonna della Santa Casa di Loreto =

Catholic church in Pavia province, Italy

Coordinates: 45°19′38.9″N 8°50′56.3″E

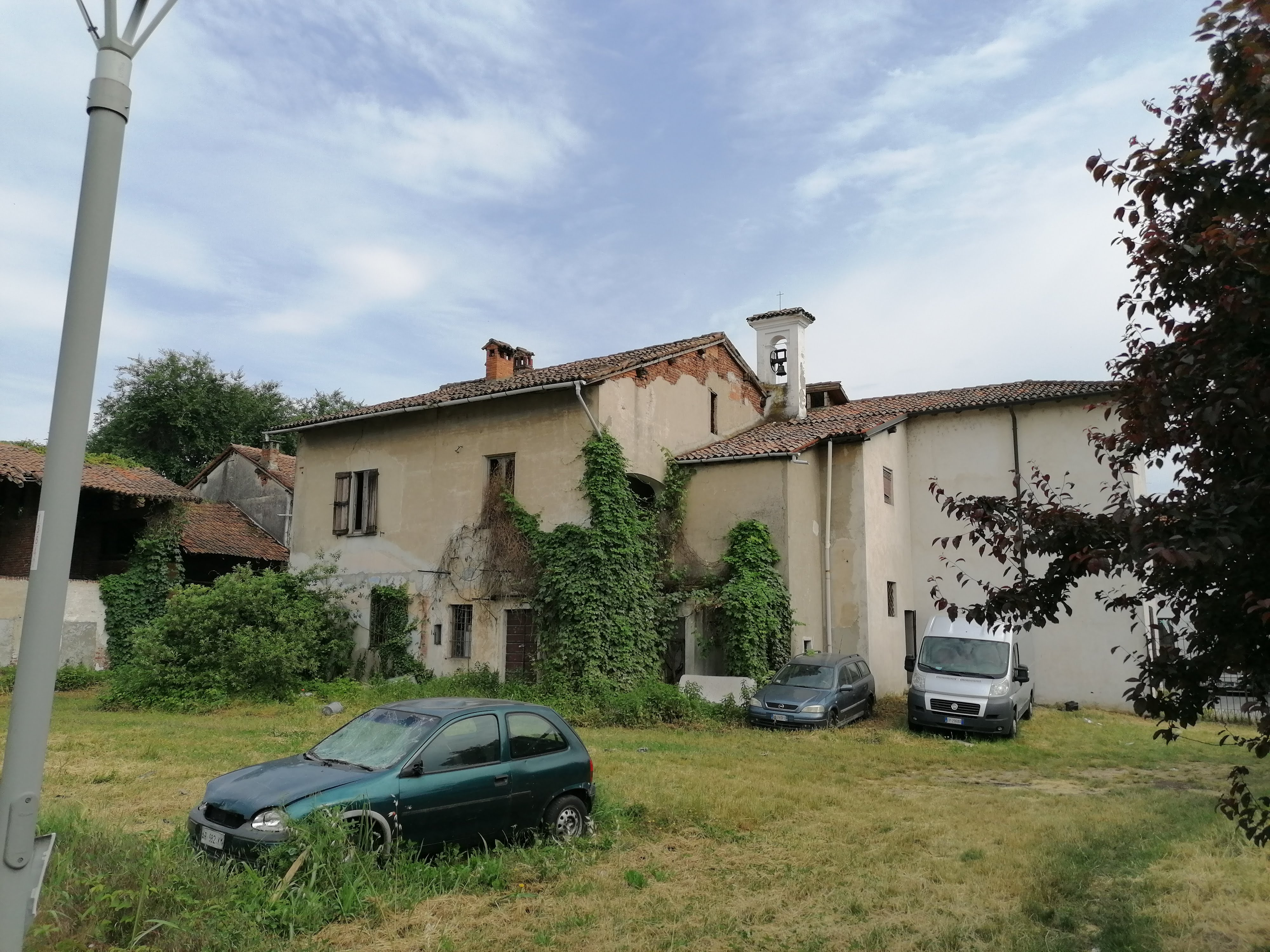
The church.

The church of Madonna della Santa Casa di Loreto is a religious building located in Vigevano, Pavia and is also part of the diocese of Vigevano.

== History ==
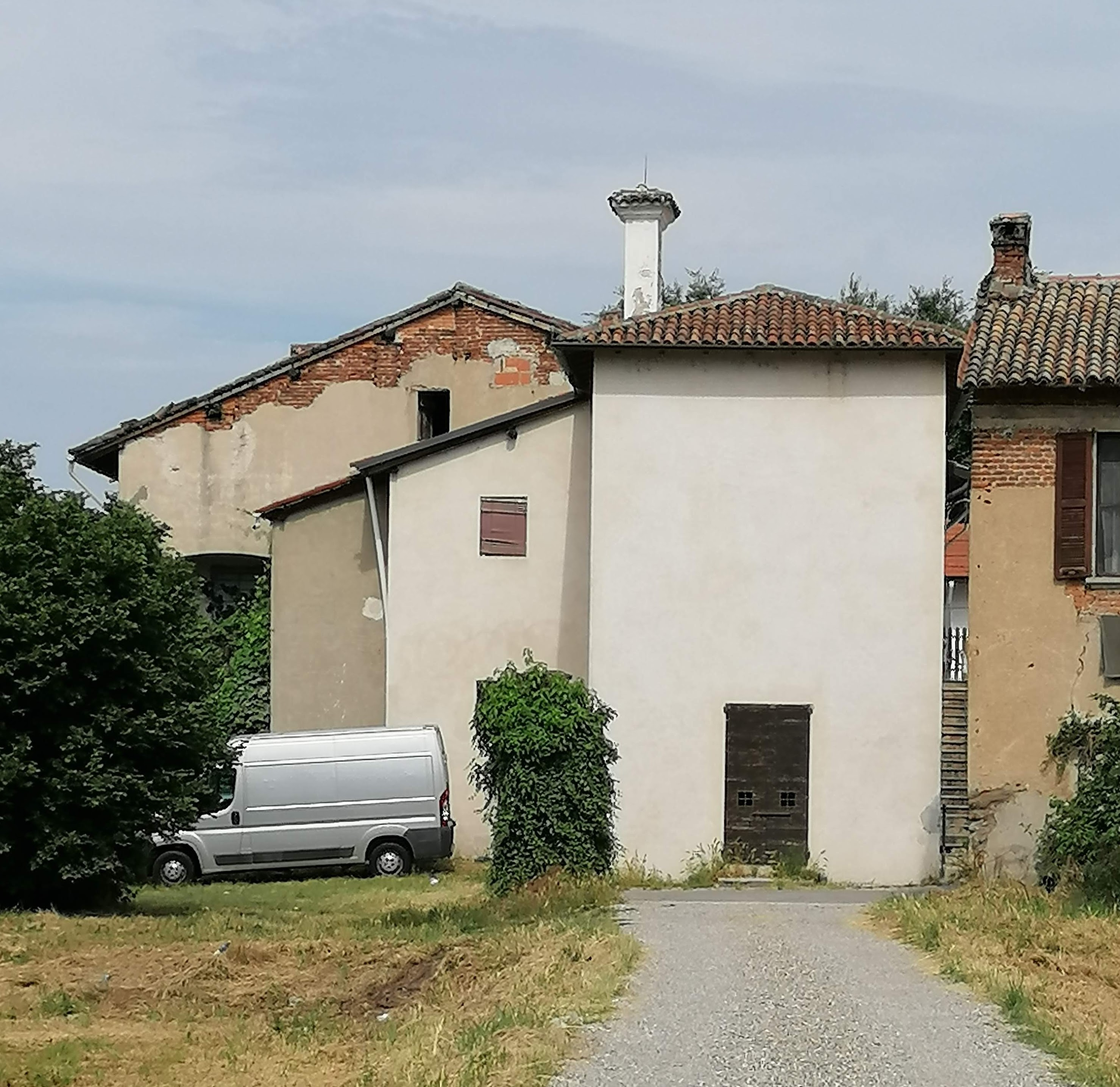
The church in front

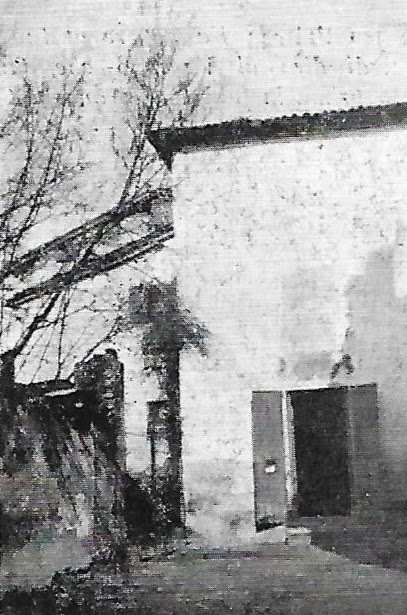
The church in 1930

The Church was built during the plague of 1524. It is smaller than San Cristoforo, built in the same period.

It was built at the behest of a certain friar Domenico, belonging to the order of friars minor, who claimed to have seen the Virgin, who would have asked to build a church to stop the epidemic. Around the church, dedicated to the Madonna of Loreto, a convent was built in 1539, entrusted to the Capuchin friars. After having enlarged and remodeled it in 1553 and 1568, in 1603 the Capuchin friars moved to the church of Cristo della Resega, leaving the building in the hands of the third Franciscan order.

Given the slow degradation of the church, Monsignor Pietro Giorgio Odescalchi, bishop of Vigevano, decided to build the current one. The first stone, a brick from the room in which Saint Charles Borromeo was born, was blessed by him on 3 May 1613 and was placed by Philip of Austria. The altar was built by the bishop himself in those years. The first mass was sung by the bishop on 8 September 1619, after the altar was brought from the bishopric to the new church in a great procession. In Milan a statue of the Madonna of Loreto was built with dimensions similar to the original one and was carried in triumph to Vigevano. Behind the altar the heart of Bishop Odescalchi was buried.

The convent was abandoned in 1653 following a papal bull from Pope Innocent X. After management by the Vigevano Seminary, the building was definitively suppressed by Napoleon in 1805. Since then the church has suffered a slow decline, despite some rescue attempts in the 1930s.

Today it is privately owned. It is located on the corner of Via Ippocrate and Strada Camina.
