= Cristo della Resega =

Church in Vigevano, Italy

Coordinates: 45°18′47″N 8°51′20″E

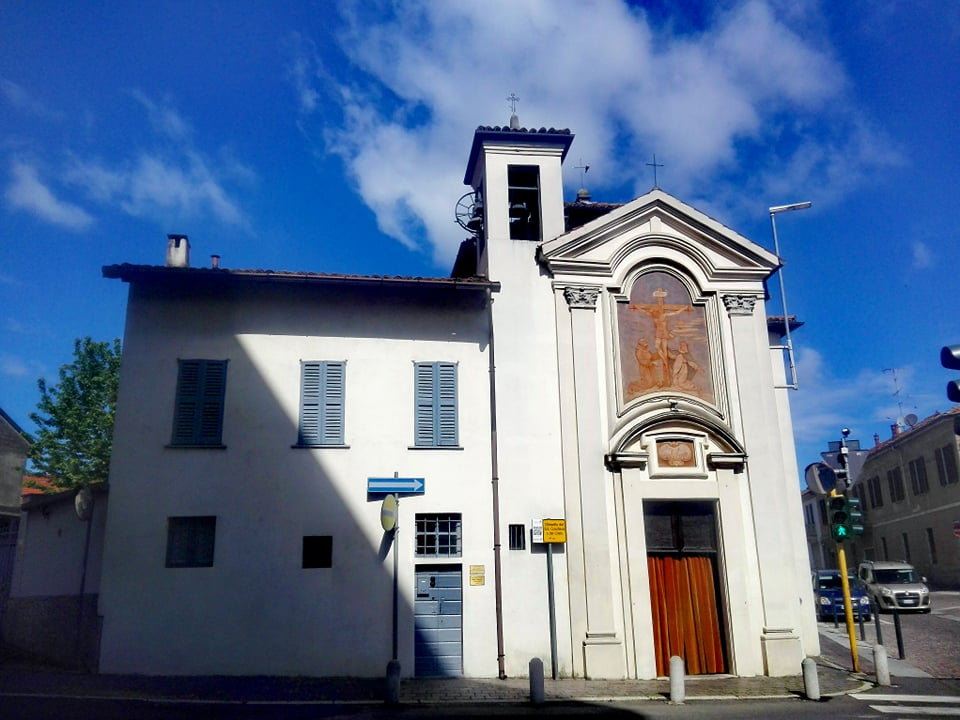
The church.

The Church of the Santissimo Crocifisso or Church of Cristo della Resega is a religious building located in Vigevano, in province of Pavia and diocese of Vigevano.

== Description and history ==
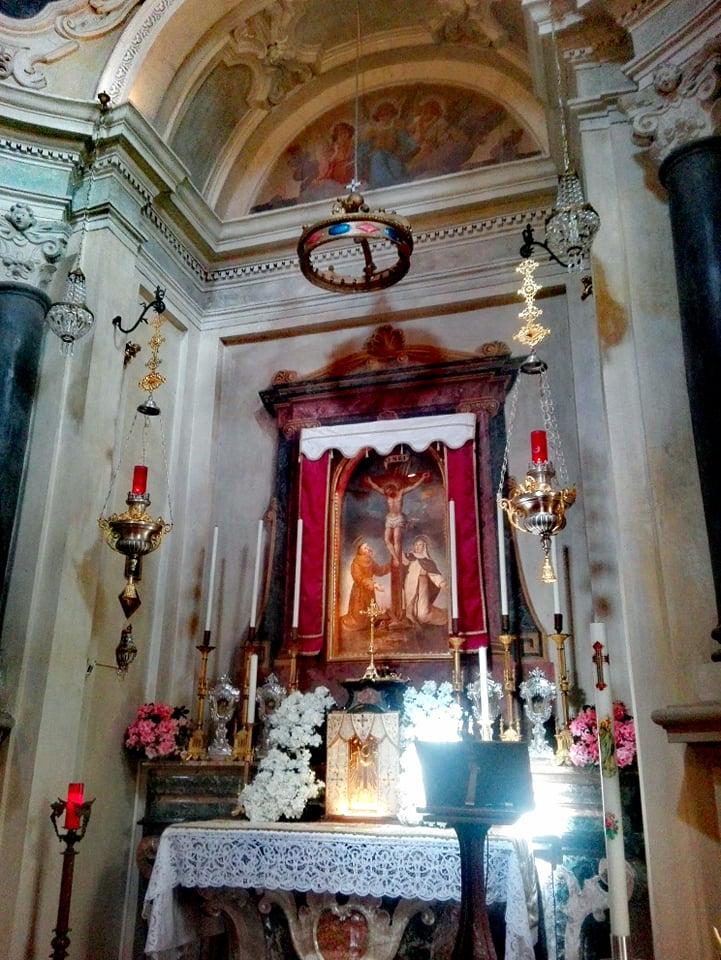
The altar.

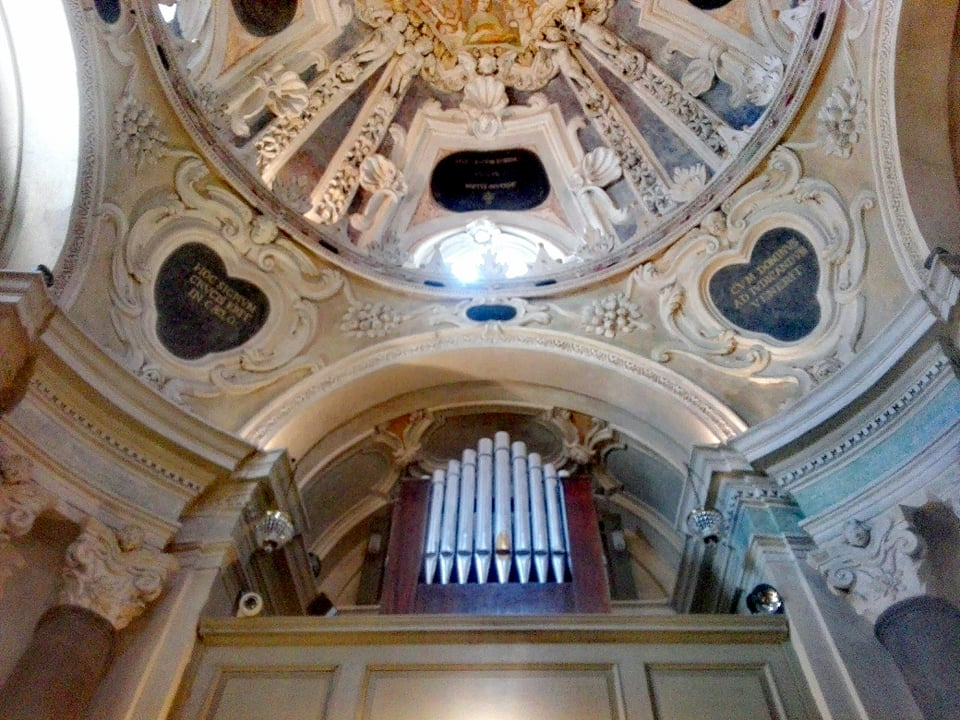
The pipe organ.

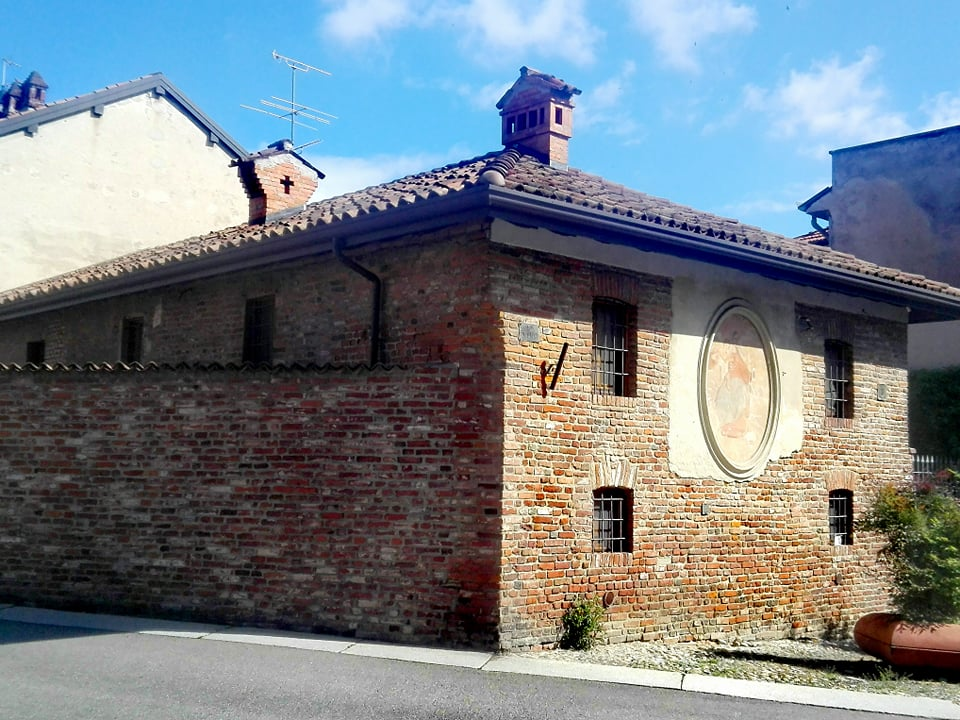
The Resega mill, from which the church takes its name.

The origins of the church can be found in the fresco currently preserved above the altar, by an unknown author. It depicts Christ crucified between Saint Francis of Assisi and Saint Catherine of Siena; in the background, you can see the Vigevano skyline. Popular legend considers this painting to be miraculous because, although it has never been restored, it still retains colors as vivid as originally. This fresco probably belonged to an aedicule against the wall of an ancient palace. Popular devotion to the painting grew steadily, until a chapel was built in 1652.

In 1679, the chapel became an oratory and was sold to the protempore parish priest of the Parish of San Cristoforo. It was precisely because it became private property that it was not demolished during the Napoleonic suppressions, which instead happened to many other churches in Vigevano.

Already considered for decades too small to accommodate all the faithful, in 1749 it was decided to expand and enrich it, starting the works that lasted until 1763, with the Baroque style construction visible today. In 1806 the parish was evicted from the church of San Cristoforo and later transferred to San Pietro Martire. Despite this, Christ's church continued to remain open. The construction of the annexed rooms took place in 1818; these were inhabited by a hermit until the mid-twentieth century. After the demolition of the church of San Cristoforo by Napoleon, the baroque altar and one of the three bells reached the church of Christ from it. The latter, dated 1690 and dedicated to the Holy Trinity, is still functioning and is the middle bell of the small three-bell concert present on the bell tower on the side of the facade. It is the oldest bell in the city after the cleft bell of the Bramante Tower.

Left to slow abandonment starting in 1960, the church underwent restoration by the FAI between 1992 and 1995. During this restoration, the red columns were repainted black, as that would have been the original color. Subsequently, the annexed rooms and the garden were also restored by local associations.

The paired columns and the folders bearing inscriptions on the Passion are black. Lime painted with pointed motifs forms a crown of thorns, from which the hemispherical volume of the dome detaches. The latter is decorated with little angels in relief, white on blue backgrounds, and, at the top, by a frescoed angelic concert.

The building has a significant height due to the impossibility of opening windows on the walls, which required the inclusion of a very large lantern. The entrance front is marked by two giant-order pilasters surmounted by a triangular tympanum; To support the octagonal tiled roof there are short pillars resting on the perimeter walls, which leave the volume of the dome free and visible. The marble altar, from the eighteenth century like the sacristy, demonstrates the continuity of use of the oratory.
