= Camilla Rodolfi =

Italian military commander

- Occupation: Mercenary soldier
- Years active: fl. 1449

Camilla Rodolfi (fl. 1449) was the commander of a group of women who came together to fight against Francesco Sforza.

== Biography ==
Rodolfi was a member of the highly regarded Rodolfi merchant family, which was one of the principal governing families of Vigevano in northern Italy and she was a mercenary soldier. Her dates of birth and death are unknown, but it is known that she was most influential in Italy in 1449.

When Francesco Sforza tried to take Vigevano in April 1449, Rodolfi and a group of women fought back after many men had died trying. Despite the women's attempt, Sforza still captured the city, but some sources suggest that sometimes he liked to have Camilla Rodolfi and her army parade around in full uniform.
