= Pozzo Ardizzi =

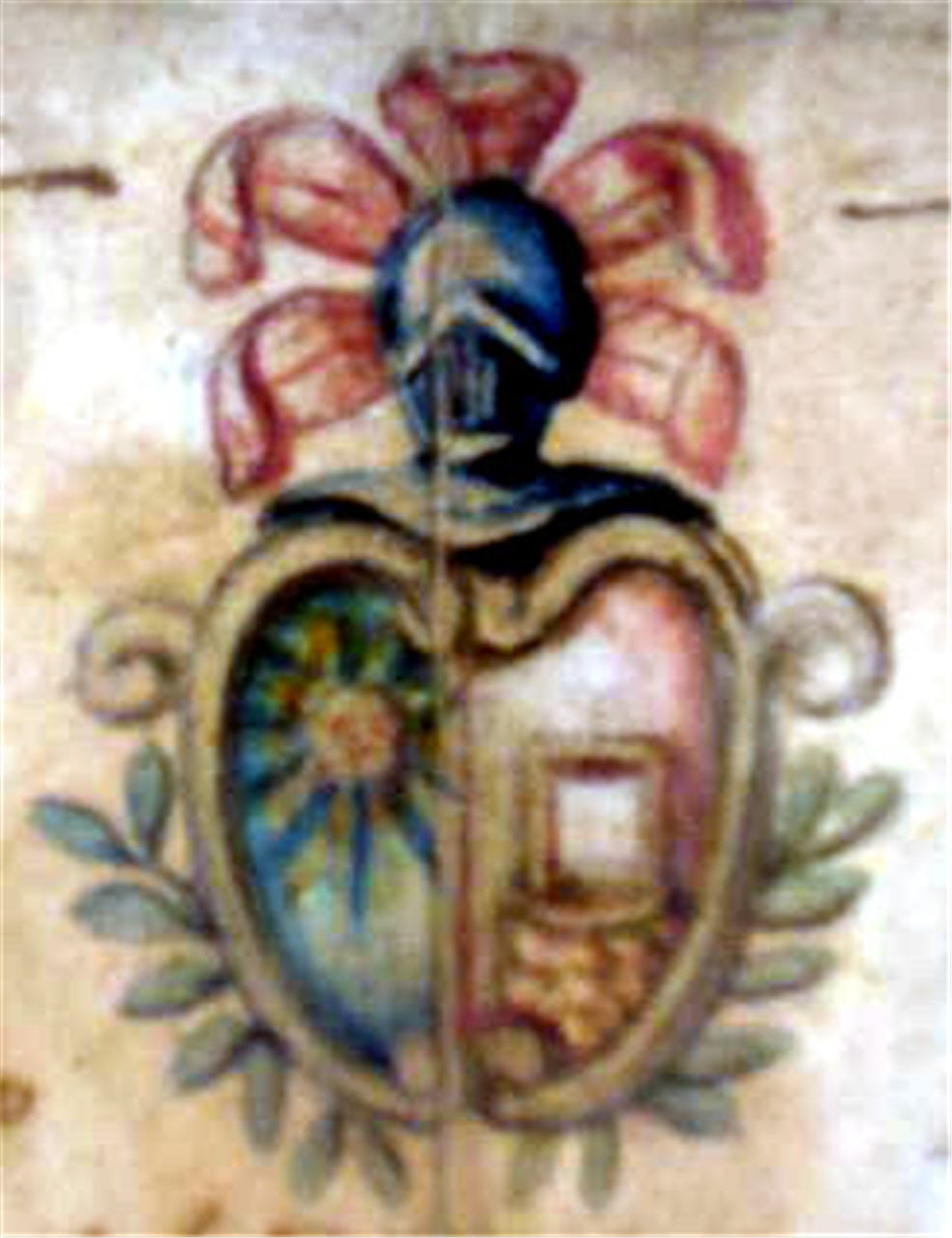
Coat of arms Pozzo Ardizzi

Pozzo Ardizzi surname comes from the city of Vigevano province of Pavia, Italy, which was formed around the middle of the fifteenth century from a branch of the family that is separated from the noble surname Ardizzi.

== History ==
Wealthy landowners, woods and fabrics and wool merchants were settled outside the city in the Valley district, facing the path of Pavia, at the foot of the terrace of the Ticino river, parallel to the coast of the municipality. Unfortunately still unknown how and why the surname originated compound Pozzo Ardizzi, the more relevant hypothesis is that this change was due to reasons of nobility (for example, political situations or union between families).

Its first member was Antonio Pozzo Ardizzi, a descendant of Francesco Ardizzi (d. Vigevano in the year 1399). Antonio, along with his son Cardinal Abramo Ardizzi (also referred to as the Abraam Pozo-Ardicio), bishop of Senigallia, founded in Vigevano, among 1421 and 1424, a church in San Martino valuation under the title Assunzione Beatissima della Vergine Maria, e di S. Jeronimo Dottor della Santa Chiesa, e di S. Maria Maddalena. For this action, obtained from Pope Eugene IV plenary indulgence of three years imprisonment and a period of quarantine for the feast of "Madonna della Assunzione" and the feast of "Santo Ieronimo": Traditiio possessionis ac litentia concessa etc.

On the altar wall of the chapel, on the right hand, it could read the inscription:

D. O. M

Reliq. sanc. cruc. Domini nostri Jesu Cristi, et Sanctorum Lazzari,

Maximini, Paulini, M. Magdalenae, B. Rosae, et ex lapidibus locorum

ascensionis Dominicae, montis Calvarii, assumptionis, et sepulcri B. M.

V. per nob. Abraham Ardicium S.R.E. cardinalem ex civitate Segnogalia,

cujus fuit Episcopus, Viglevanum patriam suam allatis.

Anno CIɔCCCCXL

Antonius Ardicius abnepos.

P, P.

Anno CIɔIɔCVI Ibidus Junii

The church was destroyed in 1800 and one of his relics donated by Abramo, was transferred to the church of S. Francesco, in Vigevano.

Abramo Ardizzi played an important role as a diplomat in the peace achieved on June 6, 1449 between Vigevano and Count Francesco Sforza. Following the agreement, Vigevano accepted Francesco Sforza as Lord prompting the entry of an armed contingent, the cancellation of the right to loot and put the city under the protection of The Duchess Bianca Maria Visconti (wife and daughter of the Duke Francesco Filippo Maria Visconti, ruler of Milan). Abramo was governor of Alessandria, ambassador of the Duke Filippo before the king of France, Carlos VII and King Naples Renato, Duke of Anjou (Anji), Count of Provence. In 1455 he was mayor of Vigevano. He obtained from Filippo the castle and the land of Colonnella in Abruzzo, with the title of Count, in return for services in the embassies.

== Poemetto Latino ==
Excerpt from the poem De originibus Viglaevanensis populi (Initia et populi nostri Viglevanensis origins) about the origin of the city of Vigevano, written by the "father Dominican" Agostino della Porta (Della-Porta) on July 22, 1490, which refers to the, Ardizzi family:

Ardiciique superba domus, cui desuper uni

Exhibitum est, inter nostrorum nomina patrum,

Stulta pati, sapiensque mori, et male vivere semper,

Praeque aliis efferre suos: hinc edita ferturx

== Family tree ==
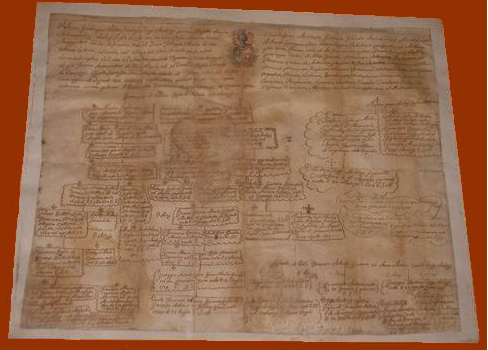
Pozzo Ardizzi's family tree

Still continues the family tradition of transferring firstborn son to firstborn son a picture with the Pozzo Ardizzi genealogy tree which begins with the description of the sons of Antonio, Luchino and Mateo in the fifteenth century and ends with their descendants in the nineteenth century.

In 2007, Daniel Pozzo Ardizzi put in charged of document recovery to Mario Silvio Goren, restorer of historic and artistic collections and teaching in the field of preventive conservation and restoration.

== Nineteenth, twentieth and twenty-first centuries ==
During the last years of the nineteenth century, some descendants of the name Pozzo Ardizzi migrate from Vigevano to the Argentina, which initially established in the southern province of Buenos Aires in the city of Bahía Blanca: Cesare F. Antonio, Rosa, Catterina, Luigi and Giovanni Battista. Giovanni died in 1916 and his wife, along with his three children born in Argentina (two males and one female) back to Italy. The other brothers will remain in South America. If we stand in the twenty-first century, as many descendants with the surname Pozzo Ardizzi is located in the Argentina, with small families distributed in Italy and Brazil.

== The writer ==
Luigi Pozzo Ardizzi marries Lucia Fantino and had three children, one of whom will be Luis Hipólito Antonio Pozzo Ardizzi (08/13/1901 - December 1965). Teacher, writer and journalist, played a significant role in the Argentine radio drama during the 1940 and 1950. His contribution to the genre was with the creation of various works and in the direction of radio companies. He also wrote in the newspaper La Razón, La Prensa, the editorial Atlantida and the Caras y Caretas magazine. Published humorous stories, novels and poetry.

== La Pichona ==
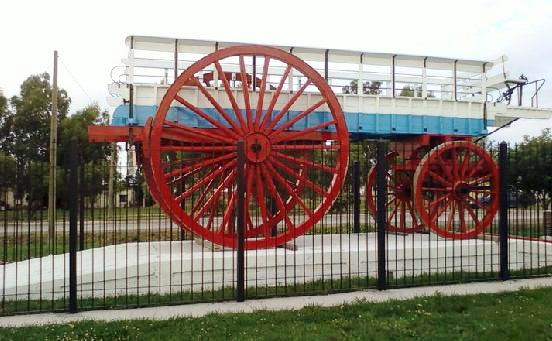
Cart "La Pichona"

A son of Cesare F. Antonio Pozzo Ardizzi, César Juan Bautista, bought in 1909 in the city of Tandil, at 17 years of age, a cart called "La Pichona". The vehicle was about 6 meters long by 1.30 wide, plus two rear wheels of 3.26 meters in diameter and 1600 kilos Lapacho wood built with 22 spokes.

"La Pichona" was drawn by 16 horses, all solid blacks, who were called by their names. Using a five-foot whip and drawing circles in the air, without touching the animals, the wagon was mobilized for 80 km to transport wool and grain from the city of Carmen de Patagones to Stroeder (which end of the rail was until 1922, in the railway corridor coming from the city of Bahía Blanca) where the route was normally 5 days and complications of time could be extended to 20 days. After returning to Patagones products from Buenos Aires. "La Pichona" was the last major-drawn transport and the location of the tracks until Patagones in 1922, the Pozzo Ardizzi family reduced communicating their actions near the sites that were not served by rail.

In the 50 was abandoned in a field (Cañada Honda), and in 1969 the Pozzo Ardizzi family the donation to the Historical Museum Francisco de Viedma. By Mrs. Emma Nozzi director proceeds to his rescue and exhibition as a historical and patrimonial vehicle in front "7 de Marzo" square. However, in this area was built a Civic Center thus shoved to "La Pichona" in the then Club Hípico Fuerte del Carmen, exposed to damage, vandalism and inclement weather. After several political efforts to rescue the cart had not proven, in 2009 the Pozzo Ardizzi family decided directly retrieve "La Pichona " and Alberto Pozzo Ardizzi requested for the restoration to the blacksmith Luis Facio.

Upon completion of the work that required 8 months of arduous and meticulous work, "La Pichona", possibly one of the few vehicles of similar characteristics that are still in Argentina, was deposited in a square on January 8, 2011, between Bernal and Hipólito Yrigoyen streets of the city of Carmen de Patagones province of Buenos Aires.

== References (surname documents) ==
- Ardici
1. Sacchetti, Egidio (1649). Vigevano Illustrato. Italy: G. P. E. Ramellati.
- Ardicii
1. Sacchetti, Egidio (1649). Vigevano Illustrato. Italy: G. P. E. Ramellati.
2. Società storica lombarda (1905). Serie Quarta. Archivio Storico Lombardo. Vol. III. (Alessandro Colombo. "L'ingresso di Francesco Sforza in Milano e l'inizio di un novo prinzipato") - (Felice Fossati. "La plebe vigevanese alla conquista dei potere pubblici nel 1536". Italy: Società storica lombarda.
3. Il Rosario, Volume 21 (1904). Italy.
4. Andenna, Giancarlo (1992). Metamorfosi di un borgo: Vigevano in etā visconteo-sforzesca : [atti del Convegno di Studi "Vigevano in etā visconteo-sforzesca" (Vigevano 30 settembre-1 ottobre 1988)]. Italy: Franco Angeli.
- Ardiciique
1. Della Porta, Agostino (1490). De originibus populi viglevanensis (Initia et origines nostri populi Viglevanensis). Italy.
2. Sacchetti, Egidio (1649). Vigevano Illustrato. Italy: G. P. E. Ramellati.
3. Giorgio, Pietro; Bucella, Biffignandi (1810). Memorie Istoriche della Città e Contado di Vigevano. Italy: dalla tipografia di Vigevano.
4. Della Regia Deputazione di Storia Patria (1892). Miscellanea di storia Italyna, Volumen 29. Italy: Della Regia Deputazione di Storia Patria.
5. Società storica lombarda (1905). Serie Quarta. Archivio Storico Lombardo. Vol. III. (Alessandro Colombo. "L'ingresso di Francesco Sforza in Milano e l'inizio di un novo prinzipato") - (Felice Fossati. "La plebe vigevanese alla conquista dei potere pubblici nel 1536". Italy: Società storica lombarda.
- Ardiciis
1. Giordano, Luisa; Tardito, Rosalba (2000). Piazza ducale e i suoi restauri: Cinquecento anni di storia. Italy: Edizione Ets.
2. Menochio, Giacomo (1586). Consiliorum siue Responsorum D. Iacobi Menochii ... liber quartus ... cum rerum summis, & indice locupletissimo, omnia nunc demùm accuratissimè recognita & à mille mendis ... Expurgata. Italy.
3. Commission des missions scientifiques et littéraires (1882). Archives des Missions Scientifiques et Littéraires. 3eme Série, Volúmenes 8-9. France: Imprimerie nationale.
4. Andenna, Giancarlo (1992). Metamorfosi di un borgo: Vigevano in etā visconteo-sforzesca : [atti del Convegno di Studi "Vigevano in etā visconteo-sforzesca" (Vigevano 30 settembre-1 ottobre 1988)]. Italy: Franco Angeli.
5. Della Regia Deputazione di Storia Patria. (1892). Miscellanea di Storia Italyna. Tomo XXIX. Italy.: Fratelli Boca Librai di S. M.
6. Pontieri, Ernesto (1978). Carteggi diplomatici fra Milano Sforzesca e la France, Volumen 1. Italy: Instituto Storico Italyno per l Eā Moderna e contemporanea.
7. Società pavese di storia patria (1911). Bollettino, Volúmenes 11-13. Italy: Società pavese di storia patria.
8. Toscani, Xenio (1969). Aspetti di vita religiosa a Pavia nel secolo XV.: In appendice: Atti della visita pastorale di Amicus de Fossulanis alla città e diocesi nel 1460. Italy: A. Giuffrè.
9. Sottili, Agostino (1994). Documenti per la storia dell'universitā di Pavia nella seconda metā del'400: (1450-1455). Italy: Cisalpino-Goliardica.
- Ardicij
1. Sacchetti, Egidio (1649). Vigevano Illustrato. Italy: G. P. E. Ramellati.
- Ardicio
1. Sacchetti, Egidio (1649). Vigevano Illustrato. Italy: G. P. E. Ramellati.
2. Cotta, Lazaro Agostino (1701). Museo novarese. Italy: per gli heredi Ghisolfi.
3. Giornale arcadico di scienze, lettere ed arti (1843). Volumen 95. Italy: Tipografia delle belle arti.
- Ardicio del Pozzo
1. Sacchetti, Egidio (1649). Vigevano Illustrato. Italy: G. P. E. Ramellati.
- Ardicium
1. Cotta, Lazaro Agostino (1701). Museo novarese. Italy: per gli heredi Ghisolfi.
2. Giorgio, Pietro; Bucella, Biffignandi (1870). Memorie Istoriche della Città e Contado di Vigevano opera postuma di Pietro Giorgio Biffignandi Buccella. Italy: Tip. editrice E. Spargella.
3. Sottili, Agostino (1994). Documenti per la storia dell'universitā di Pavia nella seconda metā del'400: (1450-1455). Italy: Cisalpino-Goliardica.
- Ardicius
1. Muratori, Lodovico Antonio (1732). Rerum Italicarum scriptores: ab anno aerae christianae quingentesimo ad millesimumquingentesimum. Italy: Typographia Societatis Palatinae.
2. Giorgio, Pietro; Bucella, Biffignandi (1870). Memorie Istoriche della Città e Contado di Vigevano opera postuma di Pietro Giorgio Biffignandi Buccella. Italy: Tip. editrice E. Spargella.
3. Universität Wien. Institut für Österreichische Geschichtsforschung (1889). Mittheilungen des Instituts für Oesterreichische Geschichtsforschung, Volumen 10, Número 4. Germany: Wagner'sche Universitätsbuchhandlung.
4. Buster, B (1879). Die Beziehungen der Mediceer zu Frankreich: während der Jahre 1434-1490, in ihrem Zusammenhang mit den allgemeinen Verhältnissen Italiens. Germany: Italiens. Germany:Duncker & Humblot.
- Ardicivm
1. Bellazzi, Don Pietro (1964). La chiesa di S. Francesco in Vigevano. Vigevano. Italy: Crespi.
2. Brambilla, Carlo Stefano (1669). La chiesa di Vigevano. Italy: Camagni.
- Ardicivs
1. Bellazzi, Don Pietro (1964). La chiesa di S. Francesco in Vigevano. Vigevano. Italy: Crespi.
2. Brambilla, Carlo Stefano (1669). La chiesa di Vigevano. Italy: Camagni.
- Arditia
1. Dal Pozzo, Simone (1550). Libro d'Estimo generale della città di Vigevano e suo territorio con cronache e notizie stor. ed elenco delle materie in esso contenute 1550. Italy.
2. Muggiati, Pier Luigi, Ramella, Carlo (2003). Historia de l'inclita citta de Vigevano. La storia di Vigevano nelle Cronache del cancelliere Simone del Pozzo. Italy: Arké Edizioni Società Storica Vigevanese.
- Arditiis
1. Giorgio, Pietro; Bucella, Biffignandi (1810). Memorie Istoriche della Città e Contado di Vigevano. Italy: dalla tipografia di Vigevano.
2. Società storica lombarda (1894). Archivio storico lombardo. Italy: Società storica lombarda.
3. Società di storia, arte, e archeologia per le provincie di Alessandria e Asti (1907). Rivista di storia, arte, archeologia per le province di Alessandria e Asti. Italy: Società di storia, arte, e archeologia per le provincie di Alessandria e Asti.
4. Della Regia Deputazione di Storia Patria (1892). Miscellanea di storia Italyna, Volumen 29. Italy: Della Regia Deputazione di Storia Patria.
- Arditij
1. Dal Pozzo, Simone (1550). Libro d'Estimo generale della città di Vigevano e suo territorio con cronache e notizie stor. ed elenco delle materie in esso contenute 1550. Italy.
2. Muggiati, Pier Luigi, Ramella, Carlo (2003). Historia de l'inclita citta de Vigevano. La storia di Vigevano nelle Cronache del cancelliere Simone del Pozzo. Italy: Arké Edizioni Società Storica Vigevanese.
- Arditij Pozzi
- arditio
1. Osio, Luigi (1872). Documenti diplomatici tratti dagli Archivj Milanesi e coordinati per cura di Luigi Osio, Volumen 3. Italy: Bernardoni.
- Arditio de Puteo
1. Dal Pozzo, Simone (1550). Libro d'Estimo generale della città di Vigevano e suo territorio con cronache e notizie stor. ed elenco delle materie in esso contenute 1550. Italy.
2. Muggiati, Pier Luigi, Ramella, Carlo (2003). Historia de l'inclita citta de Vigevano. La storia di Vigevano nelle Cronache del cancelliere Simone del Pozzo. Italy: Arké Edizioni Società Storica Vigevanese.
- arditio et Pozo
1. Dal Pozzo, Simone (1550). Libro d'Estimo generale della città di Vigevano e suo territorio con cronache e notizie stor. ed elenco delle materie in esso contenute 1550. Italy.
2. Muggiati, Pier Luigi, Ramella, Carlo (2003). Historia de l'inclita citta de Vigevano. La storia di Vigevano nelle Cronache del cancelliere Simone del Pozzo. Italy: Arké Edizioni Società Storica Vigevanese.
- Arditiosque
1. Giorgio, Pietro; Bucella, Biffignandi (1810). Memorie Istoriche della Città e Contado di Vigevano. Italy: dalla tipografia di Vigevano.
2. Muratori, Lodovico Antonio; Carducci, Giosuè; Fiorini, Vittorio; Fedele, Pietro (1900). Rerum italicarum scriptores: raccolta degli storici Italyni dal cinquecento al millecinquecento, Volumen 21, Parte 2. Italy: S. Lapi.
- Ardizi
1. Vieusseux, Gian Pietro (1994). Archivio storico Italyno, Números 559-560. Italy: Leo S. Olschki.
2. Leverotti, Franca (1994). "Governare a modo e stillo de' signori--": osservazioni in margine all'amministrazione della giustizia al tempo di Galeazzo Maria Sforza duca di Milano : 1466-76. Italy: Leo S. Olschki.

* Ardizzi

1. Casalis, Goffredo (1854). Dizionario Geografico Storico-Statistico-Commerciale degli stati di S. M. il Re di Sardegna. Volumen XXV. Italy, Torino: Gaetano Maspero librajo e G. Marzorati tipografo.
2. Bellazzi, Don Pietro (1964). La chiesa di S. Francesco in Vigevano. Vigevano. Italy: Crespi.
3. Perret, Paul Michel (1896). Histoire des relations de la France avec Venise du XIIIe siècle à l'avènement de Charles VIII: du XIIIe [i.e. treizième] siècle à l'avènement de Charles VIII[i.e.huit]. France, Paris: Leipzig: H. Welter.
4. Andenna, Giancarlo (1992). Metamorfosi di un borgo: Vigevano in etā visconteo-sforzesca : [atti del Convegno di Studi "Vigevano in etā visconteo-sforzesca" (Vigevano 30 settembre-1 ottobre 1988)]. Italy: Franco Angeli.
5. Giordano, Luisa; Tardito, Rosalba (2000). Piazza ducale e i suoi restauri: Cinquecento anni di storia. Italy: Edizione Ets.
6. Chittolini, Giorgio (1997). Vigevano e i territori circostanti alla fine del Medioevo. Italy, Pavia: UNICOPLI.
7. Osio, Luigi (1872). Documenti diplomatici tratti dagli Archivj Milanesi e coordinati per cura di Luigi Osio, Volumen 3. Italy: Bernardoni.
8. Commission des missions scientifiques et littéraires (1882). Archives des Missions Scientifiques et Littéraires. 3eme Série, Volúmenes 8-9. France: Imprimerie nationale.
9. Della Regia Deputazione di Storia Patria (1892). Miscellanea di storia Italyna, Volumen 29. Italy: Della Regia Deputazione di Storia Patria.
10. Società storica lombarda (1905). Serie Quarta. Archivio Storico Lombardo. Vol. III. (Alessandro Colombo. "L'ingresso di Francesco Sforza in Milano e l'inizio di un novo prinzipato") - (Felice Fossati. "La plebe vigevanese alla conquista dei potere pubblici nel 1536". Italy: Società storica lombarda.
11. Società storica lombarda (1914). Serie Quinta. Archivio Storico Lombardo. Vol. I. (Felipe Fossati. "Raporti fra una terra e i suoi signori") - (Alessandro Colombo. "Le origeni del comune di Vigevano". Italy: Società storica lombarda.
12. Du Fresne de Beaucourt, Gaston (1888). Histoire de Charles VII, Volumen 4. France: Sté. Bibliograp.
13. Giorgio, Pietro; Bucella, Biffignandi (1870). Memorie Istoriche della Città e Contado di Vigevano opera postuma di Pietro Giorgio Biffignandi Buccella. Italy: Tip. editrice E. Spargella.
14. Società pavese di storia patria (1903). Bollettino della Società pavese di storia patria (Volume 3, Fascicolo 3-4) - Alessandro Colombo - "Vigevano e la Repubblica Ambrosiana nella lotta contro Francesco Sforza (Agosto 1447-Giugno 1449). Italy: Società pavese di storia patria.
15. Osio, Luigi (1872). Documenti diplomatici tratti dagli archivi Milanesi. Italy: tipografia di Giuseppe Bernardoni di Giovanni.
16. Du Fresne de Beaucourt, Gaston (1888). Le Règne de Charles VII, d'après M. Henri Martin et d'après les sources contemporaines. France: Maurice Tardieu.
17. Witte, Heinrich (1907). Regesten der Markgrafen von Baden von 1431(1420) - 1453. Volume 3 of Regesten der Markgrafen von Baden und Hachberg 1050-1515. Germany: Wagner.
18. Du Fresne de Beaucourt, Gaston (1891). Histoire de Charles VII: La fin du règne, 1454-1461. France: Librairie de la Société bibliographique, A. Picard.
19. Dal Pozzo, Simone (1550). Libro d'Estimo generale della città di Vigevano e suo territorio con cronache e notizie stor. ed elenco delle materie in esso contenute 1550. Italy.
20. Muggiati, Pier Luigi, Ramella, Carlo (2003). Historia de l'inclita citta de Vigevano. La storia di Vigevano nelle Cronache del cancelliere Simone del Pozzo. Italy: Arké Edizioni Società Storica Vigevanese.
- Ardizzi Pozzo
1. Dal Pozzo, Simone (1550). Libro d'Estimo generale della città di Vigevano e suo territorio con cronache e notizie stor. ed elenco delle materie in esso contenute 1550. Italy.
2. Muggiati, Pier Luigi, Ramella, Carlo (2003). Historia de l'inclita citta de Vigevano. La storia di Vigevano nelle Cronache del cancelliere Simone del Pozzo. Italy: Arké Edizioni Società Storica Vigevanese.
- Ardizzo
1. Brambilla, Carlo Stefano (1669). La chiesa di Vigevano. Italy: Camagni.
- Ardizzo de Puteo
1. Dal Pozzo, Simone (1550). Libro d'Estimo generale della città di Vigevano e suo territorio con cronache e notizie stor. ed elenco delle materie in esso contenute 1550. Italy.
2. Muggiati, Pier Luigi, Ramella, Carlo (2003). Historia de l'inclita citta de Vigevano. La storia di Vigevano nelle Cronache del cancelliere Simone del Pozzo. Italy: Arké Edizioni Società Storica Vigevanese.
- Dal Pozzo Ardizzi
1. Museo del Risorgimento e raccolte storiche del comune di Milano (1962). Le carte di Agostino Bertani. Italy: Museo del Risorgimento e raccolte storiche del comune di Milan.
- de Ardicii
1. Societa Storica Lombarda (1904). Archivio Storico Lombardo (Serie 4, Volume 1, Fascicolo 1), Alessandro Colombo. Un dono de' vigevanesi a Francesco Sforza (marzo 1450) . Italy, Milano: Fratelli Boca.
2. Società pavese di storia patria (1903). Bollettino della Società pavese di storia patria (Volume 3, Fascicolo 3-4) - Alessandro Colombo - "Vigevano e la Repubblica Ambrosiana nella lotta contro Francesco Sforza (Agosto 1447-Giugno 1449). Italy: Società pavese di storia patria.
3. Società storica lombarda (1939). Archivio storico lombardo, Volume 4. Italy: Società storica lombarda.
4. Della Regia Deputazione di Storia Patria (1892). Miscellanea di storia Italyna, Volumen 29. Italy: Della Regia Deputazione di Storia Patria.
5. Bellazzi, Don Pietro (1964). La chiesa di S. Francesco in Vigevano. Vigevano. Italy: Crespi.
- de Ardiciis
1. Società storica lombarda (1905). Serie Quarta. Archivio Storico Lombardo. Vol. III. (Alessandro Colombo. "L'ingresso di Francesco Sforza in Milano e l'inizio di un novo prinzipato") - (Felice Fossati. "La plebe vigevanese alla conquista dei potere pubblici nel 1536". Italy: Società storica lombarda.
2. Kristeller, Paul Oskar (1997). Iter Italicum. Holland: BRILL.
3. Cicero, Marcus Tullius (1995). Ciceronis, M. Tulli Fascicule 3: De Oratore. Germany: Walter de Gruyter.
4. Sabbadini, Remigio (1914). Storia e critica di testi latini. Estados Unidos: Georg Olms Verlag.
5. Bauer, W.; Friedlein, Gottfried; Kurz, A.; Deuerling, Andreas; Römer, Adolf (1885). Bayerische Blatter fur das Gymnasial-Schulwesen, Volumen 21. Germany: Bayerischer gymnasiallehrerverein, München.
6. Faucon, Maurice (1882). Le mariage de Louis d'Orléans et de Valentine Visconti: la domination française dans le Milanais de 1387 à 1450, rapport de deux missions en Italie, 1879 et 1880. France: Imprimerie nationale.
- de ardicijs / de Ardicijs
1. Societa Storica Lombarda (1904). Archivio Storico Lombardo (Serie 4, Volume 1, Fascicolo 1), Alessandro Colombo. Un dono de' vigevanesi a Francesco Sforza (marzo 1450) . Italy, Milano: Fratelli Boca.
2. Cicero, Marcus Tullius (1885). M. Tulli Ciceronis Ad M. Brutum Orator: A Revised Text. Inglaterra: CUP Archive.
3. Menochio, Giacomo (1609). Consiliorum siue Responsorum D. Iacobi Menochii ...: Liber quartus. Italy.: Pietro Martire Locarno.
4. Società pavese di storia patria (1903). Bollettino della Società pavese di storia patria (Volume 3, Fascicolo 3-4) - Alessandro Colombo - "Vigevano e la Repubblica Ambrosiana nella lotta contro Francesco Sforza (Agosto 1447-Giugno 1449). Italy: Società pavese di storia patria.
5. Colombo, Alessandro (1933). Cartario di Vigevano e del suo comitato. Italy: tip. nazionale di E. Natal.
6. Muratori, Lodovico Antonio (1912). Rerum italicarum scriptores, Volumen 14, Parte 1. Italy: Tipi dell'editore S. Lapi.
- de Ardicio
1. Società pavese di storia patria (1901). Bollettino della Società pavese di storia patria (Volumen 1, Fascículo 3) - Colombo, Alessandro. - "Bianca Visconti di Savoia e la sua Signoria di Vigevano (1381-1383). Italy: Società pavese di storia patria.
- de Ardizzi
1. Brambilla, Carlo Stefano (1669). La chiesa di Vigevano. Italy: Camagni.
- de Arditiij
1. Società storica lombarda (1894). Archivio storico lombardo. Italy: Società storica lombarda.
- de Arditiis
1. Andenna, Giancarlo (1992). Metamorfosi di un borgo: Vigevano in etā visconteo-sforzesca : [atti del Convegno di Studi "Vigevano in etā visconteo-sforzesca" (Vigevano 30 settembre-1 ottobre 1988)]. Italy: Franco Angeli.
2. Giorgio, Pietro; Bucella, Biffignandi (1810). Memorie istoriche della citta e contado di Vigevano. Opera postuma. Corredata di note e di documenti. - Vigevano 1810. Italy: Universita di Pavia.
3. Società storica lombarda (1894). Archivio storico lombardo. Italy: Società storica lombarda.
4. Società di storia, arte, e archeologia per le provincie di Alessandria e Asti (1907). Rivista di storia, arte, archeologia per le province di Alessandria e Asti. Italy: Società di storia, arte, e archeologia per le provincie di Alessandria e Asti.
- de arditijs
1. Societa Storica Lombarda (1904). Archivio Storico Lombardo (Serie 4, Volume 1, Fascicolo 1), Alessandro Colombo. Un dono de' vigevanesi a Francesco Sforza (marzo 1450) . Italy, Milano: Fratelli Boca.'
2. Società pavese di storia patria (1988). Bollettino della Società pavese di storia patria, Volumen 88. Italy: Società pavese di storia patria.
3. Colombo, Alessandro (1933). Cartario di Vigevano e del suo comitato. Italy: tip. nazionale di E. Natal.
- degli Ardizi
1. Pizzani, Ubaldo; Isola, Antonio; Menestò, Enrico; Di Pilla, Alessandra (2002). Curiositas: studi di cultura classica e medievale in onore di Ubaldo Pizzani. Italy: Edizioni scientifiche Italyne.
2. Comuni della provincia di Alessandria (1905). CComuni della provincia di Alessandria. Italy: Comuni della provincia di Alessandria.
- Del Pozo Arditij
1. Dal Pozzo, Simone (1550). Libro d'Estimo generale della città di Vigevano e suo territorio con cronache e notizie stor. ed elenco delle materie in esso contenute 1550. Italy.
2. Muggiati, Pier Luigi, Ramella, Carlo (2003). Historia de l'inclita citta de Vigevano. La storia di Vigevano nelle Cronache del cancelliere Simone del Pozzo. Italy: Arké Edizioni Società Storica Vigevanese.
- Del Pozzo Ardizzi
1. Giorgio, Pietro; Bucella, Biffignandi (1810). Memorie Istoriche della Città e Contado di Vigevano. Italy: dalla tipografia di Vigevano.
2. Dal Pozzo, Simone (1550). Libro d'Estimo generale della città di Vigevano e suo territorio con cronache e notizie stor. ed elenco delle materie in esso contenute 1550. Italy.
3. Muggiati, Pier Luigi; Ramella, Carlo (2003). Historia de l'inclita citta de Vigevano. La storia di Vigevano nelle Cronache del cancelliere Simone del Pozzo. Italy: Arké Edizioni Società Storica Vigevanese.
4. Italy. Esercito (1907). Annuario militare del regno d'Italy. Italy: E. Voghera.
5. Italy. Esercito (1884). Annuario militare del regno d'Italy. Italy.
6. Italy. (1876). Gazzetta ufficiale del regno d'Italy, Parte 1. Italy.
7. Corpo di stato maggiore. Ufficio storico. (1910). La guerra del 1859 per indipendenza d'Italy, Volumen 4. Italy: Società Editrice Lazial.
8. Rinaudo, Costanzo (1973). Rivista storica Italyna, Volumen 85. Italy: Edizioni scientifiche Italyne.
- delli Arditij
1. Dal Pozzo, Simone (1550). Libro d'Estimo generale della città di Vigevano e suo territorio con cronache e notizie stor. ed elenco delle materie in esso contenute 1550. Italy.
2. Muggiati, Pier Luigi, Ramella, Carlo (2003). Historia de l'inclita citta de Vigevano. La storia di Vigevano nelle Cronache del cancelliere Simone del Pozzo. Italy: Arké Edizioni Società Storica Vigevanese.
- Poza et Arditia
1. Dal Pozzo, Simone (1550). Libro d'Estimo generale della città di Vigevano e suo territorio con cronache e notizie stor. ed elenco delle materie in esso contenute 1550. Italy.
2. Muggiati, Pier Luigi, Ramella, Carlo (2003). Historia de l'inclita citta de Vigevano. La storia di Vigevano nelle Cronache del cancelliere Simone del Pozzo. Italy: Arké Edizioni Società Storica Vigevanese.
- Pozo-Ardicio
1. Società pavese di storia patria (1903). Bollettino della Società pavese di storia patria (Volume 3, Fascicolo 3-4) - Alessandro Colombo - "Vigevano e la Repubblica Ambrosiana nella lotta contro Francesco Sforza (Agosto 1447-Giugno 1449). Italy: Società pavese di storia patria.
- Pozzi Ardizzi
1. Giordano, Luisa; Tardito, Rosalba (2000). Piazza ducale e i suoi restauri: Cinquecento anni di storia. Italy: Edizione Ets.
2. Bergamo, Romano (1995). Storia dei comuni, frazioni e parrocchie della Lomellina. Volume 2. Italy: EMI.
- Pozzo Ardizzi
1. Società storica lombarda (1905). Serie Quarta. Archivio Storico Lombardo. Vol. III. (Alessandro Colombo. "L'ingresso di Francesco Sforza in Milano e l'inizio di un novo prinzipato") - (Felice Fossati. "La plebe vigevanese alla conquista dei potere pubblici nel 1536". Italy: Società storica lombarda.
2. Bellazzi, Don Pietro (1964). La chiesa di S. Francesco in Vigevano. Vigevano. Italy: Crespi.
3. Guillermo Kraft Limitada (1955). Quién es quién en la Argentina: biografías contemporáneas. Buenos Aires, Argentina: Guillermo Kraft Limitada.
4. Pellettieri Osvaldo, Burgos Nidia (2005). Historia del teatro argentino en las provincias, Volumen 1. Buenos Aires, Argentina: Galerna. Instituto Nacional del Teatro.
5. Saítta, Sylvia; y Romero, Luis Alberto (2002). Grandes entrevistas de la Historia Argentina (1879-1988). Buenos Aires, Argentina: Punto de Lectura.
6. Pintó, Juan (1941). Panorama de la literatura argentina contemporánea. Buenos Aires, Argentina: Mundi.
- Puteo Arditij
1. Dal Pozzo, Simone (1550). Libro d'Estimo generale della città di Vigevano e suo territorio con cronache e notizie stor. ed elenco delle materie in esso contenute 1550. Italy.
2. Muggiati, Pier Luigi, Ramella, Carlo (2003). Historia de l'inclita citta de Vigevano. La storia di Vigevano nelle Cronache del cancelliere Simone del Pozzo. Italy: Arké Edizioni Società Storica Vigevanese.
- Puteus Ardicii
1. Alessandria (Italy). Museo e pinacoteca civico, Carlenrica Spantigati, Giovanni Romano, Cassa di Risparmio di Alessandria (1986). Museo e la pinacoteca di Alessandria. Italy: Cassa di risparmio di Alessandria.
