= Madonna della Neve, Vigevano =

Coordinates: 45°19′13″N 8°51′36″E

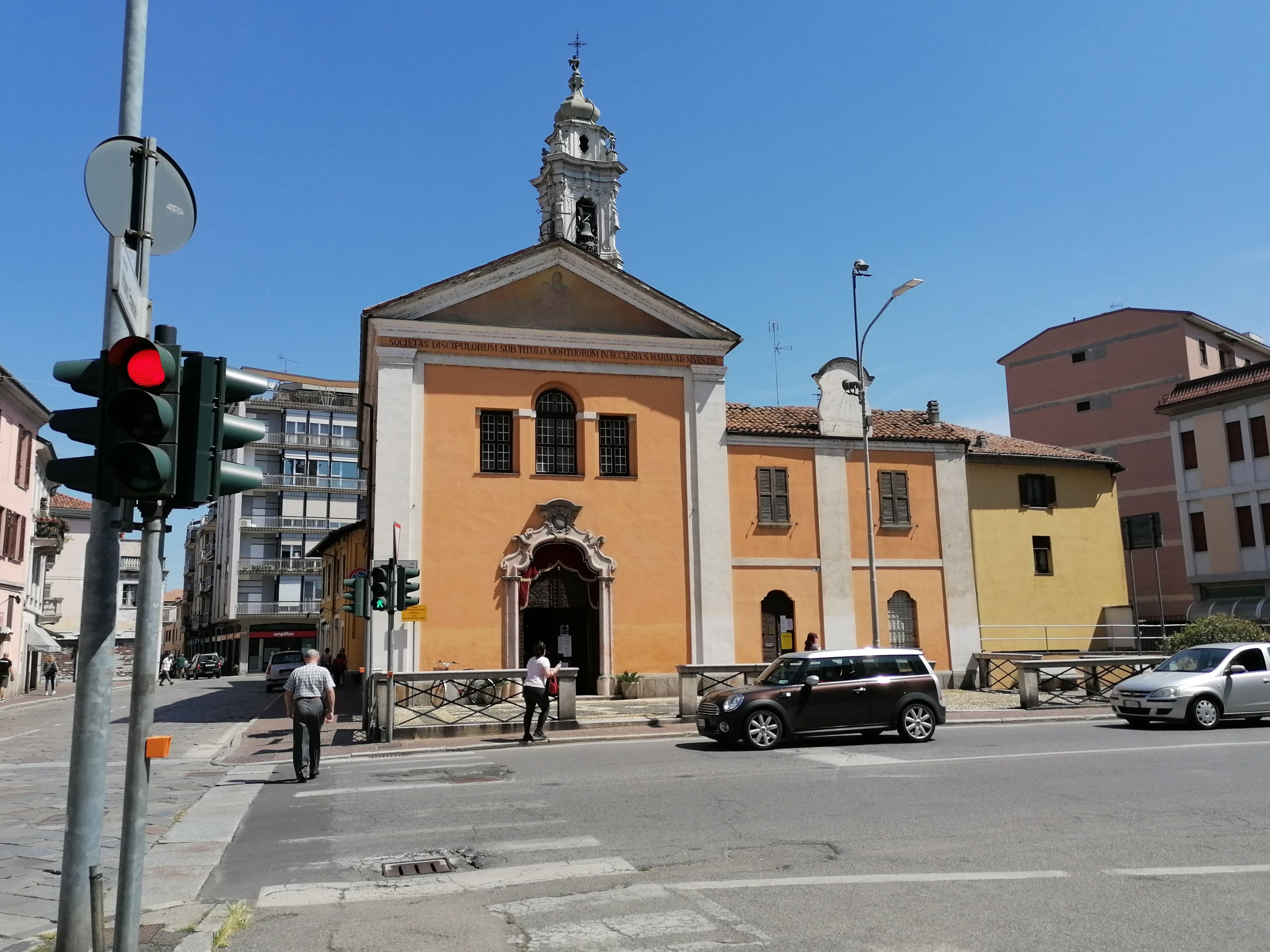
The church.

The church of Madonna della Neve or church of Santa Maria della Neve is a religious building located in Vigevano, in province of Pavia and diocese of Vigevano.

== Description and history ==
It was built on the site where there was the small church of Santa Maria dei Pesci which was then destroyed in 1600 and from which the ancient icon was taken and transported to the new church. In 1607 the brotherhood of Death settled there. It was then restored in 1728 and 1842, adding new paintings. There are four altars, dedicated respectively to Our Lady of Caravaggio, to St. Filippo Benizi, to St. Anthony and to the Saints Crispin and Crispinian.

Inside, in Baroque style, there is a fresco on the vault which houses architectural backgrounds of great scenographic effect. The main altar has the Virgin between Saints Roch and Sebastian in the center, of the Lombard school. The child plays with the cat, in the arms of the Madonna who wears a blue cloak with small flowers, closed with a clasp. She is sitting on a niche-shaped wooden throne. The black and white checkered floor. In the background a bright red band and above the blue sky against which the refined shapes of the faces stand out. To her right, Saint Roch, with his yellow and red doublet, and the pilgrim's cloak. On the left, the beautiful body pierced by the arrows of Saint Sebastian. The portal is enriched by a baroque frieze in red Verona marble with black inserts.

The bell tower on the side in baroque style contrasts with the linearity of the church.
