= Riccardo Marchesini =

Italian canoeist

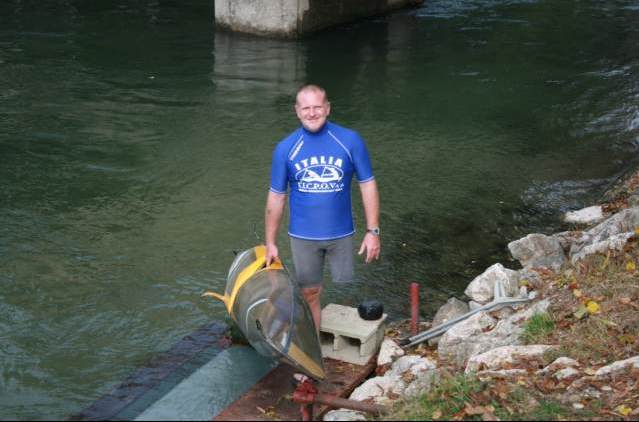

Personal information
- Full name: Riccardo Marchesini
- Nationality: Italian
- Born: 28 June 1952 Vigevano, Italy
- Height: 1.75 m (5 ft 9 in)
- Weight: 78 kg (172 lb)

Sport
- Sport: Canoe
- Event: K1

Riccardo Marchesini (Vigevano, Italy, 3 July 1963) is an Italian canoer and paracanoer, gold medalist at the 2010 World Cup.

== Biography ==
Aged 17, he lost a leg in a motorbike accident. After the surgery he put on weight up to 130 kg (290 lb). He then started canoeing as a sport and lost 60 kg (130 lb) in less than 9 months. He raced against non-handicapped sportsmen on the major rivers of Europe. He won 7 regional titles, he qualified 2nd several times at Italian championships, he got a bronze medal at 2008 Ivrea's World Championships.

As a paracanoer he won the gold medal at the world championship in 2010, two gold medals at the European championships in 2011 and 2012. He qualified 4th at the world championships in 2011 and 2012. He also won 9 national competitions, two of them in 2013.

He is a canoe trainer, also entitled to teach to handicapped people, a certified scuba diver and lifeguard.

In 2012 he was decorated with the CONI Gold medal for sport's merits, as he is the only amputee to participate in the marathon Pirano - Venice, a 100 km (62 mi) non-stop race lasting 9 hours and 45 minutes

He is a member of the Italian Paracanoe National Team.
