= San Pietro Martire, Vigevano =

Church in the province of Pavia, Italy

Coordinates: 45°18′54.18″N 8°51′21.42″E

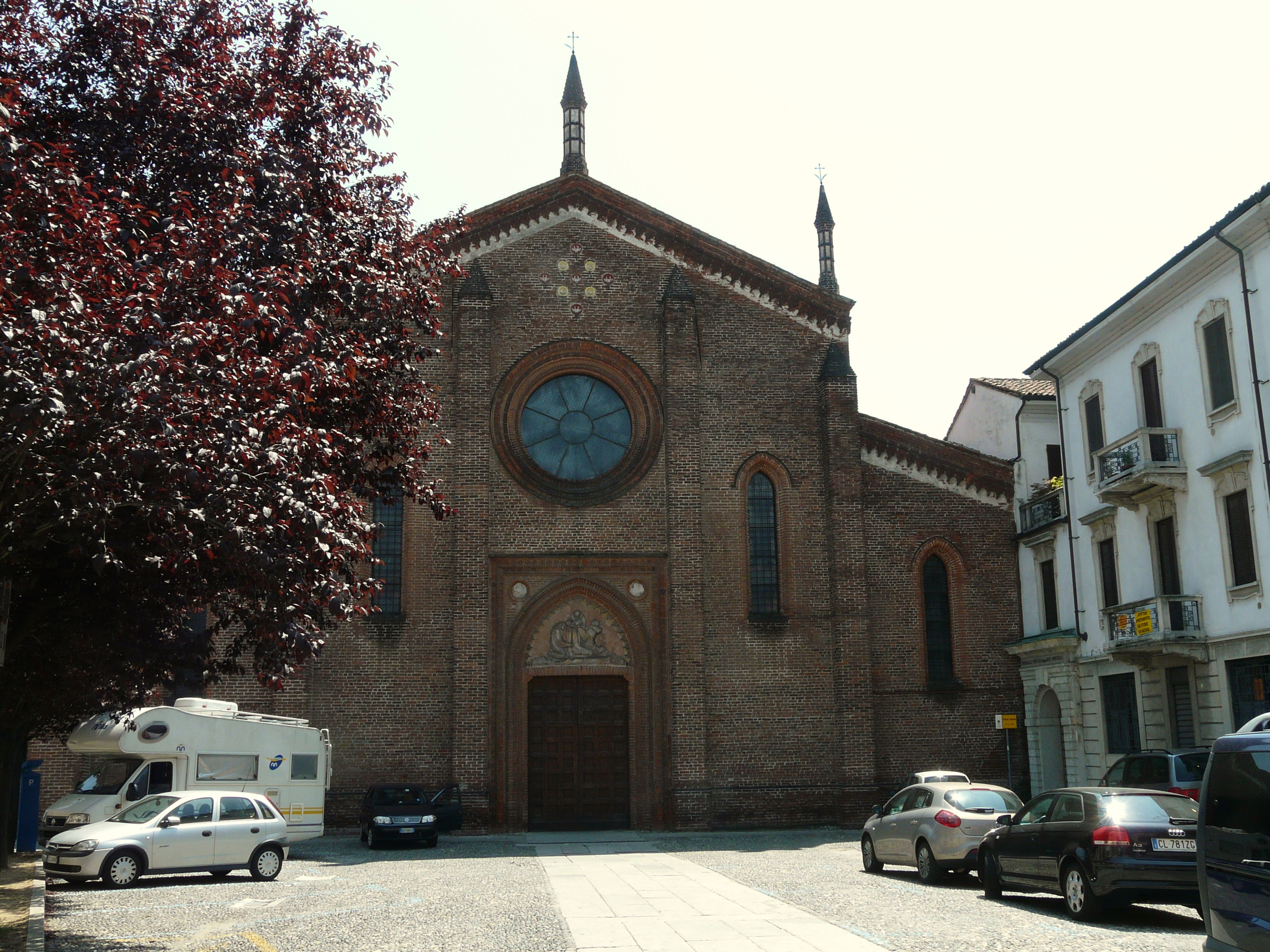
San Pietro Martire, Vigevano

San Pietro Martire or St Peter Martyr is a Gothic architecture, Roman Catholic church, linked at one time to an adjacent Dominican convent in Vigevano, Province of Pavia, region of Lombardy, Italy.

== History and description ==
The date of construction is unclear. It is supposed to have been built between 1218 and 1220, where there was a chapel dedicated to Saint Dominic, subsequently replaced by a much larger building, completed no earlier than 1363 and attributed to Bartolino da Novara. In 1446, the Dominican order took possession and under the patronage of Filippo Maria Visconti enlarged the church, converting the old nave into transept.<ref=alessandrocolombo>Il Rosario, Volume 22, Il Convento e la Chiesa dei Domenicani in Vigevano, by Professor Alessandro Colombo, Page 18.</ref>

The church is dedicated to Saint Peter Martyr with the adjoining convent of the friars Domenicans as attested by the pantifical bull preserved in the historical archives of Vigevano, it was consecrated in 1480. In pure Lombard Gothic style with bell tower with an octagonal base, it has a Latin cross imperfect with polystyle pillars, ending with a high polygonal choir with a crypt underneath whose access is given by two entrances on the sides of the raised presbytery. The nave has pilasters leading to gothic tracery. The interior has a number of decaying 16th-century frescoes. The chapels on the right are dedicated to St Cristopher (patron of one of the two parishes in Vigevano), St Anthony of Padua, St Vincent Ferrer, the Trinity, and the Crucifixion. On the left, they are dedicated to St Peter Martyr, St Joseph, St Dominic, St Pius V, and the Virgin of the Mercies. The altarpieces in the chapels are also by unknown artists. The body of the blessed Matteo Carreri, patron saint of Vigevano, who lived and died (1470) in the adjacent convent, is preserved in the crypt.

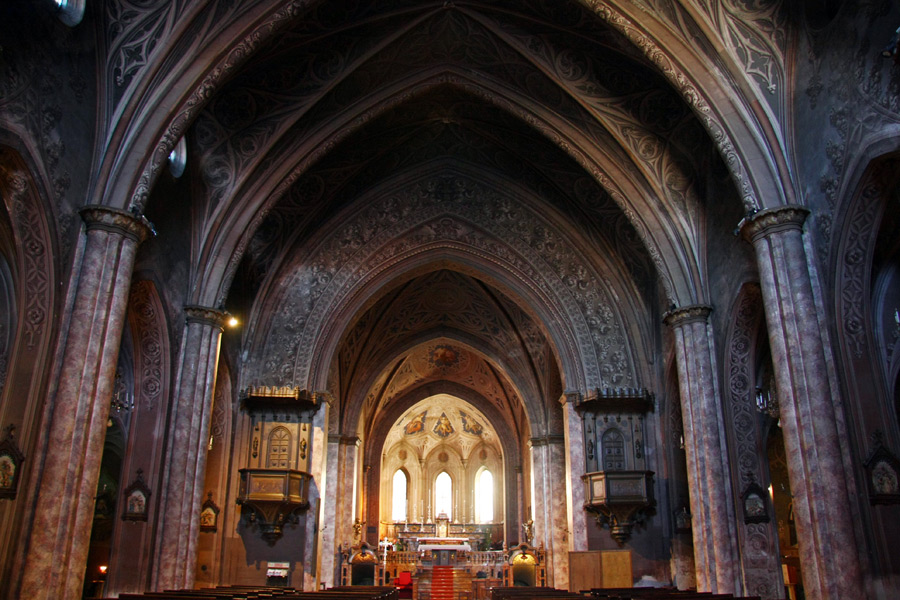
Interior of the church

In 1645, during the French siege of Rocca Nuova, the bell tower was demolished in half, vertically, to then be recomposed a few years later. The façade, divided into three parts corresponding to the naves and surmounted in the central part by three pinnacles, has a Gothic portal with rings enclosed by a terracotta frame with a bas-relief placed in 1969. On the left side a staircase leads to the secondary entrance at the head of the transept, while in correspondence with the nave there is the trace of a portal, now walled up, similar to the one on the facade which, according to local tradition, was reserved for the Sforza court. Until the end of the nineteenth century along the left side there was an embankment that connected the level of the square in front with the side entrance.

In 1840 a construction of the false vaults, in neo-Gothic style, led to the modification of the internal appearance. The vaults, built detached from the original exposed trussed roof, have effectively hidden the frescoes of 1447–50 located in the upper part of the transept arch. These frescoes, located in the space between the vaults and the roof, depict the bust of Saint Dominic of Guzmán in the centre, on the left a landscape with a castle and a church and on the right various soldiers with spears and flags including a cartouche with the writing "britanii"; the frescoes represent an ex-voto made by the people of Vigevano for the threat of raids by mercenaries in disarray after the dissolution of the Visconti duchy whose passage was prevented by the exceptional flood of the Ticino.
