= Vigevano =

Vigevano Avgevan (Lombard)
- Comune
- Città di Vigevano
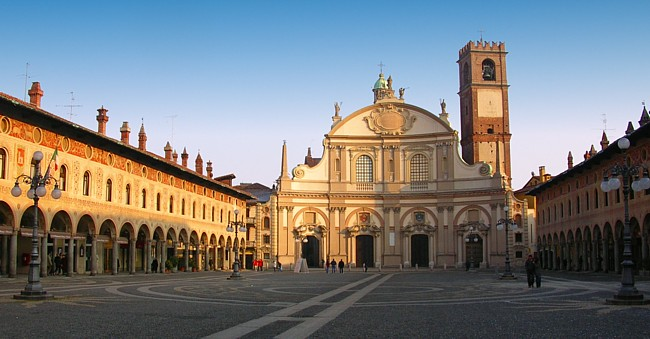
- Piazza Ducale, with the Cathedral façade

- Flag Coat of arms

- Vigevano within the province of Pavia

- Location within Italy Location within Lombardy
- Coordinates: 45°19′02″N 8°51′29″E
- Country: Italy
- Region: Lombardy
- Province: Pavia (PV)
- Frazioni: Piccolini, Morsella, Fogliano, Sforzesca, Buccella

Government
  - Mayor: Andrea Ceffa (LN)

Area
  - Total: 82 km^{2} (32 sq mi)
- Elevation: 116 m (381 ft)

Population (2025)
  - Total: 62,845
  - Density: 770/km^{2} (2,000/sq mi)
- Demonym: Vigevanesi
- Time zone: UTC+1 (CET)
  - Summer (DST): UTC+2 (CEST)
- Postal code: 27029
- Dialing code: 0381
- Website: Official website

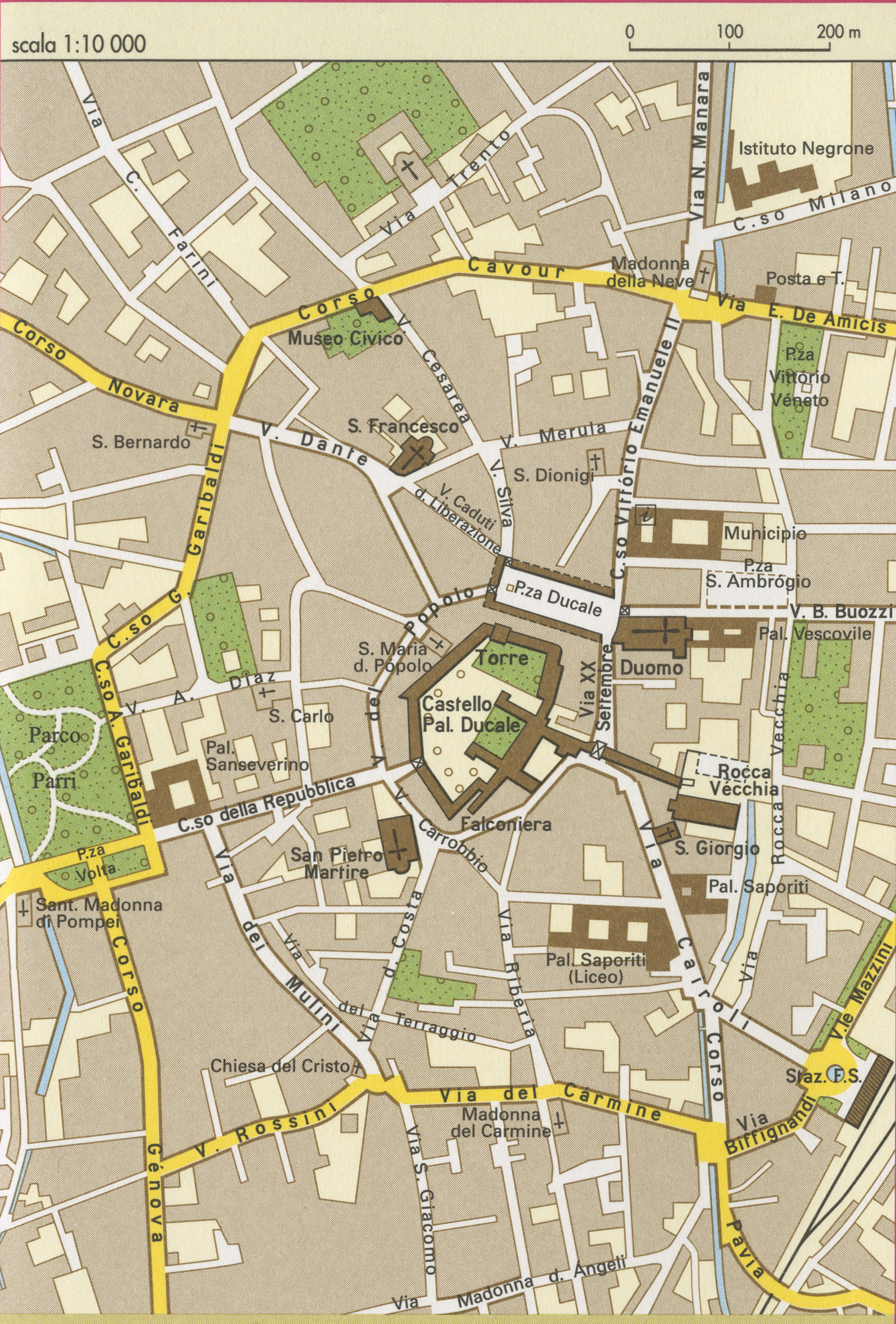
Map of city centre

Vigevano (Italian: [viˈdʒɛːvano, -ˈdʒeː-]; Western Lombard: Avgevan) is a comune (municipality) in the province of Pavia, in the Italian region of Lombardy. A historic art town, it is also renowned for shoemaking and is one of the main centres of Lomellina, a rice-growing agricultural district. Vigevano received the honorary title of city with a decree of Duke Francis II Sforza on 2 February 1532. It is famed for its Renaissance Piazza Ducale in the centre of the town. It is also known for the Rassegna Litteraria di Vigevano (Literary Review of Vigevano), an annual cultural event celebrating literature and the arts, which honours two distinguished personalities from the world of culture every year with the National Prize and the International Career Prize.

== History ==
The earliest records of Vigevano date back to 963, when for the first time is mentioned in documents the castle of Vigevano. Vigevano was given in 1154 by Emperor Frederick Barbarossa in Pavia.

Vigevano was accordingly besieged and taken by the Milanese in 1201 and again in 1275. In 1328 it finally surrendered to Azzone Visconti, and thereafter shared the political fortunes of Milan. The Church of San Pietro Martire (St Peter Martyr) was built, with the adjacent Dominican convent, by Filippo Maria Visconti in 1445. In the last years of Visconti domination it sustained a siege by Francesco Sforza. Once he was settled in power in Lombardy, Sforza arranged for Vigevano to be set up as the seat of a bishop and provided its revenues.

== Demographics ==
Historical population

Year	Pop.	±%
1861	17,328	—
1871	19,833	+14.5%
1881	20,416	+2.9%
1901	23,560	+15.4%
1911	27,746	+17.8%
1921	30,029	+8.2%
1931	32,978	+9.8%
1936	38,039	+15.3%

Year	Pop.	±%
1951	43,805	+15.2%
1961	57,069	+30.3%
1971	67,909	+19.0%
1981	65,179	−4.0%
1991	60,384	−7.4%
2001	57,450	−4.9%
2011	60,109	+4.6%
2021	62,201	+3.5%

Source: ISTAT

=== Ethnicities and foreign minorities ===
As of January 1, 2025, foreigners residing in Vigevano with a regular residence permit were 10,219 equal to approximately 16.3% of the population. The most represented nationalities were:

1. Egypt, 2,434
2. Romania, 1,190
3. Albania, 794
4. Morocco, 639
5. Perù, 629
6. China, 455
7. Philippines 421
8. Ukraine, 388
9. Tunisia, 353
10. Ecuador, 325

== Main sights ==
=== Castello Sforzesco ===
Vigevano is crowned by the Castello Sforzesco, a stronghold rebuilt 1492–94 for Ludovico Maria Sforza (Ludovico il Moro), the great patron born in the town, who transformed the fortification/hunting lodge of Luchino Visconti (who in turn had re-used a Lombard fortress) into a rich noble residence, at the cusp of Gothic and Renaissance. Leonardo da Vinci was his guest at Vigevano, as was Bramante, who is ascribed with the tall tower that watches over the piazza from the Castello Sforzesco. The old castle has a unique raised covered road, high enough for horsemen to ride through, that communicates between the new palace and the old fortifications; there is a Falconry, an elegant loggiato supported by 48 columns, and, in the rear area of the mastio, the Ladies' Loggia made for Duchess Beatrice d'Este.

=== Piazza Ducale ===
Vigevano's main attraction is the Piazza Ducale, an elongated rectangle that is almost in the proportions 1:3, built for Ludovico Sforza, starting in 1492-93 and completed in record time, unusual for early Renaissance town planning. Piazza Ducale was actually planned to form a noble forecourt to his castle, unified by the arcades that completely surround the square, an amenity of the new North Italian towns built in the 13th century. The town's main street enters through a sham arcaded façade that preserves the unity of the space as at the Place des Vosges. Ludovico demolished the former palazzo of the commune of Vigevano to create the space.

At the outside of town is the La Sforzesca, a rectangular villa-fortress with corner palace-towers, built in 1486 by Ludovico il Moro.

=== Cathedral ===
In the 17th century one end of the Piazza Ducale was enclosed by the concave Baroque façade of the Cathedral, cleverly adjusted to bring the ancient duomo into a line perpendicular to the axis of the piazza and centered on it.

The Cathedral was begun in 1532 under Duke Francesco II, who commissioned the design to Antonio da Lonate. The edifice was completed in 1606. The interior is on the Latin cross plan, with a nave and two aisles, and houses works by Macrino d'Alba, Bernardino Ferrari and others, as well as tempera polyptych of the school of Leonardo da Vinci.

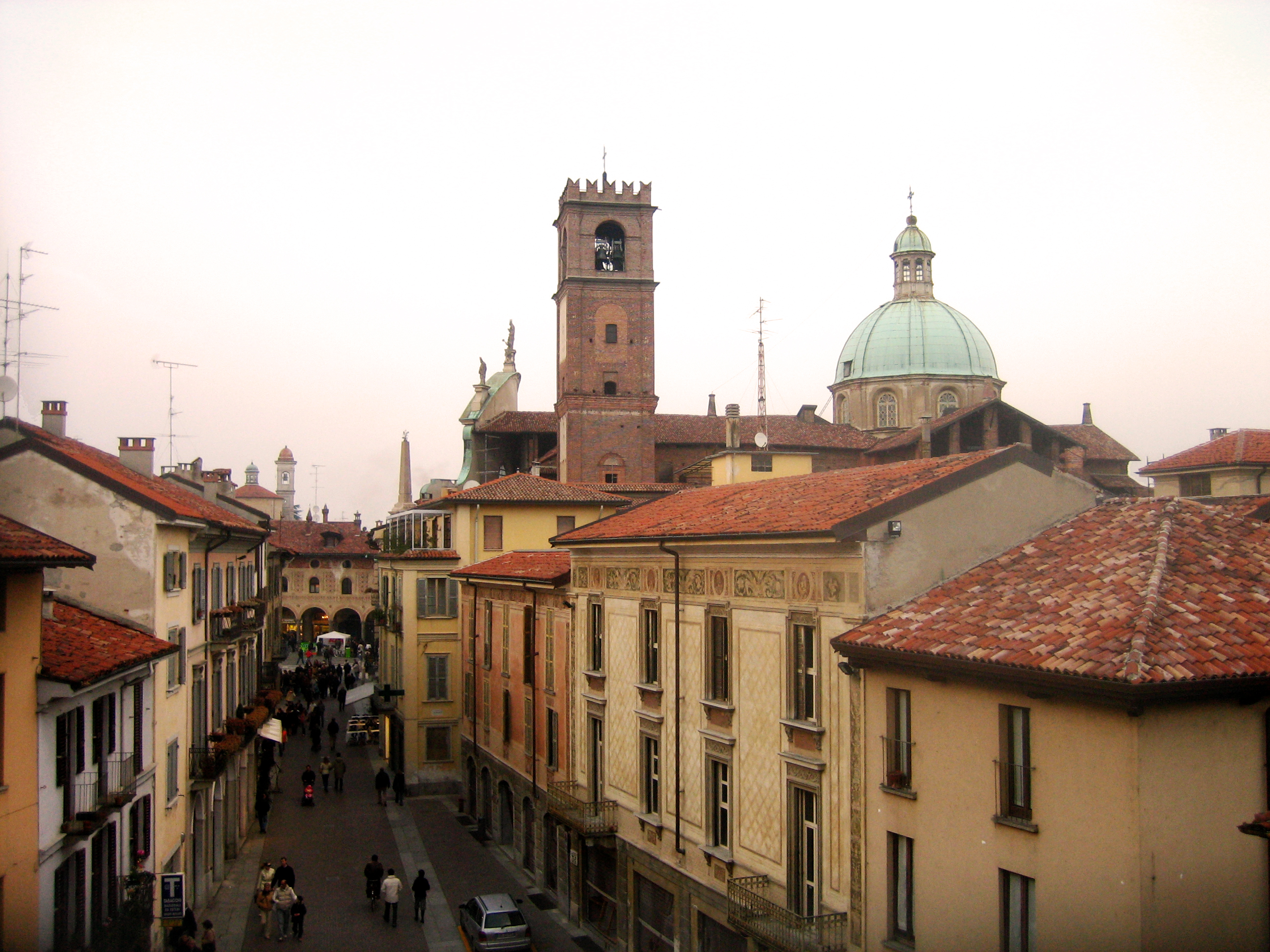
A street in central Vigevano

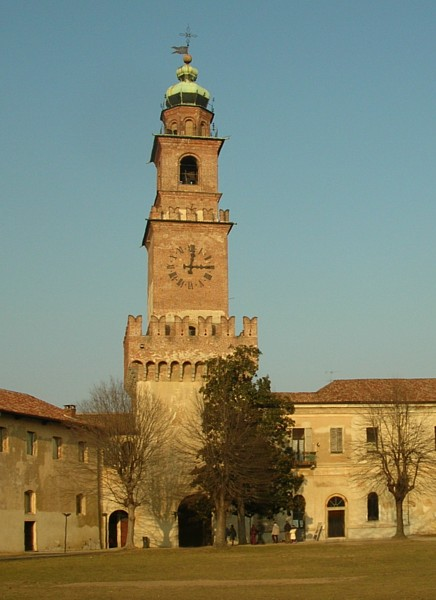
Bramante's Tower, Castello Sforzesco of Vigevano

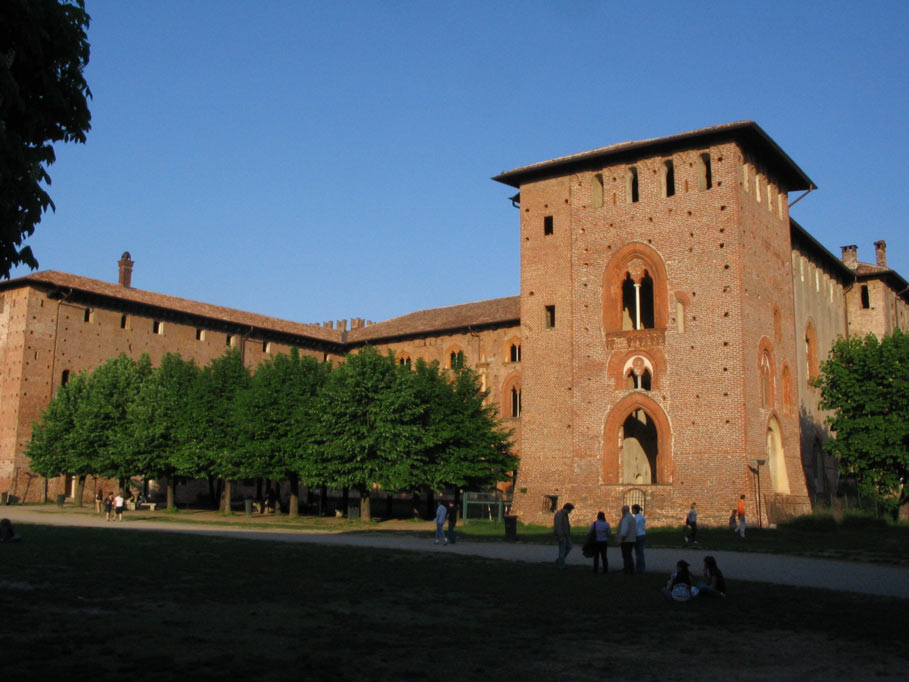
Court of the Castello Sforzesco

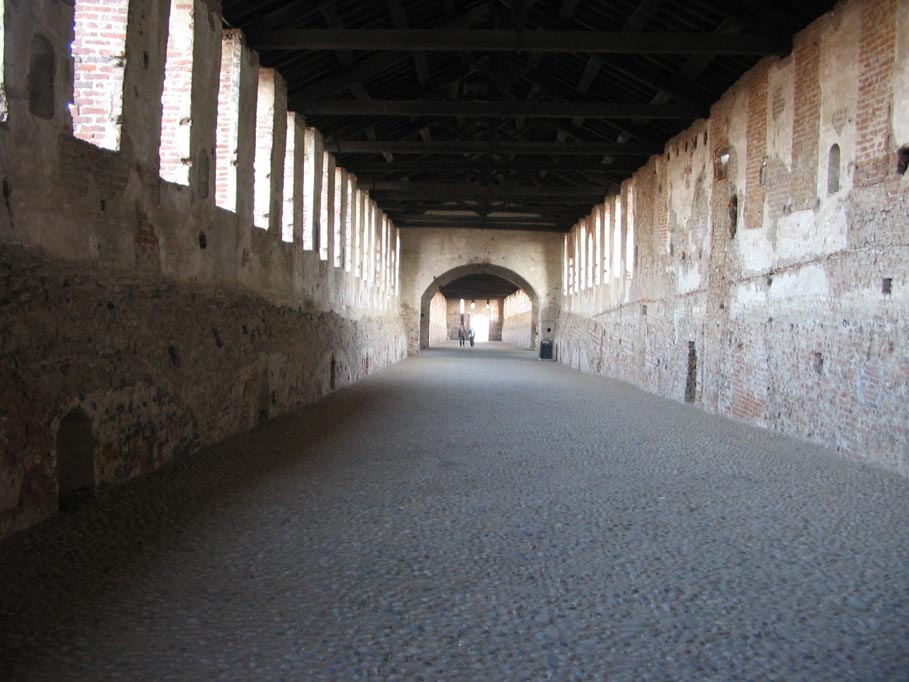
The famous road-gallery in the Castello Sforzesco

== Economy ==
For centuries, the city was a manufacturing centre, especially for the silk and cotton industry.

The key sector of Vigevano industry is shoemaking. Handily shoemaking began to expand during the First World War and, by the 1950s, Vigevano was known as Italy's "shoe capital".

== People ==
- Abramo Ardizzi (de Arditiis or Ardiciis) (15th century), diplomat, ambassador, bishop and cardinal
- Camilla Rodolfi (fl. 1449), military commander of group of women defending Vigevano
- Donato Bramante (1444–1514), architect and painter. He worked in Vigevano for Ludovico Sforza.
- Ludovico Sforza (1452–1508), Duke of Milan
- Leonardo da Vinci (1452–1519), polymath. He worked in Vigevano for Ludovico Sforza
- Bona Sforza (1494–1557), Queen of Poland and Grand Duchess of Lithuania
- Juan Caramuel y Lobkowitz (1606–1682), mathematician and bishop of Vigevano
- Giovanni Peroni, industrialist, who founded Peroni Brewery in Vigevano, in 1846
- Carlo Erba (1811–1888), founder of Carlo Erba Spa (merged with Farmitalia)
- Eleonora Duse (1858–1924), Italian actress, often known simply as Duse
- Alberto Bonacossa (1883–1953), tennis player
- Giulio Basletta (1890–1975), fencer
- Vito Pallavicini (1924–2007), lyricist, mostly known for being one of the two writers of "Azzurro"
- Guido Ferracin (1926–1973), athlete, European bantam weight boxing champion
- Gian Carlo Rota (1932–1999), mathematician and philosopher
- Riccardo Marchesini (born 1952), canoer
- Davide Olivares (born 1971), former professional footballer
- Andrea Soncin (born 1978), football coach and former player
- Gianluca Gazzoli (born 1988), radio personality, television presenter and YouTuber
- Margie Santimaria (born 1989), professional triathlete
- Tatiana Bonetti (born 1991), footballer
- Filippo Baldi (born 1996), former tennis player and tennis coach
- Sarah Toscano (born 2006), singer-songwriter and actress

== Twin towns ==
- Ficarra, Italy
- Matera, Italy
- Wenzhou, People's Republic of China

== Bibliography ==
- Giedion, Sigfried (1967). Space, Time and Architecture: The Growth of a New Tradition. Harvard University Press. ISBN 9780674830400.
